= List of Navy Cross recipients for World War II =

This is a list of Navy Cross recipients for actions of valor carried out during World War II, awarded by the United States Department of the Navy.

World War II was a global military conflict, the joining of what had initially been two separate conflicts. The first began in Asia in July 1937 as the Second Sino-Japanese War; the other began in Europe in September 1939 with the German and Soviet invasion of Poland. This global conflict split the majority of the world's nations into two opposing military alliances: the Allies and the Axis powers.

The United States was drawn into World War II on December 8, 1941, a day after the Axis-member Japan launched a surprise attack on Pearl Harbor in Honolulu.

While the U.S. Department of Defense website of Military Awards for Valor states that "Army Air Corps/Army Air Forces/U.S. Air Force members recognized for actions prior to 1 July 1948 are listed as Army members", the list here attempts to give the specific detail for members of the Army Air Forces, which existed during World War II.

As of July 2022, this list is incomplete, showing 1,485 Navy Crosses awarded in all service branches for actions of valor during World War II: 489 to U.S. Navy recipients; 1,029 U.S. Marine Corps recipients; 11 U.S. Army Air Forces recipients; 6 U.S. Coast Guard recipients; 3 U.S. Army recipients; and 1 civilian recipient. By partial comparison, as of June 2022, the U.S. Department of Defense shows 3,008 awarded to Navy recipients and 1,081 to Marines Corps recipients, for acts of valor during World War II.

The Navy Cross was also occasionally awarded to foreign personnel serving with allied forces - for example, Commander Gordon Bridson and Leading Signalman Campbell Buchanan, both of the Royal New Zealand Navy, whose actions helped sink Japanese submarine Japanese submarine I-1 in World War II.

Awarded posthumously

== A ==
| Name | Service | Rank | Place of action | Date of action | Notes |
|---|---|---|---|---|---|
| Gordon Abbott | Navy | Commander | off Okinawa, Ryukyu Islands | April 6, 1945 | |
| William E. Abbott † | Navy | Aviation Machinist's Mate Third Class | northwest Borneo | December 12, 1944 | |
| Brent M. Abel | Navy | Lieutenant Commander | off Cape Verde Islands | May 6, 1944 | |
| Rondo G. Abel | Marine Corps | Corporal | Iwo Jima, Volcano Islands | February 24, 1945 | |
| Mannert L. Abele † | Navy | Lieutenant Commander | off Alaska | June 30 – July 24, 1942 | |
| Laurence A. Abercrombie | Navy | Commander | Far East | December 24, 1941 | First award |
| Laurence A. Abercrombie | Navy | Commander | off the Gilbert Islands | October 22, 1942 | Second award |
| Laurence A. Abercrombie | Navy | Commander | South Pacific | February 17, 1943 | Third award |
| William W. Abercrombie † | Navy | Ensign | Midway | June 4, 1942 | |
| Louis M. Abernathy | Navy | Lieutenant, Junior Grade | Kure Harbor, Japan | July 24, 1945 | |
| Elmer P. Abernethy | Navy | Commander | off Christmas Island | March 1, 1942 | |
| Merlin F. Achor | Navy | Pharmacist's Mate Second Class | Iwo Jima, Volcano Islands | February 24, 1945 | |
| Lloyd E. Acree † | Navy | Aviation Ordnanceman Third Class | off Guadalcanal, Solomon Islands | October 11–12, 1942 | |
| Robert F. Adair | Navy | Lieutenant | off Samar, Philippine Islands | October 25, 1944 | |
| Frederick L. Adams | Marine Corps | Gunnery Sergeant | Cape Gloucester, New Britain | December 26–28, 1943 | |
| John P. Adams | Navy | Ensign | Coral Sea | May 4 & 8, 1942 | First award |
| John P. Adams | Navy | Ensign | Midway | June 4, 1942 | Second award |
| John P. Adams † | Marine Corps | Lieutenant Colonel | Cavite Naval Yard, Philippines | December 10, 1941 | POW |
| Marvin E. Adams | Navy | Ensign | Leyte Gulf, Philippines | October 24, 1944 | |
| Russell M. Adams | Navy | Lieutenant, Junior Grade | Philippine Sea | October 26, 1944 | |
| Samuel Adams | Navy | Lieutenant | New Guinea campaign | March 10, 1942 | First award, "Adams and his squadron inflicted severe damage on the enemy, with probable destruction of three hostile ships" |
| Samuel Adams | Navy | Lieutenant | Tulagi Harbor & Battle of the Coral Sea | May 4 & 7–8, 1942 | Second award, actions contributed to "the sinking or damaging of at least eight enemy Japanese vessels at Tulagi and the sinking of one carrier and the sinking or severe damaging of another in the Coral Sea" |
| Samuel Adams † | Navy | Lieutenant | Battle of Midway | June 4–6, 1942 | Third award, "established contact with [the Hiryū] ... and, in the face of fighter opposition ... sent complete contact and amplifying reports which later enabled our forces to attack the last remaining enemy aircraft carrier." |
| Thomas B. Adams | Navy | Lieutenant | Leyte Gulf, Philippines | October 25, 1944 | |
| William L. Adams | Navy | Lieutenant, Junior Grade | Philippine Sea | June 20, 1944 | |
| Clinton M. Adcock | Marine Corps | Private First Class | Iwo Jima, Volcano Islands | February 21, 1945 | Shielded two Marines from a hand grenade blast, and then killed two of the enemy despite losing his hand |
| James A. Adkins | Navy | Lieutenant Commander | off the Philippines | July 3 – August 25, 1944 | |
| Dwight M. Agnew | Navy | Commander | Guadalcanal, Solomon Islands | August 7 – October 25, 1942 | |
| Edward H. Ahrens † | Marine Corps | Private First Class | Tulagi, Solomon Islands | August 7–8, 1942 | |
| William L. Aiken | Marine Corps | Corporal | Cape Gloucester, New Britain | January 1, 1944 | |
| John W. Ailes III | Navy | Commander | off Okinawa, Ryukyu Islands | April 12, 1945 | |
| Walden L. Ainsworth | Navy | Rear Admiral | Kula Gulf, Solomon Islands | July 5–6, 1943 | |
| Alfred H. Akers Jr. † | Navy | Electrician's Mate Third Class | Mindanao Sea, Philippines | December 11, 1944 | |
| Daniel S. Albaugh † | Marine Corps | Private First Class | Iwo Jima, Volcano Islands | March 20, 1945 | |
| John C. Alderman | Navy | Commander | off Guadalcanal, Solomon Islands | August 8 – October 18, 1942 | |
| Charles W. Aldrich | Navy | Commander | off Okinawa, Ryukyu Islands | May 2 – June 24, 1945 | |
| Donald N. Aldrich | Marine Corps | Captain | Solomon Islands and Bismarck Archipelago areas | January 5 – February 15, 1944 | Shot down 15 Japanese aircraft during this period |
| James H. Alexander Jr. † | Navy | Lieutenant, Junior Grade | Bay of Biscay | September 4, 1943 | |
| Ralph C. Alexander | Navy | Captain | Leyte Gulf, Philippines | October 14–24, 1944 | |
| Samuel H. Alexander | Navy | Lieutenant | near Gela, Sicily | July 10, 1943 | |
| Bennett W. Alford | Marine Corps | First Lieutenant | Iwo Jima, Volcano Islands | March 12, 1945 | |
| Robert V. Allard † | Marine Corps | Sergeant | Makin Atoll, Gilbert Islands | August 17–18, 1942 | |
| Augustus T. Allen Jr. | Navy | Lieutenant, Junior Grade | Sicily | July 10–13, 1943 | |
| Edward H. Allen † | Navy | Lieutenant | Pacific Ocean | February 20, 1942 | First award |
| Edward H. Allen † | Navy | Lieutenant | Coral Sea | May 7, 1942 | Second award |
| James W. Allen | Navy | Hospital Apprentice First Class | Iwo Jima, Volcano Islands | February 22, 1945 | |
| Russell B. Allen | Navy | Commander | off Okinawa, Ryukyu Islands | April 14, 1945 | |
| Thomas J. Allen † | Marine Corps | Staff Sergeant | Okinawa, Ryukyu Islands | May 23, 1945 | |
| Walter H. Allen | Marine Corps | Sergeant | Iwo Jima, Volcano Islands | February 22, 1945 | |
| Richard G. Altmann | Navy | Ensign | Leyte Gulf, Philippines | October 25, 1944 | |
| John R. Alvord † | Marine Corps | Captain | Midway | June 4, 1942 | |
| John N. Ammen Jr. | Navy | Ensign | Coral Sea | May 7, 1942 | |
| Maurice R. Amundson † | Marine Corps | Captain | Guam, Marianas Islands | July 21–27, 1944 | |
| John R. Amussen | Navy | Lieutenant, Junior Grade | Philippine Sea | June 20, 1944 | |
| Martin L. Anderberg † | Marine Corps | Private First Class | Iwo Jima, Volcano Islands | February 21, 1945 | |
| Clarence N. Andersen † | Marine Corps | Corporal | Okinawa, Ryukyu Islands | May 9, 1945 | |
| Harvey M. Andersen | Navy | Lieutenant Commander | Java Sea | February 4, 1942 | |
| Alexander L. Anderson | Navy | Lieutenant | over Tokyo, Japan | February 16, 1945 | Personally shot down five enemy planes in a single action |
| Arthur Anderson † | Navy | Fireman First Class | Surigao Strait, Philippines | December 11, 1944 | |
| Arthur J. Anderson † | Marine Corps | Corporal | Guam, Marianas Islands | July 25–26, 1944 | |
| Edward L. Anderson | Navy | Lieutenant, Junior Grade | Midway | June 4–6, 1942 | |
| Elman A. Anderson † | Marine Corps | Sergeant | Saipan, Marianas Islands | July 2, 1944 | |
| Ralph G. Anderson † | Marine Corps | Sergeant | Guam, Marianas Islands | July 27, 1944 | |
| Ralph R. Anderson | Navy | Lieutenant | Kure Harbor, Japan | July 28, 1945 | |
| Robert H. Anderson | Navy | Lieutenant | off the Philippines | December 14, 1944 | |
| William H. Anderson Jr. | Navy | Lieutenant | Philippine Sea | October 24, 1944 | |
| William L. Anderson | Navy | Lieutenant Commander | South Pacific | December 30, 1941 – February 26, 1942 | |
| William W. Anderson | Navy | Lieutenant | Leyte Gulf, Philippines | October 25, 1944 | |
| Grant G. Andreasen | Navy | Lieutenant, Junior Grade | Normandy, France | June 6, 1944 | |
| Charles H. Andrews | Navy | Commander | Palau Islands | July 12–26, 1943 | First award |
| Charles H. Andrews | Navy | Commander | Celebes Sea | April 16 – June 11, 1944 | Second award |
| Thomas L. Andrews Jr. | Navy | Lieutenant | Leyte Gulf, Philippines | October 25, 1944 | |
| Clarence E. Angevine | Marine Corps | Private First Class | Cape Gloucester, New Britain | January 10, 1944 | |
| John W. Antonelli | Marine Corps | Major | Iwo Jima, Volcano Islands | February 19 – March 16, 1945 | |
| Richard N. Antrim | Navy | Commander | Java Sea | March 1, 1942 | Also awarded the Medal of Honor for actions as POW |
| Abel B. Aragon | Marine Corps | Private First Class | Guam, Marianas Islands | July 22, 1944 | |
| James D. Arbes | Navy | Lieutenant Commander | Philippine Sea | June 20, 1944 | |
| Raoul J. Archambault | Marine Corps | First Lieutenant | Iwo Jima, Volcano Islands | February 23, 1945 | |
| Robert J. Archer | Navy | Captain | off Okinawa, Ryukyu Islands | May 11, 1945 | |
| Max M. Archiberque | Navy | Signalman First Class | Solomon Islands | November 12–13, 1942 | |
| Charles F. Ard | Marine Corps | Corporal | Okinawa, Ryukyu Islands | June 14, 1945 | |
| Rae E. Arison | Navy | Commander | Solomon Islands | November 13, 1942 | |
| Kirk Armistead | Marine Corps | Major | Midway | June 4, 1942 | |
| Thomas E. Armour | Navy | Ensign | Leyte Gulf, Philippine Islands | October 25, 1944 | |
| John B. Armstrong † | Marine Corps | First Lieutenant | Saipan, Marianas Islands | June 15–16, 1944 | |
| Henry J. Armstrong | Navy | Commander | off Bougainville, Solomon Islands | November 1–2, 1943 | First award |
| Henry J. Armstrong | Navy | Commander | off Bougainville, Solomon Islands | November 24–25, 1943 | Second award |
| Robert G. Armstrong | Navy | Lieutenant Commander | near New Guinea | March 10, 1942 | |
| George J. Arnett † | Navy | Pharmacist's Mate Third Class | West Pacific | January 21, 1945 | |
| Herman F. Arnold † | Marine Corps | Private First Class | Guadalcanal, Solomon Islands | September 13–14, 1942 | |
| Jackson D. Arnold | Navy | Commander | Philippine Sea | June 20, 1944 | |
| John S. Arnold II | Navy | Ensign | off Georgia, U.S. | June 10, 1943 | |
| Ralph J. Arnold | Navy | Commander | Midway | June 4 & 6, 1942 | |
| Frederick L. Arsenault | Navy | Shipfitter Second Class | French Morocco | November 8–11, 1942 | |
| Norman Arsenault † | Marine Corps | Private | Saipan, Marianas Islands | July 8, 1944 | |
| Robert O. Arthur | Marine Corps | Staff Sergeant | Wake Island | December 8–23, 1941 | POW |
| Edward L. Asbill | Marine Corps | Major | Iwo Jima, Volcano Islands | February 21, 1945 | |
| Julian O. Aschenbach | Navy | Lieutenant, Junior Grade | near Dagua, New Guinea | May 13, 1944 | |
| James H. Ashley Jr. | Navy | Commander | off Formosa | September 23 – November 7, 1944 | First award |
| James H. Ashley Jr. | Navy | Commander | off Japan | June 25 – August 13, 1945 | Second award |
| John C. Atkeson | Navy | Lieutenant Commander | off Kamandorski Islands | March 26, 1943 | |
| Barry K. Atkins | Navy | Commander | Leyte Gulf, Philippines | October 24–25, 1944 | |
| Fitzgerald Atkinson Jr. | Marine Corps | First Lieutenant | Okinawa, Ryukyu Islands | June 17, 1945 | |
| Melvin K. Atwell | Navy | Lieutenant | Solomon Islands | October 27, 1942 | |
| Arthur J. Atwood † | Marine Corps | Private First Class | Guadalcanal, Solomon Islands | August 21, 1942 | |
| William B. Ault † | Navy | Commander | Coral Sea | May 7–8, 1942 | |
| Joseph M. Auman † | Marine Corps | Private | Guadalcanal, Solomon Islands | November 11, 1942 | |
| Evan P. Aurand | Navy | Lieutenant, Junior Grade | off New Guinea | March 10, 1942 | |
| Bernard L. Austin | Navy | Commander | Solomon Islands | November 1–2, 1943 | First award |
| Bernard L. Austin | Navy | Commander | off Bougainville, Solomon Islands | November 24–25, 1943 | Second award |
| John A. Austin † | Navy | Chief Carpenter | Pearl Harbor, Hawaii | December 7, 1941 | |
| Marshall H. Austin | Navy | Lieutenant Commander | Southwest Pacific | March 19 – May 2, 1944 | |
| Walton A. Austin | Navy | Ensign | Coral Sea | May 4–8, 1942 | |
| Howard M. Avery | Navy | Lieutenant Commander | South Atlantic | June 15, 1944 | |
| John E. Avery † | Navy | Ensign | Leyte Gulf, Philippines | October 25, 1944 | |
| George C. Axtell Jr. | Marine Corps | Major | off Okinawa, Ryukyu Islands | April 22, 1945 | Shot down five enemy planes and probably down three more in a single action |
| Russell G. Ayers | Army | Colonel | Eniwetok Atoll, Marshall Islands | February 19, 1944 | |
| Theodore C. Aylward | Navy | Lieutenant Commander | Molucca Strait | February 3, 1942 | |
| John B. Azer | Navy | Lieutenant Commander | Sea of Japan | October 9 – November 10, 1942 | First award |
| John B. Azer | Navy | Lieutenant Commander | near Truk Atoll | January 3 – February 2, 1943 | Second award |

== B ==
This along with the †, indicates that the Navy Cross was awarded posthumously

| Name | Service | Rank | Place of action | Date of action | Notes |
|---|---|---|---|---|---|
| John B. Babich † | Marine Corps | Private First Class | Iwo Jima, Volcano Islands | February 22, 1945 | |
| Webster J. Bachelot Jr. | Marine Corps | Corporal | Guam, Marianas Islands | July 27, 1944 | |
| Barton E. Bacon Jr. | Navy | Commander | Pacific Theater | December 8, 1941 – August 26, 1942 | |
| Donald G. Baer | Navy | Commander | South China Sea | September 4 – October 31, 1944 | |
| Barnie O. Baggett | Marine Corps | Corporal | Iwo Jima, Volcano Islands | February 28, 1945 | |
| Raymond W. Bahring † | Marine Corps | Corporal | Iwo Jima, Volcano Islands | February 21 – March 1, 1945 | |
| Bryan Bailey Jr. | Navy | Ensign | Kure Harbor, Japan | March 19, 1945 | |
| Wilfred M. Bailey | Navy | Lieutenant, Junior Grade | Leyte Gulf, Philippines | October 25, 1944 | |
| John B. Bain | Navy | Ensign | Coral Sea | May 7–8, 1942 | First award |
| John B. Bain | Navy | Ensign | Midway | June 4, 1942 | Second award |
| Dale W. Bair | Marine Corps | First Lieutenant | Okinawa, Ryukyu Islands | May 13, 1945 | During the Battle of Okinawa, during the assault on Sugar Loaf Hill Bair was part of an infantry assault supported by four tanks. Three of the four tanks were knocked out early on and many Marines were wounded. Despite his own wounds to the left arm, Bair picked up a Browning M1919 machine gun, draped it over his wounded left arm, and began charging towards the hill while firing the machine gun. Reaching the top of the hill, he sustained two more injuries, one to the leg and one to the buttocks, shortly before a retreat was ordered. When he made it back to the tank where the wounded Marines were being placed for the retreat, he refused to stop firing for medical attention and continued directing machine gun fire onto the enemy while receiving medical attention. |
| Robert Baird | Marine Corps | Captain | Okinawa, Ryukyu Islands | June 9, 16, & July 13, 1945 | Only Marine night fighter ace |
| Daniel W. Baker | Navy | Lieutenant, Junior Grade | Philippine Sea | October 24, 1944 | |
| Earl P. Baker Jr. | Navy | Lieutenant, Junior Grade | Inland Sea of Japan | July 24, 1945 | |
| John D. Baker † | Navy | Ensign | Coral Sea | May 7, 1942 | |
| Lewis R. Baker | Navy | Chief Electrician's Mate | Marshall Islands | December 4, 1943 | |
| Lionel H. Baker | Navy | Pharmacist's Mate Second Class | Pearl Harbor, Hawaii | December 7, 1941 | |
| Paul G. Baker † | Navy | Lieutenant, Junior Grade | Coral Sea | May 7–8, 1942 | |
| Wilder D. Baker | Navy | Rear Admiral | Sea of Okhotak, Japan | June 1943 – March 1944 | |
| Frederick E. Bakutis | Navy | Commander | Leyte Gulf, Philippines | October 24, 1944 | |
| Lawrence Baldinus | Marine Corps | Second Lieutenant | Guadalcanal, Solomon Islands | August 25 & 28, 1942 | |
| Paul Balducci † | Marine Corps | Platoon Sergeant | Iwo Jima, Volcano Islands | February 21, 1945 | |
| Remi A. Balduck † | Marine Corps | Corporal | Guadalcanal, Solomon Islands | November 9, 1942 | |
| Joe F. Ball | Navy | Lieutenant | Ormoc Bay, Leyte | December 3, 1944 | |
| Louis L. Bangs | Navy | Lieutenant Commander | Philippine Sea | June 20, 1944 | |
| Joseph Bangust † | Navy | Aviation Machinist's Mate First Class | Jolo Harbor, Philippines | December 27, 1941 | |
| Alan B. Banister | Navy | Commander | Pacific Theater | June 22 – August 15, 1944 | First award |
| Alan B. Banister | Navy | Commander | Pacific Theater | September 9 – November 8, 1944 | Second award |
| Donald F. Banker † | Navy | Lieutenant | Leyte Gulf, Philippines | October 25, 1944 | First award |
| Donald F. Banker † | Navy | Lieutenant | Manila Harbor, Philippines | November 5, 1944 | Second award |
| Rex L. Bantz | Navy | Lieutenant, Junior Grade | Leyte Gulf, Philippines | October 25, 1944 | |
| Donald B. Barber | Navy | Lieutenant, Junior Grade | near Kyushu, Japan | April 7, 1945 | |
| Rex T. Barber | Army Air Forces | First Lieutenant | Solomon Islands | April 18, 1943 | |
| Daniel E. Barbey | Navy | Rear Admiral | Lae & Finschafen, New Guinea | September 4 & 22, 1943 | |
| Loran E. Barbour | Navy | Aviation Chief Ordnanceman | Normandy, France | June 6, 1944 | |
| Burton L. Bardeen | Navy | Lieutenant | Kyushu, Japan | May 13–14, 1945 | |
| Joyce M. Bardelmeier | Navy | Lieutenant, Junior Grade | Kure Harbor, Japan | June 24, 1945 | |
| Kenneth P. Barden | Navy | Lieutenant, Junior Grade | Leyte Gulf, Philippines | October 25, 1944 | |
| Charlie H. Barfield | Navy | Ensign | Kure Harbor, Japan | July 24, 1945 | |
| Harry B. Barker † | Marine Corps | Captain | Guam, Marianas Islands | July 21, 1944 | |
| James D. Barker † | Navy | Pharmacist's Mate Second Class | Tarawa Atoll, Gilbert Islands | November 20, 1943 | |
| Robert A. Barker † | Marine Corps | Private First Class | Guam, Marianas Islands | July 25, 1944 | |
| Lloyd G. Barnard | Navy | Lieutenant | Bonin Islands | June 15, 1944 | Personally shot down five enemy planes in a single action |
| Doyle C. Barnes † | Navy | Ensign | Midway | June 4, 1942 | |
| James M. Barnes † | Navy | Ensign | Okinawa, Ryukyu Islands | April 6, 1945 | |
| Robert J. Barnes | Navy | Ensign | Leyte Gulf, Philippines | October 24, 1944 | |
| Robert M. Barnes | Navy | Lieutenant | Marcus Island | May 9, 1945 | |
| Stanley M. Barnes | Navy | Lieutenant Commander | Tunisia & Sicily | August 1–20, 1943 | |
| William Barnes | Marine Corps | Private First Class | Guadalcanal, Solomon Islands | September 13–14, 1942 | |
| William W. Barnes Jr. | Navy | Lieutenant, Junior Grade | Midway | June 4, 1942 | |
| Marshall D. Barnett Jr. † | Navy | Lieutenant, Junior Grade | Leyte Gulf, Philippines | October 24, 1944 | |
| Bernard Barney † | Navy | Seaman Second Class | Treasury Islands | October 27, 1943 | |
| James W. Barnitz | Navy | Lieutenant | Leyte Gulf, Philippines | October 24, 1944 | First award |
| James W. Barnitz | Navy | Lieutenant | Manila Bay, Philippines | November 5, 1944 | Second award |
| Jack P. Barnum | Navy | Lieutenant, Junior Grade | Solomon Islands | August 24, 1942 | |
| Richard S. Baron † | Navy | Lieutenant Commander | Philippines | December 10, 1941 | POW |
| Eric L. Barr Jr. | Navy | Commander | Pacific Theater | April 1 – June 1, 1944 | First award |
| Eric L. Barr Jr. | Navy | Commander | Sulu Sea & Manila Harbor, Philippines | September 18 – November 25, 1944 | Second award |
| Joseph J. Barr | Marine Corps | Second Lieutenant | Tarawa Atoll, Gilbert Islands | November 20, 1943 | |
| Lester J. Barre | Navy | Quartermaster Second Class | Java Sea | February 4, 1942 | |
| Francis B. Barrigar | Marine Corps | Private First Class | Eniwetok Atoll, Marshall Islands | February 18–22, 1944 | |
| Thomas E. Barrow | Marine Corps | Platoon Sergeant | Iwo Jima, Volcano Islands | February 26 – March 8, 1945 | |
| Albert A. Bartholomew | Navy | Carpenter | near Rennell Island, Solomon Islands | January 29–30, 1943 | |
| Arthur F. D. Bartholomew | Marine Corps | First Sergeant | Guadalcanal, Solomon Islands | October 25, 1942 | |
| Edward C. Bartles | Navy | Ensign | Kure Harbor, Japan | July 24, 1945 | |
| John W. Bartlett | Marine Corps | Sergeant | Peleliu, Palau Islands | September 19, 1944 | |
| Joseph L. Baruzzini | Navy | Lieutenant, Junior Grade | Kure Harbor, Japan | July 28, 1945 | |
| Tom B. Bash | Navy | Ensign | Coral Sea | May 8, 1942 | |
| John Basilone † | Marine Corps | Gunnery Sergeant | Iwo Jima, Volcano Islands | February 19, 1945 | Previously awarded the Medal of Honor for actions on Guadalcanal |
| Thomas M. Baskett | Navy | Lieutenant Commander | Pacific Theater | April 17 – May 21, 1944 | First award |
| Thomas M. Baskett | Navy | Commander | near Nanpo Shoto | May 12 – June 17, 1945 | Second award |
| Harry H. Basore | Navy | Lieutenant | Southern France | August 1944 | |
| Harry B. Bass | Navy | Lieutenant, Junior Grade | near Lae & Salamaua, New Guinea | March 10, 1942 | First award |
| Harry B. Bass | Navy | Lieutenant, Junior Grade | Coral Sea | May 7, 1942 | Second award |
| Horace A. Bass Jr. † | Navy | Ensign | Midway | June 4, 1942 | |
| Raymond H. Bass | Navy | Lieutenant Commander | Pacific Theater | April – May 1943 | First award |
| Raymond H. Bass | Navy | Lieutenant Commander | Pacific Theater | January 14 – March 8, 1944 | Second award |
| Robert W. Bass | Navy | Gunner's Mate Second Class | Normandy, France | June 6, 1944 | |
| Stewart Bass | Navy | Lieutenant, Junior Grade | near Kyushu, Japan | April 7, 1945 | |
| Edgar R. Bassett † | Navy | Ensign | Coral Sea | May 4–8, 1942 | |
| Joseph G. Basso | Marine Corps | Private First Class | Guam, Marianas Islands | July 24, 1944 | |
| Merton J. Batchelder | Marine Corps | Colonel | Tinian, Marianas Islands | July 24 – August 2, 1944 | |
| Frederic L. Bates | Navy | Lieutenant | Midway | June 6, 1942 | |
| Richard S. Bates | Navy | Lieutenant, Junior Grade | Leyte Gulf, Philippines | October 24, 1944 | |
| Richard W. Bates | Navy | Captain | Leyte Gulf, Philippines | October 25, 1944 | |
| William C. Bates | Navy | Lieutenant, Junior Grade | Leyte Gulf, Philippines | October 25, 1944 | |
| Charles J. Battali | Marine Corps | Private First Class | Eniwetok Atoll, Marshall Islands | February 18–22, 1944 | |
| Hugh N. Batten | Navy | Lieutenant, Junior Grade | Okinawa, Ryukyu Islands | April 6, 1945 | |
| Rollin M. Batten Jr. | Navy | Lieutenant, Junior Grade | Guam, Marianas Islands | July 4, 1944 | |
| Louis H. Bauer | Navy | Lieutenant | Solomon Islands | August 1942 | |
| William R. Bauhof | Navy | Lieutenant, Junior Grade | Marianas Islands | June 19, 1944 | |
| Robert J. Bausinger | Navy | Ensign | Kure Harbor, Japan | July 28, 1945 | |
| Eugene E. Baxter † | Navy | Pharmacist's Mate First Class | Guadalcanal, Solomon Islands | August 7 – November 3, 1942 | |
| Fremont H. Baxter | Navy | Lieutenant, Junior Grade | Leyte Gulf, Philippines | October 25, 1944 | |
| James L. Baxter | Navy | Ensign | Leyte Gulf, Philippines | October 25, 1944 | |
| Loren E. Baxter | Navy | Lieutenant, Junior Grade | Kure Harbor, Japan | July 24, 1945 | |
| Edward H. Bayers | Navy | Lieutenant | Midway | June 4–6, 1942 | |
| Frank S. Bayley Jr. | Navy | Lieutenant Commander | Okinawa, Ryukyu Islands | April – June 1945 | |
| Edward L. Beach Jr. | Navy | Lieutenant Commander | Waters of Jeju Island | April 14, 1945 | Executive Officer on USS Tirante (SS-420)'s first war patrol, torpedoed and sank Japanese transport, then did same to both pursuing military escort ships. For this action, Commanding Officer George L. Street III was awarded the Medal of Honor, and the entire Tirante crew received a Presidential Unit Citation. |
| Wallace M. Beakley | Navy | Lieutenant Commander | | | |
| Roy N. Bean | Navy | Lieutenant, Junior Grade | | | |
| Fred D. Beans | Marine Corps | Lieutenant Colonel | Bougainville, Solomon Islands | November 9, 1943 | |
| Robert J. Bear | Marine Corps | First Lieutenant | | | |
| Henry C. Bearden | Navy | Ensign | | | |
| Carlos M. Beardmore | Navy | Ensign | | | |
| Frank E. Beatty | Navy | Captain | | | |
| James R. Beck | Marine Corps | Private | | | |
| John W. Beck | Navy | Lieutenant, Junior Grade | | | |
| Albert L. Becker | Navy | Lieutenant Commander | | | |
| Claude Becker | Navy | Seaman Second Class | | | |
| Frederick J. Becton | Navy | Commander | | | |
| Marshall U. Beebe | Navy | Lieutenant Commander | | | |
| Donald R. Beeson | Navy | Lieutenant | | | |
| Fay B. Begor | Navy | Lieutenant, Junior Grade | | | |
| Charles E. Behan | Marine Corps | First Lieutenant | | | |
| Joseph Behl | Navy | Ensign | | | |
| William A. Behr | Navy | Ensign | | | |
| Carl W. Behrend | Navy | Machinist | | | |
| William W. Behrens | Navy | Captain | | | |
| Benjamin A. Bell | Marine Corps | Second Lieutenant | | | |
| David B. Bell | Navy | Lieutenant Commander | | | First award |
| David B. Bell | Navy | Commander | | | Second award |
| Forest W. Bell | Navy | Lieutenant, Junior Grade | | | |
| Frederick J. Bell | Navy | Commander | | | |
| James H. Bell | Navy | Lieutenant | | | |
| John J. Bell | Navy | Ensign | | | |
| Josiah S. Bell | Marine Corps | Private First Class | | | |
| Joseph S. Bellat | Marine Corps | Platoon Sergeant | | | |
| John F. Bence | Navy | Quartermaster First Class | | | |
| Harold E. Benedict | Marine Corps | Private First Class | | | |
| Charlie R. Benner | Marine Corps | Private First Class | | | |
| Carter L. Bennett | Navy | Lieutenant Commander | | | First award |
| Carter L. Bennett | Navy | Commander | | | Second award |
| John E. Bennett | Navy | Lieutenant, Junior Grade | | | |
| Thomas M. Bennett | Navy | Commander | | | |
| Thomas M. Bennett | Navy | Lieutenant, Junior Grade | | | |
| Walter T. Bennett | Navy | Coxswain | | | |
| Robert H. Benson | Navy | Lieutenant, Junior Grade | | | First award |
| Robert H. Benson | Navy | Lieutenant, Junior Grade | | | Second award |
| Roy S. Benson | Navy | Lieutenant Commander | | | First award |
| Roy S. Benson | Navy | Lieutenant Commander | | | Second award |
| Thomas W. Benson | Marine Corps | Second Lieutenant | | | |
| George F. Beranek | Marine Corps | Platoon Sergeant | | | |
| Joseph V. Berault | Marine Corps | Private First Class | | | |
| Adam W. Berg | Navy | Lieutenant, Junior Grade | | | |
| Nels L. Berger | Navy | Lieutenant, Junior Grade | | | |
| Charles K. Bergin | Navy | Commander | | | |
| Russell S. Berkey | Navy | Rear Admiral | Leyte Gulf, Philippines | October 24–25, 1944 | |
| Jack S. Berkheimer | Navy | Ensign | | | |
| John M. Bermingham | Navy | Lieutenant Commander | | | |
| James E. Berray | Marine Corps | Private First Class | | | |
| Bernard F. Berry | Navy | Lieutenant | | | |
| David R. Berry | Navy | Ensign | | | First award |
| David R. Berry | Navy | Ensign | | | Second award |
| David R. Berry | Navy | Ensign | | | Third award |
| Charles M. Bertholf | Navy | Commander | | | |
| John R. Bertie | Navy | Ensign | | | |
| Lorne J. Besse | Navy | Lieutenant | | | |
| Richard H. Best | Navy | Lieutenant Commander | | | |
| Aaron F. Beyer Jr. | Navy | Lieutenant Commander | | | |
| LaVell M. Bigelow | Navy | Ensign | | | First award |
| LaVell M. Bigelow | Navy | Ensign | | | Second award |
| LaVell M. Bigelow | Navy | Ensign | | | Third award |
| Albert W. Bilbrey | Marine Corps | Private First Class | | | |
| Thomas H. Binford | Navy | Commander | | | |
| Edward G. Binning | Navy | Lieutenant | | | |
| Robert F. Birch | Navy | Lieutenant | | | First award |
| Robert F. Birch | Navy | Lieutenant | | | Second award |
| Alexander J. Bisheimer | Navy | Seaman First Class | | | |
| Claude U. Bishop | Navy | Lieutenant Commander | | | |
| Stanley L. Bitchell | Marine Corps | Corporal | | | |
| Soule T. Bitting | Navy | Lieutenant | | | |
| Norman B. Bitzegaio | Navy | Ensign | | | |
| Vernard E. Bivin | Navy | Seaman First Class | | | |
| Paul H. Bjarnason | Navy | Commander | | | |
| Clarence H. Black | Navy | Lieutenant | | | |
| Joseph C. Black | Navy | Lieutenant | | | First award |
| Joseph C. Black | Navy | Lieutenant | | | Second award |
| William E. Black | Marine Corps | Private | | | |
| John T. Blackburn | Navy | Lieutenant Commander | | | |
| Robert J. Blaha | Marine Corps | Private First Class | | | |
| Richard L. Blain | Marine Corps | Captain | | | |
| Leon N. Blair | Navy | Captain | | | |
| Frank W. Blake | Navy | Ensign | | | |
| Edward N. Blakely | Navy | Commander | | | |
| Jay C. Blakely | Marine Corps | Private | | | |
| James W. Blanchard | Navy | Commander | | | |
| Frederick Blaser | Navy | Ensign | | | |
| Calvin J. Bleau | Marine Corps | Private | | | |
| Albert M. Bledsoe | Navy | Captain | | | |
| Otto R. Bleech | Navy | Lieutenant, Junior Grade | | | |
| Robert E. Blick Jr. | Navy | Captain | | | |
| Howard J. Blind | Navy | Lieutenant | | | |
| Welford C. Blinn | Navy | Lieutenant Commander | | | First award |
| Welford C. Blinn | Navy | Lieutenant Commander | | | Second award |
| Welford C. Blinn | Navy | Lieutenant Commander | | | Third award |
| John D. Blitch Jr. | Navy | Lieutenant Commander | | | |
| Victor E. Bloom | Navy | Motor Machinist's Mate First Class | | | |
| Walter J. Bodt | Marine Corps | Corporal | | | |
| Harold C. Boehm | Marine Corps | Lieutenant Colonel | Iwo Jima, Volcano Islands | February 25 – March 11, 1945 | |
| Donald A. J. Boese | Navy | Ensign | Tokyo Bay, Japan | February 17, 1945 | |
| Gerald F. Bogan | Navy | Rear Admiral | Luzon, Philippines | November 25, 1944 | |
| James D. Bogan | Navy | Lieutenant, Junior Grade | Leyte Gulf, Philippines | October 25, 1944 | |
| Joseph E. Bogdan † | Marine Corps | Private First Class | Okinawa, Ryukyu islands | May 17, 1945 | |
| John A. Bole Jr. | Navy | Lieutenant Commander | | | |
| Roger S. Boles | Navy | Lieutenant | | | |
| Joseph F. Bolger | Navy | Captain | | | First award |
| Joseph F. Bolger | Navy | Captain | | | Second award |
| Gordon E. Bolser | Navy | Lieutenant | | | |
| George K. Bomberger | Navy | Lieutenant | | | |
| Henry V. Bonzagni Jr. | Navy | Lieutenant | | | |
| Louis H. Boone Jr. | Marine Corps | Corporal | | | |
| Charles T. Booth II | Navy | Lieutenant Commander | | | |
| Peter Borecki | Marine Corps | Corporal | | | |
| Howard G. Boren Jr. | Navy | Lieutenant, Junior Grade | | | |
| Anthony E. Borgia | Marine Corps | Private First Class | | | |
| Clarence A. Borley | Navy | Ensign | | | |
| Frank P. Boro | Navy | Lieutenant, Junior Grade | | | |
| Kilmer S. Bortz | Navy | Lieutenant | | | First award |
| Kilmer S. Bortz | Navy | Lieutenant | | | Second award |
| Frank K. Bosworth Jr. | Marine Corps | Second Lieutenant | | | |
| Adolph M. Bothne | Navy | Boatswain | | | |
| George E. Bottjer | Navy | Ensign | | | |
| Harold S. Bottomley Jr. | Navy | Lieutenant | | | |
| Douglas Botts | Navy | Shipfitter First Class | | | |
| Joe W. Boulware | Navy | Commander | | | |
| Thomas E. Bourdon | Navy | Lieutenant, Junior Grade | | | |
| William A. Bourgeois | Navy | Lieutenant, Junior Grade | | | |
| George H. Bowen | Navy | Lieutenant, Junior Grade | | | |
| John R. Bowen II | Navy | Lieutenant | | | |
| Paul L. Bowen | Navy | Chief Boatswain | | | |
| John M. Bowers | Navy | Lieutenant Commander | | | |
| Thomas K. Bowers | Navy | Lieutenant | | | |
| Clarence M. Bowley | Navy | Captain | | | |
| Ralph R. Bowling | Marine Corps | Gunnery Sergeant | | | |
| Harry S. Bowman | Marine Corps | Private First Class | | | |
| Arthur D. Bownik | Navy | Hospital Apprentice Second Class | Okinawa, Ryukyu Islands | May 12, 1945 | |
| Thomas E. Boyce | Navy | Lieutenant | | | |
| David H. Boyd | Navy | Lieutenant, Junior Grade | | | |
| Donnas H. Boyd | Navy | Coxswain | | | |
| Eugene L. Boyd | Navy | Ensign | | | |
| Herschel F. Boyd | Navy | Lieutenant, Junior Grade | | | |
| Paul W. Boyd | Navy | Lieutenant, Junior Grade | | | |
| Robert W. Boyd | Marine Corps | Lieutenant Colonel | Peleliu, Palau Islands | September 15–25, 1944 | |
| Randolph B. Boyer | Navy | Lieutenant Commander | | | |
| Francis D. Boyers | Navy | Lieutenant, Junior Grade | | | |
| Gregory Boyington | Marine Corps | Major | New Britain Island area | January 3, 1944 | Shot down one enemy plane before he was shot down and captured as a POW. Also awarded the Medal of Honor for overall actions of September 12, 1943, to January 3, 1944. |
| Francis D. Boyle | Navy | Commander | | | |
| Everett V. Bradbury | Navy | Lieutenant, Junior Grade | | | |
| Robert E. Braddy Jr. | Navy | Lieutenant Commander | | | |
| John H. Bradley | Navy | Pharmacist's Mate Second Class | Iwo Jima, Volcano Islands | February 21, 1945 | |
| Phillips H. Bradley | Navy | Lieutenant, Junior Grade | | | |
| Robert G. Bradley | Navy | Lieutenant | | | |
| Russell J. Bradley | Navy | Aviation Radioman Third Class | | | |
| Thomas W. Bradley | Navy | Pharmacist's Mate Second Class | | | |
| Julian H. Brady | Navy | Lieutenant, Junior Grade | | | |
| Wallace A. Brady | Navy | Lieutenant, Junior Grade | | | |
| Nelson Braitmeyer | Marine Corps | Platoon Sergeant | | | |
| James M. Branch | Marine Corps | Private First Class | | | |
| Stuart L. Brandel | Navy | Lieutenant, Junior Grade | | | |
| LeRoy Brandon | Navy | Pharmacist's Mate First Class | | | |
| Charles E. Brannon | Navy | Ensign | | | |
| Howard H. Branyon | Navy | Chief Boatswain's Mate | | | |
| Arthur J. Brassfield | Navy | Lieutenant, Junior Grade | | | |
| Arthur J. Brassfield | Navy | Lieutenant, Junior Grade | | | |
| Raymond L. Bray | Marine Corps | Corporal | | | |
| William T. Bray | Marine Corps | Captain | | | |
| Richard F. Breckenridge | Navy | Quartermaster Second Class | | | |
| Giovanni F. Brega | Navy | Ensign | | | |
| Harold P. Brehm | Navy | Lieutenant | | | |
| Walter J. Brehm | Marine Corps | Private First Class | | | |
| James C. Brennan | Marine Corps | Captain | | | |
| Joseph J. Breslove | Navy | Lieutenant | | | |
| James H. Brett Jr. | Navy | Lieutenant Commander | | | |
| James H. Brett Jr. | Navy | Lieutenant Commander | | | |
| Charles W. Brewer | Navy | Commander | | | |
| Robert G. Brice | Navy | Lieutenant, Junior Grade | | | |
| Robert G. Brice | Navy | Lieutenant, Junior Grade | | | |
| John D. Bridgers | Navy | Lieutenant | | | |
| Robert A. Bridges | Navy | Boatswain's Mate First Class | | | |
| Francis J. Bridget | Navy | Commander | | | |
| Mark K. Bright | Navy | Lieutenant, Junior Grade | | | |
| William F. Bringle | Navy | Lieutenant Commander | | | |
| Robert P. Briscoe | Navy | Captain | | | |
| Wilson T. Bristol | Marine Corps | First Lieutenant | | | |
| Jesse M. Bristow | Navy | Lieutenant, Junior Grade | | | |
| Richard E. Britson | Navy | Lieutenant | | | |
| Lloyd A. Brixey Jr. | Marine Corps | Private First Class | | | |
| John C. Broach | Navy | Commander | | | |
| Leo D. Broach | Navy | Lieutenant, Junior Grade | | | |
| Samuel J. Brocato Jr. | Navy | Lieutenant, Junior Grade | | | |
| John W. Brock | Navy | Ensign | | | |
| Robert L. Brock | Navy | Machinist's Mate Second Class | | | |
| William H. Brockman Jr. | Navy | Lieutenant Commander | Midway | June 4, 1942 | First award |
| William H. Brockman Jr. | Navy | Lieutenant Commander | Southwest Pacific | June 10 – July 11, 1942 | Second award |
| William H. Brockman Jr. | Navy | Lieutenant Commander | Pacific Theater | December 13, 1942 – February 4, 1943 | Third award |
| John C. Broderick | Marine Corps | Private First Class | | | |
| John J. Brodhead | Navy | Lieutenant | | | |
| Robert Brodie Jr. | Navy | Lieutenant Commander | | | |
| Allen Brody | Navy | Ensign | | | |
| Orville E. Broeker | Marine Corps | Corporal | | | |
| Clyde L. Bronn | Navy | Lieutenant, Junior Grade | | | |
| Clyde L. Bronn | Navy | Lieutenant | | | |
| George M. Brooke | Navy | Commander | | | |
| Bradford M. Brooks | Navy | Lieutenant | | | |
| Charles S. Brooks | Navy | Lieutenant | | | |
| Charles S. Brooks | Navy | Lieutenant | | | |
| Louis V. Brooks | Marine Corps | Captain | | | |
| William C. Brooks Jr. | Navy | Ensign | | | |
| Roger G. B. Broome | Marine Corps | Major | | | |
| Maurice E. Browder | Navy | Captain | | | |
| Burton J. Brown | Navy | Ensign | | | |
| Carl A. Brown Jr. | Navy | Lieutenant | | | |
| Charles D. Brown | Navy | Lieutenant Commander | | | |
| Fletcher L. Brown Jr. | Marine Corps | Major | | | |
| George P. Brown | Navy | Lieutenant, Junior Grade | | | |
| Jack P. Brown | Navy | Chief Electrician's Mate | | | |
| James H. Brown | Navy | Commander | | | |
| James V. Brown | Marine Corps | Corporal | | | |
| Kenneth L. Brown | Marine Corps | Captain | | | |
| Morrison R. Brown | Navy | Lieutenant | | | |
| Robert R. Brown | Marine Corps | Second Lieutenant | | | |
| Robert S. Brown | Marine Corps | Major | | | |
| Russell E. Brown | Navy | Ensign | | | |
| Thomas E. Brown | Navy | Ensign | | | |
| Thomas M. Brown | Navy | Lieutenant Commander | | | |
| Wiley C. Brown | Marine Corps | Corporal | | | |
| William P. Brown Jr. | Marine Corps | Second Lieutenant | Okinawa, Ryukyu Islands | May 4, 1945 | First award (second, posthumously, was in Korean War) |
| George H. Browne | Navy | Commander | | | |
| Robert T. Browne | Navy | Lieutenant, Junior Grade | | | |
| Ralph L. Browner | Marine Corps | Private First Class | | | |
| Lester K. Bruestle | Navy | Ensign | | | |
| William E. Brugger | Marine Corps | Corporal | | | |
| Albert W. Brunelle | Navy | Motor Machinist's Mate Second Class | | | |
| Austin R. Brunelli | Marine Corps | Lieutenant Colonel | Iwo Jima, Volcano Islands | March 8–16, 1945 | |
| Carland E. Brunmier | Navy | Lieutenant | | | |
| Richard R. Brunnhoeffer | Marine Corps | Private | | | |
| Robert R. Brunt | Navy | Lieutenant, Junior Grade | | | |
| Frederick J. Brush | Navy | Commander | | | |
| Henry C. Bruton | Navy | Lieutenant Commander | | | |
| Henry C. Bruton | Navy | Commander | | | |
| Henry C. Bruton | Navy | Commander | | | |
| Othello C. Bruun | Navy | Chief Pay Clerk | | | |
| Brady L. Bryan | Navy | Chief Machinist's Mate | | | |
| Horace D. Bryan | Navy | Lieutenant, Junior Grade | | | |
| Robert B. Buchan | Navy | Ensign | Lae & Salamaua, New Guinea | March 10, 1942 | First award |
| Robert B. Buchan | Navy | Lieutenant, Junior Grade | Coral Sea | May 7, 1942 | Second award |
| Charles A. Buchanan | Navy | Captain | Okinawa, Ryukyu Islands | April 12, 1945 | |
| Robert L. Buchanan | Navy | Ensign | near Formosa | October 16, 1944 | Personally shot down five enemy planes in a single action |
| Richard C. Bucher | Navy | Hospital Apprentice First Class | Guam, Marianas Islands | July 29, 1944 | |
| Joseph E. Buckley | Marine Corps | Captain | Cape Gloucester, New Britain | January 6, 1944 | |
| Phil H. Bucklew | Navy | Ensign | Sicily | July 10, 1943 | First award |
| Phil H. Bucklew | Navy | Lieutenant, Junior Grade | Normandy, France | June 6, 1944 | Second award |
| Ralph R. Budd | Navy | Ensign | Kure Harbor, Japan | July 24, 1945 | |
| Joseph M. Budzynski | Marine Corps | Corporal | Iwo Jima, Volcano Islands | February 27, 1945 | |
| Harold L. Buell | Navy | Lieutenant | Philippine Sea | June 20, 1944 | |
| John C. Buh † | Marine Corps | Private First Class | Peleliu, Palau Islands | September 27, 1944 | |
| Paul D. Buie | Navy | Commander | Philippine Sea | June 11–25, 1944 | |
| John D. Bulkeley | Navy | Lieutenant | Philippines | January 18–19, 1942 | Also awarded the Medal of Honor, for overall actions over period 7 December 1941 to 10 April 1942 |
| Geary R. Bundschu † | Marine Corps | Captain | Guam, Marianas Islands | July 22, 1944 | |
| Robert L. Bungard | Marine Corps | Private First Class | Peleliu, Palau Islands | September 15–19, 1944 | |
| Ernest V. Bunn Jr. † | Marine Corps | First Lieutenant | Guam, Marianas Islands | July 21, 1944 | |
| William H. Buracker | Navy | Captain | Western Pacific | September – October 1944 | |
| Walter J. Burak | Marine Corps | Corporal | Guadalcanal, Solomon Islands | September 13–14, 1942 | |
| William O. Burch Jr. | Navy | Lieutenant Commander | near Salamaua & Lae, New Guinea | March 10, 1942 | First award |
| William O. Burch Jr. | Navy | Lieutenant Commander | Tulagi Harbor & Coral Sea | May 4, 7 & 8, 1942 | Second award |
| William O. Burch Jr. | Navy | Commander | near Formosa | January 21, 1945 | Third award |
| Ronald A. Burdo † | Marine Corps | Private First Class | Gavutu, Solomon Islands | August 7, 1942 | |
| William P. Burford | Navy | Lieutenant Commander | Pearl Harbor, Hawaii | December 7, 1941 | |
| Wilbur M. Burgess | Marine Corps | First Sergeant | Tarawa Atoll, Gilbert Islands | November 20, 1943 | |
| Joseph W. Burk | Navy | Lieutenant, Junior Grade | New Guinea & New Britain | November 1943 – January 1944 | |
| Arleigh A. Burke | Navy | Captain | Solomon Islands | October 30 – November 2, 1942 | |
| Edmund M. Burke | Navy | Lieutenant, Junior Grade | Haute-Saone Province, France | September 9, – October 17, 1944 | |
| Edward J. Burke | Navy | Commander | Anzio, Italy | January 24, 1944 | |
| Francis T. Burke | Marine Corps | Second Lieutenant | Peleliu, Palau Islands | September 19–20, 1944 | |
| Louis E. Burke Jr. | Navy | Lieutenant Commander | Kure Harbor, Japan | July 28, 1945 | |
| Phillip R. Burke | Marine Corps | Corporal | Tarawa Atoll, Gilbert Islands | November 20–21, 1943 | Threw himself on an enemy hand grenade and was seriously wounded |
| Calvin Burkhart | Navy | Ensign | Leyte Gulf, Philippines | October 25, 1944 | |
| Creed C. Burlingame | Navy | Lieutenant Commander | Pacific Theater | April 30 – June 21, 1942 | First award |
| Creed C. Burlingame | Navy | Lieutenant Commander | Pacific Theater | July 15 – September 8, 1942 | Second award |
| Creed C. Burlingame | Navy | Lieutenant Commander | Pacific Theater | December 17, 1942 – January 31, 1943 | Third award |
| Robert W. Burnett | Navy | Lieutenant, Junior Grade | Philippine Sea | June 20, 1944 | |
| Edward S. Burns | Navy | Commander | Okinawa, Ryukyu Islands | April 1–6, 1945 | |
| John A. Burns | Navy | Lieutenant, Junior Grade | near Truk | April 30, 1944 | |
| John S. Burns | Navy | Lieutenant | Lingayen Gulf, Luzon, Philippine Islands | January 6–14, 1945 | |
| William S. Burns | Navy | Lieutenant | Leyte Gulf, Philippines | October 24, 1944 | |
| Leland M. Burr † | Navy | Lieutenant Commander | near Luzon, Philippines | January 8, 1945 | |
| Albert C. Burrows | Navy | Lieutenant Commander | Western Pacific | May 10 – June 21, 1943 | |
| John C. Burrus | Navy | Lieutenant | Kure Harbor, Japan | July 24, 1945 | |
| Vilhelm K. Busck | Navy | Commander | Vella Lavella & Treasury Islands | October 1 & 27, 1943 | |
| Billy Bush | Navy | Lieutenant, Junior Grade | Philippine Sea | June 20, 1944 | |
| Edward J. Butcher | Marine Corps | Second Lieutenant | Okinawa, Ryukyu Islands | May 21, 1945 | |
| Joseph L. Butel | Navy | Ensign | Kure Harbor, Japan | July 25, 1945 | |
| Arthur H. Butler | Marine Corps | Colonel | Guam, Marianas Islands | July 21 – August 10, 1944 | |
| John A. Butler † | Marine Corps | Lieutenant Colonel | Iwo Jima, Volcano Islands | February 19 – March 5, 1945 | |
| John C. Butler † | Navy | Ensign | Midway | June 4–6, 1942 | |
| John M. Butler † | Marine Corps | Second Lieutenant | Midway | June 4, 1942 | |
| William C. Butler Jr. | Navy | Lieutenant Commander | Cape Esperance, Guadalcanal, Solomon Islands | October 11–12, 1942 | |
| Noah B. Butt Jr. | Navy | Ensign | Leyte Gulf, Philippines | October 25, 1944 | |
| John L. Butts Jr. | Navy | Lieutenant | Leyte Gulf, Philippines | October 24, 1944 | |
| Adolf B. Byrnas | Marine Corps | Private First Class | Guam, Marianas Islands | July 21, 1944 | |
| Paul V. Byrne Jr. | Navy | Lieutenant, Junior Grade | Kure Harbor, Japan | March 19, 1945 | |
| Jack A. Byrom | Navy | Chief Petty Officer | French Morocco | November 8–11, 1942 | |

== C ==
This along with the †, indicates that the Navy Cross was awarded posthumously

| Name | Service | Rank | Place of action | Date of action | Notes |
|---|---|---|---|---|---|
| Elden H. Cail | Marine Corps | Corporal | | | |
| Frank C. Caldwell | Marine Corps | Captain | | | |
| Frank Calvin | Marine Corps | Private First Class | | | |
| Osborn Cammack | Marine Corps | Private First Class | | | |
| Lewis J. Camp | Marine Corps | Sergeant Major | | | |
| Kenneth O. Campion | Marine Corps | Second Lieutenant | | | |
| Lionel A. Canejo | Marine Corps | Private First Class | | | |
| Clayton M. Canfield | Marine Corps | Second Lieutenant | | | |
| William A. Cantrel | Marine Corps | Captain | | | |
| Arlie G. Capps | Navy Reserve | Lieutenant | Near Okinawa, Japan | April 6, 1945 | |
| Eugene T. Card | Marine Corps | Sergeant | | | |
| John F. Carey | Marine Corps | Captain | | | |
| Marion E. Carl | Marine Corps | Captain | Midway | June 4, 1942 | First award |
| Marion E. Carl | Marine Corps | Captain | Guadalcanal, Solomon Islands | August 24 – September 9, 1942 | Second award, credited with shooting down 10.5 enemy planes during this period |
| Evans F. Carlson | Marine Corps | Lieutenant Colonel | Makin Atoll, Gilbert Islands | August 17–18, 1942 | Second award (first was for Nicaragua 1930–1931, primarily July 8, 1930) |
| Evans F. Carlson | Marine Corps | Lieutenant Colonel | Guadalcanal, Solomon Islands | November 4 – December 4, 1942 | Third award |
| Ted J. Carlton | Marine Corps | Private First Class | | | |
| D. A. Carson | Marine Corps | Private First Class | | | |
| Joseph M. Carson | Navy | Captain | Leyte Gulf | October 24, 1944 | |
| Andrew J. Carter Jr. | Marine Corps | Private First Class | | | |
| Dale V. Carter | Marine Corps | Second Lieutenant | | | |
| David L. Carter | Navy | Lieutenant | Philippine Sea | June 20, 1944 | |
| John W. Carter | Navy | Lieutenant, Junior Grade | Kyushu, Japan | April 7, 1945 | |
| Leo B. Case | Marine Corps | First Lieutenant | | | |
| Victor L. Case | Marine Corps | Private First Class | | | |
| Daniel F. Casey | Marine Corps | Second Lieutenant | | | |
| Donald H. Castle | Marine Corps | Captain | | | |
| William R. Castle | Marine Corps | Private First Class | | | |
| Gilbert E. Cathey | Navy | Lieutenant, Junior Grade | Sea of Japan | July 24, 1945 | |
| G. B. Cearley | Marine Corps | Private First Class | | | |
| Frank W. Celentano | Marine Corps | Private First Class | | | |
| Richard L. Cevoli | Navy | Lieutenant | Leyte Gulf | October 24-26, 1944 | |
| Bradford W. Chaffin Jr. | Marine Corps | First Lieutenant | | | |
| James Chaisson Jr. | Marine Corps | Private First Class | | | |
| William C. Chamberlin | Marine Corps | Major | | | |
| John B. Chambers | Navy | Lieutenant | Philippine Islands | November 11, 1944 | |
| John S. Chambers | Navy | Lieutenant, Junior Grade | Sea of Japan | July 24, 1945 | |
| Joseph D. R. Champagne | Marine Corps | Private First Class | | | |
| John H. Chapman Jr. | Navy | Lieutenant, Junior Grade | near Kure Harbor, Honshu, Japan | July 24, 1945 | |
| Melvin L. Chapman | Navy | Lieutenant | Leyte Gulf | October 25, 1944 | |
| Jason T. Charlton | Marine Corps | Sergeant | | | |
| Donald A. Charpentier | Marine Corps | Corporal | | | |
| Arthur L. Chauvel | Navy | Lieutenant, Junior Grade | Philippine Sea | October 24, 1944 | |
| Tom F. Cheek | Navy | Lieutenant, Junior Grade | Midway | June 4, 1942 | |
| Howell D. Chickering | Navy | Lieutenant | Okinawa, Ryukyu Islands | April 16, 1945 | |
| Alexander A. Christie | Navy | Ensign | Off the east coast of Luzon, Philippine Islands | October 24, 1944 | |
| Thomas A. Christopher | Navy | Lieutenant Commander | Bismarck Sea | December 31, 1943 and January 22, 1944 | First award |
| Thomas A. Christopher | Navy | Lieutenant Commander | Bismarck Sea | January 15, 1944 | Second award |
| Gordon Chung-Hoon | Navy | Commander | Battle of Okinawa | April 14, 1945 | Commander of the destroyer USS Sigsbee when she was crippled by a kamikaze hit, kept her antiaircraft batteries firing against the continuing Japanese air attack, while simultaneously directing the damage control efforts that allowed her to make port under her own power |
| Lewis Cladin | Marine Corps | Second Lieutenant | | | |
| Joseph L. P. G. Claing | Marine Corps | Corporal | | | |
| Robert L. Clancy | Navy | Lieutenant | Philippine Sea | October 25, 1944 | Pilot in Bombing Squadron EIGHTEEN (VB-18), attached to the U.S.S. Intrepid (CV-11) |
| Charles R. Clark Jr. | Navy | Lieutenant Commander | Sea of Japan | July 1, 1945 – August 9, 1945 | Commanding Officer of the U.S.S. Sennet (SS-408) during its FOURTH War Patrol |
| Henry E. Clark | Navy | Lieutenant | Kure Bay Area, Honshu, Japan | March 19, 1945 | Attached to the U.S.S. Hornet (CV-12), Torpedo Bombing Squadron 17 (VTB-17) |
| Lawrence A. Clark | Navy | Ensign | Near Kyushu, Japan | March 19, 1945 | Attached to the U.S.S. Essex (CV-9), Fighting Squadron 83 (VF-83) |
| Max Clark | Marine Corps | Major | | | |
| Paul L. Clark | Coast Guard | Fireman First Class | French Morocco | November 8–11, 1942 | |
| Robert C. Clarke | Navy | Lieutenant | Near Samar, Philippines | October 25, 1944 | Attached to the U.S.S. Marcus Island (CVE-77), Composite Squadron 21 (VC-21) |
| Thomas E. Clarke | Marine Corps | Captain | | | |
| Cook Cleland | Navy | Lieutenant | Philippine Sea | June 20, 1944 | Attached to the U.S.S. Lexington (CV-16), Bombing Squadron 16 (VB-16) |
| William T. Clement | Marine Corps | Colonel | Philippines | December 7, 1941 – April 28, 1942 | |
| Irving Cleveland | Marine Corps | Private First Class | | | |
| Robert L. Cliett | Navy | Lieutenant | Kure Naval Base, Japan | July 28, 1945 | Attached to the U.S.S. Bennington (CV-20), Bombing Fighting Squadron 1 (VFB-1) |
| John K. Clifford | Navy | Lieutenant, Junior Grade | Solomon Islands Area | August 24, 1942 | Attached to the U.S.S. Saratoga (CV-3), Bombing Squadron 3 (VB-3) |
| Robert J. Clinton | Navy | Lieutenant | Sea of Japan | July 24, 1945 | Attached to the U.S.S. Randolph (CV-15), Bombing Squadron 16 (VB-16) |
| Richard H. Clive † | Navy | Lieutenant, Junior Grade | Sibuyan Area | October 24, 1944 | |
| Richard L. Close | Marine Corps | Corporal | | | |
| Philip W. Cobb | Navy | Ensign | Battle of Midway | June 4–6, 1942 | First award, pilot of a carrier-based Navy Dive Bomber |
| Philip W. Cobb | Navy | Lieutenant, Junior Grade | Battle of the Eastern Solomons | August 24, 1942 | Second award, pilot of a carrier-based Navy Dive Bomber, "a determined and vigorous attack against an enemy aircraft carrier, contributing effectively to the probable destruction of that vessel" |
| Ernest H. Cochran | Navy | Ensign | Leyte Gulf, Philippines | Oct 24, 1944 | Pilot of a carrier-based Navy Combat Plane, for "a daring attack ... [which] resulted in serious damage to a major enemy warship" |
| Alvin C. Cockrell Jr. | Marine Corps | First Lieutenant | | | |
| George Codera | Marine Corps | Second Lieutenant | | | |
| James W. Coe | Navy | Lieutenant Commander | Southwest Pacific & Cam Ranh Bay | December 8, 1941 - March 1942 & April 14, 1942 - May 17, 1942 | |
| Doyle M. Coffee | Navy | Commander | Surigao Strait | October 24-25, 1944 | |
| Ralph E. Coffield | Marine Corps | Corporal | | | |
| Albert P. Coffin | Navy | Lieutenant | Near Solomon Islands | November 13-15, 1942 | |
| Thomas J. Coghlan | Navy | Lieutenant, Junior Grade | Kure Bay, Honshu, Japan | March 19, 1945 | |
| Cyrus C. Cole | Navy | Lieutenant Commander | Near New Guinea | February 6, 1944 - March 19, 1945 | |
| Edward J. Coleman | Marine Corps | Private First Class | | | |
| Roland H. Collins | Marine Corps | Captain | | | |
| Angelo M. Cona | Marine Corps | First Lieutenant | | | |
| Herbert E. Confer | Marine Corps | Private First Class | | | |
| Jack E. Conger | Marine Corps | First Lieutenant | | | |
| George E. Conklin | Marine Corps | Private | | | |
| Willard E. Conn | Marine Corps | Private First Class | | | |
| Joseph E. Connolly | Marine Corps | Corporal | | | |
| Odell M. Conoley | Marine Corps | Major | Guadalcanal, Solomon Islands | October 26, 1942 | |
| Carl E. Conron Jr. | Marine Corps | Captain | | | |
| Edward Conroy | Marine Corps | Second Lieutenant | | | |
| Anthony J. P. Conti | Marine Corps | Second Lieutenant | | | |
| Andrew F. Cook Jr. | Marine Corps | Second Lieutenant | | | |
| Dallas H. Cook | Marine Corps | Sergeant | | | |
| George E. Cook | Marine Corps | Private First Class | | | |
| Albert D. Cooley | Marine Corps | Lieutenant Colonel | Guadalcanal, Solomon Islands | September 23 – December 18, 1942 | |
| John D. Coppedge | Marine Corps | Private First Class | | | |
| Roy A. Corry Jr. | Marine Corps | Second Lieutenant | | | |
| Jimmy W. Corzine | Marine Corps | Private First Class | | | |
| John J. Cosgrove Jr. | Marine Corps | Lieutenant Colonel | | | |
| Jack Cosley | Marine Corps | Second Lieutenant | | | |
| Russell M. Cox † | Navy | Supply officer (ensign) | Guadalcanal, Solomon Islands | November 13, 1942 | Presumed dead when a Japanese submarine torpedoed and sank the USS Juneau (CL-52). The cancelled U.S. Navy destroyer escort USS Russell M. Cox (DE-774) was named for Ensign Cox. Her construction was cancelled in 1944. |
| Howard L. Cousins Jr. | Marine Corps | First Lieutenant | | | |
| Ralph H. Coyte | Marine Corps | Major | | | |
| Edward A. Craig | Marine Corps | Colonel | Guam, Marianas Islands | July 21 – August 10, 1944 | |
| Francis S. Craig Jr. | Marine Corps | First Lieutenant | | | |
| Jack R. Cram | Marine Corps | Major | | | |
| Frederick W. Cramer | Marine Corps | Private First Class | | | |
| Edgar J. Crane | Marine Corps | Captain | | | |
| Howard R. Craven | Marine Corps | Private First Class | | | |
| Lawrence N. Crawley | Marine Corps | First Lieutenant | | | |
| William W. Creamer † | Navy | Ensign | Midway | June 4, 1942 | Douglas TBD-1 Devastator torpedo bomber pilot in Torpedo Squadron 8 operating off the aircraft carrier USS Hornet (CV-8) at the Battle of Midway, Creamer was killed attacking a Japanese aircraft carrier |
| Leonard B. Cresswell | Marine Corps | Lieutenant Colonel | Guadalcanal, Solomon Islands | August 21, 1942 | |
| Hubert D. Crotts | Marine Corps | Corporal | | | |
| William L. Crouch | Marine Corps | Major | | | |
| Henry P. Crowe | Marine Corps | Major | Tarawa Atoll, Gilbert Islands | November 20–22, 1943 | |
| William E. Crowe | Marine Corps | Captain | | | |
| Robert F. Crowton | Marine Corps | Second Lieutenant | | | |
| Billie J. Crumpton | Marine Corps | Private | | | |
| Lloyd E. Crusan | Marine Corps | Sergeant | | | |
| Daniel L. Cummings | Marine Corps | Second Lieutenant | | | |
| Narcissus G. Cunico | Marine Corps | Private | | | |
| James N. Cupp | Marine Corps | Captain | | | |
| Robert P. Curran | Marine Corps | First Lieutenant | | | |
| Ralph H. Currin | Marine Corps | Captain | | | |
| Robert E. Curtin | Marine Corps | Captain | | | |
| Robert E. Cushman Jr. | Marine Corps | Lieutenant Colonel | Guam, Marianas Islands | July 21 – August 20, 1944 | |
| John W. Czaja | Marine Corps | Private First Class | | | |

== D ==
This along with the †, indicates that the Navy Cross was awarded posthumously

| Name | Service | Rank | Place of action | Date of action | Notes |
|---|---|---|---|---|---|
| Alfred J. Daigle | Marine Corps | Corporal | | | |
| John J. Dalton | Marine Corps | Second Lieutenant | | | |
| Cleo S. Danford Jr. | Marine Corps | Corporal | | | |
| Hugh S. Daniel | Marine Corps | Private First Class | | | |
| Willard A. Darling | Marine Corps | Corporal | | | |
| Clifford R. Dartt | Marine Corps | Private | | | |
| Carl R. Davidson | Marine Corps | Second Lieutenant | | | |
| Ira Davidson | Marine Corps | Warrant Officer | | | |
| Arthur V. Davis | Marine Corps | Sergeant | | | |
| Cecil B. Davis Jr. | Marine Corps | Corporal | | | |
| Milton G. Davis | Marine Corps | Private First Class | | | |
| Leonard K. Davis | Marine Corps | Major | | | |
| Raymond G. Davis | Marine Corps | Major | Peleliu, Palau Islands | September 15–22, 1944 | Later awarded the Medal of Honor in the Korean War. |
| Hector De Zayas | Marine Corps | Lieutenant Colonel | | | |
| Delmer C. Deckard | Marine Corps | Private First Class | | | |
| Armond H. DeLalio | Marine Corps | Captain | Midway | June 4–5, 1942 | |
| Carmen Delia | Marine Corps | Corporal | | | |
| Robert A. DeLong | Marine Corps | First Lieutenant | | | |
| Weldon F. DeLong | Marine Corps | Corporal | | | |
| Crescenzo P. DeMatteis | Marine Corps | Corporal | | | |
| Hugh V. Denton | Marine Corps | Private First Class | | | |
| Conrad C. DeRouen | Marine Corps | Second Lieutenant | | | |
| James P. Devereux | Marine Corps | Major | Wake Island | December 7–22, 1941 | POW |
| Leroy Diamond | Marine Corps | Corporal | | | |
| One W. Dickens | Marine Corps | Sergeant | | | |
| Anthony Dicristofaro | Marine Corps | Sergeant | | | |
| Stanley Dierker | Marine Corps | Private First Class | | | |
| Edward J. Dillon | Marine Corps | Lieutenant Colonel | | | |
| Emmett L. Dimon | Marine Corps | Sergeant | | | |
| Clarence J. Dishmon | Marine Corps | Private First Class | | | |
| James H. Dixon | Marine Corps | Corporal | | | |
| John F. Dobbin | Marine Corps | Major | | | |
| Howard W. Dodd | Marine Corps | Private First Class | | | |
| David D. Doerr | Marine Corps | Gunnery Sergeant | | | |
| Camille J. Doiron | Marine Corps | Sergeant | | | |
| David O. Dolan | Marine Corps | Corporal | | | |
| Archie G. Donahue | Marine Corps | Major | over Okinawa, Ryukyu Islands | April 12, 1945 | Personally shot down five enemy planes in a single action |
| James C. Donnelly | Marine Corps | Private First Class | | | |
| Jefferson D. Dorroh Jr. | Marine Corps | Major | | | |
| Edmund J. Dorsogna | Marine Corps | Private First Class | | | |
| Charles E. Douglas | Marine Corps | Gunnery Sergeant | | | |
| Cecil J. Doyle | Marine Corps | Second Lieutenant | | | |
| Charles W. Drake | Marine Corps | First Lieutenant | | | |
| Joe R. Driskell | Marine Corps | Corporal | | | |
| Billy J. Driver | Marine Corps | Corporal | | | |
| Frank C. Drury | Marine Corps | First Lieutenant | | | |
| Rea E. Duncan | Marine Corps | Captain | | | |
| Edward H. Dunham | Marine Corps | Corporal | | | |
| Harry Dunn Jr. | Marine Corps | Private | | | |
| James Dunn Jr. | Marine Corps | Private First Class | | | |
| Charles R. Durfee | Marine Corps | Captain | | | |
| Julian D. Dusenbury | Marine Corps | Captain | | | |
| Nicholas Dwornitski | Marine Corps | Corporal | | | |
| Martin R. Dyer Jr. | Marine Corps | Corporal | | | |

== E ==
This along with the †, indicates that the Navy Cross was awarded posthumously

| Name | Service | Rank | Place of action | Date of action | Notes |
|---|---|---|---|---|---|
| Wesley Eagle | Marine Corps | Private | | | |
| William O. Eareckson | Army Air Forces | Colonel | Attu, Alaska | June – August 1942 | |
| Henry E. Eccles | Navy | Commander | Badoeng Straits | 19-20 February 1942 | Commanding USS John D. Edwards (DD 216) |
| William A. Eddy Jr. | Marine Corps | Captain | | | |
| Charles R. Edgar | Marine Corps | Corporal | | | |
| Merritt A. Edson | Marine Corps | Colonel | Tulagi, Solomon Islands | August 7–9, 1942 | Second award (first was in Nicaragua, 1928), later awarded the Medal of Honor at Guadalcanal |
| Bruce H. Ek | Marine Corps | Second Lieutenant | | | |
| William W. Eldridge Jr. | Marine Corps | First Lieutenant | | | |
| Emil Elias | Marine Corps | Corporal | | | |
| Ellsbury B. Elliott | Marine Corps | Gunnery Sergeant | | | |
| Theodore O. Erickson | Marine Corps | Private First Class | | | |
| Arthur B. Ervin | Marine Corps | Corporal | | | |
| Charles J. Eusey | Marine Corps | Captain | | | |
| Clarence L. Evans | Marine Corps | Private First Class | | | |
| Raymond J. Evans | Coast Guard | Chief Signalman | Guadalcanal, Solomon Islands | September 27, 1942 | |
| Winfred L. Evans † | Navy | Chief Quartermaster | Near Savo Island, Solomon Islands | November 12-13, 1942 | |
| Loren D. Everton | Marine Corps | Captain | over Guadalcanal, Solomon Islands | August – October 1942 | Shot down seven enemy planes during this period |

== F ==
This along with the †, indicates that the Navy Cross was awarded posthumously

| Name | Service | Rank | Place of action | Date of action | Notes |
|---|---|---|---|---|---|
| Francis L. Fagan | Marine Corps | Captain | | | First award |
| Francis L. Fagan | Marine Corps | Captain | | | Second award |
| Richard Fagan | Marine Corps | Major | Iwo Jima, Volcano Islands | February 24, 1945 | |
| Theodore C. Fajardo | Marine Corps | Second Lieutenant | | | |
| Hubert J. Faltyn | Marine Corps | Sergeant | | | |
| Henry P. Farine | Marine Corps | Private First Class | | | |
| William Farrell | Marine Corps | First Lieutenant | | | |
| James A. Faulkingham | Marine Corps | Corporal | | | |
| James C. O. Faulkner | Marine Corps | Sergeant | | | |
| Leo D. Fay † | Navy | Ensign | Pacific War Area | | |
| Michael P. Fedorak | Marine Corps | Sergeant | | | |
| Isidore Fessler | Marine Corps | Private First Class | | | |
| Walter Fieguth | Marine Corps | Platoon Sergeant | | | |
| Robert C. Filip | Marine Corps | Private | | | |
| Byron E. Fisher | Marine Corps | First Lieutenant | | | |
| William M. Fleming | Marine Corps | First Lieutenant | | | |
| Eugene B. Fluckey | Navy | Lieutenant Commander | Pacific War Area | May 21, 1944 - July 9, 1944 | Also awarded Medal of Honor, First Award |
| Eugene B. Fluckey | Navy | Commander | Luzon Straits | August 4, 1944 - October 0, 1944 | Second Award |
| Eugene B. Fluckey | Navy | Commander | East China Sea | October 27, 1944 - November 25, 1944 | Third Award |
| Eugene B. Fluckey | Navy | Commander | East China Sea | June 8, 1945 - 2 August 2, 1945 | Fourth Award |
| John G. Folsom | Marine Corps | Corporal | | | |
| Paul J. Fontana | Marine Corps | Major | over Guadalcanal, Solomon Islands | November 11–14, 1942 | |
| Raymond H. Forbus | Marine Corps | Corporal | | | |
| Ralph W. Fordyce | Marine Corps | Corporal | | | |
| Harold P. Forsythe | Marine Corps | Private First Class | | | |
| Joseph A. L. Fournier | Marine Corps | First Lieutenant | | | |
| Myles C. Fox | Marine Corps | First Lieutenant | | | |
| Robert L. Frank | Marine Corps | Captain | | | |
| William O. Franklin | Marine Corps | First Lieutenant | | | |
| Robert Fransko | Marine Corps | Private First Class | | | |
| Kenneth D. Frazier | Marine Corps | Second Lieutenant | | | |
| Eugene J. Frederick Jr. | Marine Corps | Private First Class | | | |
| Neldon T. French | Marine Corps | Corporal | | | |
| Herbert C. Freuler | Marine Corps | Captain | | | |
| Hugh D. Fricks | Marine Corps | First Lieutenant | | | |
| Julian N. Frisbie | Marine Corps | Colonel | Cape Gloucester, New Britain | December 26, 1943 – January 16, 1944 | |
| Raymond Frybarger Jr. | Marine Corps | Private First Class | | | |
| Walter J. Fufidio | Marine Corps | Assistant Cook | | | |
| Robert G. Fuller | Marine Corps | Private First Class | | | |

== G ==
This along with the †, indicates that the Navy Cross was awarded posthumously

| Name | Service | Rank | Place of action | Date of action | Notes |
|---|---|---|---|---|---|
| Guy L. Gabaldon | Marine Corps | Private First Class | Saipan and Tinian, Marianas Islands | June 15 – August 1, 1944 | Single-handedly captured over 1,000 enemy civilians and troops |
| Willard F. Gabriel | Marine Corps | Private First Class | | | |
| Leo M. Gagnon | Marine Corps | Private | | | |
| Frank J. Gambino | Marine Corps | Assistant Cook | | | |
| Frank E. Garretson | Marine Corps | Captain | | | |
| Nolen M. Garrett | Marine Corps | Sergeant | | | |
| Charles R. Gates | Army Air Forces | First Lieutenant | Tokyo Bay | August 13, 1945 | |
| George H. Gay Jr. | Navy | Ensign | Battle of Midway | June 4, 1942 | "Pilot of a carrier-based [USS Hornet] Navy Torpedo Plane of Torpedo Squadron 8 (VT-8)... without fighter protection, and with insufficient fuel to return to his carrier ... delivered an effective torpedo attack" |
| Roy M. Gay | Marine Corps | Sergeant | | | |
| Gordon D. Gayle | Marine Corps | Major | | | |
| Oswald J. Gaynier † | Navy | Ensign | Battle of Midway | June 4, 1942 | In a detachment of six new Grumman TBF Avenger aircraft, assigned to join the existing Torpedo Squadron 8 (VT-8) of USS Hornet, the detachment participated in the uncoordinated attack at Midway Island by USN, USMC, and USAAF aircraft on the morning of 4 June against the Japanese Carrier Striking Force. Lacking fighter protection and overwhelmed by Japanese Mitsubishi A6M Zero interceptors, Gaynier and most of the detachment were shot down and killed. |
| Wilbur J. Gehrke | Marine Corps | First Lieutenant | | | |
| Roy S. Geiger | Marine Corps | Major General | Guadalcanal, Solomon Islands | September 3 – November 4, 1942 | Second award (first was in World War I) |
| Martin L. Gelshenen | Marine Corps | Second Lieutenant | | | |
| James L. Gerst | Marine Corps | Sergeant | | | |
| Steve Gerycz | Marine Corps | Sergeant | | | |
| Clifford R. Gilbert | Marine Corps | Private First Class | | | |
| Warren C. Gill | Coast Guard | Lieutenant, Junior Grade | Salerno, Italy | September 9, 1943 | |
| Richard R. Gill | Marine Corps | Private First Class | | | |
| Theodore B. Gilliland | Marine Corps | Sergeant | | | |
| Warren L. Givens | Marine Corps | Private First Class | | | |
| Robert S. Glenn | Marine Corps | First Lieutenant | | | |
| Elmer G. Glidden Jr. | Marine Corps | Captain | | | |
| Elmer G. Glidden Jr. | Marine Corps | Captain | | | |
| Edward R. Godwin | Marine Corps | Sergeant | | | |
| Herbert B. Goff Jr. | Marine Corps | Corporal | | | |
| William A. Goff | Marine Corps | Private First Class | | | |
| Richard R. P. Goheen | Marine Corps | First Lieutenant | | | |
| James F. Goldman | Marine Corps | Private First Class | | | |
| Victor E. Goslin | Marine Corps | Corporal | | | |
| Angus R. Goss | Marine Corps | Gunnery Sergeant | | | |
| Andrew Govel | Marine Corps | Private First Class | | | |
| George F. Grady | Marine Corps | Private First Class | | | |
| Hugh E. Graham Jr. | Marine Corps | Corporal | | | |
| Everett B. Grassi | Marine Corps | Private First Class | | | |
| Thomas J. Gratzek | Marine Corps | Second Lieutenant | | | |
| John C. Gravitt | Marine Corps | First Lieutenant | | | |
| Philip R. Gray | Marine Corps | Captain | | | |
| Robert L. Gray | Marine Corps | Private | | | |
| Steven T. Gray | Marine Corps | Private | | | |
| George H. Grazier | Marine Corps | Private | | | |
| Charles E. Green | Marine Corps | Platoon Sergeant | | | |
| Daniel M. Green | Marine Corps | Private First Class | | | |
| James H. Green | Marine Corps | Second Lieutenant | | | |
| Edgar G. Greene | Marine Corps | First Lieutenant | | | |
| Thomas A. Gribbin II | Marine Corps | Second Lieutenant | | | |
| George William Grider | Navy | Lieutenant Commander | | | |
| William A. Griffin | Marine Corps | Private First Class | | | |
| Samuel B. Griffith II | Marine Corps | Lieutenant Colonel | Guadalcanal, Solomon Islands | September 27, 1942 | |
| William H. Grissim III | Marine Corps | Second Lieutenant | | | |
| John M. Gross | Marine Corps | Private First Class | | | |
| Dominick J. Grossi | Marine Corps | Second Lieutenant | | | |
| Robert W. Grove | Marine Corps | Corporal | | | |
| Guiseppe Guilano Jr. | Marine Corps | Gunnery Sergeant | | | |

== H ==
This along with the †, indicates that the Navy Cross was awarded posthumously

| Name | Service | Rank | Place of action | Date of action | Notes |
|---|---|---|---|---|---|
| Roger A. Haberman | Marine Corps | First Lieutenant | | | |
| Elmer Hacker | Marine Corps | Private First Class | | | |
| Bruno P. Hagedorn | Marine Corps | Second Lieutenant | | | |
| Henry W. Hahn | Marine Corps | Corporal | Battle of Peleliu | September 15-6, 1944 | On September 15, 1944, 3rd Battalion, 1st Marines Regiment, 1st Marine Division was in action against Japanese forces on Peleliu. Hahn was engaged as a Squad Leader of an assault platoon in Company K. He saw that the Japanese were installing a machine gun in a position that posed a serious threat to his squad, and so crawled to the Japanese gun location where he threw hand grenades and captured the gun after three of the four soldiers who were installing it were killed and the other fled. After capturing the gun, Hahn led his men in a running assault against Japanese defenses at the north end of the beach, winning new positions for the Marines. During the night of the September 15, and the following early morning, the Japanese troops launched strong counterattacks. Hahn directed his unit's fire and was instrumental in the defence of the new positions. Later on in the day of the 16th, Hahn received a shrapnel wound but continued to lead his squad in a reconnaissance patrol. During this they encountered superior enemy forces, but Hahn led his men in driving back the Japanese. He allowed his own evacuation only after the mission was accomplished and he had led the squad back behind US lines. |
| Orville P. Hahn | Marine Corps | Private First Class | | | |
| Thomas E. Hailey | Marine Corps | Sergeant | | | |
| Charles R. Gates | Army Air Forces | Major General | Nauru Island & Tarawa Atoll | April 20–23, 1943 | |
| Robert Hall | Army | Lieutenant Colonel | Guadalcanal, Solomon Islands | October 24–25, 1942 | |
| William C. Hall | Marine Corps | Colonel | | | |
| Delbert W. Halsey † | Navy | Ensign | Midway | June 4, 1942 | Ensign Halsey was killed in the Battle of Midway when his Bombing Squadron 6 Douglas SBD Dauntless dive bomber operating from USS Enterprise was shot down |
| Alex Haluchak | Marine Corps | Corporal | | | |
| Henry B. Hamilton | Marine Corps | Gunner | | | |
| Joseph F. Hankins | Marine Corps | Lieutenant Colonel | | | |
| Eugene R. Hanks | Navy | Lieutenant, Junior Grade | Gilbert and Marshall Islands Areas | 19 to 24 November 1943 | |
| Robert M. Hanna | Marine Corps | Second Lieutenant | | | |
| William T. Hanna | Marine Corps | Private | | | |
| Edward H. Hansberry | Marine Corps | Corporal | | | |
| Chris M. R. Hansen | Marine Corps | First Lieutenant | | | |
| Herman Hansen Jr. | Marine Corps | Major | | | |
| Leslie E. Hansen | Marine Corps | Private First Class | | | |
| Paul L. Hansen | Marine Corps | Private First Class | | | |
| Richard O. Hansen | Marine Corps | First Lieutenant | | | |
| Robert M. Hanson | Marine Corps | First Lieutenant | | | |
| Lee H. Hardee | Marine Corps | Platoon Sergeant | | | |
| Warren G. Harding | Marine Corps | Private First Class | | | |
| Robert Harkness | Marine Corps | Platoon Sergeant | | | |
| Harold E. Harper | Marine Corps | First Sergeant | | | |
| Stewart E. Harrelson | Marine Corps | Corporal | | | |
| Keith J. Harrer | Marine Corps | Private First Class | | | |
| Boone T. Harris | Marine Corps | Private First Class | | | |
| Henry A. Harrison Jr. | Marine Corps | Private First Class | | | |
| Lawrence A. Harrison | Marine Corps | Platoon Sergeant | | | |
| Franklin A. Hart | Marine Corps | Colonel | Kwajalein Atoll, Marshall Islands | February 1–2, 1944 | |
| Colin C. Harvey | Marine Corps | Private First Class | | | |
| Frederick B. Harvey Jr. | Marine Corps | First Lieutenant | | | |
| Elton L. Hatler | Marine Corps | Private | | | |
| Harold R. Hazelwood | Marine Corps | Technical Sergeant | | | |
| James G. Headley | Marine Corps | Captain | | | |
| James G. Headley | Marine Corps | Captain | | | |
| Oswald J. Hedlund | Marine Corps | Corporal | | | |
| Thomas M. Hegerty | Marine Corps | Private First Class | | | |
| John D. Heim | Marine Corps | Platoon Sergeant | | | |
| Ira E. Heinen | Marine Corps | Private First Class | | | |
| Herbert Helpingstine | Marine Corps | Corporal | | | |
| Charles W. Hemenway | Marine Corps | Private First Class | | | |
| Don C. Hempstead Jr. | Marine Corps | First Lieutenant | | | |
| Lofton R. Henderson | Marine Corps | Major | | | |
| Daniel J. Hennessy | Marine Corps | Captain | | | |
| Warren R. Herbst | Marine Corps | Corporal | | | |
| Leo D. Hermle | Marine Corps | Brigadier General | Iwo Jima, Volcano Islands | February 19 – March 26, 1945 | |
| Nicolas Hernandez | Marine Corps | Corporal | | | |
| Raymon W. Herndon | Marine Corps | Private First Class | | | |
| Robert J. Herwig | Marine Corps | Second Lieutenant | | | |
| Henry Kent Hewitt | Navy | Vice Admiral | Salerno, Allied invasion of Italy | September 1943 | Second award, Commander of the Western Naval Task Force, conveying, protecting and landing the US Fifth Army at Salerno (first was in WWII) |
| George Heyliger | Marine Corps | Private First Class | | | |
| Charles R. Hickox Jr. | Marine Corps | First Lieutenant | | | |
| Charles C. Hill | Marine Corps | Private First Class | | | |
| Eugene L. Hill | Marine Corps | Sergeant | | | |
| Robert E. Hill | Marine Corps | Lieutenant Colonel | | | |
| Robert E. Hill | Marine Corps | Lieutenant Colonel | | | |
| Clifford C. Hills | Marine Corps | Platoon Sergeant | | | |
| Robert J. Hilsky | Marine Corps | Private | | | |
| John R. Himelrick | Marine Corps | Private First Class | | | |
| Raymond K. Hine † | Army Air Forces | First Lieutenant | Solomon Islands | April 18, 1943 | |
| Harold L. Hiner | Marine Corps | Second Lieutenant | | | |
| James A. Hirshfield | Coast Guard | Commander | Atlantic War area | February 22, 1943 | |
| Herbert J. Hodges | Marine Corps | Private First Class | | | |
| Raymond G. Hoffman | Marine Corps | Sergeant | | | |
| Fred Hofmann Jr. | Marine Corps | Corporal | | | |
| Wilbur E. Hofmann Jr. | Marine Corps | First Lieutenant | | | |
| Arnold C. Hofstetter | Marine Corps | First Lieutenant | | | |
| William F. Hogaboom | Marine Corps | First Lieutenant | | | |
| Willard B. Holdredge | Marine Corps | First Lieutenant | | | |
| Lawrence H. Holdren | Marine Corps | Platoon Sergeant | | | |
| John W. Holland | Marine Corps | Captain | | | |
| Besby F. Holmes | Army Air Forces | Captain | Solomon Islands | April 18, 1943 | |
| Rommie L. Holt | Marine Corps | First Lieutenant | | | |
| Russell E. Honsowetz | Marine Corps | Lieutenant Colonel | | | |
| Thomas D. Hopkins Jr. | Marine Corps | First Lieutenant | | | |
| Ernest W. Horak | Marine Corps | Private First Class | Eniwetok Atoll, Marshall Islands | November 22, 1944 | As a Member of an Assault Unit of Company H, Second Battalion, Twenty-Second Marines (Reinforced), First Provisional Marine Brigade, in action against enemy Japanese forces on Parry, Eniwetok Atoll, Marshall Islands, 22 February 1944. Assuming command of his squad when his corporal was hit during the initial phase of the assault, Private First Class Horak courageously led his men forward through heavy machine-gun and mortar fire and although momentarily knocked unconscious by a shell fragment, covered the squad's advance with a carbine until it was hot from his hands by machine-gun fire. Taking over the squad's machine gun when the operator was struck by mortar fire, he successfully silenced the enemy's automatic weapons in the area. |
| Thomas M. Horne | Marine Corps | First Lieutenant | | | |
| Ralph L. Houser | Marine Corps | Lieutenant Colonel | Guam, Marianas Islands | July 21–23, 1944 | |
| Curtis W. Howard † | Navy | Lieutenant, junior grade | Midway | June 4, 1942 | During the Battle of Midway his Torpedo Squadron 3 Douglas TBD-1 Devastator torpedo bomber was shot down while attacking Imperial Japanese Navy aircraft carriers. |
| Samuel L. Howard | Marine Corps | Colonel | Philippines | December 7, 1941 – May 6, 1942 | POW |
| Stanley L. Howard | Marine Corps | Private First Class | | | |
| Donald S. Howell | Marine Corps | Private First Class | | | |
| Virgil Huddleston | Marine Corps | Private First Class | | | |
| Lewis C. Hudson | Marine Corps | Lieutenant Colonel | Iwo Jima, Volcano Islands | February 19–20, 1945 | |
| Daniel W. Hudspeth | Marine Corps | Sergeant | | | |
| Stanley S. Hughes | Marine Corps | First Lieutenant | Cape Gloucester, New Britain | January 4, 1944 | First award (Second was in Vietnam War, 1968) |
| Donald L. Hull | Marine Corps | Sergeant | | | |
| William C. Humberd | Marine Corps | Captain | | | |
| Robert J. Hund | Marine Corps | Private First Class | | | |
| William J. Hunniford Jr. | Marine Corps | Platoon Sergeant | | | |
| George P. Hunt | Marine Corps | Captain | | | |
| Wilfred A. Hunt | Marine Corps | Private First Class | | | |
| James B. Hunter Jr. | Marine Corps | Second Lieutenant | | | |
| Kenneth E. Huntington | Marine Corps | Second Lieutenant | | | |
| Edward H. Hurst | Marine Corps | Lieutenant Colonel | Okinawa, Ryukyu Islands | May 18, 1945 | |
| Joseph Huszarik Jr. | Marine Corps | Corporal | | | |
| George F. Hyland | Marine Corps | Gunnery Sergeant | | | |

== I ==
This along with the †, indicates that the Navy Cross was awarded posthumously

| Name | Service | Rank | Place of action | Date of action | Notes |
|---|---|---|---|---|---|
| John G. Ioanna | Marine Corps | Private First Class | | | |
| Toivo H. Ivary | Marine Corps | Second Lieutenant | | | |
| Ivan B. Iversen | Marine Corps | Corporal | | | |
| Daniel Iverson | Marine Corps | First Lieutenant | | | |

== J ==
This along with the †, indicates that the Navy Cross was awarded posthumously

| Name | Service | Rank | Place of action | Date of action | Notes |
|---|---|---|---|---|---|
| Thomas E. Jabour | Marine Corps | Private First Class | | | |
| Whitney W. Jacobs | Marine Corps | Private | | | |
| Robert J. Jamison | Marine Corps | Private First Class | | | |
| Michael M. Janic | Marine Corps | Corporal | | | |
| Melvin L. Jarvis | Marine Corps | First Lieutenant | | | |
| Charles O. Jeanes | Marine Corps | Private First Class | | | |
| Vincent Jendeski | Marine Corps | Sergeant | | | In same company (A/1/7) as fellow Navy Cross recipient PFC Joseph E Nugent |
| Alvin J. Jensen | Marine Corps | Second Lieutenant | | | |
| George E. Jerue | Marine Corps | First Lieutenant | | | |
| Maurice D. Jester | Coast Guard | Lieutenant Commander | off North Carolina | May 9, 1942 | |
| Robert W. Johnsmiller | Marine Corps | Corporal | | | |
| Chandler W. Johnson | Marine Corps | Lieutenant Colonel | Iwo Jima, Volcano Islands | February 19 – March 2, 1945 | |
| Charles E. Johnson | Marine Corps | Private First Class | | | |
| Donald W. Johnson | Marine Corps | Corporal | | | |
| John G. Johnson | Marine Corps | Lieutenant Colonel | | | |
| Roy W. Johnson | Marine Corps | Sergeant | | | |
| Wallace W. Johnson | Marine Corps | Corporal | | | |
| Samuel D. Johnston | Marine Corps | Gunnery Sergeant | | | |
| Harold B. Jones | Marine Corps | Private | | | |
| Louis R. Jones | Marine Corps | Colonel | Saipan and Tinian, Marianas Islands | June 15 – August 2, 1944 | |
| Robert E. Jones | Marine Corps | Private | | | |
| William K. Jones | Marine Corps | Lieutenant Colonel | Saipan and Tinian, Marianas Islands | June 15 – August 1, 1944 | |
| Donald R. Jordan | Marine Corps | Private First Class | | | |
| George C. Jovanovich | Marine Corps | Second Lieutenant | | | |
| Jesse P. Julian | Marine Corps | First Lieutenant | | | |
| Cedric Jurgens | Marine Corps | Private First Class | | | |
| Frank W. Justice | Marine Corps | Platoon Sergeant | | | |

== K ==
This along with the †, indicates that the Navy Cross was awarded posthumously

| Name | Service | Rank | Place of action | Date of action | Notes |
|---|---|---|---|---|---|
| Roland F. Kachinsky | Marine Corps | Platoon Sergeant | | | |
| Lauren H. Kahn | Marine Corps | Private First Class | | | |
| William E. Kail | Marine Corps | Private First Class | | | |
| Demosthenes V. Katsulis | Marine Corps | Private First Class | | | |
| Willis L. Kay | Marine Corps | First Lieutenant | | | |
| Charles P. Keane | Marine Corps | Private | | | |
| Edward C. Keeley | Marine Corps | First Lieutenant | | | |
| Jack Keiningham | Marine Corps | Corporal | | | |
| Willard W. Keith Jr. | Marine Corps | Captain | | | |
| Clarence O. Kelley | Marine Corps | Private First Class | | | |
| Maynard C. Kelley | Marine Corps | First Lieutenant | | | |
| Frederick A. Kellogg | Marine Corps | Second Lieutenant | | | |
| Donald J. Kelly | Marine Corps | Private | | | |
| Edward F. Kelly | Marine Corps | Corporal | | | |
| C. J. Kelton | Marine Corps | Private First Class | | | |
| Charles R. Kennedy | Marine Corps | Platoon Sergeant | | | |
| Howard N. Kenyon | Marine Corps | Colonel | | | |
| John I. Kerns | Marine Corps | Private | | | |
| William T. Ketcham Jr. | Marine Corps | Captain | | | |
| Eugene M. Key | Marine Corps | First Lieutenant | | | |
| Dixie Kiefer | Navy | Commander | Battle of Midway | June 7, 1942 | For heroism and service as Executive Officer of the USS Yorktown (CV-5) |
| Charles J. Kimmel | Marine Corps | Second Lieutenant | | | |
| John O. Kincaid Jr. | Marine Corps | Corporal | | | |
| Luke A. Kingsley Jr. | Marine Corps | Private First Class | | | |
| Emmett F. Kirby | Marine Corps | Private First Class | | | |
| Harry Kizirian | Marine Corps | Private First Class | | | |
| George S. Klatt | Marine Corps | Platoon Sergeant | | | |
| Robert R. Klingman | Marine Corps | First Lieutenant | | | |
| John Klunk | Marine Corps | Private First Class | | | |
| Frank P. Knoll | Marine Corps | Captain | Peleliu, Palau Islands | September 15 – October 6, 1944 | |
| Daniel Koll | Marine Corps | Private First Class | | | |
| Charles E. Kollmann | Marine Corps | Second Lieutenant | | | |
| Louis Komnenich | Marine Corps | Private First Class | | | |
| William O. Koontz | Marine Corps | Platoon Sergeant | | | |
| Stanley D. Kops | Marine Corps | Platoon Sergeant | | | |
| Michael R. Kost | Marine Corps | Sergeant | | | |
| Anthony B. Kouma | Marine Corps | Corporal | | | |
| George E. Koutelas | Marine Corps | Second Lieutenant | | | |
| John Koval | Marine Corps | Platoon Sergeant | | | |
| Leonard Krenzer | Marine Corps | Second Lieutenant | | | |
| Victor H. Krulak | Marine Corps | Lieutenant Colonel | Choiseul Island, Solomon Islands | October 28 – November 3, 1943 | |
| Charles M. Kunz | Marine Corps | First Lieutenant | | | |

== L ==
This along with the †, indicates that the Navy Cross was awarded posthumously

| Name | Service | Rank | Place of action | Date of action | Notes |
|---|---|---|---|---|---|
| Robert M. La Prade † | Marine Corps | First Lieutenant | Guadalcanal campaign | January 20, 1943 | The President of the United States of America takes pride in presenting the Navy Cross (Posthumously) to Second Lieutenant Robert M. LaPrade (MCSN: 0-9775), United States Marine Corps Reserve, for extraordinary heroism and distinguished service while serving with the SECOND Marine Division during action against enemy Japanese forces on Guadalcanal, Solomon Islands, on 20 January 1943. Operating behind the enemy lines, Lieutenant LaPrade, in command of a combat patrol which wiped out one enemy machine gun position, was critically wounded twice and his second in command incapacitated by enemy machine-gun fire. Despite his insistence that they leave him behind, First Lieutenant LaPrade was carried back to our lines where, with unfaltering disregard for his own ebbing strength, he continued to give orders concerning directions and formations until he lost consciousness. His indomitable fighting spirit and inspiring devotion to the accomplishment of an important mission were in keeping with the highest traditions of the United States Naval Service. He gallantly gave up his life in the service of his country. |
| Charles T. Lamb | Marine Corps | Second Lieutenant | | | |
| Lawrence A. Lang | Marine Corps | Gunnery Sergeant | | | |
| N. J. Langford | Marine Corps | Platoon Sergeant | | | |
| John R. Lanigan | Marine Corps | Colonel | Iwo Jima, Volcano Islands | February 19 – March 16, 1945 | |
| Thomas G. Lanphier Jr. | Army Air Forces | Captain | Solomon Islands | April 18, 1943 | |
| James J. Laquintano | Marine Corps | Sergeant | | | |
| Leor B. Larsen | Marine Corps | Second Lieutenant | | | |
| Niles Larson | | | | | |
| Donald Lasco | Marine Corps | Private First Class | | | |
| Darius W. Latch | Marine Corps | Private First Class | | | |
| Claude E. Lauderdale | Marine Corps | Sergeant | | | |
| Willard R. Laughon | Navy | Lieutenant Commander | Java–Celebes Sea | 19 February 1944 to 4 April 1944 | The President of the United States of America takes pleasure in presenting the Navy Cross to Commander [then Lieutenant Commander] Willard Ross Laughon, United States Navy, for extraordinary heroism in the line of his profession as Commanding Officer of the U.S.S. RASHER (SS-269), on the THIRD War Patrol of that submarine during the period 19 February 1944 to 4 April 1944, in the Celebes. Vigilant and determined in his search for enemy shipping, Commander Laughon penetrated hazardous Japanese-infested waters and, upon contact with the enemy struck swiftly and with tremendous force to sink five hostile ships totaling 28,502 tons and damage seriously a 7,064-ton vessel. Unfaltering in the fulfillment of his hazardous assignment, he executed a daring reconnaissance mission in the face of intense hostile anti-submarine measures and, handling his ship with swift, evasive tactics succeeded in bringing the RASHER safe to port without injury to ship or crew. Commander Laughon's staunch courage, professional skill and indomitable fighting spirit throughout a perilous mission reflect great credit upon himself, his valiant command and the United States Naval Service. |
| Willard R. Laughon | Navy | Commander | Makassar Strait-Celebes Sea | 30 April 1944 to 23 June 1944 | The President of the United States of America takes pleasure in presenting a Gold Star in lieu of a Second Award of the Navy Cross to Commander Willard Ross Laughon, United States Navy, for extraordinary heroism in the line of his profession as Commanding Officer of the U.S.S. RASHER (SS-269), on the FOURTH War Patrol of that submarine during the period 30 April 1944 to 23 June 1944, in enemy controlled waters in the Celebes. Skillfully employing all resources at his command against enemy shipping in his area of operation, Commander Laughon executed several well-planned and highly aggressive attacks and, despite severe enemy countermeasures, succeeded in sinking five Japanese vessels totaling 24,410 tons and in damaging five others totaling 20,900 tons. His expert seamanship, daring initiative and unfaltering devotion to duty in the face of grave danger reflect the highest credit upon Commander Laughon and the United States Naval Service. |
| Alvin W. Lawley | Marine Corps | Private First Class | | | |
| Henry G. Lawrence Jr. | Marine Corps | Major | | | |
| Wilfred S. Le Francois | Marine Corps | Second Lieutenant | | | |
| John W. Leaper | Marine Corps | First Lieutenant | | | |
| Joseph G. LeBlanc | Marine Corps | Corporal | | | |
| Marcel LeHardy † | Navy | Lieutenant commander | Guadalcanal | November 12–13, 1942 | Awarded for actions during the Guadalcanal Campaign. Killed on 1 April 1943 while serving as communications officer on the USS San Francisco. |
| John W. Lee | Marine Corps | Sergeant | | | |
| Julius O. Lemcke | Marine Corps | Captain | | | |
| Dale M. Leslie | Marine Corps | Second Lieutenant | | | |
| Kenna M. Lester | Army | Staff Sergeant | Bougainville, Solomon Islands | December 18, 1943 | |
| Milton Lewis † | Marine Corps | Corporal | Tulagi, Solomon Islands | August 7, 1942 | Killed during the Battle of Tulagi while leading his squad against a Japanese machine gun position. The United States Navy destroyer escort USS Milton Lewis launched in 1944 but never completed, was named for him. |
| Wray C. Lewis | Marine Corps | First Lieutenant | | | |
| Ernest M. Lidenberg | Marine Corps | Private | | | |
| George Lilja | Marine Corps | Private First Class | | | |
| Carl J. Lindblad | Marine Corps | First Lieutenant | | | |
| Elwood Q. Lindsay | Marine Corps | Second Lieutenant | | | |
| Eugene E. Lindsey † | Navy | Lieutenant Commander | Battle of Midway | June 4, 1942 | "The President of the United States of America takes pride in presenting the Navy Cross (Posthumously) to Lieutenant Commander Eugene Elbert Lindsey (NSN: 0-61684), United States Navy, for extraordinary heroism in operations against the enemy while serving as Pilot of a carrier-based Navy Torpedo Plane and Squadron Commander of Torpedo Squadron SIX (VT-6), attached to the U.S.S. ENTERPRISE (CV-6), during the "Air Battle of Midway," against enemy Japanese forces on 4 June 1942. Participating in a vigorous and intensive assault against the Japanese invasion fleet, Lieutenant Commander Lindsey pressed home his attack with relentless determination in the face of a terrific barrage of anti-aircraft fire. The unprecedented conditions under which his squadron launched its offensive were so exceptional that it is highly improbably the occasion may ever recur where other pilots of the service will be called upon to demonstrate an equal degree of gallantry and fortitude. His extreme disregard of personal safety contributed materially to the success of our forces and his loyal conduct was in keeping with the highest traditions of the United States Naval Service. He gallantly gave his life for his country." |
| James T. Little | Marine Corps | Private First Class | | | |
| Harry B. Liversedge | Marine Corps | Colonel | New Georgia, Solomon Islands | July 5 – August 29, 1943 | First award: The Navy Cross is presented to Harry Bluett Liversedge, Colonel, U.S. Marine Corps, for extraordinary heroism as Commanding Officer of the First Marine Raider Regiment and the Third Battalions of the 145th and 148th Infantries, U.S. Army, during operations on New Georgia Island, British Solomon Islands, from July 5 to August 29, 1943. Gallantly leading his troops through dense jungle into combat against a fanatic enemy long experienced in jungle warfare and well-entrenched in strong positions, Colonel Liversedge commanded the assault with cool and courageous determination. Although handicapped by extremely adverse weather conditions, constant enemy fire and the difficult problems of supply, he skillfully coordinated his forces and those of cooperating units and, relentlessly forced the Japanese to withdraw. Colonel Liversedge's aggressive fighting spirit and brilliant leadership contributed immeasurably to the success of the New Georgia Campaign and were in keeping with the highest traditions of the United States Naval Service. |
| Harry B. Liversedge | Marine Corps | Colonel | Iwo Jima, Volcano Islands | February 19 – March 27, 1945 | Second award: The Navy Cross is presented to Harry Bluett Liversedge, Colonel, U.S. Marine Corps, for extraordinary heroism as Commanding Officer of the Twenty-Eighth Marines, Fifth Marine Division, in action against enemy Japanese forces on Iwo Jima, Volcano Islands, from 19 February to 27 March 1945. Landing on the fire-swept beaches twenty-two minutes after H-Hour, Colonel Liversedge gallantly led his men in the advance inland before executing a difficult turning maneuver to the south preparatory to launching the assault on Mount Suribachi. Under his inspiring leadership, his Regiment effected a partial seizure of a formidable Japanese position consisting of caves, pillboxes and blockhouses, until it was halted by intense enemy resistance which caused severe casualties. Braving the heavy hostile fire, he traversed the front lines to reorganize his troops and, by his determination and aggressiveness, enabled his men to overrun the Japanese position by nightfall. By his fighting spirit and intrepid leadership, Colonel Liversedge contributed materially to the capture of Mount Suribachi, and his unwavering devotion to duty throughout was in keeping with the highest traditions of the United States Naval Service. |
| Benjamin R. Livesey | Marine Corps | Sergeant | | | |
| Glen B. Loeffel | Marine Corps | Second Lieutenant | | | |
| Gregory K. Loesch | Marine Corps | First Lieutenant | | | |
| John R. Logan Jr. | Marine Corps | Corporal | | | |
| Michael Longazel | Marine Corps | Platoon Sergeant | | | |
| Harold L. Louth | Marine Corps | Private First Class | | | |
| John D. Lucas | Marine Corps | Second Lieutenant | | | |
| George T. Lumpkin | Marine Corps | Second Lieutenant | | | |
| George F. Lutchkus | Marine Corps | Sergeant | | | |
| Hubert C. Luther | Marine Corps | Corporal | | | |
| Robert C. Lyman | Marine Corps | Corporal | | | |
| Richard J. Lynes | Marine Corps | Corporal | | | |
| Dale C. Lyth | Marine Corps | Private First Class | | | |

== M ==
This along with the †, indicates that the Navy Cross was awarded posthumously

| Name | Service | Rank | Place of action | Date of action | Notes |
|---|---|---|---|---|---|
| Duncan C. MacMillan | Navy | Commander | East China Sea | December 27, 1943 – February 18, 1944 | First award |
| Duncan C. MacMillan | Navy | Commander | Luzon Strait | June 14, 1944 – July 27, 1944 | Second award, for the patrol of the U.S.S. Thresher |
| Eugene P. Madole | Marine Corps | Second Lieutenant | | | |
| Christopher L. Magee | Marine Corps | First Lieutenant | Solomon Islands | September 12 – October 22, 1943 | Shot down seven enemy planes during this period |
| Victor Maghakian | Marine Corps | Platoon Sergeant | Makin Atoll, Gilbert Islands | August 17–18, 1942 | |
| Martin E. Mahannah | Marine Corps | Second Lieutenant | | | |
| Thomas G. Mahoney | Marine Corps | First Lieutenant | | | |
| John B. Makstutis | Marine Corps | Sergeant | | | |
| Anthony P. Malanowski Jr. | Marine Corps | Platoon Sergeant | | | |
| Donald L. Mallory | Marine Corps | First Lieutenant | | | |
| Merle E. Manahan | Marine Corps | Private First Class | | | |
| Richard C. Mangrum | Marine Corps | Lieutenant Colonel | Guadalcanal, Solomon Islands | August 20 – September 15, 1942 | |
| Thomas H. Mann Jr. | Marine Corps | Second Lieutenant | | | |
| Robert L. Manning | Marine Corps | Gunner | | | |
| Gordon Maples | Marine Corps | Second Lieutenant | | | |
| Daniel J. Marini | Marine Corps | Sergeant | | | |
| James H. Marmande | Marine Corps | Second Lieutenant | | | |
| William P. Marontate | Marine Corps | First Lieutenant | | | |
| Ettore J. Marsolo | Marine Corps | Private First Class | | | |
| David W. Martin | Marine Corps | First Lieutenant | | | |
| Glenn E. Martin | Marine Corps | Captain | | | |
| Glen E. Marvin | Marine Corps | Sergeant | | | |
| Milton C. Marvin | Marine Corps | Second Lieutenant | | | |
| Leonard M. Mason | Marine Corps | Major | | | |
| John Lowery Mason | Navy | Lieutenant, Junior Grade | Battle off Cape Engaño, Philippines | October 25, 1944 | First award, Avenger pilot (VC-75) off USS San Jacinto |
| John Lowery Mason | Navy | Lieutenant Junior Grade | SW of Nagasaki; East China Sea | April 7, 1945 | Second award, Avenger pilot (VC-75) off USS San Jacinto; sinking of destroyer escort of IJN Yamato |
| Russell J. Massaro | Marine Corps | Private First Class | | | |
| James M. Masters Sr. | Marine Corps | Lieutenant Colonel | Okinawa, Ryukyu Islands | May 10–12, 1945 | |
| Thomas C. Mather | Marine Corps | Second Lieutenant | | | |
| Delbert D. Maupin | Marine Corps | Private | | | |
| Thomas J. Mayers | Marine Corps | Private First Class | | | |
| Harold R. Mazza | Navy | Commander | Pacific theater | Four Navy Crosses: March 10, 1942; May 8, 1942; April 7, 1945 (sinking of the Japanese battleship Yamato); July 28, 1945 | Only Naval Aviator to be awarded four Navy Crosses |
| James P. McAlarnis | Marine Corps | Platoon Sergeant | | | |
| John T. McAuliffe | Marine Corps | Corporal | | | |
| Joseph P. McCaffery | Marine Corps | Lieutenant Colonel | | | |
| David S. McCampbell | Navy | Commander | Luzon, Philippine Islands | October 25, 1944 | Also awarded Medal of Honor |
| Howard P. McCarstle Jr. | Marine Corps | Private First Class | | | |
| Francis P. McCarthy | Marine Corps | Captain | | | |
| William S. McCarver | Marine Corps | Private First Class | | | |
| Clyde H. McComas | Marine Corps | Sergeant | | | |
| Bobby G. McCracken | Marine Corps | Platoon Sergeant | | | |
| Charles E. McCune | Marine Corps | Private First Class | | | |
| Jacob H. McDaniel | Marine Corps | Corporal | | | |
| Stanley C. McDaniel | Marine Corps | Captain | | | |
| James S. McDermott | Marine Corps | Captain | | | |
| Harold M. McGaughey † | Navy Reserve | Lieutenant Commander | Puerto Princessa, Palawan Island, Philippines | January 29, 1945 | |
| Addies S. McGinn Jr. | Marine Corps | Gunnery Sergeant | | | |
| Edward W. McGloin | Marine Corps | Gunnery Sergeant | | | |
| James E. McGreevey | Marine Corps | Sergeant | | | |
| Kenneth R. McGuire | Marine Corps | Private First Class | | | |
| George W. McHenry | Marine Corps | Colonel | | | |
| Walter S. McIlhenny | Marine Corps | First Lieutenant | | | |
| Walter C. McKay | Marine Corps | Corporal | | | |
| William N. McKelvy Jr. | Marine Corps | Lieutenant Colonel | | | |
| Paul F. McLellan | Marine Corps | Captain | | | |
| Noyles McLennan | Marine Corps | Second Lieutenant | | | |
| Kenneth F. McLeod | Marine Corps | Lieutenant Colonel | | | |
| Maynard M. McLeod | Marine Corps | Second Lieutenant | | | |
| James J. McPoland | Marine Corps | First Lieutenant | | | |
| George H. Mead Jr. | Marine Corps | Second Lieutenant | | | |
| Dwayne E. Mears | Marine Corps | Captain | | | |
| Fenton J. Mee | Marine Corps | Captain | | | |
| Fenton J. Mee | Marine Corps | Major | | | |
| Edward Melnitsky | Marine Corps | Corporal | | | |
| Max E. Melville | Marine Corps | Private | | | |
| Petero Melzoni | Marine Corps | Private | | | |
| Charles E. Mentch | Marine Corps | Sergeant | | | |
| Herbert T. Merrill | Marine Corps | Captain | | | |
| Charlie D. Merritt | Marine Corps | Private First Class | | | |
| Albert W. Meyers | Marine Corps | Private First Class | | | |
| Wilfred V. Michaud | Marine Corps | Sergeant | | | |
| William J. Micklick | Marine Corps | Private First Class | | | |
| John W. Mielke | Marine Corps | Private | | | |
| Harold H. Millar Jr. | Marine Corps | First Lieutenant | | | |
| Frank J. Miller | Marine Corps | Second Lieutenant | | | |
| Doris Miller | Navy | Mess Attendant Second Class | Pearl Harbor | December 7, 1941 | As a mess attendant second class aboard the battleship USS West Virginia, Miller helped carry wounded sailors to safety during the attack on Pearl Harbor. He then manned an anti-aircraft gun and, despite no prior training in gunnery, officially shot down one plane (according to Navy Department records), but Miller and other eyewitnesses claimed a range of four to six. |
| Jack Miller | Marine Corps | First Lieutenant | | | |
| James D. Miller | Marine Corps | Platoon Sergeant | | | |
| Raymond Miller | Marine Corps | Private | | | |
| Vernon H. Miller | Marine Corps | First Lieutenant | | | |
| Charles L. Mills | Marine Corps | Captain | | | |
| James T. Mitchell | Marine Corps | Sergeant | Saipan. Marianna Islands | July 4-9, 1944 | The President of the United States of America takes pleasure in presenting the Navy Cross to Sergeant James T. Mitchell (MCSN: 254161), United States Marine Corps, for extraordinary heroism as a Squad Leader, serving with Company F, Second Battalion, Twenty-fourth Marines, FOURTH Marine Division, during operations against enemy Japanese forces on Saipan, Marianas Islands, from 15 June to 9 July 1944. Leading a small combat patrol into an enemy-infested wooded draw on 4 July, Sergeant Mitchell aided his men in the annihilation of seven of the enemy. Obtaining more Marines as resistance increased, he continued to push forward and, despite two saber wounds sustained during his action, succeeded in annihilating additional Japanese and in gaining valuable information as to the extent and strength of enemy positions. When his company had become dangerously pinned down by hostile enfilade rifle and machine-gun fire and had suffered ten casualties, six of whom were lying in an exposed position pleading for help on 9 July, he volunteered to lead a group of six Marines to administer first aid and evacuate the men to safety. Wounded in the leg while performing this act, he refused evacuation and, during the hazardous five hours that followed skillfully assisted in the almost insurmountable task of slowly transporting the casualties over a jagged coral on improvised litters to safety on high ground to the rear. Again refusing treatment or evacuation until his comrades had been taken to the aid station, he was instrumental in saving at least six lives, and served as an inspiration to the men of his company. Sergeant Mitchell's courage, initiative and devotion to duty throughout this period of grave peril enhanced and upheld the highest traditions of the United States Naval Service. |
| John W. Mitchell | Army Air Forces | Major | Solomon Islands | April 18, 1943 | |
| Marc Mitscher | Navy | Vice Admiral | Range of actions around, and in, Battle of Leyte Gulf | October 22–30, 1944 | Second award, Commander of successful Fast Carrier Task Force operating as TF 38 (first was for May 1919 attempt at first Transatlantic flight) |
| Marc Mitscher | Navy | Vice Admiral | Range of actions around, and in, the Battle of Iwo Jima and Battle of Okinawa | January 27 – May 27, 1945 | Third award, Commander of successful Fast Carrier Task Force operating as TF 58 |
| Charles Momsen | Navy | Captain | East China Sea | February 1943 – June 1944 | Devising "a doctrine of attack" and commanding the US Navy's first Coordinated Attack Group of submarines |
| Charles R. Monarch | Marine Corps | Sergeant | | | |
| Charles J. Monges | Marine Corps | Sergeant | | | |
| Elmer F. Montgomery | Marine Corps | Sergeant | | | |
| Paul Moore Jr. | Marine Corps | Second Lieutenant | | | |
| Ralph E. Moore Jr. | Marine Corps | Corporal | | | |
| Thomas F. Moore Jr. | Marine Corps | Second Lieutenant | | | |
| William E. Moore Jr. | Marine Corps | Captain | | | |
| Rivers J. Morrell | Marine Corps | Major | | | |
| Emmett R. Morris | Marine Corps | Private First Class | | | |
| Joshua Morris | Marine Corps | Private First Class | | | |
| Richard E. Morrow | Marine Corps | Corporal | | | |
| Ralph C. Morse Jr. | Marine Corps | Captain | | | |
| Gilbert L. Morton | Marine Corps | Sergeant Major | | | |
| Earl J. Mowery | Marine Corps | Sergeant | | | |
| Bernhardt L. Mueller | Marine Corps | Corporal | | | |
| Jesse E. Murphree | Marine Corps | Sergeant | | | |
| Francis J. Murphy | Marine Corps | Chief Warrant Officer | | | |
| John J. Murphy Jr. | Marine Corps | Private First Class | | | |
| Michael F. Murray Jr. | Marine Corps | Platoon Sergeant | | | |
| Raymond L. Murray | Marine Corps | Lieutenant Colonel | Saipan, Marianas Islands | June 15, 1944 | First award (second was in Korean War) |
| Thomas Oliver Murray | Naval Reserve | Lieutenant Commander | Philippine Island | October 25, 1944 | US Navy air combat pilot and CO of air squadron VC-21, scored a close-range direct torpedo hit on enemy cruiser, leaving it dead in the water in the Battle off Samar. |
| Hollis U. Mustain | Marine Corps | Lieutenant Colonel | | | |
| Edward Myers | Marine Corps | Sergeant | | | |
| Thomas J. Myers | Marine Corps | Major | | | |

== N ==
This along with the †, indicates that the Navy Cross was awarded posthumously

| Name | Service | Rank | Place of action | Date of action | Notes |
|---|---|---|---|---|---|
| John J. Nagazyna | Marine Corps | Sergeant Major | | | |
| Joseph L. Narr | Marine Corps | Second Lieutenant | | | |
| Horace A. Narveson | Marine Corps | Private First Class | | | |
| James L. Neefus | Marine Corps | Captain | | | |
| Robert M. Neiman | Marine Corps | Major | | | |
| Edward C. Nelson Jr. | Marine Corps | First Lieutenant | | | |
| Harold E. Nelson | Marine Corps | Captain | | | |
| James J. Nelson | Marine Corps | Private First Class | | | |
| Quinten G. Nelson | Marine Corps | Private First Class | | | |
| Louis C. Nero | Marine Corps | Sergeant | | | |
| Gerard B. Nevle | Marine Corps | Private First Class | | | |
| Joseph E. Newman | Marine Corps | Private First Class | | | |
| Clarence T. Nicholas | Marine Corps | Corporal | | | |
| Ralph H. Niehaus | Marine Corps | Second Lieutenant | | | |
| Winfield R. Nisbet Jr. | Marine Corps | Corporal | | | |
| John R. Norman | Marine Corps | First Lieutenant | | | |
| Benjamin W. Norris | Marine Corps | Major | | | |
| John Nosarzewski | Marine Corps | Private First Class | | | |
| Stephen Nowak | Marine Corps | Private First Class | | | |
| Joseph E. Nugent | Marine Corps | Private First Class | Peleliu, Palau Islands | 22 September 1944 | In same company (A/1/7) as fellow Navy Cross recipient Sergeant Vincent Jendeski CITATION The President of the United States of America takes pride in presenting the Navy Cross (Posthumously) to Private First Class Joseph E. Nugent (MCSN: 326465), United States Marine Corps, for extraordinary heroism and devotion to duty while serving as a Member of a Machine Gun Section serving with Company A, First Battalion, Seventh Marines, FIRST Marine Division, in action against enemy Japanese forces on Peleliu, Palau Islands, 17 and 22 September 1944. When his platoon became separated from the remainder of the company during an enemy counterattack, Private First Class Nugent unhesitatingly volunteered to return to the company and obtain additional troops and, courageously making his way through hostile territory to the command post, led the reinforcements back to the platoon, thereby contributing to the reestablishment of contact with the company and the successful repulsion of the Japanese forces. With his section ordered to place immediate fire on the enemy to facilitate the withdrawal of a company on 22 September, he established his gun in the most exposed position in the vicinity, skillfully directing intense, accurate fire against the Japanese, and, although mortally wounded during this action, steadfastly remained at his post and continued firing until the withdrawal was completed and he was evacuated. By his splendid initiative and indomitable fighting spirit in the face of grave peril, Private First Class Nugent saved the lives of many of his comrades, and his self-sacrificing devotion to duty was in keeping with the highest traditions of the United States Naval Service. He gallantly gave his life for his country. |

== O ==
This along with the †, indicates that the Navy Cross was awarded posthumously

| Name | Service | Rank | Place of action | Date of action | Notes |
|---|---|---|---|---|---|
| Wilcie A. O'Bannon | Marine Corps | First Lieutenant | | | |
| Martin J. O'Brien | Marine Corps | Second Lieutenant | | | |
| Edward O'Hare † | Navy | Lieutenant Commander | Airspace of Tarawa Atoll | November 26, 1943 | When the overwhelmed Japanese had taken to launching nighttime air attacks against USN vessels, O'Hare helped develop, and then led, the USN's first-ever nighttime fighter attack launched from an aircraft carrier. Previously won Medal of Honor for February 1942 Action off Bougainville |
| Jeremiah J. O'Keefe | Marine Corps | First Lieutenant | | | |
| Richard N. Olbert | Marine Corps | Private First Class | | | |
| Jesse B. Oldendorf | Navy | Rear Admiral | Battle of Surigao Strait | October 24–25, 1944 | Planning and leadership as Commander of Task Group 77.2, which defeated the Japanese Southern Force |
| Bruno Oribiletti | Marine Corps | Private First Class | | | |
| George E. Orme | Marine Corps | Private First Class | | | |
| Peter J. Ortiz | Marine Corps | Major | France | January 8 – May 20, 1944 | First award |
| Peter J. Ortiz | Marine Corps | Major | France | August 1, 1944 – April 27, 1945 | Second award, POW |
| Robert M. Ortiz | Marine Corps | Private First Class | | | |
| Stanley E. Osborn | Marine Corps | Second Lieutenant | | | |
| Robert J. Oswald Jr. | Marine Corps | Sergeant | | | |
| Robert G. Owens Jr. | Marine Corps | Major | | | |

== P ==
This along with the †, indicates that the Navy Cross was awarded posthumously

| Name | Service | Rank | Place of action | Date of action | Notes |
|---|---|---|---|---|---|
| Frank L. Palmer | Marine Corps | Private | | | |
| Osbaldo R. Paredes | Marine Corps | Corporal | | | |
| Edward N. Parker | Navy | Lieutenant Commander | Battle of Balikpapan | January 24–25, 1942 | First award |
| Edward N. Parker | Navy | Lieutenant Commander | Battle of Badung Strait | February 19–20, 1942 | Second award |
| Edward N. Parker | Navy | Lieutenant Commander | Naval Battle of Guadalcanal | November 12–13, 1942 | Third award |
| Raymond D. Parker | Marine Corps | Private | | | |
| Walter G. Parker | Marine Corps | Corporal | | | |
| Floyd B. Parks † | Marine Corps | Major | Battle of Midway | June 4, 1942 | First award |
| Verrill G. Parks | Marine Corps | Corporal | | | |
| Robert L. Parrot | Marine Corps | Corporal | | | |
| Chester Pauley Jr. | Marine Corps | Private | | | |
| Jim J. Paulos | Marine Corps | Second Lieutenant | | | |
| Frederick R. Payne Jr. | Marine Corps | Major | | | |
| Harry P. Pearce | Marine Corps | Second Lieutenant | | | |
| Oscar F. Peatross | Marine Corps | Captain | Makin Atoll, Gilbert Islands | August 17–18, 1942 | |
| Edward S. Pennell | Marine Corps | Second Lieutenant | | | |
| Fred B. Penninger | Marine Corps | Sergeant | | | |
| Paul G. Pennoyer | Navy | Lieutenant | Battle of the Philippine Sea | 20 June 1944 | |
| George A. Percy | Marine Corps | Major | Battle of Iwo Jima | February 21–March 16, 1945 | |
| Gilbert Percy | Marine Corps | First Lieutenant | | | |
| Howard E. Perrault | Marine Corps | Corporal | | | |
| John W. Perry | Marine Corps | Corporal | | | |
| Dale L. Peters | Marine Corps | Corporal | | | |
| Clarence E. Petrie | Marine Corps | Sergeant | | | |
| Francis C. Pettus | Marine Corps | Platoon Sergeant | | | |
| Orville E. Pfannkuch | Marine Corps | Corporal | | | |
| William L. Piaseczny | Marine Corps | Private First Class | | | |
| William Pinckney | Navy | Cook | Battle of the Santa Cruz Islands | October 26, 1942 | |
| Francis E. Pierce Jr. | Marine Corps | Captain | | | |
| Harold G. Pierce | Marine Corps | Sergeant | | | |
| Warren H. Pierce † | Marine Corps | Sergeant | Battle of Iwo Jima | February 19, 1945 | |
| David W. Pinkerton Jr. | Marine Corps | Second Lieutenant | | | |
| Alphons A. Pinter | Marine Corps | Sergeant | | | |
| Merwyn C. Plumley | Marine Corps | Captain | | | |
| Casimir R. Polakowski | Marine Corps | Platoon Sergeant | | | |
| Harold E. Polk | Marine Corps | Private | | | |
| Daniel C. Pollock | Marine Corps | Lieutenant Colonel | | | |
| Edwin A. Pollock | Marine Corps | Lieutenant Colonel | Guadalcanal, Solomon Islands | August 20–21, 1942 | |
| Zenneth A. Pond | Marine Corps | Second Lieutenant | | | |
| Charles J. Pottersnak | Marine Corps | Private First Class | | | |
| David M. Pottorff | Marine Corps | First Lieutenant | | | |
| Andrew V. Poulin | Marine Corps | Corporal | | | |
| Henry T. Pound | Marine Corps | Private | | | |
| Ernest A. Powell | Marine Corps | Captain | | | |
| Robert F. Powell | Marine Corps | Corporal | | | |
| James J. Powers | Marine Corps | Sergeant | | | |
| Robert A. Powers | Marine Corps | Corporal | | | |
| James F. Prendergast | Marine Corps | Second Lieutenant | | | |
| Frank H. Presley | Marine Corps | First Lieutenant | | | |
| Benjamin S. Preston Jr. | Marine Corps | First Lieutenant | | | |
| Benjamin F. Pritchett Jr. | Marine Corps | Private | | | |
| Gilbert G. Prosek | Marine Corps | Private First Class | | | |
| Bruce Prosser | Marine Corps | Captain | | | |
| Lewis B. Puller | Marine Corps | Lieutenant Colonel | Guadalcanal, Solomon Islands | October 24–25, 1942 | Third award (first two were in Occupation of Nicaragua) |
| Lewis B. Puller | Marine Corps | Lieutenant Colonel | Cape Gloucester, New Britain | December 26, 1943 – January 19, 1944 | Fourth award |
| Paul A. Putnam | Marine Corps | Major | | | |

== Q ==
This along with the †, indicates that the Navy Cross was awarded posthumously

| Name | Service | Rank | Place of action | Date of action | Notes |
|---|---|---|---|---|---|
| John Quattrone | Marine Corps | Gunnery Sergeant | | | |
| Martin J. Queeney † | Marine Corps | Sergeant | Iwo Jima | March 8, 1945 | |
| Brian J. Quirk | Marine Corps | Corporal | | | |

== R ==
This along with the †, indicates that the Navy Cross was awarded posthumously

| Name | Service | Rank | Place of action | Date of action | Notes |
|---|---|---|---|---|---|
| Bernard S. Radomski | Marine Corps | Corporal | | | |
| Maurice A. Ragland | Marine Corps | Private First Class | | | |
| John E. Rairigh | Army Air Forces | First Lieutenant | Sea of Japan | July 30, 1945 | |
| Orvin H. Ramlo | Marine Corps | Second Lieutenant | | | |
| Haakon B. Rasmussen | Marine Corps | Second Lieutenant | | | |
| Leland Rawls | Navy | | Battle of Leyte, Pacific | Oct 25, 1944 | |
| James R. Ray | Marine Corps | First Lieutenant | | | |
| Robert D. Raysbrook | Marine Corps | Sergeant | | | |
| Amedeo Rea | Marine Corps | Major | | | |
| William F. Reckus | Marine Corps | First Lieutenant | | | |
| Robert S. Reed | Marine Corps | Private | | James R. Reid Jr. | Navy GM3C |
| Donald A. Remington | Marine Corps | Corporal | | | |
| Joseph N. Renner | Marine Corps | Major | | | |
| Kenneth L. Reusser | Marine Corps | Captain | Okinawa, Ryukyu Islands | May 10, 1945 | First award (second was in Korean War) |
| Harold P. Reynolds | Marine Corps | Private First Class | | | |
| Terrence J. Reynolds Jr. | Marine Corps | Corporal | | | |
| Gerald M. Rich | Marine Corps | Corporal | | | |
| Harold E. Richardson | Marine Corps | Private | | | |
| Obert C. Richardson | Marine Corps | First Lieutenant | | | |
| William F. Richey | Marine Corps | Private | | | |
| Walter J. Ridlon Jr. | Marine Corps | Captain | | | |
| James E. Riegel | Marine Corps | Private | | | |
| Francis D. Rineer | Marine Corps | First Lieutenant | | | |
| Allan H. Ringblom | Marine Corps | Second Lieutenant | | | |
| Charles F. Ringgold | Marine Corps | Private First Class | | | |
| William B. Rippee | Marine Corps | First Lieutenant | | | |
| John Rivers | Marine Corps | Private | | | |
| William G. Robb | Marine Corps | Lieutenant Colonel | | | |
| Franklin C. Robbins | Marine Corps | Corporal | | | |
| Donald R. A. Roberton | Marine Corps | Private | | | |
| Francis E. Roberts | Marine Corps | Private First Class | | | |
| Harold C. Roberts | Marine Corps | Colonel | | | |
| Donn J. Robertson | Marine Corps | Lieutenant Colonel | Iwo Jima, Volcano Islands | February 19 – March 23, 1945 | |
| Lawrence D. Rogers | Marine Corps | Private First Class | | | |
| Neil L. Rogers | Marine Corps | Private First Class | | | |
| Raymond D. Rogers | Marine Corps | Private First Class | | | |
| Claude G. Rollen | Marine Corps | Captain | | | |
| Jesse D. Rollow Jr. | Marine Corps | Second Lieutenant | | | |
| James Roosevelt | Marine Corps | Major | | | |
| Maier J. Rothschild | Marine Corps | Corporal | | | |
| Benjamin C. Rountree | Marine Corps | Private First Class | | | |
| Edward Ruess | Marine Corps | First Lieutenant | | | |
| John W. Ruhsam | Marine Corps | Second Lieutenant | | | |
| Edward J. Ruiz | Marine Corps | Corporal | | | |
| William H. Rupertus | Marine Corps | Brigadier General | Solomon Islands | August 7–9, 1942 | |
| Jesse Rutherford Jr. | Marine Corps | Private | | | |
| Alvin O. Rutledge | Marine Corps | Private | | | |
| James S. Ryan | Marine Corps | Corporal | | | The President of the United States of America takes pride in presenting the Navy Cross (Posthumously) to Corporal James S. Ryan (MCSN: 820401), United States Marine Corps, for extraordinary heroism and devotion to duty while serving as a Demolitions Group Leader of Company I, Third Battalion, Twenty-Eighth Marines, FIFTH Marine Division, during action on enemy Japanese-held Iwo Jima, Volcano Islands, 20 February 1945. When two attacking companies were held up by heavy machine-gun and rifle fire from six supporting pillboxes at the base of Mount Suribachi, Corporal Ryan placed his demolitions group to deliver covering fire and, acting on his own initiative, went forward alone in the midst of heavy hostile cross-fire to the enemy positions. Placing and igniting the demolition charges, he went from pillbox to pillbox, throwing explosive charges inside and entering the fortifications after each explosion to kill the remaining Japanese in hand-to-hand combat. In this matter, he completely destroyed five pillboxes and annihilated all occupants. He remained exposed to Japanese fire, reconnoitering a route to the sixth, until he fell, mortally wounded by an enemy mortar shell. By his daring initiative and fearless devotion to duty, Corporal Ryan enabled the two assault companies to continue their advance and thereby contributed materially to the capture of Mount Suribachi. His courageous conduct was in keeping with the highest traditions of the United States Naval Service. He gallantly gave his life for his country. |
| Michael P. Ryan | Marine Corps | Major | | | |

== S ==
This along with the †, indicates that the Navy Cross was awarded posthumously

| Name | Service | Rank | Place of action | Date of action | Notes |
|---|---|---|---|---|---|
| John A. Sabini | Marine Corps | First Lieutenant | | | |
| Joseph Sailer Jr. | Marine Corps | Major | | | |
| Edward E. Salzman | Marine Corps | Sergeant | | | |
| William H. Sanders II | Marine Corps | First Lieutenant | | | |
| Gordon T. Sandison | Marine Corps | First Lieutenant | | | |
| William B. Sandoval | Marine Corps | Second Lieutenant | | | |
| Charles S. Sands | Marine Corps | Captain | | | |
| James E. Sands | Marine Corps | Private | | | |
| Donald J. Sandy | Marine Corps | Private | | | |
| Silvio Sanguedolce | Marine Corps | Sergeant | | | |
| LaVerne G. Saunders | Army Air Forces | Brigadier General | Solomon Islands | November 18, 1942 | |
| Merritt M. Savage | Marine Corps | Sergeant | | | |
| Irving Schechter | Marine Corps | Captain | | | |
| Cedric J. Scheidleman | Marine Corps | First Lieutenant | | | |
| Harold G. Schlendering | Marine Corps | First Lieutenant | | | |
| Albert A. Schmid | Marine Corps | Private | Guadalcanal, Solomon Islands | August 21, 1942 | |
| Donald E. Schmille | Marine Corps | Private First Class | | | |
| Merlin F. Schneider | Marine Corps | Colonel | Guam, Marianas Islands | July 21 – August 10, 1944 | |
| Robert G. Schneider | Marine Corps | Private | | | |
| Harold G. Schrier | Marine Corps | First Lieutenant | Iwo Jima, Volcano Islands | February 23, 1945 | Led a patrol and captured Mount Suribachi and raised the American flag |
| Joseph O. Schulte | Marine Corps | First Lieutenant | | | |
| Conrad A. Schultz | Marine Corps | Private First Class | | | |
| Thomas A. Schultz | Marine Corps | First Lieutenant | | | |
| William E. Schwerin | Marine Corps | Captain | | | |
| James B. Seaman | Marine Corps | First Lieutenant | | | |
| Joseph Sebock | Marine Corps | Private First Class | | | |
| Langdon R. Secrest | Marine Corps | Corporal | | | |
| William Bernard Sieglaff | Navy | Lieutenant Commander | Pacific War Area | December 15, 1942 - April 19, 1943 | First Award |
| William Bernard Sieglaff | Navy | Commander | Pacific War Area | March 5-25, 1944 | Second Award |
| William F. Seiverling Jr. | Marine Corps | Private | | | |
| Robert B. Selby | Marine Corps | Private First Class | | | |
| Howard D. Self | Marine Corps | Gunnery Sergeant | | | |
| Jack L. Selk | Marine Corps | Private First Class | | | |
| Mike E. Sergo | Marine Corps | Private First Class | | | |
| Joseph T. Sganga | Marine Corps | Corporal | | | |
| Walter F. Shaffner | Marine Corps | First Lieutenant | | | |
| Albert J. Shaheen | Marine Corps | Sergeant | | | |
| Conrad F. Shaker | Marine Corps | Corporal | | | |
| Lawton E. Shank † | Civilian | Doctor | Battle of Wake Island | December 9, 1941 | Only civilian to ever be awarded the Navy Cross: "during an intensive bombing and strafing attack in ... which the hospital was completely destroyed and several persons therein killed ... remained at his post and supervised the evacuation of the patients and equipment ... was thus enabled to save those still living and to establish a new hospital in an empty magazine." |
| James V. Shanley | Marine Corps | Captain | | | |
| James V. Shanley | Marine Corps | Captain | | | |
| William L. Shannon | Marine Corps | Second Lieutenant | | | |
| Alan Shapley | Marine Corps | Lieutenant Colonel | Guam, Marianas Islands | July 21 – August 10, 1944 | |
| Joseph W. Shawn | Marine Corps | Platoon Sergeant | | | |
| Charles M. Sheehan | Marine Corps | Private | | | |
| Joseph D. Sheehan | Marine Corps | Sergeant | | | |
| Robert G. Sheipe | Marine Corps | Corporal | | | |
| Charles W. Shelburne | Marine Corps | Lieutenant Colonel | | | |
| Charles M. Shepperd | Marine Corps | Private First Class | | | |
| Allen E. Shively | Marine Corps | Sergeant | | | |
| William G. Shoemaker | Marine Corps | First Lieutenant | | | |
| William G. Shoemaker | Marine Corps | Captain | | | |
| Charles R. Shootman | Marine Corps | Private | | | |
| Charles W. Shriver | Marine Corps | Private | | | |
| Frank E. Shumann Jr. | Marine Corps | Private First Class | | | |
| Nicholas Sileo | Marine Corps | Private First Class | | | |
| James T. Simmers | Marine Corps | Corporal | | | |
| Wesley P. Simmonds | Marine Corps | Private First Class | | | |
| Clyde A. Simmons | Marine Corps | Corporal | | | |
| Harvey L. Simonson | Marine Corps | Private First Class | | | |
| Carter B. Simpson | Marine Corps | First Lieutenant | | | |
| Robert E. Simpson | Marine Corps | Sergeant | | | |
| Robert M. Singleton | Marine Corps | Corporal | | | |
| James L. Sizemore | Marine Corps | First Lieutenant | | | |
| John W. Slagle | Marine Corps | Platoon Sergeant | | | |
| Orvan S. Slaughter | Marine Corps | First Sergeant | | | |
| LeRoy M. Sleeper | Marine Corps | Private | | | |
| John H. Slusser | Marine Corps | Captain | | | |
| George H. Smallwood | Marine Corps | Sergeant | Iwo Jima, Volcano Islands | March 6th 1945 | After his company had been halted by a hostile emplacement containing snipers, machine guns and knee mortars and which was covered with mutually supporting fire from another enemy position, Sergeant Smallwood courageously moved forward armed with grenades to neutralize the position. Running out of grenades and ammunition before completing his mission, he returned to his own lines and, after obtaining a fresh supply, again made his way forward to resume his hazardous mission and succeeded in eliminating the hostile strong point before he was wounded. By his valiant action, Sergeant Smallwood enabled his company to continue the advance and eventually occupy the position so fiercely defended by the Japanese. |
| Alex B. Smith | Marine Corps | Corporal | | | |
| Edward L. Smith Jr. | Marine Corps | Private | | | |
| George O. Smith | Marine Corps | Private First Class | | | |
| Howard E. Smith | Marine Corps | Private First Class | | | |
| Ivan T. Smith | Marine Corps | Sergeant | | | |
| James T. Smith | Marine Corps | Private First Class | | | |
| John J. Smith | Marine Corps | Second Lieutenant | | | |
| Roger E. Smith | Marine Corps | First Lieutenant | | | |
| Edward W. Snedeker | Marine Corps | Colonel | Okinawa, Ryukyu Islands | June 2–22, 1945 | |
| Bronislow A. Snieckus | Marine Corps | Private First Class | | | |
| Thomas J. Snyder | Marine Corps | Corporal | | | |
| John A. Spazzafero | Marine Corps | Corporal | | | |
| Lyle E. Specht | Marine Corps | Captain | | | |
| John J. Spillane | Marine Corps | Corporal | | | |
| Melvin J. Spotts | Marine Corps | Second Lieutenant | | | |
| Clifton Sprague | Navy | Rear Admiral | Battle off Samar | October 25, 1944 | Leadership of escort carrier Task Unit 77.4.3 against the vastly superior IJN Center Force, preventing it from attacking the allied invasion ships involved in the Battle of Leyte |
| Raymond A. Spruance | Navy | Admiral | Iwo Jima campaign, Okinawa campaign | January – May 1945 | Heroism and service as Commander of United States Fifth Fleet, including preparations for and capture of Iwo Jima, Okinawa and other positions in the Ryukyu Islands |
| Clement J. Stadler | Marine Corps | Captain | | | |
| Jack R. Stambaugh | Marine Corps | Private | | | |
| Clyde H. Stamps | Marine Corps | Technical Sergeant | | | |
| Norman R. Stanford | Marine Corps | First Lieutenant | | | |
| Henry W. Stankus | Marine Corps | First Lieutenant | | | |
| Donald H. Stapp | Marine Corps | Major | | | |
| Anthony J. Stea | Marine Corps | Private First Class | | | |
| David S. Stear | Navy | Lieutenant (Junior Grade) | Battle of the Philippine Sea | 20 June 1944 | Attack on Japanese aircraft carrier Hiyō |
| Harlan S. Steffen | Marine Corps | Corporal | | | |
| Donald B. Steinaker | Marine Corps | Private First Class | | | |
| James L. Stephenson | Marine Corps | Corporal | | | |
| Barney Sterling | Marine Corps | Private First Class | | | |
| Robert E. Stevenson | Marine Corps | First Lieutenant | | | |
| William D. Stevenson | Marine Corps | Captain | | | |
| Frederic A. Stott | Marine Corps | First Lieutenant | | | |
| Robert F. Stout | Marine Corps | First Lieutenant | | | |
| James A. Stranahan Jr. | Marine Corps | First Lieutenant | | | |
| Stanley A. Strantz | Marine Corps | Sergeant | | | |
| Bernard M. Strean | Navy | Vice Admiral | Battle of the Philippine Sea | | |
| George L. Street III | Navy | Lieutenant Commander | East China Sea | May 20 – July 19, 1945 | For leadership and heroism as Commanding Officer (CO) of USS Tirante (SS-420)'s second war patrol. Also awarded Medal of Honor for an action as CO on Tirante's first war patrol, for which XO Edward L. Beach Jr. received the Navy Cross, and the entire crew received a Presidential Unit Citation. |
| Edmund J. Stulce | Navy | Lieutenant, Junior Grade | Kure Harbor, Japan | July 24, 1945 | |
| Jack Sugarman | Marine Corps | Private First Class | | | |
| Richard E. Sullivan | Marine Corps | Second Lieutenant | | | |
| Walter W. Swanberger | Marine Corps | Second Lieutenant | | | |
| John B. Sweeney | Marine Corps | Captain | | | |
| William H. Swisher | Marine Corps | First Lieutenant | | | |

== T ==
This along with the †, indicates that the Navy Cross was awarded posthumously

| Name | Service | Rank | Place of action | Date of action | Notes |
|---|---|---|---|---|---|
| Oral L. Tankersley | Marine Corps | Private | | | |
| Karl Tanner | Marine Corps | First Lieutenant | | | |
| Clifton E. Taylor | Marine Corps | Platoon Sergeant | | | |
| Harold K. Taylor | Marine Corps | Second Lieutenant | | | |
| James E. Taylor Jr. | Marine Corps | First Lieutenant | | | |
| Morris L. Terry | Marine Corps | Platoon Sergeant | | | |
| Joseph A. Terzi | Marine Corps | Captain | | | |
| J. D. Thaxton | Marine Corps | Private First Class | | | |
| Dennis F. Thomas | Marine Corps | Private First Class | | | |
| Ernest I. Thomas | Marine Corps | Platoon Sergeant | | | |
| Franklin C. Thomas Jr. | Marine Corps | Captain | | | |
| Harold C. Thomas | Navy | Lieutenant (junior grade) | Cape Esperance, Guadalcanal | October 11–12, 1942 | Killed during the Battle of Cape Esperance while working with damage control parties to keep the USS Boise in the battle |
| Wilbur J. Thomas | Marine Corps | First Lieutenant | | | |
| John A. Thompson | Army Air Forces | Captain | Guadalcanal, Solomon Islands | August 27 – September 25, 1942 | |
| Woodrow R. Thompson † | Marine Corps | Sergeant | Guadalcanal, Solomon Islands | October 9, 1942 | Killed in action at the Matanikau River. The United States Navy destroyer escort USS Woodrow R. Thompson (DE-451) was named for him but construction was cancelled in 1944. The destroyer USS Woodrow R. Thompson (DD-721) then was named in honor of Thompson. Launched in 1946 its construction was also cancelled and was sold for scrap in 1955. |
| Thorborn M. Thostenson | Marine Corps | Sergeant | | | |
| Leo A. Ticconi | Marine Corps | Private First Class | | | |
| Max E. Timmons | Marine Corps | Private First Class | | | |
| Calvin Tipton | Marine Corps | Private | | | |
| James W. Tobey | Marine Corps | Private | | | |
| Robert C. Toler | Marine Corps | Sergeant | | | |
| Cecil R. Tolley | Marine Corps | Private | | | |
| Mark Tomlinson | Marine Corps | Second Lieutenant | | | |
| Rathvon M. Tompkins | Marine Corps | Lieutenant Colonel | Saipan, Marianas Islands | June 17, 1944 | |
| Paul T. Torian | Marine Corps | Captain | | | |
| Harry Towne | Marine Corps | Corporal | | | |
| Warren H. Tracey | Marine Corps | Gunnery Sergeant | | | |
| Louis W. Trafton | Marine Corps | Private | | | |
| Eugene A. Trowbridge | Marine Corps | Second Lieutenant | | | |
| Frank A. Tucker | Marine Corps | Sergeant | | | |
| Allen H. Turnage | Marine Corps | Major General | Bougainville, Solomon Islands | November 1–27, 1943 | |
| Robert B. Turnbull | Marine Corps | Captain | | | |
| Albert W. Tweedy Jr. | Marine Corps | Second Lieutenant | | | |
| Marshall A. Tyler | Marine Corps | Major | | | |

== U ==
This along with the †, indicates that the Navy Cross was awarded posthumously

| Name | Service | Rank | Place of action | Date of action | Notes |
|---|---|---|---|---|---|
| William T. Unger | Marine Corps | Platoon Sergeant | | | |

== V ==
This along with the †, indicates that the Navy Cross was awarded posthumously

| Name | Service | Rank | Place of action | Date of action | Notes |
|---|---|---|---|---|---|
| Ralph W. Vahle | Marine Corps | Corporal | | | |
| Herbert J. Valentine | Marine Corps | Captain | off Okinawa, Ryukyu Islands | May 25, 1945 | Shot down five enemy planes and probably down a sixth in a single action |
| William H. Van Beest | Marine Corps | First Lieutenant | | | |
| John J. Van Buren † | Navy | Lieutenant (j.g.) | Midway | June 4, 1942 | Douglas SBD Dauntless dive bomber pilot with operating from the aircraft carrier USS Enterprise his aircraft disappeared after attacking Japanese ships during the Battle of Midway. The U.S. Navy destroyer escort USS John J. Van Buren (DE-753), launched in 1944 but never completed was named after him. |
| George Van Daele | Marine Corps | Private First Class | | | |
| George O. Van Orden | Marine Corps | Lieutenant Colonel | Bougainville, Solomon Islands | November 1, 1943 | |
| Eugene S. Vance | Marine Corps | Private First Class | | | |
| Alexander A. Vandegrift | Marine Corps | Major General | Battle of Tulagi and Gavutu–Tanambogo | August 7, 1942 | Commander of 1st Marine Division and its successful landings on multiple islands on first day of the Guadalcanal campaign. Later awarded the Medal of Honor, for Guadalcanal campaign actions throughout August 7 to December 9, 1942. |
| William H. Vandyke | Marine Corps | Platoon Sergeant | | | |
| Salvador Vargas | Marine Corps | Private | | | |
| Orville O. Vaught | Marine Corps | Corporal | | | |
| Robert W. Vaupell | Marine Corps | First Lieutenant | Midway | June 4–5, 1942 | First award |
| Robert W. Vaupell | Marine Corps | First Lieutenant | Solomon Islands | August 30 – October 8, 1942 | Second award |
| George T. Veneri | Marine Corps | Private First Class | | | |
| Albert M. Villa | Marine Corps | Sergeant | | | |
| James K. Vincent | Marine Corps | Private First Class | | | |
| Hugh A. Vogel | Marine Corps | Corporal | | | |
| Albert O. Vorse Jr. | Navy | Lieutenant Commander | Formosa | February 1, 1944 | Commanding officer of the USS Ticonderoga Air Group, himself piloting a F6F-5 Hellcat of VF-80, led a contingent of 21 fighters and bombers against shipping off Formosa, in which he persevered through bad weather and heavy enemy anti-aircraft fire to deliver a direct hit on a destroyer from 200 feet (61 m) |
| Clair H. Voss | Marine Corps | Second Lieutenant | | | |

== W ==
This along with the †, indicates that the Navy Cross was awarded posthumously

| Name | Service | Rank | Place of action | Date of action | Notes |
|---|---|---|---|---|---|
| Robert Wade | Marine Corps | Second Lieutenant | | | |
| Gordon K. Walker | Marine Corps | Private | | | |
| Paige D. Walker | Marine Corps | Generalissimo | | | |
| John T. Walker | Marine Corps | Colonel | Eniwetok Atoll, Marshall Islands | February 18 & 22, 1944 | |
| Fred M. Wallace | Marine Corps | First Lieutenant | | | |
| Edward J. Wallof | Marine Corps | First Lieutenant | | | |
| Quentin R. Walsh | Coast Guard | Lieutenant Commander | Cherbourg, France | June 26–27, 1944 | |
| Lewis W. Walt | Marine Corps | Lieutenant Colonel | Cape Gloucester, New Britain | January 10, 1944 | First award |
| Lewis W. Walt | Marine Corps | Lieutenant Colonel | Peleliu, Palau Islands | September 15–30, 1944 | Second award |
| Merritt C. Walton | Marine Corps | Platoon Sergeant | | | |
| John J. Wantuck | Marine Corps | Private | | | |
| Maurice A. Ward | Marine Corps | Second Lieutenant | | | |
| Frederick B. Warder | Navy | Lieutenant Commander | Waters of Java | February 25 – April 1, 1942 | First award, for the fourth patrol of USS Seawolf (SS-197) |
| Frederick B. Warder | Navy | Lieutenant Commander | Waters of Davao Gulf | October 7 – December 1, 1942 | Second award, for the seventh patrol of USS Seawolf (SS-197) |
| Arthur T. Warner | Marine Corps | Captain | | | |
| Gordon Warner | Marine Corps | Captain | | | |
| Forest B. Warren | Marine Corps | First Lieutenant | | | |
| John E. Watson | Marine Corps | Private First Class | | | |
| Thomas A. Watson | Marine Corps | Corporal | | | |
| Dale E. Watts | Marine Corps | Private | | | |
| George A. Weber | Marine Corps | Private First Class | | | |
| John F. Weber | Marine Corps | Captain | | | |
| Carl W. Weiss | Marine Corps | Sergeant | | | |
| George L. Weiss | Marine Corps | Platoon Sergeant | | | |
| Charles E. Welch | Marine Corps | Private First Class | | | |
| Warren W. Welch | Marine Corps | Private First Class | | | |
| Dean A. Wells | Marine Corps | Corporal | | | |
| Erskine W. Wells | Marine Corps | Captain | | | |
| John K. Wells | Marine Corps | First Lieutenant | | | |
| Robert E. Wellwood | Marine Corps | First Lieutenant | | | |
| Walter W. Wensinger | Marine Corps | Colonel | Iwo Jima, Volcano Islands | February 19 – March 16, 1945 | |
| Charles A. West | Marine Corps | Sergeant | | | |
| Theodore G. West | Marine Corps | Private | | | |
| William R. West | Marine Corps | First Lieutenant | | | |
| Joseph J. Whalen | Marine Corps | Gunnery Sergeant | | | |
| Dale W. Whaley | Marine Corps | Private First Class | | | |
| William J. Whaling | Marine Corps | Colonel | Okinawa, Ryukyu Islands | April 15 – June 21, 1945 | |
| Algie J. Wheeler | Marine Corps | Sergeant | | | |
| John H. Wherry | Marine Corps | Gunnery Sergeant | | | |
| George O. White | Marine Corps | Private First Class | | | |
| Philip R. White | Marine Corps | Captain | | | |
| J. W. Whitley | Marine Corps | Sergeant | | | |
| Forest Whitt | Marine Corps | Private First Class | | | |
| Sumner H. Whitten | Marine Corps | First Lieutenant | | | |
| Charles F. Widdecke | Marine Corps | Captain | | | |
| Vincent H. Wiehardt | Marine Corps | Sergeant | | | |
| Richard S. Wilcox | Marine Corps | First Lieutenant | | | |
| Philip A. Wilheit | Marine Corps | Captain | | | |
| Harry B. Williams | Marine Corps | First Sergeant | | | |
| James B. Williams III | Marine Corps | First Lieutenant | | | |
| Maxie R. Williams | Marine Corps | Captain | | | |
| Robert H. Williams | Marine Corps | Lieutenant Colonel | Gavutu, Solomon Islands | August 7, 1942 | |
| Leon M. Williamson | Marine Corps | Captain | | | |
| Jasper Willis | Marine Corps | Private First Class | | | |
| William L. Willis | Marine Corps | Second Lieutenant | | | |
| Nicholas A. Willox | Marine Corps | Private | | | |
| Ray E. Wilson Jr. | Marine Corps | Private First Class | | | |
| William W. Wilson Jr. | Marine Corps | Platoon Sergeant | | | |
| Augustus H. Winchester | Marine Corps | First Sergeant | | | |
| Albert H. Winius | Marine Corps | Platoon Sergeant | | | |
| Andrew N. Winsor | Marine Corps | Corporal | | | |
| Junior H. Wirth | Marine Corps | Private First Class | | | |
| Charles L. Wise | Marine Corps | Private | | | |
| Millard H. Wiser | Marine Corps | Private First Class | | | |
| Henry J. Witkowski | Marine Corps | Corporal | | | |
| William J. Wlasiuk | Marine Corps | Sergeant | | | |
| John J. Woerner | Marine Corps | Corporal | | | |
| Donald W. Wolf | Marine Corps | Sergeant | | | |
| William H. Wolvington | Marine Corps | Corporal | | | |
| Joseph E. Wood | Marine Corps | Private | | | |
| Ralph K. Wood | Marine Corps | Private First Class | | | |
| George R. Woosley | Marine Corps | Private First Class | | | |
| Thomas A. Wornham | Marine Corps | Colonel | Iwo Jima, Volcano Islands | February 19 – March 27, 1945 | |
| Barney V. Wright | Marine Corps | Corporal | | | |
| Frank J. Wright | Marine Corps | First Lieutenant | | | |
| John D. Wright | Marine Corps | Corporal | | | |
| Edward R. Wygal | Marine Corps | Corporal | | | |

== Y ==
This along with the †, indicates that the Navy Cross was awarded posthumously

| Name | Service | Rank | Place of action | Date of action | Notes |
|---|---|---|---|---|---|
| John T. Yaksich | Marine Corps | Private | | | |
| John Yancey | Marine Corps | Corporal | Guadalcanal, Solomon Islands | November 30, 1942 | First award (second was in Korean War) |
| Roscoe L. Yarbrough | Marine Corps | Corporal | | | |
| James C. Yeaple | Marine Corps | Private First Class | | | |
| Cassin Young | Navy | Captain | near Savo Island | November 12-13, 1942 | Also awarded Medal of Honor |
| Walter X. Young | Marine Corps | First Lieutenant | | | |
| Dennis E. Youngblood | Marine Corps | Private First Class | | | |

== Z ==
This along with the †, indicates that the Navy Cross was awarded posthumously

| Name | Service | Rank | Place of action | Date of action | Notes |
|---|---|---|---|---|---|
| Lawrence N. Zamor | Marine Corps | Corporal | Okinawa, Ryukyu Islands, Empire of Japan | May 6, 1945 | The President of the United States of America takes pleasure in presenting the Navy Cross to Corporal Lawrence N. Zamor (MCSN: 419643), United States Marine Corps Reserve, for extraordinary heroism and devotion to duty while serving as a Squad Leader of Company F, Second Battalion, First Marines, FIRST Marine Division, in action against enemy Japanese forces on Okinawa, Ryukyu Islands, 6 May 1945. Although sustaining a wound which later necessitated the amputation of one of his legs, Corporal Zamor led his squad during an attack on a fanatically-defended enemy hill and crawling forward in the face of intense artillery, mortar and machine-gun fire, destroyed a fieldpiece and annihilated eight Japanese soldiers. By his aggressive fighting spirit and courage, Corporal Zamor contributed materially to the successful advance of his company, and his unwavering devotion to duty was in keeping with the highest traditions of the United States Naval Service. |
| James R. Zarillo † | Marine Corps | Private First Class | Namur, Kwajalein Atoll, Marshall Islands | January 31, 1944 | The President of the United States of America takes pride in presenting the Navy Cross (Posthumously) to Private First Class James R. Zarillo (MCSN: 451610), United States Marine Corps Reserve, for extraordinary heroism as a light machine gunner serving with the Third Battalion, Twenty-Fourth Marines, FOURTH Marine Division in action against enemy Japanese forces during the battle of Namur island, Kwajalein Atoll, Marshall Islands, 1 February 1944. Directed to bring the fire of his gun on a hostile pillbox which had pinned down his assault team in an exposed position in front of the lines, Private First Class Zarillo attempted to carry out these orders but, due to the nature of the terrain, was unable to fire effectively on the enemy emplacement. With utter disregard for his own personal safety, he took his machine gun in his arms and daringly launched a lone attack against the Japanese position, destroying it before he was fatally wounded. Private First Class Zarillo's valiant spirit of self-sacrifice and extreme bravery were in keeping with the highest traditions of the United States Naval Service. He gallantly gave his life for his country. |

== See also ==
- List of Medal of Honor recipients for World War II
- List of Navy Cross recipients for the Korean War
- List of Navy Cross recipients for the Vietnam War
