= Thomas Claxton (disambiguation) =

Thomas Claxton may refer to:

- Thomas Claxton (doorkeeper) (?-1821), Doorkeeper of the United States House of Representatives
- Thomas Claxton (c 1790-1813), Officer in the United States Navy
- Tommy Claxton (born 1944), English footballer, see List of Bury F.C. players

== See also ==
- Thomas Claxton Fidler (1841-1917), British civil engineer
