= USS Stout =

Arleigh Burke-class destroyer

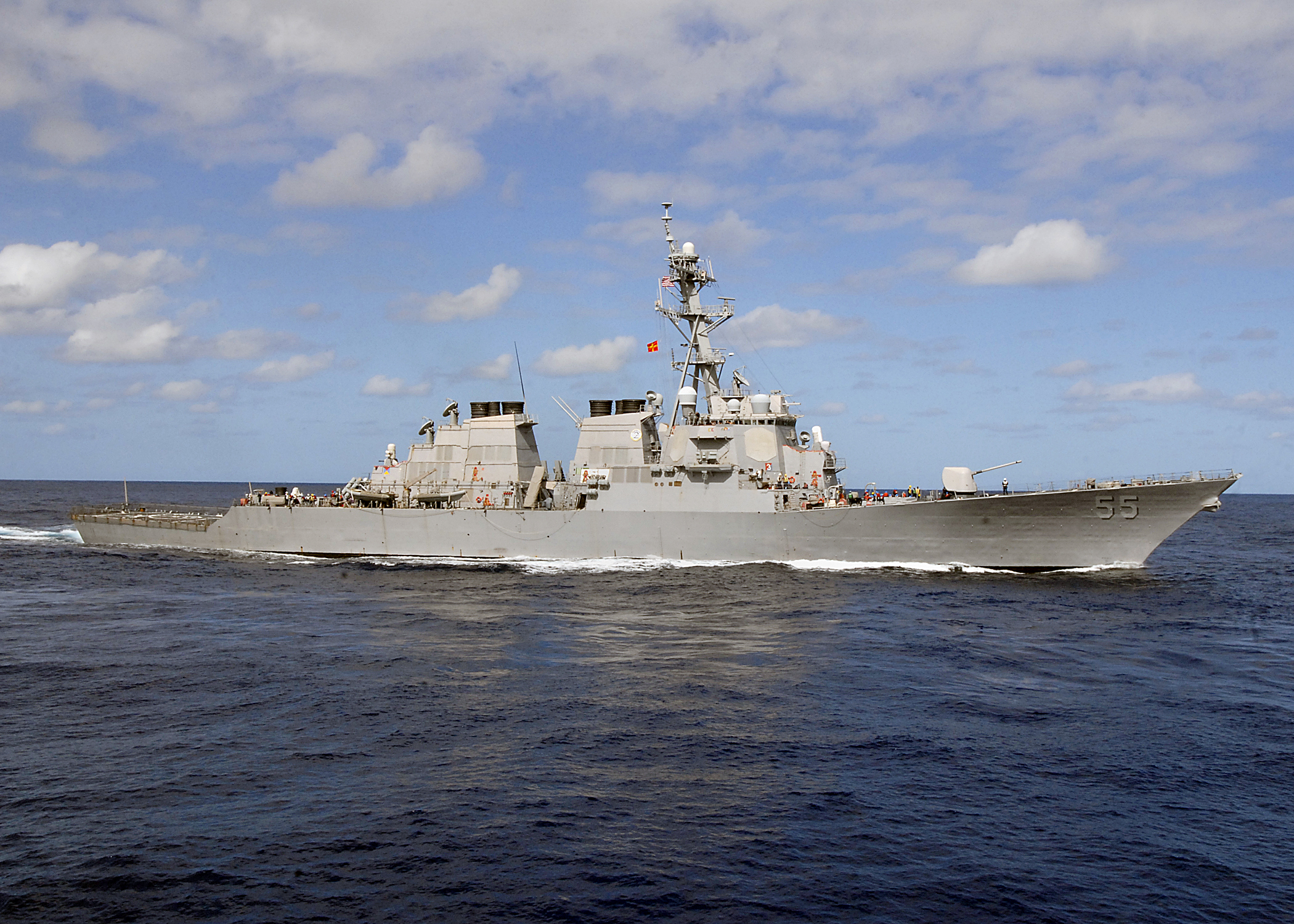
- USS Stout (DDG-55)

History

United States
- Name: Stout
- Namesake: Herald F. Stout
- Ordered: 13 December 1988
- Builder: Ingalls Shipbuilding
- Laid down: 8 August 1991
- Launched: 16 October 1992
- Commissioned: 13 August 1994
- Home port: Norfolk
- Identification: MMSI number: 368873000; Callsign: NSDT; Hull number: DDG-55
- Motto: Tough, rugged, fast and ready; Courage – Valor – Integrity
- Nickname(s): Bold Knight
- Status: in active service
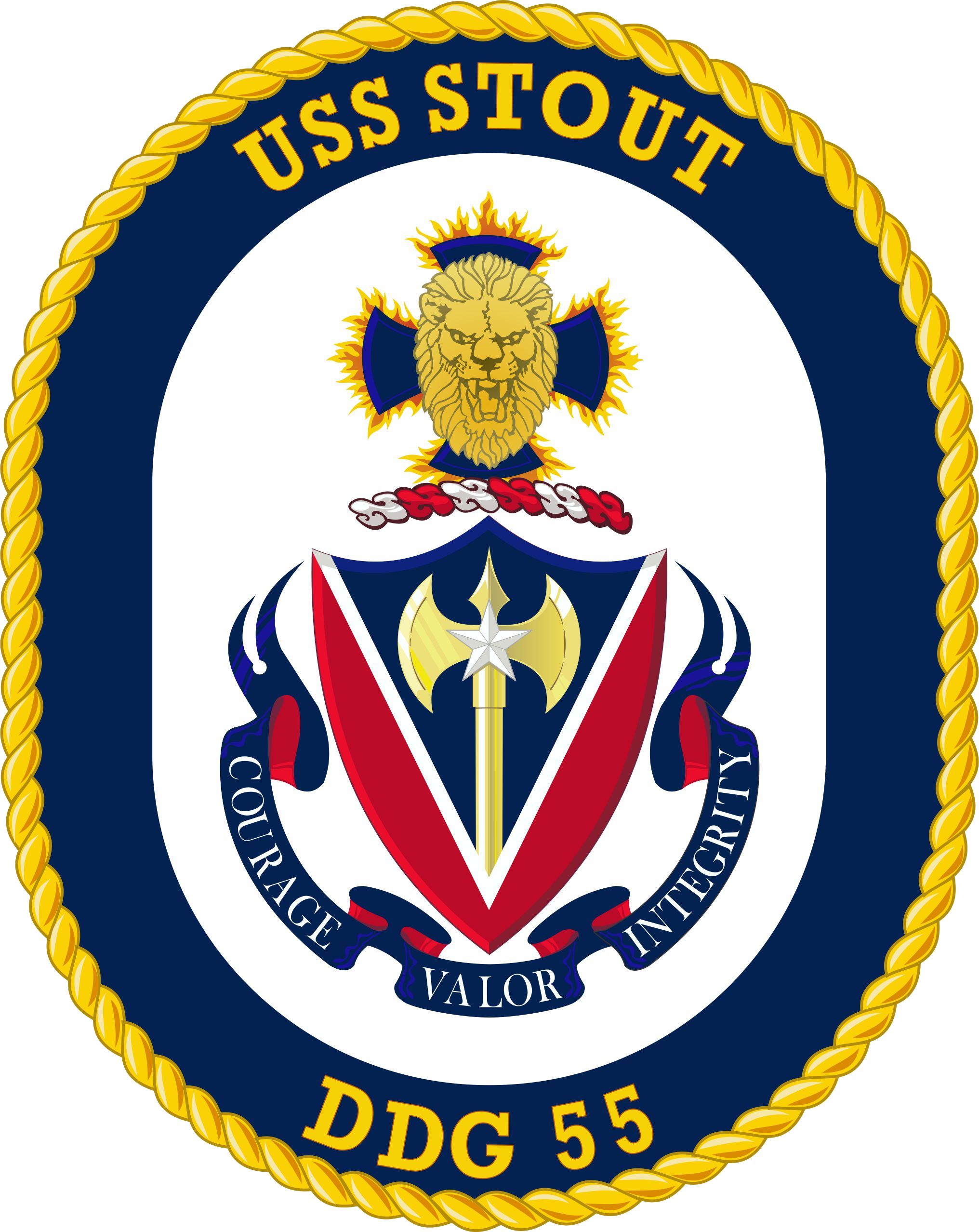
- Badge

General characteristics
- Class & type: Arleigh Burke-class destroyer
- Displacement: Light: approx. 6,800 long tons (6,900 t); Full: approx. 8,900 long tons (9,000 t)
- Length: 505 ft (154 m)
- Beam: 59 ft (18 m)
- Draft: 31 ft (9.4 m)
- Propulsion: 2 × shafts
- Speed: In excess of 30 kn (56 km/h; 35 mph)
- Range: 4,400 nmi (8,100 km; 5,100 mi) at 20 kn (37 km/h; 23 mph)
- Complement: 33 commissioned officers; 38 chief petty officers; 210 enlisted personnel
- Sensors & processing systems: AN/SPY-1D PESA 3D radar (Flight I, II, IIA); AN/SPY-6(V)1 AESA 3D radar (Flight III); AN/SPS-67(V)3 or (V)5 surface search radar (DDG-51 – DDG-118); AN/SPQ-9B surface search radar (DDG-119 onward); AN/SPS-73(V)12 surface search/navigation radar (DDG-51 – DDG-86); BridgeMaster E surface search/navigation radar (DDG-87 onward); 3 × AN/SPG-62 fire-control radar; Mk 46 optical sight system (Flight I, II, IIA); Mk 20 electro-optical sight system (Flight III); AN/SQQ-89 ASW combat system: AN/SQS-53C sonar array; AN/SQR-19 tactical towed array sonar (Flight I, II, IIA); TB-37U multi-function towed array sonar (DDG-113 onward); AN/SQQ-28 LAMPS III shipboard system
- Electronic warfare & decoys: AN/SLQ-32 electronic warfare suite; AN/SLQ-25 Nixie torpedo countermeasures; Mk 36 Mod 12 decoy launching systems; Mk 53 Nulka decoy launching systems; Mk 59 decoy launching systems
- Armament: Guns: 1 × 5-inch (127 mm)/54 mk 45 mod 1/2 (lightweight gun); 2 × 20 mm (0.8 in) Phalanx CIWS; 2 × 25 mm (0.98 in) Mk 38 machine gun system; 4 × 0.50 inches (12.7 mm) caliber guns; Missiles: 2 × Mk 141 Harpoon anti-ship missile launcher; 1 × 29-cell, 1 × 61-cell (90 total cells) Mk 41 vertical launching system (VLS): RIM-66M surface-to-air missile; RIM-156 surface-to-air missile; BGM-109 Tomahawk cruise missile; RUM-139 vertical launch ASROC; Torpedoes: 2 × Mark 32 triple torpedo tubes: Mark 46 lightweight torpedo; Mark 50 lightweight torpedo; Mark 54 lightweight torpedo
- Aircraft carried: 1 × Sikorsky MH-60R

USS Stout (DDG-55) is an Arleigh Burke-class (Flight I) Aegis guided missile destroyer. Built for the United States Navy by Ingalls Shipbuilding, she was commissioned on 13 August 1994 and she is currently home-ported in Naval Station Norfolk. She is part of Destroyer Squadron 28.

Stout is named for Rear Admiral Herald F. Stout, who distinguished himself as the commanding officer of the destroyer USS Claxton during World War II. In November 1943, Commander Stout received two Navy Crosses in the span of three weeks for his actions in the Pacific. Stout aided Destroyer Squadron 23 in sinking five heavily armed Japanese warships and damaging four others during the Solomon Islands campaign as well as sinking four more Japanese warships and damaging two others to establish a beachhead on Bougainville Island. Stout was ordered on 13 December 1988, the keel was laid down on 8 August 1991, she was launched on 16 October 1992 and commissioned on 13 August 1994. As of January 2024 the ship is part of Destroyer Squadron 28 based out of Naval Station Norfolk.

== Ship history ==
=== Board of Inspection and Survey ===
In April 2008, the ship comprehensively failed her Board of Inspection and Survey examination and was declared "unfit for sustained combat operations." The ship has since passed 13 of 13 rigorous unit level training inspections. Stout deployed in March 2009 on routine security operations in the Sixth Fleet operational area. On 15 July 2009, Fox News Channel reported Stout was in the Black Sea cooperating with Georgian forces in training exercises.

=== Relief of Commanding Officer and several subordinates ===
On 1 March 2011 while on deployment to the Mediterranean Sea in support of the crisis in Libya, Stout's commanding officer, Command Master Chief, and eight other junior officers and non-commissioned officers were relieved by the Commander Sixth Fleet. The cited cause was a "pervasive pattern of unprofessional behavior" among the ship's crew including "fraternization, orders violations and disregard for naval standards of conduct and behavior which contributed to poor crew morale and a hostile command climate."

=== Operation Odyssey Dawn ===
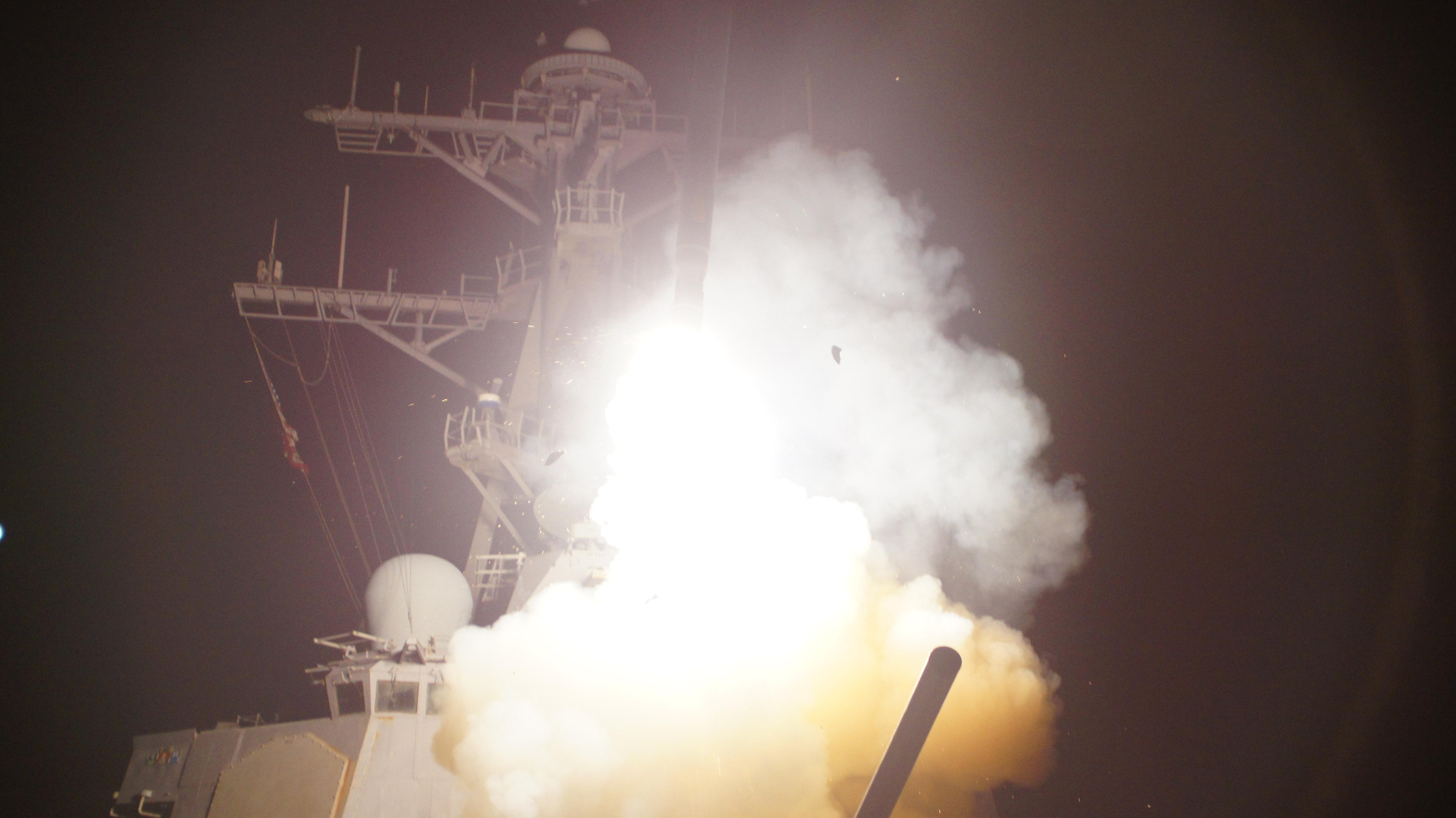
Stout launches a Tomahawk missile in Operation Odyssey Dawn

On 19 March 2011, in conjunction with other US Navy ships, the destroyer launched Tomahawk cruise missiles at Libyan air defenses as part of Operation Odyssey Dawn.

=== Syrian civil war ===
On 28 August 2013, the US Navy announced that Stout, was en route to join four other Arleigh Burke-class destroyers deployed in the eastern Mediterranean Sea amid allegations that the regime of Syrian President Bashar al-Assad used chemical weapons during the ongoing Syrian civil war, including the 2013 Ghouta attacks.

=== Navy record for longest stint at sea ===
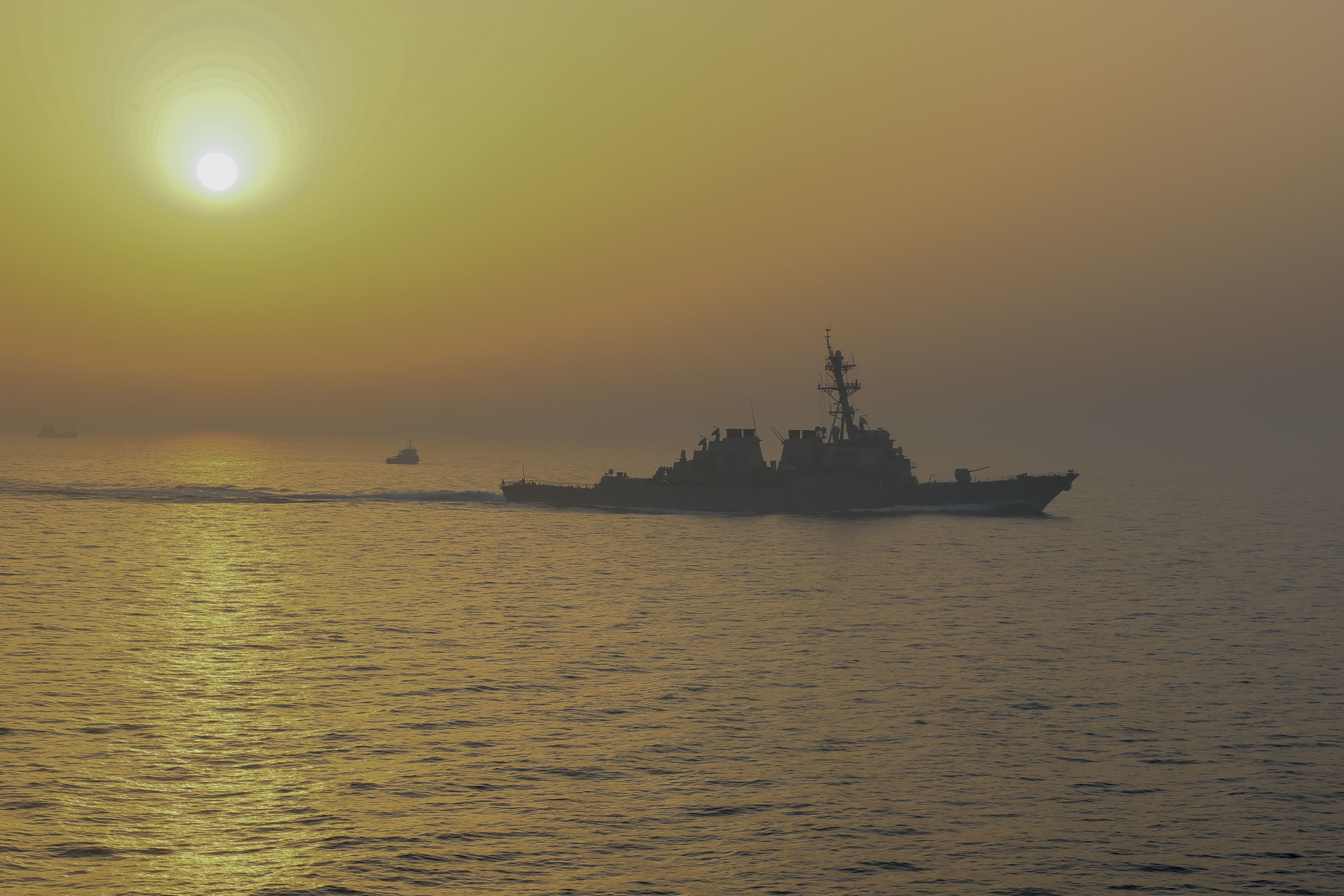
Stout travels alongside the amphibious assault ship USS Bataan during a transit through the Strait of Hormuz, 31 May 2020.

On 3 October 2020, Stout moored in Rota, Spain, after 215 days consecutively at sea, surpassing the Navy's known record of 206 days at sea previously held by carrier USS Dwight D. Eisenhower and cruiser USS San Jacinto. The unusually long deployment was as a result of the COVID-19 pandemic and operational requirements.

== Honors and awards ==
On 16 February 2007, Stout was awarded the 2006 Battle "E".

- Combat Action Ribbon (December 2023 – May 2025)
- CNO Afloat Safety Award (LANTFLT) - (2007)

== Coat of arms ==
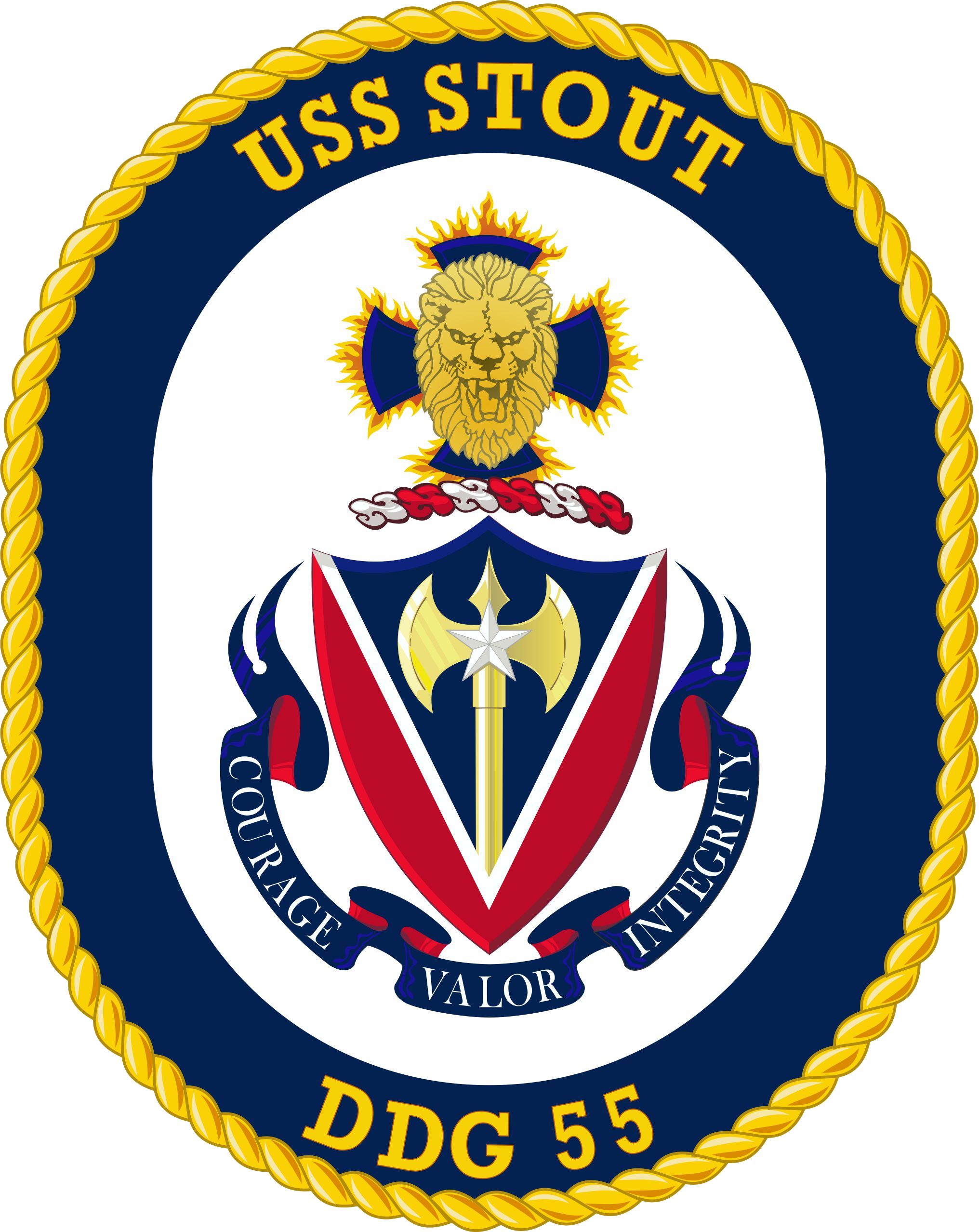

=== Shield ===
The battle axe is adapted from the Stout family's coat of arms. Its upright position underscores Stout's massive firepower and high survivability while the double axe head alludes to the all encompassing offensive and defensive power of the integrated AEGIS combat system. The star highlights Rear Admiral Stout's many awards, including the Silver Star. With courage, then Commander Stout aided his task force in sinking several Japanese warships to establish a beachhead on Bougainville Island. This Naval battle is symbolized by the wedge piercing the field of the shield. The wedge and field represents Rear Admiral Stout and the United States Navy's ability to disable and destroy a surface force of superior firepower.

=== Crest ===
The cross symbolizes the two Navy Crosses Rear Admiral Stout was awarded as well as exemplifies the strong devotion to God and Country that characterized his Naval career. It is inflamed to recall the fierce naval battle during the Solomon Islands campaign. The lion is a metaphor for the courage and strength which Rear Admiral Stout and his crew had during World War II and to those who have served on board Stout (DDG-55).
