= Coolbaugh =

Coolbaugh may refer to:

- Coolbaugh Township, Monroe County, Pennsylvania
- USS Coolbaugh (DE-217), a Buckley-class destroyer escort of the United States Navy

== People ==
- Coolbaugh (surname)

== See also ==
- Mike Coolbaugh Award, Minor League Baseball award
