= Charles E. Rosendahl =

United States Navy vice admiral

Charles Emery Rosendahl
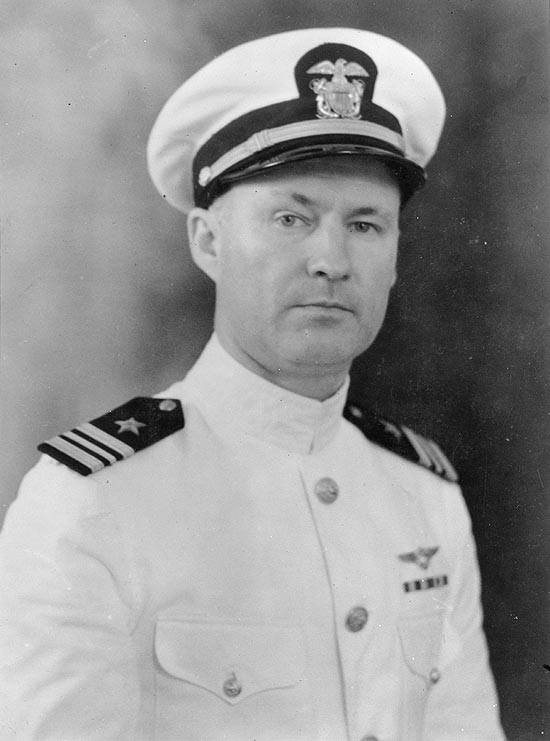
- Lt. Cmdr. Charles Rosendahl, USN, circa 1930
- Born: May 15, 1892; Chicago, Illinois, U.S.
- Died: May 17, 1977 (aged 85); Naval Hospital Philadelphia, Pennsylvania, U.S.
- Military career
- Allegiance: United States
- Branch: United States Navy
- Service years: 1910–1946
- Rank: Vice admiral
- Nickname: Rosey
- Commands: USS Claxton; USS Los Angeles; Rigid Airship Training and Experimental Squadron; USS Akron; NAS Lakehurst; USS Minneapolis; Naval Airship Training Command
- Conflicts: Mexican Revolution; World War I World War II
- Awards: Navy Cross; Distinguished Service Medal; Distinguished Flying Cross

Charles Emery Rosendahl (May 15, 1892 – May 17, 1977) was a highly decorated vice admiral in the United States Navy, and an advocate of lighter-than-air flight.

== Biography ==
=== Early career ===
Rosendahl was born in Chicago, Illinois, although his family subsequently relocated to Kansas and Texas and, in 1910, he was appointed to the Naval Academy from the latter state and was later commissioned in the rank of ensign in June 1914, upon graduation from the academy. He was then ordered to join the armored cruiser West Virginia (ACR-5) off Mexico during the Veracruz crisis. After West Virginia was decommissioned he served briefly on the battleship Oregon (BB-3) and the protected cruiser St. Louis (C-20), before reporting for duty aboard the protected cruiser Cleveland (C-19) on May 14, 1915. On September 15, 1916, he returned to the recommissioned West Virginia, which was subsequently renamed the Huntington. On June 19, 1917, he received promotion to lieutenant (junior grade), and to full lieutenant on August 31, 1918, having served aboard the Huntington escorting convoys of troops and supplies to Europe during World War I.

From June 6, 1918, Rosendahl served as an engineering officer, putting the new destroyer McKean (DD-90) into commission. On July 30, 1919, he was ordered to the Pacific Coast for further duty, first serving on the cruiser Brooklyn (CA-3) as gunnery officer, and receiving promotion to lieutenant commander on January 27, 1920. In August he began fitting out new destroyers, commissioning, and delivering them to the fleet; they included the William Jones (DD-308), Yarborough (DD-314), Marcus (DD-321), and Melvin (DD-335). On July 11, 1921, Rosendahl assumed command of the destroyer Claxton (DD-140), before being ordered to duty at the Naval Academy as an instructor in Department of Electrical Engineering and Physics in September.

=== Move to airships ===
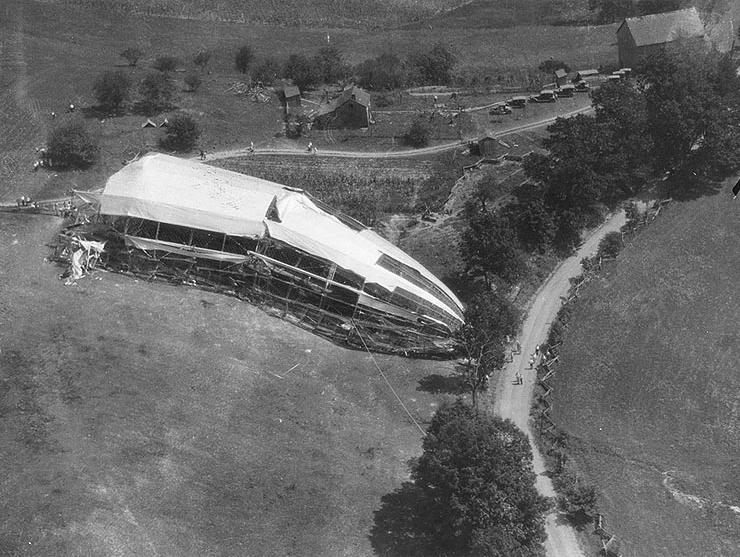
The bow section of Shenandoah after the crash

When the Navy's Bureau of Navigation circulated a letter asking for volunteers for rigid airship duty, Rosendahl volunteered. He reported to Naval Air Station Lakehurst, New Jersey, to be trained in airship operation on April 7, 1923. Designated a naval aviator in November 1924, Rosendahl served on the dirigible Shenandoah (ZR-1) as mooring officer and navigator. Promoted to lieutenant commander on January 5, 1925, he distinguished himself by successfully bringing the bow section of the shattered airship safely to earth after she broke up in the air on September 3, 1925, over Noble County, Ohio. For this action he was later awarded the Distinguished Flying Cross.

From March 9, 1926, he served as executive officer, and then as commanding officer from May 10, of the dirigible Los Angeles (ZR-3), making numerous flights for crew training, radio compass station calibration and flight tests for National Advisory Committee for Aeronautics (NACA). Los Angeles also took part in the searches for Nungesser and Coli's aircraft The White Bird, and Frances Wilson Grayson's Dawn, both of which went missing during attempts on trans-Atlantic flights.

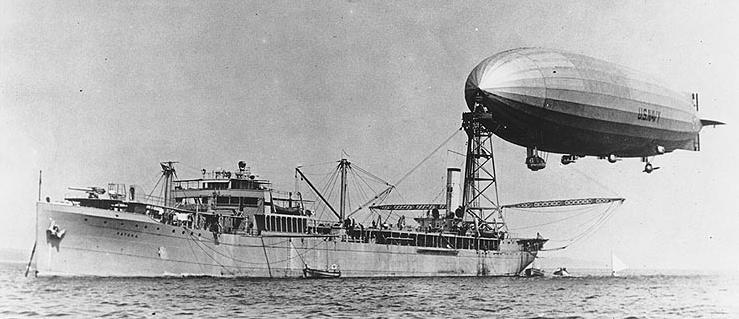
Airship moored to USS Patoka

In January 1928 Rosendahl flew Los Angeles out to sea off Newport, Rhode Island, to rendezvous with the aircraft carrier Saratoga (CV-3) and moored to the ship's stern to take on fuel and stores. Further experimental flights were undertaken, mooring to the airship tender Patoka (AO-9) during long-range flights.

In July 1928 Rosendahl traveled to Britain to observe their airship activities, and then to Germany for the trials of the airship Graf Zeppelin. In October he was an observer aboard the Graf as she made her first Atlantic crossing from Friedrichshafen to Lakehurst.

On May 9, 1929, he was relieved as commanding officer of Los Angeles and assumed duty as the commander of the Rigid Airship Training and Experimental Squadron at NAS Lakehurst. In August he was aboard the Graf Zeppelin's "Round the World" flight as observer and watch officer. On June 27, 1930, Rosendahl was assigned to the Bureau of Aeronautics, in Washington, D.C., and from October 21, 1931, to June 23, 1932, commanded the new dirigible Akron (ZRS-4), during which time experiments in the role as an airborne aircraft carrier were tried. Between July 1932 and June 1934 Rosendahl served at sea on board the battleship West Virginia (BB-48) and heavy cruiser Portland (CA-33).

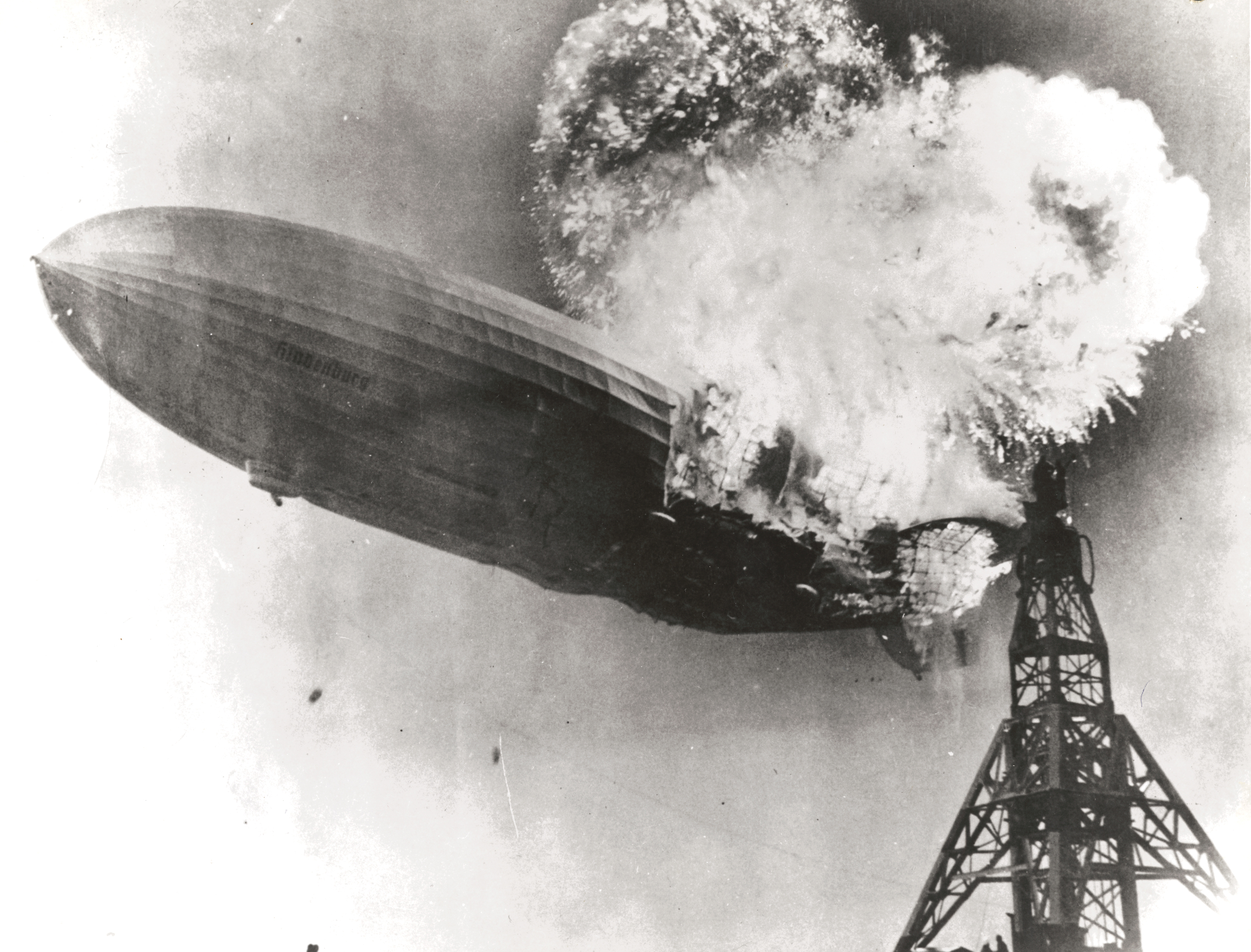
Hindenburg in flames, 6 May 1937

On June 11, 1934, he assumed command at NAS Lakehurst, and was promoted to commander on February 1, 1935. Rosendahl served as an official observer on the German airship Hindenburg, on transatlantic flights between Frankfurt and Rio de Janeiro in August and September 1936. He was in command at Lakehurst on the night of May 6, 1937, and witnessed the destruction of the Hindenburg, leading fire fighting and rescue efforts. He later testified at the Department of Commerce inquiry into the accident and stated:

When I saw the first blaze I knew the ship was doomed and I also thought that there would immediately be an explosion which would flatten every building at the field and kill everybody looking on. I thought it was curtains for all of us.

On August 6, 1938, he was relieved of command of NAS Lakehurst, and on August 31, he reported to Pearl Harbor to serve as executive officer of the light cruiser Milwaukee (CL-5).

On May 23, 1940, he was assigned to the office of the Secretary of the Navy for duty in airship evaluations, and was promoted to the rank of captain on July 13. In September he became the senior member of the board created to investigate sites for new airship stations. On February 25, 1941, he was detached from that duty to serve in the office of the Assistant Secretary of the Navy, and then on April 23, 1942, to the office of Chief of Naval Operations, under the Director of Fleet Training, for airship training and base selection.

=== World War II ===
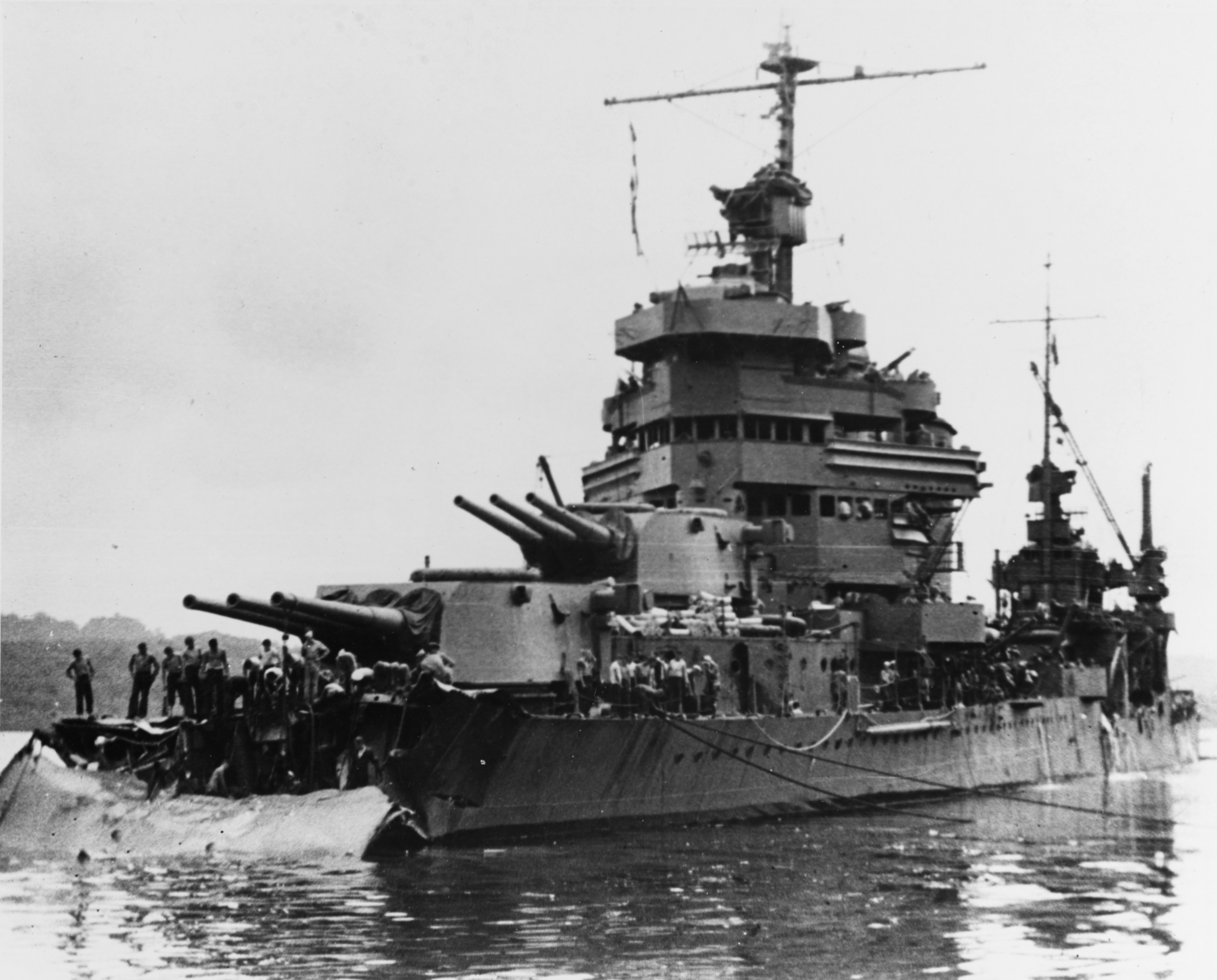
Minneapolis after Tassafaronga with her bows missing

On September 6, 1942, Rosendahl took command of the heavy cruiser Minneapolis (CA-36). The ship was torpedoed during the Battle of Tassafaronga, off Guadalcanal, on November 30, 1942, losing 80 feet (24 m) of her bows and had three of four boilers knocked out. Rosendahl kept her afloat and reached the safety of Tulagi. For this action he was subsequently awarded the Navy Cross. On May 15, he returned to NAS Lakehurst and assumed duty as the Chief of Naval Airship Training Command, receiving promotion to rear admiral on May 26, 1943. This service lasted through World War II, until he retired on November 1, 1946. He was advanced to the rank of vice admiral on the same day.

=== Post-Navy activities ===
Between 1947 and 1952 Rosendahl was an aeronautical consultant and a vice-president of the Flettner Aircraft Corporation, New York. In 1953 he was appointed executive director of the National Air Transport Coordinating Committee, a group set up to study air transport problems in the greater New York area after three crashes in Elizabeth, New Jersey, during 1952.

Rosendahl retired to Toms River, New Jersey, in 1960 to write and to organize the Lighter-Than-Air Museum Association at Lakehurst. The Navy conditionally deeded land to the LTA Museum Association, but because the group was unsuccessful in raising funds, the land reverted to NAS Lakehurst.

The United States Navy ended airship operations in August 1962. Rosendahl was aboard the N class blimp ZPG-3W on the final flight.

Rosendahl died on May 17, 1977, at the Naval Hospital Philadelphia.

== Personal life ==
On June 30, 1932, he met Jean Wilson on a train en route to Los Angeles, California. They were married on December 22, 1934.

== Publications ==
Rosendahl published several books, as well as numerous scientific and popular articles about airships.

- Up Ship! (1931) Dodd, Mead and Company, New York.
- What About the Airship: The Challenge to the United States (1938) Charles Scribner's Sons, New York.
- A History of U.S. Navy Airships in World War II
- SNAFU: The Strange Story of American Airships

His collected papers are held by the University of Texas at Dallas. These include notes for an unpublished study of the attack on Pearl Harbor written with the assistance of Vice Admiral Ryūnosuke Kusaka, who Rosendahl had first met and befriended on the Graf Zeppelin circumnavigation in 1929.

== Memberships ==
Rosendahl was a member of the following organizations:

- Fellow of the Institute of the Aeronautical Sciences
- Member of Advisory Committee and Trustee of the Clifford B. Harmon Trust
- Past President and Life Honorary Member, Wings Club of New York
- Honorary Member and Past President, John Ericsson Society of New York
- Founder and Member of Army-Navy Country Club, Washington, D.C.
- Fifty-year "Gold Card" member of the American Legion, Past Commander and member of its Air Service, Post 501
- Adventurers' Club
- Ye Ancient and Secret Order of Quiet Birdmen
- International Order of Characters
- Explorers' Club
- The Naval Order of the United States

== Honors and awards ==
=== Civilian ===
Rosendahl was the recipient of numerous honors:

- Elder Statesman of Aviation, National Aeronautic Association
- Winner of four Harmon Trophies, Aeronaut-class (1927 & 1940-9), and National Award (1932 & 1933)
- Frank M. Hawks Award
- He was inducted into the Aviation Hall of Fame and Museum of New Jersey in 1980

He also received two honorary degrees:

- Doctor of Science in Aeronautics from the University of Tampa
- Doctor of Laws from Rider College

=== Military decorations ===
Here is the ribbon bar of Vice Admiral Charles E. Rosendahl:

Naval Aviator Badge
1st Row	Navy Cross	Navy Distinguished Service Medal	Distinguished Flying Cross
2nd Row	Mexican Service Medal	World War I Victory Medal with Fleet Clasp	American Defense Service Medal with Atlantic Fleet Clasp
3rd Row	Asiatic-Pacific Campaign Medal with one Service star	American Campaign Medal	World War II Victory Medal

== In popular culture ==
Rosendahl appears in the pilot episode of the NBC series Timeless, where he is portrayed by Kurt Max Runte.
