= Herald F. Stout =

Herald Franklin Stout
- Born: June 15, 1903; Dover, Ohio
- Died: March 23, 1987 (aged 83); San Diego, California
- Burial place: Dover Burial Park, Dover, Ohio
- Military career
- Allegiance: United States
- Branch: United States Navy
- Service years: 1922–1956
- Rank: Admiral
- Units: USS Cincinnati (CL-6); USS Breckinridge; USS Hatfield (DD-231)
- Commands: USS Claxton (DD-571); USS Sierra (AD-18); Mine Squadron 3
- Conflicts: World War II; Solomon Islands campaign; Battle of Empress Augusta Bay; Battle of Cape St. George; Guadalcanal campaign; Battle of Leyte Gulf; Korean War

Herald Franklin Stout (June 6, 1903 – March 23, 1987) was an American admiral in the United States Navy who served in World War II and Korea.

== Early life and career ==
Herald F. Stout was born June 15, 1903, in Dover, Ohio to Franklin Lee and Jemima Mae Tong Stout. After graduating as valedictorian of Roosevelt High School, he entered the United States Naval Academy on appointment from the Sixteenth District of Ohio in 1922. Stout graduated and was commissioned an ensign on June 3, 1926. On the same day, he married his hometown sweetheart, Louise Frederica Finley. They were the parents of three sons.

Following graduation, Stout joined the USS Cincinnati as a main engine division officer, communications officer, radio officer, ship's secretary, and then finally as a gun division officer. Upon detachment from the Cincinnati in June 1931 and subsequent to promotion to lieutenant, Stout had a year's duty as a torpedo and communications Officer aboard the destroyer USS Breckenridge. In June 1932, he was transferred to the destroyer USS Hatfield to serve as torpedo officer and first lieutenant until April 1933.

In September 1942, Stout became commissioning commanding officer of the destroyer USS Claxton, which operated with Destroyer Squadron 23 ("Little Beaver" Squadron) in the Solomon Islands. For outstanding service in command of the Claxton, he was awarded two Navy Crosses.

In January 1952, he became Commander, Mine Squadron THREE, Commander, Western Pacific Minesweeping Force and Commander, Task Group 95.6, operating in the Korean area of hostilities.

After Naval retirement, Rear Admiral Stout was a senior Reliability Design Engineer with Convair Corporation, who produced the Atlas missile, and later a Reliability Engineer with Astronautics, both Divisions of General Dynamics Corporation. Ten years following the death of Louise Frederica Stout, he married Zoe E. Anderson on July 25, 1976, in the church where they met and worked together. Rear Admiral Stout was a Brother of the Fraternity of Free and Accepted Masons. He was a charter and continuing member of the United Church of Christ of La Mesa, California when he died on March 23, 1987.

== Awards ==
In addition to the Navy Cross with gold star, the Distinguished Service Medal, the Silver Star Medal, and the Presidential Unit Citation Ribbon, Rear Admiral Stout was awarded the Second Nicaraguan Campaign Medal, the Yangtze Service Medal, the American Defense Service Medal with star, the American Campaign Medal, the Asiatic-Pacific Campaign Medal with one silver star and two bronze stars (seven engagements), the World War II Victory Medal, the Navy Occupation Service Medal with Asia Clasp, the China Service Medal, the National Defense Service Medal, the Pearl Harbor Commemorative Medal, the Korean Service Medal, the United Nations Service Medal, the Philippine Liberation Ribbon, and the Korean Presidential Unit Citation.

== Navy Cross citation ==
The President of the United States of America takes pleasure in presenting the Navy Cross to Commander Herald Franklin Stout (NSN: 0-60265), United States Navy, for extraordinary heroism and distinguished service in the line of his profession as Commanding Officer of the Destroyer U.S.S. CLAXTON (DD-571), during an engagement with Japanese naval forces at Empress Augusta Bay, off Bougainville, Solomon Islands, on the night of 1–2 November 1943. With his Task Force engaging a Japanese surface force of superior fire power, Commander Stout hurled the full fighting strength of his ship against the enemy and, by his inspiring leadership and skilled combat tactics, aided his Task Force in sinking five hostile warships, in damaging four others and in completely routing the enemy, thereby contributing materially to the successful establishment of our beachhead on Bougainville Island. His determination, relentless fighting spirit and gallant devotion to duty upheld the highest traditions of the United States Naval Service.

== Legacy ==
The destroyer USS Stout was named for Stout in 1992.
