= Coolbaugh (surname) =

Coolbaugh is a surname of German origin, and an Americanized version of Kühlbach. Notable people with the surname include:

- Bob Coolbaugh (1939–1985), American football wide receiver
- Mike Coolbaugh (1972–2007), American baseball player and coach
- Scott Coolbaugh (born 1966), American baseball player
- Walter W. Coolbaugh (1918–1942), United States Navy officer
- William F. Coolbaugh (1821–1877), American politician and banker from Pennsylvania
