= Charles McMorris =

U.S. naval officer

Charles H. McMorris
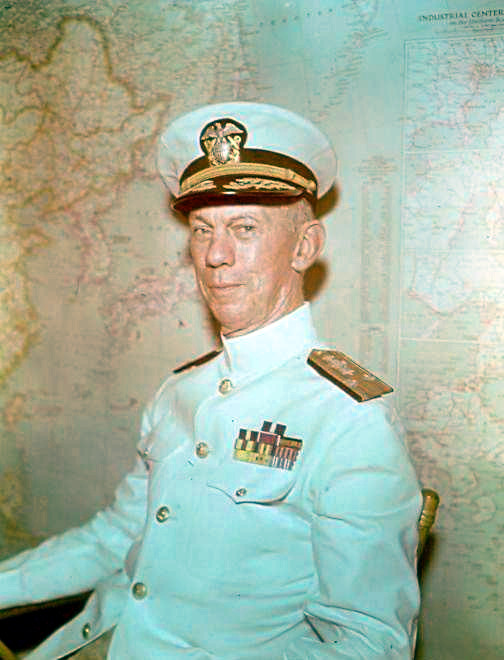
- Born: 31 August 1890; Wetumpka, Alabama, U.S.
- Died: 20 February 1954 (aged 63); Valparaiso, Chile
- Military career
- Allegiance: United States
- Branch: United States Navy
- Service years: 1908–1952
- Rank: Vice Admiral
- Nickname: Soc
- Commands: Fourteenth Naval District; United States Fourth Fleet; Task Group 16.6; Task Force 8
- Conflicts: Occupation of Veracruz; World War I: Atlantic U-boat Campaign; World War II: Battle of Cape Esperance; Aleutian Islands Campaign; Battle of the Komandorski Islands
- Awards: Navy Cross; Navy Distinguished Service Medal (2); Legion of Merit

Charles Horatio "Soc" McMorris (August 31, 1890 – February 11, 1954) was an American rear admiral during World War II, most notably commanding forces at the Battle of the Komandorski Islands during the Aleutian Islands Campaign.

== Early life and career ==
Born in Wetumpka, Alabama, McMorris attended public schools in Wetumpka for several years before entering the United States Naval Academy on June 26, 1908. After graduating fifth in his class on June 8, 1912, McMorris served as an ensign aboard several battleships and cruisers, including the Delaware (BB-28), Montana (ACR-13), and New Hampshire (BB-25), later taking part in the occupation of Veracruz in 1914 as part of the United States' intervention into Mexico. He also served aboard the battleship Maryland (ACR-8), which salvaged the submarine F-4 following its sinking off the coast of Honolulu, Hawaii in 1915.

== World War I ==
A junior officer during World War I, McMorris saw combat in the Atlantic aboard the destroyers Shaw (DD-68) and Meredith (DD-165) prior to his promotion to lieutenant in 1918. During the interwar years, he was stationed in various sea and shore posts before his graduation from the Naval War College in 1938, serving as operations officer to the Hawaiian-based US fleet from 1939 until 1941.

== World War II ==
Appointed war plans officer to the United States Pacific Fleet following the attack on Pearl Harbor, McMorris remained in this post until April 1942 when he was assigned command of Task Force 8 led by the cruiser San Francisco (CA-38). After engaging the Imperial Japanese Navy several times, both in the Aleutian Islands Campaign, specifically at the Battle of the Komandorski Islands and (as well as winning distinction for bravery and the award of the Navy Cross during the Battle of Cape Esperance on October 11–12, 1942), McMorris was named Chief of Staff of the Pacific Fleet in June 1943, as well as a personal advisor to Admiral Chester Nimitz, a post he retained until the end of the war.

== Post-war ==
Briefly serving as vice admiral from September 23, 1944, until July 1948, McMorris commanded the United States Fourth Fleet and presided over the General Board before assuming command of Pearl Harbor's Fourteenth Naval District on August 25, 1948. He eventually commanded the Pearl Harbor naval base before retiring to Marietta, Pennsylvania, where he lived until his death in 1954.

== Namesake ==
The destroyer escort USS McMorris (DE-1036) was named for McMorris.

== Decorations ==

1st Row	Navy Cross	Navy Distinguished Service Medal w/ Gold Star	Legion of Merit	Navy and Marine Presidential Unit Citation w/ Service star
2nd Row	Mexican Service Medal	World War I Victory Medal w/ battle clasp	Nicaraguan Campaign Medal	American Defense Service Medal
3rd Row	American Campaign Medal	Asiatic-Pacific Campaign Medal w/ four service stars	World War II Victory Medal	National Defense Service Medal
