= USS French =

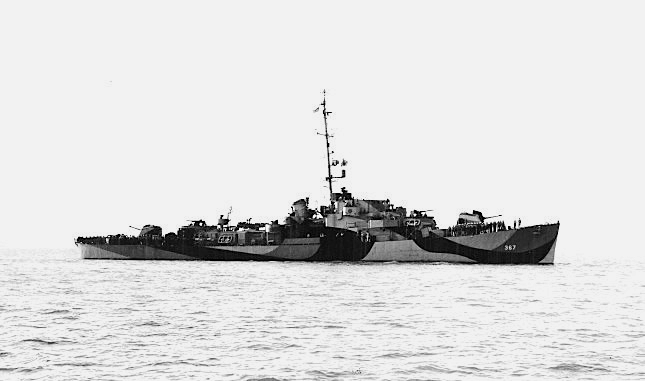
- USS French (DE-367) underway, c. November 1944

History

United States
- Name: French
- Namesake: Neldon Theo French
- Builder: Consolidated Steel Corporation, Orange, Texas
- Laid down: 1 May 1944
- Launched: 17 June 1944
- Commissioned: 9 October 1944
- Decommissioned: 29 May 1946
- Stricken: 15 May 1972
- Fate: Sold for scrapping 20 September 1973

General characteristics
- Class & type: John C. Butler-class destroyer escort
- Displacement: 1,350 long tons (1,372 t)
- Length: 306 ft (93 m)
- Beam: 36 ft 8 in (11.18 m)
- Draft: 9 ft 5 in (2.87 m)
- Propulsion: 2 boilers, 2 geared turbine engines, 12,000 shp (8,900 kW); 2 propellers
- Speed: 24 kn (44 km/h)
- Range: 6,000 nmi (11,000 km) at 12 kn (22 km/h)
- Complement: 14 officers, 201 enlisted
- Armament: 2 × single 5 in (127 mm) guns; 2 × twin 40 mm (1.6 in) AA guns; 10 × single 20 mm (0.79 in) AA guns; 1 × triple 21 in (533 mm) torpedo tubes; 8 × depth charge throwers; 1 × Hedgehog ASW mortar; 2 × depth charge racks

USS French (DE-367) was a John C. Butler-class destroyer escort in service with the United States Navy from 1944 to 1946. She was scrapped in 1973. The ship was named in honor of Neldon Theo French who was awarded the Navy Cross for his actions during the Guadalcanal Campaign.

== Namesake ==
Neldon Theo French was born on 25 July 1918 in Benton County, Tennessee. He enlisted in the United States Marine Corps on 9 September 1940. He was killed in action on 9 October 1942 during the Guadalcanal Campaign. Corporal French was posthumously awarded the Navy Cross for his heroism in fighting to his death in a defensive post on the Matanikau River and shared in the Presidential Unit Citation awarded his division for its performance in the initial landings on Guadalcanal.

== History ==
French was launched on 17 June 1944 by Consolidated Steel Corp. at their yard in Orange, Texas, sponsored by Mrs. Alma M. French, mother of Corporal French. The vessel was commissioned on 9 October 1944.

=== World War II ===
French arrived at San Diego, California, 2 January 1945 for escort duty in the Pacific Ocean, ranging primarily between Ulithi and Eniwetok through April. Other ports of call during this period were Pearl Harbor, Kossol Roads, Saipan, and Iwo Jima. Arriving in Kossol Roads 6 May, French was assigned to patrol and air-sea rescue duty, as well as local screening. On 5 June she bombarded enemy-held Malakal and Arakabesan Islands, then left Peleliu to return to escort duty out of Ulithi. She called at Okinawa on this assignment on 8 and 9 July.

From 24 to 27 July 1945, French was in charge of rescue operations on a grounded U.S. Army freighter at Helen Reef off the Palaus. She lightened the grounded ship by removing some of her cargo so that the tugboat USS Tonkawa could get the freighter off. Escorting the tug and her tow, French returned to Hollandia 31 July, then sailed back to Peleliu. Between 4 and 7 August she took part in the search for survivors of the cruiser USS Indianapolis which had been torpedoed and sunk, before returning to Peleliu.

On 26 August 1945, French arrived at Okinawa, from which she sailed 9 September to cover landings in Japan. After voyaging to Guam to bring occupation troops to Japan, she screened aircraft carriers flying patrols over Japan until 2 January 1946 when she sailed for the U.S. West Coast.

=== Post-war decommissioning ===
French was decommissioned and placed in reserve at San Diego, California, 29 May 1946. On 15 May 1972 she was struck from the Navy list and, on 20 September 1973, she was sold for scrapping.
