= USS Yarborough =

Clemson-class destroyer

History

United States
- Namesake: George Hampton Yarborough, Jr.
- Builder: Bethlehem Shipbuilding Corporation, Union Iron Works, San Francisco
- Laid down: 27 February 1919
- Launched: 20 June 1919
- Commissioned: 31 December 1920
- Decommissioned: 29 May 1930
- Stricken: 3 November 1930
- Fate: Sold for scrap, 25 February 1932

General characteristics
- Class & type: Clemson-class destroyer
- Displacement: 1,308 tons
- Length: 314 feet 4 1/2 inches (95.82 m)
- Beam: 30 feet 11 1/2 inches (9.44 m)
- Draft: 9 feet 4 inches (2.84 m)
- Propulsion: 26,500 shp (20 MW); geared turbines, 2 screws
- Speed: 35 knots (65 km/h)
- Range: 4,900 nmi (9,100 km); @ 15-knot (28 km/h)
- Complement: 122 officers and enlisted
- Armament: 4 × 4 in (100 mm) guns, 1 × 3 in (76 mm) gun, 12 × 21-inch (533 mm) torpedo tubes

USS Yarborough (DD-314) was a Clemson-class destroyer in the United States Navy.

== Namesake ==
George Hampton Yarborough Jr. was born on 14 October 1895 in Roxboro, North Carolina. He graduated from The Citadel in 1916 and enrolled in class no. 4, United States Marine Corps Reserves, on 7 April 1917, the day after the United States entered World War I. After instruction at the Marine Barracks, Parris Island, South Carolina, he reported to the Marine Barracks at Philadelphia, Pennsylvania on 4 June 1917 for duty with the 16th Company, 5th Marine Regiment. Taken to New York on USS Seattle, he embarked on USS Henderson on 14 June 1917 sailed for France that day; and reached St. Nazaire on 27 June.

He was promoted to first lieutenant on 11 August 1917 and served two tours of detached duty while assigned to the 5th Regiment, first at Cosne, France, between 8 December 1917 and 4 January 1918 and then at Gondrecourt, between 22 February and 29 April 1918.

On 23 June 1918, the height of the Battle of Belleau Wood, he arrived on the front lines. The next day, intense enemy fire from skillfully placed machine guns pinned down Yarborough's platoon in a support position in the American lines. He dashed from one shell hole to another, in the open, steadying his men, until a burst of machine gun fire hit him. Severely wounded, he refused aid until other wounded men in his unit received medical attention. Finally moved to shelter, he succumbed to his severe gunshot wounds on 26 June 1918. Cited for his bravery, He was posthumously awarded the Distinguished Service Cross and Navy Cross.

== History ==
Yarborough was laid down on 27 February 1919 at San Francisco, California, by the Bethlehem Shipbuilding Corporation's Union Iron Works plant; launched on 20 June 1919; sponsored by Miss Kate Burch, the fiancée of the late Lt. Yarborough; designated DD-314 on 17 July 1920; and commissioned at the Mare Island Navy Yard, Vallejo, California, on 31 December 1920, Lieutenant Commander Charles E. Rosendahl – later the Navy's pre-eminent authority on airships – in command.

Following commissioning, Yarborough was fitted out at Mare Island into late January 1921 and departed the yard on the 25th, bound for Port Richmond, California, where she fueled. After trials in San Francisco Bay, Monterey Bay, and San Pedro Bay, the new destroyer tied up at the Reserve Dock at San Diego, California, on 2 February. Outside a trip to San Pedro with liberty parties embarked, the ship remained pierside through mid-April.

One event was noteworthy during the ship's largely port-bound routine in 1921. She embarked Marine detachments from the cruisers Charleston (CA-19) and Salem (CL-3), both units under the command of 1st Lt. J. K. Martensteen, USMC, and transported them to Santa Catalina Island on 18 April. Underway from San Diego at 0615 on the 18th, she stood into Isthmus Cove, Santa Catalina Island at 1145, anchoring at 1205. After landing the marines, she got underway and hove to briefly to embark a passenger - Capt. Franck T. Evans, the chief of staff to Commander, Destroyer Force, Pacific Fleet and the son of the famous admiral Robley D. ("Fighting Bob") Evans - before she resumed her passage. Unfortunately, Yarborough collided with a buoy at the entrance to San Pedro harbor - an embarrassing occurrence in view of the ship's high-ranking passenger. Fortunately, the ship sustained only minor damage to a propeller blade, and no disciplinary action was taken.

Yarborough remained alongside the Santa Fe dock at San Diego until 30 June, when she headed for the Mare Island Navy Yard. After a drydocking, the destroyer ran trials off the southern California coast, during which she shipped heavy seas over the forecastle that caused some damage to her bridge on 11 July. Visiting San Francisco briefly, the destroyer returned to San Diego on the 13th, where she remained into mid-October.

Yarborough subsequently ran gunnery exercises and drills in company with her sistership Wood (DD-317) late in October, after receiving on board a large draft of men from Jacob Jones (DD-130). Yarborough apparently joined the operating segment of the "rotating reserves" at that point because the rest of her career was largely one of operational activity.

She spent the majority of 1922 operating from San Diego, touching at ports in the Pacific Northwest like Port Angeles and Seattle, Washington, and familiar California ports like San Diego and San Pedro. Upon occasion, she operated with the battleship forces and conducted drills and exercises in antisubmarine screening, torpedo firings, and, of course, the staple, gunnery.

The following year, however, Yarborough began her voyages beyond what had become the usual west coast routine. After maneuvers out of San Pedro with the Battle Fleet, Yarborough departed that port on 9 February 1923, bound for Magdalena Bay, Mexico. Arriving there on the 6th, in company with Destroyer Squadrons 11 and 12 and the destroyer tender Melville (AD-2), she was underway again two days later this time bound for Panama.

In the succeeding days that February, Yarborough took part in the first of the large United States Fleet exercises - Fleet Problem I. Staged off the coast of Panama, Fleet Problem I pitted the Battle Fleet against an augmented Scouting Fleet. Yarborough screened the Battle Fleet's dreadnoughts, often serving as a picket in a special defensive screen arrangement ahead of the heavy units. The exercise continued into March; and, during a lull in the maneuvers, Secretary of the Navy Edwin C. Denby, embarked in Henderson (AP-1), reviewed the assembled forces on 14 March.

After further exercises, Yarborough departed the Panama area on 31 March as part of the screen for the northward-bound battleships. She arrived at San Diego on 11 April. For the remainder of the year, her schedule remained routine, operations within the vicinity of San Diego, San Francisco, or San Pedro, with a period under repairs at Mare Island and dry-docked on a marine railway at San Diego.

On 2 January 1924, Yarborough got underway for Panama to participate in the next series of fleet exercises - Fleet Problems II, III, and IV - conducted concurrently. Problem II simulated the first leg of a westward advance across the Pacific; Problem III tested the Caribbean defenses and the transit facilities of the Panama Canal; and Problem IV simulated the movement from a main base in the western Pacific to the Japanese home islands—represented in that case by islands, cities, and countries surrounding the Caribbean.

Yarborough's role in the maneuvers was similar to those she had performed before. However, there was one exception because, during one phase of the exercises, she operated with Langley (CV-1)—the Navy's first aircraft carrier. She screened Langley on 25 January and witnessed an air attack upon the ship by planes of the "black" fleet. The destroyer also performed those tasks for which she had been designed (torpedo attacks and screening maneuvers) both with and against battleships. Yarborough and her sister-ships participated in the intensive exercises through late February, after which the destroyer paid a brief call upon New Orleans, Louisiana, her only visit ever to that port, between 1 March and 11 March.

After further exercises off Puerto Rico, Yarborough headed for home; transited the Panama Canal on 8 April; and arrived at San Diego on the 22d. For the remainder of the year, she operated in and around her home port.

The Scouting Fleet once more "battled" the Battle Fleet in March 1925, in Fleet Problem V, off the coast of Baja California. After that series of exercises which trained the Fleet in protective screening, seizing and occupying an unfortified anchorage, fueling at sea, and conducting submarine attacks, the Fleet set its course westward.

Yarborough departed San Francisco as part of this movement on 15 April 1925. Her log noted: "underway in company with the United States Fleet to engage in joint Army and Navy Problem No. 3 and proceed to the Hawaiian Islands." Screening Battleship Division 5, as a unit of Destroyer Division 34, she proceeded via Mamala Bay, Oahu, and arrived at Pearl Harbor, Hawaii, on 28 April. When the Fleet later concentrated in Lahaina Roads, Maui, Yarborough served a brief tour as guardship, patrolling off the entrance to the Fleet anchorage.

During subsequent maneuvers out of Lahaina, Yarborough and her mates performed as "Cruiser Division 1" for the sake of the exercise, acting in that guise from 19 to 29 May, before returning to Pearl Harbor for upkeep.

After visiting Hilo, Yarborough departed Pearl Harbor on 1 July 1925, bound for the South Pacific as part of the Fleet's Australian cruise. Yarborough subsequently visited Pago Pago, Samoa, from 10 to 11 July; Melbourne, Australia, from 23 to 30 July; Lyttelton, New Zealand, from 11 to 21 August; and Wellington, New Zealand, from 22 to 24 August. Returning via Pago Pago, Yarborough and her division mates were pressed into service on 7 September as part of the dragnet searching for the downed PN-9 No. 1 - a flying boat which attempted to make a flight from the west coast to Hawaii. Destroyer Division 34's ships steamed at eight-mile (13 km) intervals in a scouting line and searched over the next three days before word reached them that PN-9 No. 1 had been found, her crew having stripped the plane's lower wings and used the fabric to rig a sail that had taken them close to Oahu.

Yarborough eventually returned via Pearl Harbor to San Diego on 19 September and remained in the vicinity of her home port for the remainder of 1925. Early the following year, 1926, she took part in Fleet Problem VI, off the west coast of Central America, operating with the Battle Fleet and its train convoy against the "enemy" forces as represented by the Scouting Fleet and Control Force. Yarborough later visited Port Aberdeen, Port Angeles, Washington, and the Puget Sound Navy Yard before she rounded out the year operating locally from San Diego.

The year 1927 proved to be a busy one for Yarborough, one that she began, as usual, at San Diego. Departing that port on 17 February, the destroyer transited the Panama Canal on 5 March, Atlantic-bound. The loss of the German steamship Albatross, however, forced a change in plans. Yarborough re-transited the canal four days later, on 9 March, and headed for the Galápagos Islands in company with the rest of Destroyer Division 34. Forming a scouting line, the flush-deckers combed the seas for survivors of the Albatross. During the search, Yarborough often operated in sight of her sisterships Sloat (DD-316) and Shirk (DD-318) but found nothing. Abandoning the search on the 13th, the ship retransmitted the canal and rejoined the Fleet.

Participating in Fleet Problem VII later that month, Yarborough operated off Gonaïves, Haiti, and visited Staten Island and New York late in May and early in June. While in the New York area, the destroyer participated in the presidential review, when President Calvin Coolidge inspected the Fleet from the decks of his presidential yacht, Mayflower, on 4 June.

Yarborough subsequently headed for Panama, arriving at Colon on 9 June. She shifted to Puerto Cabezas, Nicaragua, soon thereafter, due to an outbreak of unrest there. She joined Denver (PG-28) and Robert Smith (DD-324) in guarding American interests in that port before heading back to Colon, retransiting the Panama Canal, and undergoing a drydocking at Balboa. She returned to Puerto Cabezas on 9 July and found Tulsa (PG-22) and Shirk in port.

Yarborough remained at Puerto Cabezas into early August, drilling her landing force in light marching order early in the deployment to be ready for any emergency. The destroyer sailed for the Panama Canal on 5 August, transited the canal on the 7th, and arrived at San Diego on the 23rd. She exercised out of San Diego and off San Clemente Island for the rest of 1927.

The following spring, Yarborough again operated in Hawaiian waters, taking part in Fleet Problem VIII which was staged between San Francisco and Honolulu. Returning to the west coast upon completion of that group of maneuvers, the destroyer continued her regular schedule of operations in tactics and gunnery out of Port Angeles, San Diego, and San Pedro.

Yarborough participated in her final large-scale maneuvers in January 1929, operating between San Diego and the westward side of the Panama Canal Zone, in Fleet Problem IX. That problem - significant in that the new aircraft carrier Lexington (CV-2) participated in the Fleet's war games for the first time - pitted the Battle Fleet (less submarines and Lexington) against a combination of forces including the Scouting Force (augmented by Lexington), the Control Forces, Train Squadron 1, and 15th Naval District and local Army defense forces. The scenario studied the effects of an attack upon the Panama Canal and conducted the operations necessary to carry out such an eventuality. As before, Yarborough's role was with the Battle Fleet, screening the dreadnoughts of the battle line.

After alternating periods in port and operating locally, Yarborough was moored at the Destroyer Base at San Diego that autumn and prepared for decommissioning. Simultaneously, she participated in the reactivation of ships that had been in reserve during the past few years. Two of those ships were Upshur (DD-144) and Tarbell (DD-142).

== Fate ==
Yarborough was decommissioned on 29 May 1930; and, on 3 November 1930, her name was struck from the Navy List. Scrapped on 20 December of the same year, her remains were sold as scrap metal on 25 February 1932.

As of 2019, no other ships have been named Yarborough.
