= USS Cook (APD-130) =

Crosley-class transport

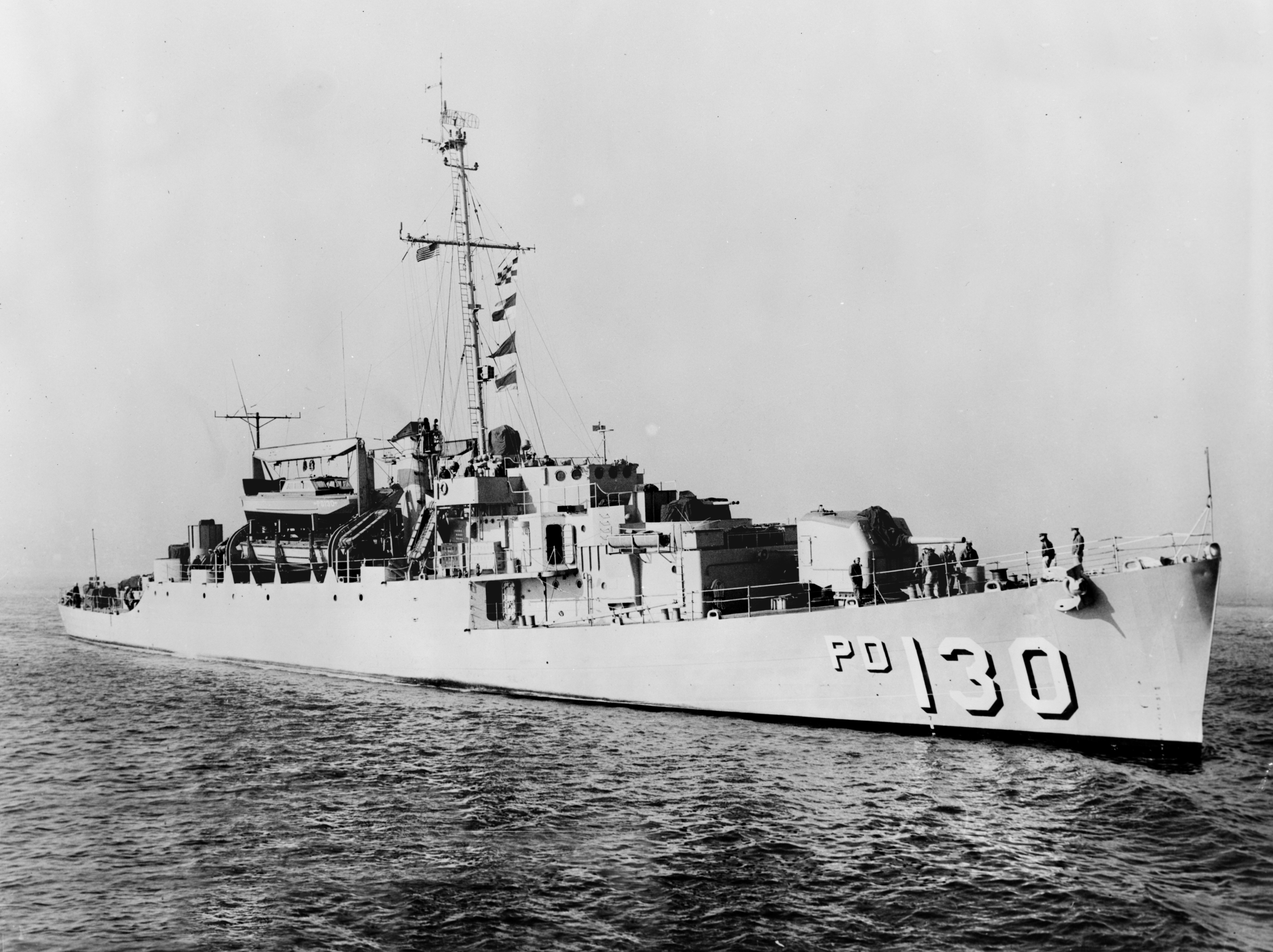
- USS Cook (APD-130) in December 1956

History

United States
- Name: USS Cook
- Namesake: Andrew F. Cook, Jr. & Dallas H. Cook
- Ordered: 1942
- Builder: Defoe Shipbuilding Company, Bay City, Michigan
- Laid down: 7 May 1944
- Launched: 26 August 1944
- Commissioned: 25 April 1945
- Decommissioned: 31 May 1946
- Recommissioned: 6 October 1953
- Decommissioned: Date unknown
- Stricken: 15 November 1969
- Honors and awards: 7 campaign stars (Vietnam)
- Fate: Sold for scrap, 24 July 1970

General characteristics
- Class & type: Crosley-class high speed transport
- Displacement: 1,450 long tons (1,473 t)
- Length: 306 ft (93 m)
- Beam: 36 ft 10 in (11.23 m)
- Draft: 13 ft 6 in (4.11 m)
- Propulsion: 2 × Combustion Engineering DR boilers; Turbo-electric drive with 2 × General Electric steam turbines; 2 × solid manganese-bronze 3600 lb. 3-bladed propellers, 8 ft 6 in (2.59 m), 7 ft 7 in (2.31 m) pitch; 12,000 hp (8.9 MW); 2 rudders; 359 tons fuel oil
- Speed: 23 knots (43 km/h; 26 mph)
- Range: 3,700 nmi (6,900 km) at 15 kn (28 km/h; 17 mph); 6,000 nmi (11,000 km) at 12 kn (22 km/h; 14 mph)
- Boats & landing craft carried: 4 × LCVPs
- Troops: 162 troops
- Complement: 204 (12 officers, 192 enlisted)
- Armament: 1 × 5"/38 caliber gun; 3 × twin 40 mm guns; 6 × single 20 mm guns; 2 × depth charge tracks

USS Cook (APD-130) was a Crosley-class high speed transport of the United States Navy, named after two brothers: Second Lieutenant Andrew F. Cook Jr. (1920–1942) and Sergeant Dallas H. Cook (1921–1942). Both served in the Marine Corps, and both were awarded the Navy Cross, posthumously.

Cook was laid down at the Defoe Shipbuilding Company in Bay City, Michigan on 7 May 1944 and partially completed as a Rudderow-class destroyer escort with the hull number DE-714. A month before launching, on 17 July 1944, it was decided that Cook would be completed as a high-speed transport, with the designation APD-130. She was launched on 26 August 1944, sponsored by Mrs. A. F. Cook, mother of Second Lieutenant Cook and Sergeant Cook. She was commissioned on 25 April 1945, at the Todd-Johnson Dry Dock Company in New Orleans, Louisiana.

== Namesakes ==
Andrew Fred Cook Jr. was born on 2 January 1920 in Alpoca, West Virginia. He enlisted in the United States Marine Corps on 15 September 1938. He served in the field from 10 May 1942, and he was promoted to second lieutenant on 14 July 1942. He was killed in action in the Guadalcanal Campaign on 4 November 1942, receiving the Navy Cross for gallantry and self-sacrifice in the action in which he died.

Andrew Cook's younger brother, Dallas Harry Cook was born on 19 May 1921. He enlisted in the U.S. Marine Corps on 14 August 1940. After service at Quantico, Guantanamo Bay and Puerto Rico, he served in the field from 14 February 1942. He was promoted to sergeant on 21 May 1942 and was killed in action in the Raid on Makin Island on 18 August 1942. He was posthumously awarded the Navy Cross for his actions during the raid.

== Service history ==
=== 1945–1946 ===
On 17 February 1945 Cook left Bay City, Michigan for New Orleans, Louisiana by way of the Great Lakes and the Mississippi River for outfitting. On the 25th the USS Cook was commissioned and set sail for a shakedown cruise to Guantanamo Bay, Cuba. Cook departed Guantanamo Bay as a fighting ship for Norfolk, Virginia and arrived there on 4 June. Cook sailed from Norfolk, Virginia, on 19 June 1945 carrying 100 US Army passengers for San Diego, via the Panama Canal, arriving at San Diego on 2 July for training. On 16 August 1945 Cook, along with other APD's, was dispatch on a high speed run to Tokyo, Japan. On 4 September, she arrived in Tokyo Bay carrying men of the Underwater Demolition Teams. After transporting troops to Okinawa, Cook reconnoitered and landed UDT 20 at Hakodate, Hokkaidō before its occupation on 27 September. She sailed home from Yokohama by way of Guam, Eniwetok, and Pearl Harbor, to San Diego, arriving there on 13 November. After repairs, she spent the month of January transporting troops along the west coast. Cook was placed out of commission in reserve on 31 May 1946, berthed at San Diego.

=== 1953–1969 ===
Cook was recommissioned on 6 October 1953, and took part in training and landing exercises off San Diego. She entered Mare Island Naval Shipyard for conversion to an APD flagship between 28 November 1953 and 15 March 1954, and continued training operations out of San Diego until 19 November, when she sailed for the Far East. After participating in amphibious exercises on the west coast of Korea, she operated from 21 January 1955 to 19 May as flagship for "Operation Passage to Freedom", the evacuation of refugees from North Vietnam.

Cook returned to San Diego on 12 June 1955, and sailed in various landing and training exercises as primary control vessel or anti-submarine ship. In November, she joined in a combined amphibious operation with Canadian forces. Local operations off California, including a period of service as a submarine target vessel, continued until 21 March 1956, when she sailed to Kauai, Hawaii, for an amphibious exercise in which she served as control vessel.

Cook returned to San Diego on 23 April 1956 for maintenance anti-submarine exercises, and public orientation cruises, until 22 August 1957, when she departed for a tour of duty in the western Pacific based at Yokosuka. She stood by off Borneo during the Indonesian crisis from 14 to 22 December. Back home in San Diego on 10 April 1958, Cook participated in operations along the west coast, including major interservice exercises, and between 13 October 1959 and 29 April 1960 cruised in the Far East once more. Returning to the United States, Cook operated along the west coast for the remainder of 1960.

Cook made three cruises to Vietnam between 1966 and 1969, carrying underwater demolition teams.

Cook was struck from the Naval Vessel Register on 15 November 1969, and sold for scrapping on 24 July 1970, to National Metal and Steel Corporation, Terminal Island, California.

== Awards ==
- American Campaign Medal
- World War II Victory Medal
- Navy Occupation Service Medal
- National Defense Service Medal with one bronze star
- Vietnam Service Medal with seven campaign stars
- Republic of Vietnam Campaign Medal
