= USS Frybarger =

Buckley-class destroyer escort

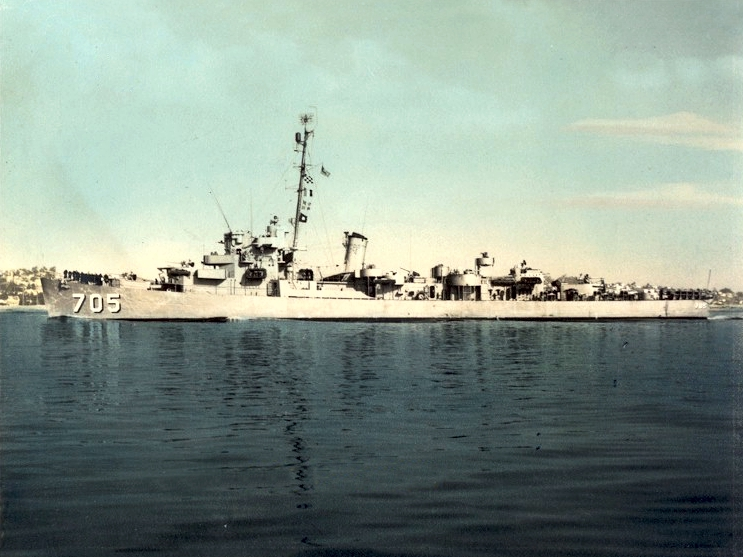

History

United States
- Name: USS Frybarger
- Namesake: Raymond Frybarger, Jr.
- Ordered: 1942
- Builder: Defoe Shipbuilding Company, Bay City, Michigan
- Laid down: 1943
- Launched: 24 January 1944
- Commissioned: 18 May 1944
- Decommissioned: 30 June 1947
- Recommissioned: 6 October 1950
- Decommissioned: 9 December 1954
- Reclassified: DEC-705, 13 September 1950; DE-705, 27 December 1957
- Stricken: 1 December 1972
- Fate: Sold for scrap, 27 November 1973

General characteristics
- Class & type: Buckley-class destroyer escort
- Displacement: 1,400 long tons (1,422 t) standard; 1,740 long tons (1,768 t) full load
- Length: 306 ft (93 m)
- Beam: 37 ft (11 m)
- Draft: 9 ft 6 in (2.90 m) standard; 11 ft 3 in (3.43 m) full load
- Propulsion: 2 × boilers; General Electric turbo-electric drive; 12,000 shp (8.9 MW); 2 × solid manganese-bronze 3,600 lb (1,600 kg) 3-bladed propellers, 8 ft 6 in (2.59 m) diameter, 7 ft 7 in (2.31 m) pitch; 2 × rudders; 359 tons fuel oil
- Speed: 23 knots (43 km/h; 26 mph)
- Range: 3,700 nmi (6,900 km) at 15 kn (28 km/h; 17 mph); 6,000 nmi (11,000 km) at 12 kn (22 km/h; 14 mph)
- Complement: 15 officers, 198 men
- Armament: 3 × 3"/50 caliber guns; 1 × quad 1.1"/75 caliber gun; 8 × single 20 mm guns; 1 × triple 21 inch (533 mm) torpedo tubes; 1 × Hedgehog anti-submarine mortar; 8 × K-gun depth charge projectors; 2 × depth charge tracks

USS Frybarger (DE/DEC-705) was a Buckley-class destroyer escort in service with the United States Navy from 1944 to 1947 and from 1950 to 1957. She was scrapped in 1973.

== History ==
Frybarger was launched on 25 January 1944 at the Defoe Shipbuilding Company, in Bay City, Michigan, sponsored by Miss Caroljean and Clarabelle Frybarger, both sisters of PFC Frybarger. The ship was commissioned on 18 May 1944.

=== World War II, 1944–1945 ===
After two convoy escort voyages to Bizerte made between 25 July and 18 November 1944, Frybarger received new equipment and trained for Pacific duty. She arrived at Manus on 23 January 1945, and began escort duty to and in the Philippines until 30 August. Ports of call for her during this assignment included the Carolines; Lingayen Gulf, Manila, and Zamboanga in the Philippines; Hollandia; and on one voyage, Okinawa.

=== Post-war activities, 1945–1946 ===
Frybarger arrived at Buckner Bay, Okinawa, on 3 September 1945 for duty escorting transports carrying troops to occupation duty in Korea and China until sailing for home on 8 November. She arrived at Boston, Massachusetts, on 15 December, and at Green Cove Springs, Florida, on 20 January 1946. There she was decommissioned and placed in reserve on 30 June 1947.

=== Control escort vessel, 1950–1954 ===
Equipped with additional communication gear during her reactivation, Frybarger was reclassified DEC-705 on 13 September 1950 and recommissioned 6 October 1950 as a control escort vessel. After training in the Caribbean, she arrived at her home port, San Diego, on 11 March 1951 which included service as vessel for landing ships and craft in amphibious exercises, and training for students of the Fleet Sonar School, San Diego.

Between 6 March and 2 October 1952, Frybarger made a tour of duty with the 7th Fleet in the Far East, serving on barrier patrol off Okinawa, in amphibious exercises off Japan, training with submarines, and visiting Japanese ports. A second Far Eastern deployment between 1 September 1953 and 5 June 1954 found Frybarger concentrating on amphibious exercises with marines on the beaches of Okinawa; Inchon, Korea; Chigasaki, Japan; and in the Bonins.

=== Decommissioning and fate ===
Frybarger was decommissioned for a second time at San Diego on 9 December 1954, and placed in reserve. She was reclassified back to DE-705 on 27 December 1957. She was struck from the Naval Vessel Register on 1 December 1972, sold on 27 November 1973, and broken up for scrap.

== Namesake ==
Raymond Frybarger Jr. was born on 22 April 1923 in Toledo, Ohio. He enlisted in the Marine Corps Reserve on 22 April 1940. Private First Class Frybarger was killed in action on Guadalcanal during the Battle of Edson's Ridge. For his heroism in exposing himself to enemy fire in an attack on Henderson Field and maintaining effective rifle fire until killed, he was posthumously awarded the Navy Cross.
