= USS Claxton (DD-571) =

Fletcher-class destroyer

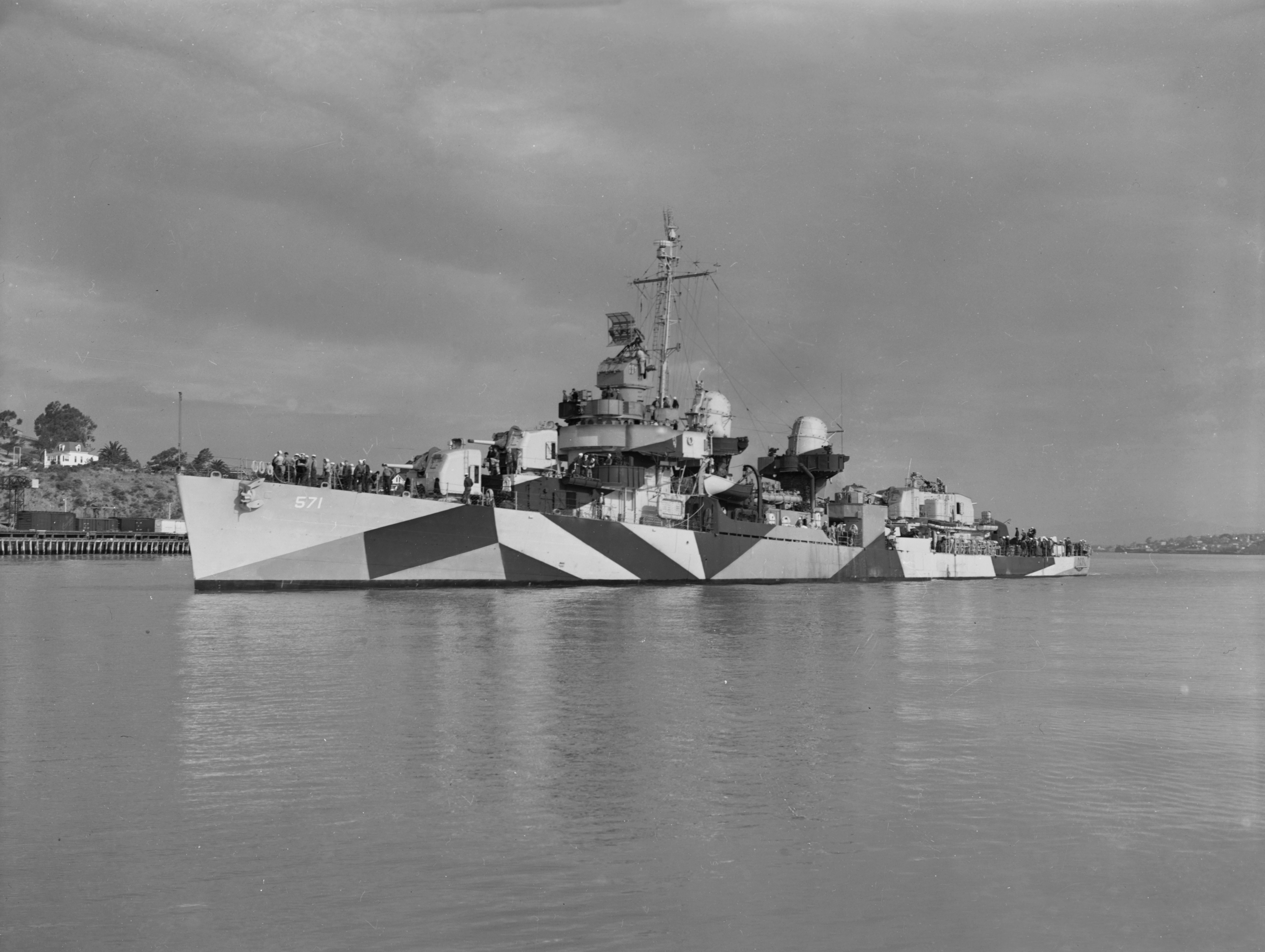
- USS Claxton in a Dazzle camouflage paint scheme

History

United States
- Name: USS Claxton
- Namesake: Thomas Claxton
- Builder: Consolidated Steel Corporation, Orange, Texas
- Laid down: 25 June 1941
- Launched: 1 April 1942
- Commissioned: 8 December 1942
- Decommissioned: 18 April 1946
- Stricken: 1 October 1974
- Identification: DD-571
- Fate: Transferred to West German Navy, 16 December 1959

West Germany
- Name: Zerstörer 4
- Acquired: 16 December 1959
- Stricken: 1981
- Identification: D178
- Fate: Transferred to Greece as spares donor ship

General characteristics
- Class & type: Fletcher-class destroyer; Zerstörer 1-class destroyer
- Displacement: 2,050 long tons (2,080 t)
- Length: 376 ft 6 in (114.76 m)
- Beam: 39 ft 8 in (12.09 m)
- Draft: 17 ft 9 in (5.41 m)
- Propulsion: 60,000 shp (45 MW) ; 2 propellers
- Speed: 35 knots (65 km/h; 40 mph)
- Range: 6,500 nmi (12,000 km; 7,500 mi) at 15 knots (28 km/h; 17 mph)
- Complement: 329
- Armament: 5 × single Mk 12 5 in (127 mm)/38 guns; 5 × twin 40 mm (1.6 in) Bofors AA guns; 7 × single 20 mm (0.8 in) Oerlikon AA guns; 2 × quintuple 21 in (533 mm) torpedo tubes; 6 × single depth charge throwers; 2 × depth charge racks

USS Claxton (DD-571), a Fletcher-class destroyer, was the second ship of the United States Navy to be named for Thomas Claxton, born in Baltimore, Maryland.

Claxton was launched 1 April 1942 by Consolidated Steel Corporation, Orange, Texas; sponsored by Mrs. A. D. Bernhard; and commissioned 8 December 1942, Commander Herald F. Stout in command.

== History ==
In March 1943 Claxton patrolled briefly in Casco Bay, Maine, awaiting the possible sortie of German battleship Tirpitz from Norwegian waters. After one convoy escort assignment to Casablanca, she sailed from Charleston, South Carolina, 17 May to join the Pacific Fleet.

After training at Nouméa and Espiritu Santo from 12 June 1943, Claxton covered the landings at Rendova between 27 June and 25 July, then joined Destroyer Squadron 23 for a period of operations which were recognized with the Presidential Unit Citation. In the struggle for the Solomons, Claxton and her squadron patrolled to intercept enemy shipping, protected the passage of American troops and shipping, bombarded enemy bases, covered landings, and engaged Japanese surface and air forces.

In the Battle of Empress Augusta Bay on the night of 1/2 November 1943, Claxton, with four cruisers and seven other destroyers, fired her torpedoes in an attack which turned back a Japanese force of four cruisers and six destroyers sailing to attack transports off Bougainville, sinking two and damaging four of the enemy ships. Claxton towed Foote, one of five American ships damaged that night, into Purvis Bay, arriving 4 November.

On 25 November 1943, in the battle of Cape St. George, New Ireland, Claxton and four other destroyers intercepted a force of five Japanese destroyers, as the enemy ships sailed to evacuate aviation troops to Rabaul. Once more fighting in darkness, Claxton and the others achieved complete surprise in their torpedo attack, and followed with a running gun battle. In this classic destroyer action, three Japanese ships were sunk and a fourth damaged, with no injury to the American ships.

On 4 February 1944, while bombarding Sarime Plantation on Bougainville, Claxton was seriously damaged by an explosion aft, probably of two medium caliber shells. Despite her damage and 15 wounded, Claxton completed her mission with her three forward guns, then sailed for temporary aid at Purvis Bay and permanent repairs on the west coast. She returned to action in August 1944, and assigned to screen escort carriers, took part in the invasion of the Palaus in September. Sailing north for the invasion of the Philippines, the destroyer covered the operations of underwater demolition teams preparing the beaches, then gave screening and fire support during the landings on 20 October. In the phase of the Battle for Leyte Gulf known as the Battle of Surigao Strait on 24 and 25 October, Claxton screened the battle line in the surface action which virtually destroyed the Japanese southern force.

Continuing her patrol in Leyte Gulf to support the forces ashore, on 1 November 1944, Claxton suffered 5 dead, 23 wounded, and serious damage when a Japanese suicide plane crashed and exploded in the water alongside to starboard. The men used their mattresses to fill the 9-by-5-foot (2.7 by 1.5 m) hole. With all her after living spaces flooded, Claxton fought her own damage as she rescued 187 survivors of Abner Read, also a kamikaze's victim.

Repairs at Tacloban and Manus prepared Claxton for her return to action on fire support, patrol, and escort duty in the Lingayen Gulf landings from 9–18 January 1945. Continuing action in the Philippines, she conducted bombardments and covered landings, at various points on Luzon and Mindanao and in the Visayas through early May. On 16 May she arrived off Okinawa for duty as radar picket and fighter-director until the close of the war. On 6 June her guns drove off a flight of 12 kamikazes.

== Fate ==
Sailing from Okinawa 10 September 1945, Claxton reached Washington, D.C., 17 October for the ceremonial presentation of the Presidential Unit Citation 2 days later. After overhaul in New York, she was decommissioned and placed in reserve at Charleston, South Carolina, 18 April 1946. On 15 December 1959, she was loaned under the Mutual Assistance Program to the Federal Republic of Germany, with whom she served as Zerstörer 4 (D 178). In February 1981, she was transferred to the Hellenic Navy where she was ultimately dismantled for spare parts.

== Honors ==
In addition to her squadron's Presidential Unit Citation, Claxton received eight battle stars for World War II service.
