= Thomas Claxton =

Thomas Claxton (about 1790 – 17 October 1813) was an officer in the United States Navy during the War of 1812.

He was born around 1790 in Baltimore, Maryland. His father, also Thomas Claxton, was the Doorkeeper of the United States House of Representatives.

Claxton entered the Navy as a midshipman on 17 December 1810. He was mortally wounded in the War of 1812 after gallant service during the Battle of Lake Erie which took place 10 September 1813. He died of his wounds at Erie, Pennsylvania on 17 October 1813.

== Namesakes ==
Two United States Navy destroyers have been named after Claxton, the USS Claxton (DD-140) and the USS Claxton (DD-571).
