= Thomas Claxton Fidler =

British civil engineer (1841–1917)

- Born: 1841; Newbury, Berkshire, England
- Died: 29 June 1917 (aged 75–76)
- Occupation: Civil engineer
- Known for: 1887 book on bridge construction
- Spouse: Anne Talbot (m. 1873)

Thomas Claxton Fidler (1841 in Newbury, Berkshire – 29 June 1917) was a British civil engineer, noteworthy for his 1887 book on bridge construction.

== Career ==
As successor to Alfred Ewing, T. Claxton Fidler was appointed in 1891 a professor in the Chair of Engineering & Drawing at University College, Dundee. Ewing's Practical Treatise on Bridge-Construction (1887) went through five editions with the 3rd edition in 1901, 4th edition in 1909, and paperback 5th edition in 1924. The book was praised for its clarity and thoroughness. He retired as professor emeritus in 1909.

In retirement he lived in Ventnor, Isle of Wight.

Fidler was an invited speaker of the International Conference of Mathematicians in 1908 in Rome.

== Family ==
In Olney, Buckinghamshire on 11 March 1873, Fidler married Anne Talbot. The marriage produced several children.

== Selected publications ==
- A practical treatise on bridge-construction. London: C. Griffin & Co. 1887.
- Calculations in hydraulic engineering. Longmans's Civil Engineering Series. Vol. 1, 1898, vol. 2, 1902. London: Longmans, Green, & Co.
- Civil engineering. London: Methuen. 1905.
