= Thomas Claxton (doorkeeper) =

- Born: unknown Connecticut
- Died: December 8, 1821; Hartford, Connecticut
- Occupation: Doorkeeper of the United States House of Representatives

Thomas Claxton (died 1821) was the Doorkeeper of the United States House of Representatives from 1795 to 1821. While being Doorkeeper, Claxton was also the "Agent for furnishing the President's House" for both John Adams and Thomas Jefferson.

== Background ==
Thomas Claxton was born in the state of Connecticut in an unknown year. Claxton was a printer by trade and a former officer in the Continental Army. In 1781, Claxton served in the 4th Regiment of the Philadelphia Militia.

He served as Assistant Doorkeeper of the United States House of Representatives from 1789 to 1789. On December 7, 1795, he was appointed as Doorkeeper of the United States House of Representatives by the 4th United States Congress. He was reappointed each congressional session until the 16th United States Congress, which he died shortly after.

Under the presidency of John Adams and the presidency of Thomas Jefferson, Claxton served as the "Agent for furnishing the President's House from 1797 to 1809.

According to historian Marie Kimball, Thomas Claxton was "Jefferson's man-Friday in [the] task of furnishing" the executive mansion.

Before Jefferson's second term as president, Claxton worked with Maryland Congressman Joseph Hopper Nicholson to increase the initial appropriations for the President's House by $14,000. Nicholson was an influential Democratic-Republican and an ally of Jefferson. Claxton reported his success to Jefferson and offered himself as the purchasing agent for new assets. As his second term drew to a close, Jefferson praised Claxton for is work in securing pleasure and wrote "I say with pleasure that the integrity, diligence & economy with which you have employed the funds destined to that object, have given me perfect satisfaction."

Thomas Claxton lived in Philadelphia, Baltimore, Hartford, and the District of Columbia throughout his life. He had a son also named Thomas Claxton who served in the United States Navy during the War of 1812.

Thomas Claxton died on December 8, 1821, in Hartford, Connecticut.

== Years served as Doorkeeper ==
Congress (years)	Date elected
4th (1795–97)	December 7, 1795
5th (1797–99)	May 15, 1797
6th (1799-1801)	December 2, 1799
7th (1801–03)	December 7, 1801
8th (1803–05)	October 17, 1803
9th (1805–07)	December 2, 1805
10th (1807–09)	October 27, 1807
11th (1809–11)	May 22, 1809
12th (1811–13)	November 4, 1811
13th (1813–15)	May 24, 1813
14th (1815–17)	December 4, 1815
15th (1817–19)	December 1, 1817
16th (1819–21)	December 6, 1819
