= USS McMorris =

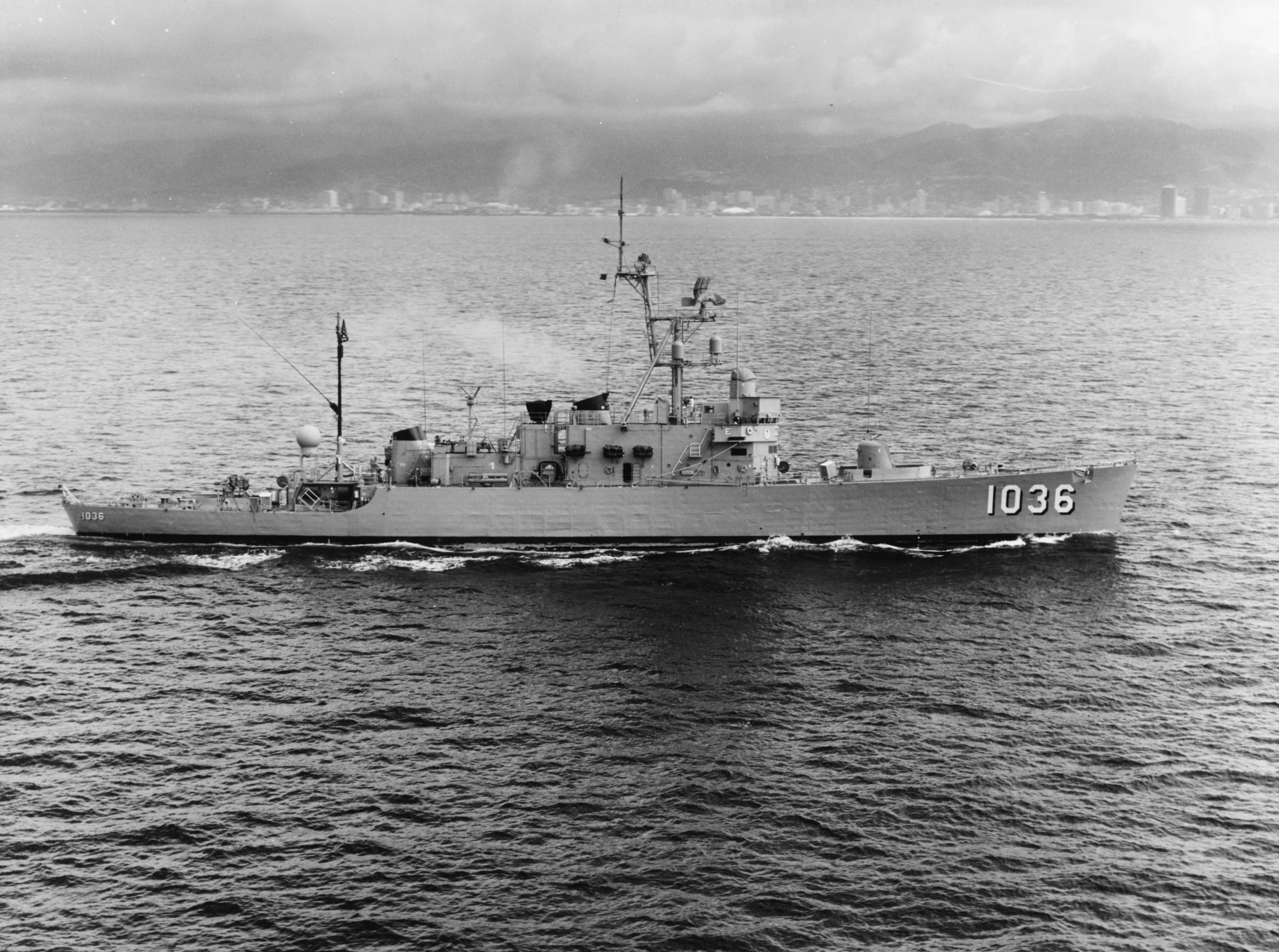
- USS McMorris in 1972

History

United States
- Name: USS McMorris
- Namesake: Charles McMorris
- Builder: Avondale Marine Ways, Avondale, Louisiana
- Launched: 26 May 1959
- Commissioned: 4 March 1960
- Stricken: 16 December 1974
- Identification: Hull number: DE-1036
- Fate: Sold to Indonesia, December 1974

Indonesia
- Name: KRI Ngurah Rai
- Namesake: I Gusti Ngurah Rai
- Acquired: 1 December 1974
- Decommissioned: 2 January 2003
- Identification: Pennant number: 344
- Status: Decommissioned; awaiting disposal

General characteristics
- Type: Destroyer escort
- Displacement: 1,314 long tons (1,335 t) standard; 1,970 long tons (2,000 t) full load
- Length: 312 ft (95 m)
- Beam: 38 ft 10 in (11.84 m)
- Draft: 12 ft 1 in (3.68 m)
- Propulsion: 4 × Fairbanks-Morse 38ND8 Diesels; 9,240 shp; 7,000 bhp; 1 shaft
- Speed: 20–22 knots (37–41 km/h)
- Range: 7,000 nmi (13,000 km) at 12 kn (22 km/h)
- Complement: 171 total: 12 Officers; 159 enlisted men
- Electronic warfare & decoys: AN/SPS-6E-2D air search radar
- Armament: 2 × 3-inch/50-caliber guns (2 × 1); 6 × 12.75 in (324 mm) Mk.32 torpedo tubes (2 × 3); 2 × Hedgehog anti-submarine mortar

USS McMorris (DE-1036) was a Claud Jones-class destroyer escort in service with the United States Navy from 1960 to 1974. It was then sold to Indonesia and served as Ngurah Rai until 2003.

== United States Navy ==
USS McMorris (DE-1036) was named after Vice Admiral Charles McMorris (1890–1952). She was laid down 15 November 1958 by the American Ship Building Company, Lorain, Ohio (USA) and launched on 26 May 1959 by Avondale Shipyard, Westwego, Louisiana, sponsored by Mrs. McMorris, widow of Vice Adm. McMorris. The ship was commissioned on 4 March 1960 at Charleston, South Carolina.

After fitting out on the East Coast of the United States, McMorris proceeded to Naval Station San Diego where she reported to the Cruiser Destroyer Force, Pacific Fleet. In April 1961, she headed west for her first six-month deployment in the Far East. Beginning and ending that tour on the Taiwan Straits Patrol, she also served with the 7th Fleet's anti-submarine warfare (ASW) group, as station ship at Hong Kong and as goodwill ship for people-to-people visits to Japanese cities on the Sea of Japan. Employed similarly on her next three Western Pacific tours, her schedule, as well as her homeport, was changed in 1965. On 17 May she departed Pearl Harbor, her home port since January, for duty off Vietnam. As flagship of Commander Escort Squadron 5 (CortRon 5), she participated in Operation Market Time, the search and surveillance operation with the Republic of Vietnam Navy's Junk Force. During that tour she became the first destroyer escort to engage in naval gunfire support in the Vietnamese combat zone.

She returned to Hawaii in late August and was assigned to Task Force 92, and became flagship for CortRon 11, and was designated flagship for CortRon 7 during convoy operations. McMorris followed her South China Sea operations with two cruises, one to the North Pacific and one to the South Pacific, completing both before the end of the year.

During ASW exercises off Hawaii on 31 January 1967, McMorris was involved in a serious collision with the gasoline tanker USS Tombigbee (AOG-11). Two men were killed and seven men were injured aboard the McMorris. The bow of the Tombigbee struck McMorris on the port side at frame 87 during maneuvering at night. The ship side was opened at the waterline from frame 84 to frame 93 extending underwater to a width of 90 cm, 2.40 m from the keel. Topside, the step masthead was sheared off and broken, four rooms on the main deck were destroyed. All communications and all propulsion was lost. McMorris was then towed to the Pearl Harbor Naval Shipyard and repaired.

Following a deployment to the Indian Ocean in 1968–1969, where it shadowed the Zond 5 probe in September 1968, the Claud Jones class formed the newly created CortRon 1 and deployed to the Western Pacific in 1969–1970 and 1970–1971. McMorris took part in various special operations for which she received the Meritorious Unit Commendation. CortRon 1 also earned the Battle "E" award in 1971. During her deployment in 1970–1971, McMorris participated in a recovery operation of a Corona satellite capsule. She also observed the missile launch of a Soviet guided missile destroyer.

During an overhaul at the Pearl Harbor Naval Shipyard in 1971, McMorris received a complete redesign of the upper bridge works. Additional deck spaces were added and a satellite communications antenna was mounted just aft of the second stack. She resumed her Market Time duties in 1972 and also visited Australia and New Zealand. In 1973, she participated in exercise LONGEX-73, a joint exercise of the navies of the Australia, the Netherlands, New Zealand, the United Kingdom and the United States.

Due to their small size and armament, the Claud Jones-class ships were not seen as effective anti-submarine vessels and were retired after only about 15 years' service. Therefore, McMorris was decommissioned at Pearl Harbor on 16 December 1974.

== Indonesian Navy ==
The four Claud Jones-class ships were sold to Indonesia in 1974. McMorris was renamed KRI Ngurah Rai (D-3), after an Indonesian National Hero Colonel I Gusti Ngurah Rai. Her hull number was changed to 344 in 1982 and she was finally decommissioned on 2 January 2003.
