= Navy Cross =

U.S. Naval Service medal for valor

- Type: Military medal Service medal
- Awarded for: Extraordinary heroism in combat
- Presented by: United States Department of the Navy
- Eligibility: Marines and naval sailors of the United States
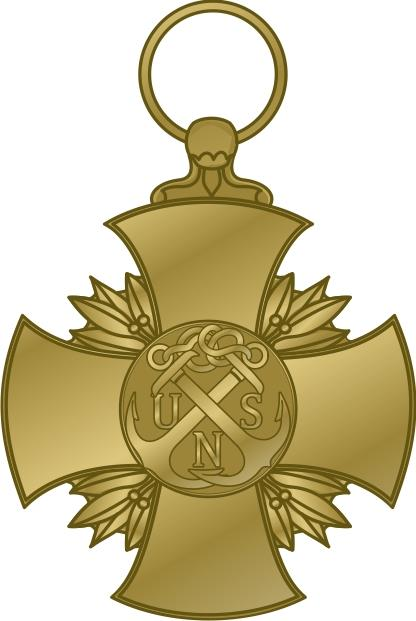
- Reverse
- Status: Currently awarded
- Established: Act of Congress (Public Law 65-253), approved on February 4, 1919.
- First award: 1919

Highlights
- Total: c. 5,400 (as of December 2017)
- Service ribbon

Precedence
- Next (higher): Medal of Honor
- Equivalent: Army: Distinguished Service Cross; Air and Space Forces: Air Force Cross; Coast Guard: Coast Guard Cross
- Next (lower): Department of Defense: Defense Distinguished Service Medal; Department of Homeland Security: Homeland Security Distinguished Service Medal

The Navy Cross is the United States naval services' second-highest military decoration awarded for sailors and marines who distinguish themselves for extraordinary heroism in combat with an armed enemy force. The medal is equivalent to the Distinguished Service Cross of the United States Army, the Air Force Cross of the United States Air Force and Space Force, and the Coast Guard Cross of the United States Coast Guard; collectively, these awards are known as the "service crosses".

The Navy Cross is bestowed by the secretary of the Navy and may also be awarded to members of the other armed services, and to foreign military personnel while serving with the U.S. naval services. The Navy Cross was established by Act of Congress (Public Law 65-253) and approved on February 4, 1919.

== History ==
The Navy Cross was instituted in part due to the entrance of the United States into World War I. Many European nations had the custom of decorating heroes from other nations, but the Medal of Honor was the sole U.S. award for valor at the time. The Army instituted the Distinguished Service Cross and Distinguished Service Medal in 1918, while the Navy followed suit in 1919, retroactive to 6 April 1917. Originally, the Navy Cross was lower in precedence than the Medal of Honor and the Navy Distinguished Service Medal, because it was awarded for both combat heroism and for "other distinguished service". Congress revised this on 7 August 1942, making the Navy Cross a combat-only decoration that follows the Medal of Honor in order of precedence. Since the medal was established, it has been awarded more than 6,300 times. It was designed by James Earle Fraser. Since the September 11 attacks the Navy Cross has been awarded 47 times, with two having the name of the recipient held in secret. One of those secret awardings was due to Marine Gunnery Sergeant Tate Jolly's actions during the 2012 Benghazi attack.

== Criteria ==
The Navy Cross may be awarded to any member of the U.S. Armed Forces while serving with the Navy, Marine Corps, or Coast Guard (when a part of the Department of the Navy) who distinguishes themselves in action by extraordinary heroism not justifying an award of the Medal of Honor. The action must take place under one of three circumstances:

1. In combat action while engaged against an enemy of the United States; or,
2. In combat action while engaged in military operations involving conflict with an opposing foreign force; or,
3. In combat action while serving with friendly foreign forces, who are engaged in armed conflict in which the United States is not a belligerent party.

The act(s) to be commended must be performed in the presence of great danger, or at great personal risk, and must be performed in such a manner as to render the individual's action(s) highly conspicuous among others of equal grade, rate, experience, or position of responsibility. An accumulation of minor acts of heroism does not justify an award of the Navy Cross.

As originally authorized, the Navy Cross could be awarded for distinguished non-combat acts, but legislation of 7 August 1942 limited the award to acts of combat heroism. Past Navy Cross awards for merit, such as to 9th Chief of Naval Operations Fleet Admiral Ernest King, were unaffected by the change in criteria.

== Wear ==
The Navy Cross originally was the Navy's third-highest decoration, after the Medal of Honor and the Navy Distinguished Service Medal. On 7 August 1942, Congress revised the order of precedence, placing the Navy Cross above the Distinguished Service Medal in precedence. Since that time, the Navy Cross has been worn after the Medal of Honor and before all other awards.

Additional awards of the Navy Cross are denoted by gold or silver 5/16 inch stars affixed to the suspension and service ribbon of the medal. A gold star would be issued for each of the second through fifth awards, to be replaced by a silver star which would indicate a sixth award. To date no one has received more than five awards.

== Description ==
Medal

Obverse: The medal is a modified cross pattée one and a half inches wide. The ends of its arms are rounded whereas a conventional cross patée has arms that are straight on the end. There are four laurel leaves with berries in each of the re-entrant arms of the cross. In the center of the cross, a sailing vessel is depicted on waves, sailing to the viewer's left.

Reverse: In the center of the medal, a bronze cross pattée, one and a half inches wide, are crossed anchors from the pre-1850 period, with cables attached. The letters USN are evident amid the anchors.

The earliest version of the Navy Cross (1919–1928) featured a more narrow strip of white, while the so-called "Black Widow" medals awarded from 1941 to 1942 were notable for the dark color due to over-anodized finish. The medal is similar in appearance to the British Distinguished Service Cross.

Service Ribbon

The service ribbon is navy blue with a center stripe of white identical to the suspension ribbon of the medal.

== Symbolism ==
The vessel depicted on the obverse is a symbolic caravel of the type used between 1480 and 1500. Designer James Earle Fraser selected the caravel because it was a symbol often used by the Naval Academy and because it represented both naval service and the tradition of the sea. The laurel leaves with berries refer to achievement.

On the service ribbon, the blue alludes to naval service; the white represents the purity of selflessness.

== Recipients ==
=== Recipients of Five Navy Crosses ===
Only two individuals have achieved the distinction of five Navy Crosses, representing the pinnacle of sustained combat leadership.

- Roy M. Davenport (USN): Submarine Commander of the USS Haddock. He remains the only sailor to earn five Navy Crosses.
- Lewis B. "Chesty" Puller (USMC): Marine infantry leader during World War II and the Korean War. He is the most decorated Marine in U.S. history.

=== Recipients of Four Navy Crosses ===
- Slade Cutter (USN): Submarine Commander noted for aggressive patrols in the Pacific theater.
- Samuel D. Dealey (USN): Commanding officer of the USS Harder; also a posthumous Medal of Honor recipient.
- Glynn R. Donaho (USN): Key figure in the Pacific submarine campaign.
- Eugene B. Fluckey (USN): Commander of the USS Barb; also a Medal of Honor recipient.
- Antone R. Gallaher (USN)
- Harold R. Mazza (USN): Only Naval aviator to receive four Navy Crosses. One of them for contributing to the sinking of the Japanese battleship Yamato in April 1945.
- Dudley W. Morton (USN): Known as "Mush" Morton, commander of the USS Wahoo.

=== Notable Multiple Recipients (3 or more Navy Crosses) ===
==== Submarine Service ====
- Bernard A. Clarey: Recognized for three distinct patrols of extraordinary heroism.
- Richard H. O’Kane: Commander of the USS Tang; Medal of Honor recipient.
- William H. Brockman Jr.: Awarded for his leadership during the Battle of Midway and subsequent patrols.
- Creed Burlingame: Commander of the USS Silversides during three highly successful war patrols.
- Frank Wesley Fenno Jr.: Awarded three Navy Crosses, including for his command of the USS Trout.

==== Naval Aviation ====
- Noel A. M. Gayler: One of the few pilots to earn three Navy Crosses for aerial victories.
- Arthur R. Hawkins: A prolific Navy Ace who earned three Navy Crosses.
- Swede Vejtasa: Stanley Winfield Vejtasa, earned three Navy Crosses in the Pacific theater.
- Samuel Adams: Combat pilot awarded three Navy Crosses for Midway and Coral Sea.
- Herbert N. Houck: Commander of Air Group 9, recognized for strikes on Japanese naval forces.
- Cornelius N. Nooy: One of the highest-scoring aces in the history of the Navy.
- Marc A. Mitscher: Admiral and pioneer of naval aviation.

==== Surface Warfare and Marine Corps ====
- Evans F. Carlson: Leader of the famed "Carlson's Raiders."
- William A. Lee: A key figure in the Marine Corps, recognized for heroism in multiple actions.
- Harold C. Roberts: Distinguished Marine officer across three conflicts.
- Frederick C. Sherman: Admiral and carrier commander at the Battle of the Coral Sea.

== Notable recipients ==
=== United States Navy ===
- Laurence A. Abercrombie (three awards)
- Samuel Adams (naval officer) (three awards)
- James Thomas Alexander, 35th Naval Governor of Guam
- Adelbert Althouse, 27th and 29th Naval Governor of Guam
- Jackson D. Arnold
- Barry K. Atkins
- William B. Ault
- Bernard L. Austin, (two awards)
- John Arnold Austin, namesake of USS Austin (DE-15)
- Matthew Axelson
- Edward L. Beach Jr.
- Richard Halsey Best
- Claude C. Bloch
- John Bradley
- William F. Bringle
- Robert P. Briscoe
- William H. Brockman Jr. (three awards)
- Phil H. Bucklew (two awards)
- John D. Bulkeley (also a Medal of Honor (MOH) and 2 Army Distinguished Service Crosses (DSC)s)
- William O. Burch (three awards)
- Arleigh A. Burke
- Creed Burlingame (3 awards)
- Richard E. Byrd (also an MOH)
- Robert Carney
- Charles P. Cecil (two awards), namesake of USS Charles P. Cecil (DD-835)
- Gordon Pai'ea Chung-Hoon
- Bernard A. Clarey (three awards)
- George Thomas Coker
- James J. Connell
- Richard L. Conolly
- Walter W. Coolbaugh, namesake of USS Coolbaugh (DE-217)
- George Franklin Cooper
- Ralph W. Cousins
- William P. Cronan, 19th Naval Governor of Guam
- William Michael Crose, 7th Governor of American Samoa
- Randy "Duke" Cunningham
- Winfield Scott Cunningham
- Maurice E. Curts
- Slade Cutter (four awards)
- Roy M. Davenport (five awards)
- Albert David (two awards and an MOH)
- Arthur C. Davis, (three awards)
- Samuel David Dealey (four awards, an Army DSC and an MOH)
- James Charles Dempsey, (two awards)
- Dieter Dengler
- Clarence E. Dickinson, (three awards)
- Danny Dietz
- Glynn R. "Donc" Donaho (four awards)
- Mark L. Donald
- William P. Driscoll
- Thomas M. Dykers, (two awards)
- Laurance T. DuBose, (three awards)
- Thomas Eadie (two awards and an MOH)
- Henry E. Eccles
- Richard S. Edwards
- Joseph F. Enright
- Harry D. Felt
- William Charles Fitzgerald namesake of USS Fitzgerald (DDG-62)
- Eugene B. Fluckey (four awards and an MOH)
- Luis Fonseca
- James Shepherd Freeman
- Neldon Theo French namesake of USS French (DE-367)
- Ignatius J. Galantin
- William Gilmer, 22nd and 24th Naval Governor of Guam
- George William Grider, U.S. Representative to the 89th Congress
- Robert Halperin
- William Halsey Jr. one of four WWII Fleet Admirals and namesake of USS Halsey (CG-23) and USS Halsey (DDG-97)
- Robert W. Hayler (three awards), namesake of USS Hayler (DD-997)
- Arthur Ray Hawkins (three awards)
- Henry Kent Hewitt (two awards)
- Lenah H. Sutcliffe Higbee, (first female recipient), namesake of USS Higbee (DD-806) and USS Lenah Sutcliffe Higbee (DDG-123)
- William A. Hodgman, 23rd Naval Governor of Guam
- Gilbert C. Hoover, (three awards)
- John Howard Hoover
- Frederick J. Horne
- John Howard
- Royal E. Ingersoll
- Jonas H. Ingram (also an MOH)
- Richard H. Jackson
- Edward C. Kalbfus
- Draper Kauffman (two awards)
- Charles Keating IV
- Joseph P. Kennedy Jr. (posthumously, member of the Kennedy family and brother of the 35th U.S. President
- Ira C. Kepford (two awards)
- Ernest J. King, 9th Chief of Naval Operations, one of four WWII Fleet admirals and namesake of USS King (DDG-41)
- Thomas B. Klakring (three awards)
- Norman Jack "Dusty" Kleiss
- Hugo W. Koehler
- Edmond Konrad (two awards)
- George Landenberger, 23rd Governor of American Samoa
- John H. Lang
- Harris Laning
- William D. Leahy one of four WWII Fleet Admirals and namesake of USS Leahy (DLG-16)
- Willis A. Lee
- Gatewood Lincoln, 22nd Governor of American Samoa
- Elliott Loughlin (two awards)
- Marcus Luttrell
- Harold John Mack
- John S. McCain Sr.
- David McCampbell (also an MOH)
- Benjamin McCandlish, 36th Naval Governor of Guam
- John McCloy (also two MOH)
- C. Wade McClusky
- Donald L. McFaul
- Charles H. McMorris, namesake of USS McMorris (DE-1036)
- Luke McNamee, 10th and 12th Naval Governor of Guam, and 21st Director of the Office of Naval Intelligence
- Doris "Dorie" Miller (first African American recipient), namesake of USS Miller (FF-1091) and USS Doris Miller (CVN-81)
- Hugh B. Miller (two awards)
- Marc Mitscher (three awards)
- John Anderson Moore (three awards)
- Dudley W. "Mush" Morton, (four awards)
- Jesse W. Naul Jr. (also two Distinguished Flying Crosses (DFC)s)
- Louis McCoy Nulton
- Edward "Butch" O'Hare (also an MOH)
- Richard H. "Dick" O'Kane, (three awards and an MOH)
- Chick Parsons (two awards)
- Edwin Taylor Pollock
- John Martin Poyer, 12th Governor of American Samoa
- Lawson P. Ramage (two awards and an MOH)
- DeWitt Clinton Ramsey
- Joseph M. Reeves
- George S. Rentz, namesake of USS Rentz (FFG-46)
- Robert H. Rice (two awards)
- Frederick Lois Riefkohl
- Samuel B. Roberts
- Samuel Robison
- Dean Rockwell
- Maurice H. Rindskopf
- Tony F. Schneider, (two awards)
- Frank Herman Schofield
- David F. Sellers
- Benedict J. Semmes Jr.
- Forrest P. Sherman
- Rodger W. Simpson (two awards)
- Harold Page Smith
- Charles P. Snyder
- Raymond A. Spruance
- Giles C. Stedman
- George L. Street III (also an MOH)
- Felix Stump (two awards)
- John Thach (two awards)
- Robert J. Thomas
- John H. Towers
- Charles R. Train
- Richmond K. Turner
- Frank B. Upham
- Stanley W. Vejtasa, (three awards) also a USN fighter ace
- Corydon M. Wassell
- Ivan Wettengel, 25th Naval Governor of Guam
- James E. Williams, (also an MOH and two Silver Stars)
- Adam Williams (awarded as Adam William Berg)
- Royce Williams
- Clark H. Woodward (also two Distinguished Service Medals)
- Harry E. Yarnell

=== United States Marine Corps ===
- Robert H. Barrow (also an Army Distinguished Service Cross (DSC))
- John Basilone (also a Medal of Honor (MOH)), namesake of USS John Basilone (DDG-122)
- Victor Bleasdale (two awards and an Army DSC)
- John F. Bolt
- Gregory "Pappy" Boyington (also an MOH)
- Martin Brandtner (two awards)
- William Perry Brown Jr. (two awards)
- James Carson Breckinridge
- Marion Eugene Carl (two awards)
- Evans Carlson (three awards)
- Clifton B. Cates (also two Army DSCs)
- Brian Chontosh
- George R. Christmas
- Julius Cogswell, (also an Army DSC)
- Andrew F. Cook Jr., namesake of USS Cook (APD-130)
- Dallas H. Cook, namesake of USS Cook (APD-130)
- Alfred A. Cunningham
- William H. Dabney
- Joseph W. Dailey
- Daniel Daly (also two MOHs and an Army DSC)
- Ray Davis (also an MOH)
- James Devereux
- William A. Eddy
- Merritt A. Edson (two awards and an MOH)
- John W. Frederick Jr., (Vietnam War POW)
- Raymond Frybarger Jr., namesake of USS Frybarger
- Guy Gabaldon
- Patrick “Bob” Gallagher, namesake of USS Patrick Gallagher (DDG-127)
- Roy Geiger (two awards)
- Herman H. Hanneken (two awards and an MOH)
- Robert M. Hanson (also an MOH)
- Myron Harrington Jr.
- Leo D. Hermle (also an Army DSC)
- Thomas Holcomb
- Edward Buist Hope, (also an Army DSC)
- Henry L. Hulbert (also an MOH and an Army DSC)
- George Victor Jmaeff
- Bradley Kasal
- Treddy Ketcham
- Victor H. Krulak
- Henry Louis Larsen (two awards)
- Kurt Chew-Een Lee
- Justin LeHew
- William K. MacNulty
- Victor Maghakian
- William Edward Campbell March
- Karl Marlantes
- Pete McCloskey
- John McNulty (U.S. Marine Corps) (also an Army DSC)
- Angel Mendez
- Raymond Murray (two awards and an Army DSC)
- Peter J. Ortiz (two awards)
- Rafael Peralta
- Edwin A. Pollock
- Lewis "Chesty" Puller, (five awards and an Army DSC)
- Paul A. Putnam
- John H. Quick (also an MOH and an Army DSC)
- Kenneth L. Reusser (two awards)
- John Ripley
- Harold C. Roberts (three awards)
- Ford O. Rogers
- James Roosevelt
- William H. Rupertus
- John H. Russell Jr.
- Al Schmid
- Harry Schmidt
- Harold G. Schrier
- Lemuel C. Shepherd Jr. (also an Army DSC)
- Robert Taplett
- Alexander Vandegrift (also an MOH)
- Lew Walt (two awards)
- Jim Webb
- John H. Yancey (two awards)
- George Yarborough, namesake of USS Yarborough (DD-314)
- Jeremiah Workman

=== United States Army ===
- Stephen J. Chamberlin
- Rex T. Barber
- Thomas George Lanphier Jr.
- John W. Mitchell
- John U.D. Page

=== United States Coast Guard ===
- Frederick C. Billard
- Raymond Evans
- Elmer Fowler Stone
- Philip F. Roach
- Quentin R. Walsh

=== Non-U.S. recipients ===
- Nikolai Basistiy, Soviet Union (Soviet Navy, 1943)
- Gordon Bridson, New Zealand (Royal New Zealand Navy, 1943)
- Campbell Howard Buchanan, New Zealand (Royal New Zealand Navy, 1943)
- Ernesto Burzagli, Italy (Royal Italian Navy, 1919)
- Harold Farncomb, Australia (Royal Australian Navy, 1945)
- Israel Fisanovich, Soviet Union (Soviet Navy, 1944)
- Donald Gilbert Kennedy, New Zealand (British Solomon Islands Protectorate Defence Force, 1945)
- Seizō Kobayashi, Japan (Imperial Japanese Navy, 1921; 1925)
- Émile Henry Muselier, France (Free French Naval Forces, 1919)
- Peter Phipps, New Zealand (Royal New Zealand Navy, 1943)
- Ronald Niel Stuart, first Royal Navy officer to receive both the American Navy Cross and the British Victoria Cross (Royal Navy, 1927)
- Ivan Travkin, Soviet Union (Soviet Navy, 1942)
- Tran Van Bay, South Vietnam (Army of the Republic of Vietnam, 1967)
- Nguyen Van Kiet, South Vietnam (Republic of Vietnam Navy, 1972)
- Mikhail Vasilyevich Greshilov, Soviet Union (Soviet Navy, 1944)

== See also ==
- Military awards and decorations
  - Military awards of the United States Department of the Navy
- List of recipients of the Navy Cross in the Vietnam War
