= USS Coolbaugh =

Buckley-class destroyer escort

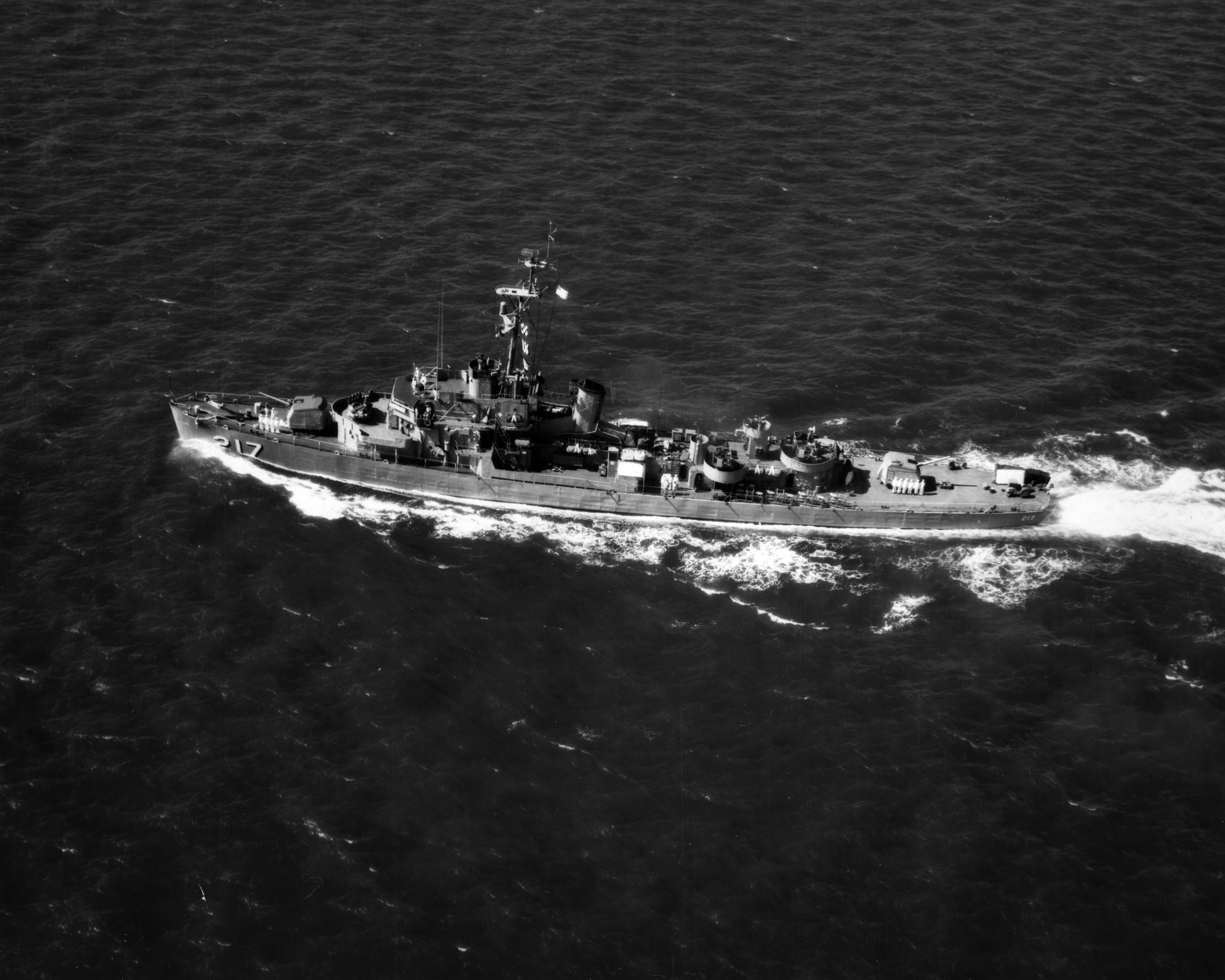

History

United States
- Name: USS Coolbaugh
- Namesake: Walter W. Coolbaugh
- Ordered: 1942
- Builder: Philadelphia Navy Yard, Philadelphia, Pennsylvania
- Laid down: 22 February 1943
- Launched: 29 May 1943
- Commissioned: 15 October 1943
- Decommissioned: 21 February 1960
- Stricken: 1 July 1972
- Honors and awards: 3 battle stars (World War II)
- Fate: Sold for scrap, 17 August 1973

General characteristics
- Class & type: Buckley-class destroyer escort
- Displacement: 1,400 long tons (1,422 t) standard; 1,740 long tons (1,768 t) full load
- Length: 306 ft (93 m)
- Beam: 37 ft (11 m)
- Draft: 9 ft 6 in (2.90 m) standard; 11 ft 3 in (3.43 m) full load
- Propulsion: 2 × boilers; General Electric turbo-electric drive; 12,000 shp (8.9 MW); 2 × solid manganese-bronze 3,600 lb (1,600 kg) 3-bladed propellers, 8 ft 6 in (2.59 m) diameter, 7 ft 7 in (2.31 m) pitch; 2 × rudders; 359 tons fuel oil
- Speed: 23 knots (43 km/h; 26 mph)
- Range: 3,700 nmi (6,900 km) at 15 kn (28 km/h; 17 mph); 6,000 nmi (11,000 km) at 12 kn (22 km/h; 14 mph)
- Complement: 15 officers, 198 men
- Armament: 3 × 3"/50 caliber guns; 1 × quad 1.1"/75 caliber gun; 8 × single 20 mm guns; 1 × triple 21-inch (533 mm) torpedo tubes; 1 × Hedgehog anti-submarine mortar; 8 × K-gun depth charge projectors; 2 × depth charge tracks

USS Coolbaugh (DE-217) was a Buckley-class destroyer escort in service with the United States Navy from 1943 to 1960. She was scrapped in 1973.

The ship was named for Walter Wesley Coolbaugh, a naval aviator who received the Navy Cross after the Battle of the Coral Sea, and had been killed in an aircraft accident in December 1942.

== History ==
USS Coolbaugh was launched 29 May 1943 by Philadelphia Navy Yard; sponsored by Mrs. A. Coolbaugh; and commissioned 15 October 1943.

=== World War II, 1943–1945 ===
After escorting merchantmen across the Pacific, Coolbaugh reached Efate 8 February 1944, and at once began to serve on patrol and as escort in the Solomons. She joined in the invasion of Emirau Island from 9 to 16 April, and on several occasions voyaged to Manus, Emirau, and Eniwetok on escort duty.

Coolbaugh arrived at Manus 10 October 1944 to join the 7th Fleet, and put to sea two days later for pre-invasion air strikes on Leyte which began on 18 October. She guarded the escort carriers as they covered the landings and as they gallantly defied the efforts of a strong Japanese surface force to break up the landings in the Battle off Samar, phase of the decisive Battle of Leyte Gulf on 25 October, and next day saved 91 men thrown overboard when Suwanee (CVE-27) was damaged by kamikaze. Coolbaugh escorted Suwanee to safety at Manus.

Between 19 and 27 November 1944, Coolbaugh screened escort carriers as they provided air cover for convoys supplying forces in Leyte Gulf, and then sailed to New Guinea to prepare for the Lingayen assault. Through January and February 1945, she screened transports carrying reinforcements to Lingayen Gulf, serving on patrol within the gulf during each such voyage. Between 28 February and 4 March, she sailed from Ulithi to Iwo Jima to carry away men who had made the original landings, upon their relief by other forces. She returned to Iwo Jima to patrol off the island until 27 March, when she cleared for Pearl Harbor.

Coolbaugh provided escort and other services to ships training in the Hawaiian Islands until 4 September 1945, when she arrived at San Francisco for overhaul and training on the west coast.

=== Post-war operations, 1946–1960 ===
Early in January 1946, she arrived at Newport, Rhode Island, her assigned homeport, and began local operations in submarine training and other exercises. On 25 January she aided in providing electric power for Block Island, where the powerhouse had been damaged in a fire. Continuing her coastwise and Caribbean operations, she acted as plane guard during anti-submarine exercises, was schoolship for the Fleet Sonar School at Key West, Florida, and during the summer of 1954 called at ports in Ireland and England on a midshipman training cruise. Summer 1956 found her again on this duty.

Assigned permanently to the Fleet Sonar School at Key West on 22 August 1957, Coolbaugh thereafter operated primarily in Florida waters, often cruising with members of the Naval Reserve on board for training. She was decommissioned 21 February 1960 at Saint Petersburg, Florida, and placed in service until 26 May, when she was placed out of service in reserve.

== Awards ==
Coolbaugh received three battle stars for World War II service.
