= General Livingston =

General Livingston may refer to:

- Guy Livingston (British Army officer) (1881–1950), British Army and Royal Air Force brigadier general
- James Livingston, 1st Earl of Callendar (c. 1590s–1674), Scottish Royalist lieutenant general
- James E. Livingston (1940-), U.S. Marine Corps major general
- Lawrence H. Livingston (1940-), U.S. Marine Corps major general

== See also ==
- Thomas Livingstone, 1st Viscount Teviot (c. 1651–1711), Dutch Republic lieutenant general
