= James Ashby (corpsman) =

United States Navy hospital corpsman (1944–1967)

James Wesley Ashby
- Born: April 2, 1944; Park Rapids, Minnesota, United States
- Died: June 1, 1967 (aged 23); Quang Tri Province, Republic of Vietnam
- Military career
- Allegiance: United States
- Branch: United States Navy
- Service years: 1965–1967
- Rank: Hospitalman Third Class
- Units: Company L 3rd Battalion; 9th Marines; 3rd Marine Division (Rein.); Fleet Marine Force
- Conflicts: Vietnam War
- Awards: Navy Cross; Purple Heart; National Defense Service Medal; Vietnam Service Medal; Republic of Vietnam Campaign Medal

James Wesley Ashby (April 2, 1944 – June 1, 1967) was a United States Navy hospital corpsman who posthumously received the Navy Cross, the Navy’s second-highest decoration for valor in combat, for his actions during the Vietnam War. He was killed while rendering aid to wounded Marines under hostile fire.

== Early life and education ==
James Ashby was born in Park Rapids, Minnesota. He grew up in Hubbard County and attended public schools in the region. After graduation, he enlisted in the United States Navy and trained as a hospital corpsman. Corpsmen are enlisted medical specialists who often serve alongside Marine Corps units in combat, providing life-saving medical care.

== Military service ==
Ashby served with Company L, 3rd Battalion, 9th Marines, 3rd Marine Division, part of the Fleet Marine Force. His responsibilities as a hospitalman included battlefield triage, treating wounded Marines under fire, and stabilizing casualties for evacuation.

== Death and legacy ==
On June 1, 1967, while operating in Quang Tri Province in South Vietnam, Hospitalman Ashby repeatedly exposed himself to enemy fire in order to render medical assistance to wounded Marines. As described in his Navy Cross citation, he moved across open terrain multiple times to reach the wounded, shielding them with his body while treating their injuries. He was mortally wounded while attempting to aid another injured Marine.

His citation reads in part:

"Disregarding the intense enemy fire, he moved from man to man rendering aid to the wounded and reassuring them. When he saw a wounded Marine lying in an exposed area, he crawled forward through a hail of fire. While shielding the Marine with his own body and treating him, Hospitalman Ashby was mortally wounded. His exceptional courage, selfless devotion to duty, and inspiring efforts were in keeping with the highest traditions of the United States Naval Service."

Ashby's name is inscribed on Panel 21E, Line 25 of the Vietnam Veterans Memorial in Washington, D.C.

== See also ==
- List of Navy Cross recipients for the Vietnam War
- Hospital Corpsman
- 3rd Marine Division (United States)
- Vietnam Veterans Memorial
