= George Victor Jmaeff =

Canadian-American United States Marine Corps corporal

- Born: August 14, 1945; Oliver, British Columbia, Canada
- Died: March 1, 1969 (aged 23); Quảng Trị Province, South Vietnam
- Burial place: Osoyoos Lakeview Cemetery, Osoyoos, British Columbia
- Military career
- Allegiance: United States
- Branch: United States Marine Corps
- Service years: 1967–1969
- Rank: Corporal
- Nickname: "Canada"
- Units: Company C, 1st Battalion, 4th Marines, 3rd Marine Division
- Conflicts: Vietnam War
- Awards: Navy Cross; Bronze Star w/ Combat "V"; Purple Heart

George Victor Jmaeff (August 14, 1945 – March 1, 1969) was a United States Marine who posthumously received the Navy Cross for heroism and sacrifice of his own life in Vietnam in March 1969. He was one of the few Canadian Americans killed in action during the Vietnam War.

== Biography ==
=== Early life ===
George V. Jmaeff was born on August 14, 1945, in Oliver, British Columbia. Jmaeff grew up in Osoyoos, British Columbia, and enlisted in the United States Marine Corps in Seattle, Washington on November 28, 1967. He graduated at the top of his platoon in January 1968 from Marine Corps Recruit Depot San Diego, California.

=== Vietnam War ===
Jmaeff arrived in Vietnam in July 1968, where he was assigned to Charlie Company, 1st Battalion, 4th Marines, 3rd Marine Division in Quảng Trị Province. In October 1968, Jmaeff became acquainted with First Lieutenant Karl Marlantes, and the two Marines became close friends.

Jmaeff, standing 6-foot-4 and weighing more than 200 pounds, was highly regarded by the fellow Marines in his battalion. He was a few years older than most other enlisted men and carried a sawed-off M60 machine gun and its ammunition by himself. Jmaeff often took point of his platoon during a patrol. He was also one of just 12,000 Canadians to serve in the Vietnam War. He always carried a Canadian flag with him and was given the nickname "Canada" by his fellow Marines.

=== Death ===
On March 1, 1969, Company C attempted to take Hill 484. Corporal Jmaeff was the acting platoon sergeant and single-handedly assaulted and knocked-out numerous enemy emplacements despite being wounded by a hand grenade. While he was receiving medical aid, several other Marines were wounded by enemy mortar fire. Corporal Jmaeff left his position of safety to assist his fellow Marines when he was mortally wounded by a mortar round.

== Legacy ==
George V. Jmaeff was one of just over 130 Canadians killed during the Vietnam War. He was also posthumously awarded the Navy Cross for his actions on the day of his death, for which he was the only Canadian to be awarded the Navy Cross during the war. Jmaeff was buried in Osoyoos Lakeview Cemetery.

Four Marines who served alongside Jmaeff in Vietnam later named a child after him. Additionally, Jmaeff served as the inspiration for the character "Vancouver" in Karl Marlantes' Vietnam War novel Matterhorn.

== Navy Cross citation ==
Navy Cross Medal

The President of the United States

Takes Pride in Presenting The Navy Cross (Posthumously) To

George Victor Jmaeff

Corporal, United States Marine Corps

For Services as Set Forth in the Following Citation:

For extraordinary heroism while serving as a Platoon Sergeant with Company C, First Battalion, Fourth Marines, THIRD Marine Division (Reinforced), Fleet Marine Force, in the Republic of Vietnam on 1 March 1969. While Company C was attempting to seize Hill 484 north of the Rockpile, the lead platoon was pinned down by sniper fire and grenades from North Vietnamese Army soldiers who were acting as mortar forward observers and occupying well-fortified bunkers. Corporal Jmaeff, realizing that a frontal attack would produce excessive Marine casualties, directed three men to provide covering fire and, fully aware of the possible consequences of his daring action, initiated a lone assault on the hostile emplacements. Although seriously wounded by fragments of a hand grenade, he ignored his painful injuries and, resolutely obtaining his objective, destroyed the first enemy position. With the arrival of a reaction platoon, Corporal Jmaeff steadfastly refused medical treatment and continued to direct his men until ordered to receive medical aid. While his wounds were being tended, he observed several Marines injured during a new barrage of mortar fire and, tearing the intravenous fluid tube from his arm, unhesitatingly left his relatively secure location to aid his companions. As he dauntlessly struggled forward in a splendid display of valor, he was mortally wounded by the detonation of a mortar round. His heroic efforts and selfless concern for his fellowmen inspired all who observed him and were instrumental in his unit's securing the objective. By his courage, aggressive fighting spirit and unwavering devotion to duty, Corporal Jmaeff upheld the highest traditions of the Marine Corps and the United States Naval Service. He gallantly gave his life for his country.

== See also ==
- List of Navy Cross recipients for the Vietnam War
