= Matterhorn (novel) =

2009 novel by Karl Marlantes

Matterhorn: A Novel of the Vietnam War
- Author: Karl Marlantes
- Language: English
- Genre: War novel
- Publisher: El Leon Literary Arts / Atlantic Monthly Press
- Publication date: first edition (May 2009) / revised edition (March 2010)
- Publication place: United States
- Media type: Hardcover
- Pages: 600
- ISBN: 9780802119285
- OCLC: 501071580
- Followed by: What It Is Like To Go To War

Matterhorn: A Novel of the Vietnam War is a novel by American author and decorated Marine, Karl Marlantes. It was first published by El León Literary Arts in 2009 (in small quantity) and re-issued (and slightly edited) as a major publication of Atlantic Monthly Press on March 23, 2010.

Marlantes is a graduate of Yale University and a Rhodes Scholar. He is also a highly decorated Marine who served in Vietnam. He was awarded the Navy Cross, the Bronze Star, two Navy Commendation Medals for valor, two Purple Hearts, and ten Air Medals. He spent 30 years working on the novel, which was rejected for publication numerous times.

== Plot ==
The book is set in Vietnam in 1969 and draws from the experiences of Marlantes, who commanded a Marine rifle platoon. The novel looks at the hardships endured by the Marines who waged the war on behalf of America. It concerns the first three months in the service of second lieutenant Waino Mellas, a recent college graduate, and his compatriots in Bravo Company, most of whom are teenagers.

"Matterhorn" is the code name for a fire-support base in Quảng Trị Province, on the border between Laos and the Vietnamese DMZ. At the beginning of the novel, the Marines build the base, but later they are ordered to abandon it. The latter portions of the novel detail the struggles of Bravo Company to retake the base, which fell into enemy hands after it was abandoned. After they succeed, it is again abandoned, and the final portion of the book concerns the Marines of Bravo Company back at Vandegrift Command Base awaiting their redeployment while Mellas recovers from injuries sustained while retaking the Matterhorn base. He returns to the field as a hardened combat veteran with 90 days of service.

== Reception ==
Matterhorn received high praise from many critics. In The New York Times Sebastian Junger called it, "...one of the most profound and devastating novels ever to come out of Vietnam—or any war."

Sebastian Junger (The Perfect Storm) wrote: “In Marlantes’s hands, war is a confusing and rich world where some men die heroically, others die because of bureaucratic stupidity, and a few are deliberately killed by platoon-mates bearing a grudge.”

Matterhorn was Amazon's "Book of the Month" for March 2010, and debuted on the New York Times bestseller list in April 2010. It won the 2011 Colby Award, was ranked No. 7 Fiction in Time's Best Books of the Year (2010). It was one of The New York Times Notable Books of the Year (2010). It was an ALA Notable Book (2010), won the Pacific Northwest Booksellers Association Award (2011), won the Indies Choice Book Award (Adult Debut, 2011) and won the 2010 John Sargent, Sr. First Novel Prize. Awarded the 2011 W. Y. Boyd Literary Award for Excellence in Military Fiction by the American Library Association.

== Background ==
It is probable that the fictional Bravo Company 1st Battalion, 24th Marine Regiment, 5th Marine Division of the novel was Charlie Company, 1st Battalion, 4th Marine Regiment, 3rd Marine Division. The engagement at "Matterhorn" was probably the attack on "LZ Mack" Hill 484, and Hill 400 on 1–6 March 1969. With Lima Company 3rd Battalion 4th Marines in reserve (and its battalion commander, Lt. Col. Donald taking charge), two platoons from Charlie Company fought several times to reach and secure the summit, taking 15 or more casualties with at least seven killed in action, including a Canadian Marine, CPL George Victor Jmaeff, acting as platoon sergeant, who was posthumously awarded the Navy Cross. The author, First Lieutenant Karl Marlantes, who was the Executive Officer of Charlie Company, was also awarded the Navy Cross. Hills 484 and 400 had been occupied at a cost of 20 killed in action, and many wounded, by companies of the 3rd Battalion, 4th Marine Regiment in September–October 1966 and then abandoned.
