= List of Navy Cross recipients for the Vietnam War =

This is a list of Navy Cross recipients for actions of valor carried out during the Vietnam War, awarded by the United States Department of the Navy.

The Vietnam War was a conflict in Vietnam, Laos, and Cambodia from 1 November 1955 (Note: U.S. government reports cite 1 November 1955 as the commencement date of the "Vietnam Conflict", because this date marked when the U.S. Military Assistance Advisory Group (MAAG) in Indochina (deployed to Southeast Asia under President Truman) was reorganized into country-specific units and MAAG Vietnam was established.) to the fall of Saigon on 30 April 1975. It was officially fought between North Vietnam, supported by the Soviet Union, China, and other communist allies, and South Vietnam, supported by the United States and other anti-communist allies. After the French military withdrawal from Indochina in 1954, the U.S. assumed financial and military support for the South Vietnamese state. U.S. involvement escalated under President John F. Kennedy, from just under a thousand military advisors in 1959 to 23,000 in 1964. After the Gulf of Tonkin incident in August 1964, the U.S. Congress passed the Gulf of Tonkin Resolution and gave President Lyndon B. Johnson broad authority to increase the U.S. military presence in Vietnam. Johnson ordered the deployment of combat units for the first time and increased troop levels, reaching a peak of 543,000 in April 1969. The Paris Peace Accords of January 1973 saw all U.S. forces withdrawn.

As of June 2022, this list is incomplete, showing 496 Navy Crosses awarded in all service branches for actions of valor during the Vietnam War: 124 to US Navy recipients; 369 to US Marine Corps recipients; one Republic of Vietnam Navy recipient; one Army of the Republic of Vietnam recipient; and one US Army recipient. By partial comparison, as of June 2022, the U.S. Department of Defense shows 126 awarded to Navy recipients and 370 to Marines Corps recipients, for acts of valor during the Vietnam War.

== A ==
This along with the †, indicates that the Navy Cross was awarded posthumously

Name	Service	Rank	Place of action	Date of action	Notes
Lewis H. Abrams †	Marine Corps	Colonel	North Vietnam	October 25, 1967	A6A Intruder Pilot
Bobby W. Abshire	Marine Corps	Corporal	Quảng Nam Province	May 21, 1966	UH-1E Helicopter Crew Chief
Richard F. Abshire †	Marine Corps	Sergeant	Quảng Trị Province	May 2, 1968	Platoon sergeant
John T. Adams †	Marine Corps	Lance Corporal	Hill 488, Quảng Tín Province	June 16, 1966	Provided covering fire which allowed his Marines to withdraw, and then assaulted the enemy outnumbering enemy force and killed three in hand-to-hand combat before he himself was killed.
Laurence R. Adams III	Marine Corps	Captain	An Hoa, Quảng Nam Province	January 12, 1969	Helicopter Pilot
George Ajdukovich	Navy	Chief Boatswain's Mate	Muo Hai Canal	October 7, 1969	PBR
Vincent Alfonso	Marine Corps	Private First Class	Dong Ha Airstrip, Quảng Trị Province	July 20, 1966	Machine gunner
Yale G. Allen	Marine Corps	Corporal	Quảng Trị Province	March 5, 1969	Fire team leader
Russel V. Almeida †	Marine Corps	Lance Corporal	Quảng Nam Province	December 20, 1965	Placed his body between fellow Marines and a live grenade
Timothy D. Alspaugh	Navy	Seaman	Cai Lon River, Kien Giang Province	September 25, 1969	PBR
Kenneth A. Altazan	Marine Corps	Sergeant	Quảng Nam Province	May 9, 1969	CH-46 Helicopter crew chief, originally awarded Silver Star which was upgraded in 2015
Gerald D. Ambrose	Marine Corps	Lance Corporal	Quảng Nam Province	January 8, 1970	Squad leader
Willet R. Amendola †	Marine Corps	Corporal	Quảng Nam Province	November 2, 1967	Mortar man
John J. Anderson	Marine Corps	Sergeant	South Vietnam	October 27, 1965	Squad leader
Russell P. Armstrong	Marine Corps	Staff Sergeant	Con Thien, Quảng Trị Province	September 7–8, 1967	Platoon commander
Elpidio A. Arquero †	Marine Corps	Staff Sergeant	Quảng Nam Province	May 10, 1967	Platoon sergeant
James W. Ashby †	Navy	Hospitalman Third Class	Quảng Trị Province	June 1, 1967	Corpsman
James M. Aston †	Marine Corps	Private First Class	Quảng Nam Province	March 19, 1969	Smothered an explosive device with his own body
Stephen E. Austin †	Marine Corps	Corporal	Quảng Nam Province	June 8, 1968	Squad leader
Darrell E. Ayers †	Marine Corps	Staff Sergeant	Quảng Nam Province	March 19, 1970	Shielded a fellow Marine from enemy fire with his own body, thus saving his life

== B ==
This along with the †, indicates that the Navy Cross was awarded posthumously

Name	Service	Rank	Place of action	Date of action	Notes
James B. Back	Navy	Lieutenant	South Vietnam	February 28, 1968	Regimental surgeon, surgically removed a live B-40 rocket from a wounded Marine
Samuel J. Badnek	Marine Corps	Private	near Chu Lai, Quảng Tín Province	August 18, 1965	Single-handedly assaulted and killed eight of the enemy, remaining in the fight despite being wounded in the head
Curtis F. Baggett †	Marine Corps	Staff Sergeant	Village of Phong Luc (1), Quảng Nam Province	February 6, 1968	Platoon sergeant
Walter F. Bailey	Marine Corps	Sergeant	Liberty Bridge, Quảng Nam Province	March 21, 1970	Weapons platoon sergeant
Harold L. Baker	Navy	Radioman Second Class	South Vietnam	December 20, 1970	SEAL
Robert E. Baratko	Navy	Lieutenant, Junior Grade	South Vietnam	September 15, 1970	Attack helicopter aircraft commander
William B. Barber	Navy	Hospitalman Third Class	Quảng Trị Province	November 25, 1968	Corpsman
Robert C. Barnes	Marine Corps	Corporal	South Vietnam	December 17, 1966	Squad leader
Robert L. Barnett	Marine Corps	Corporal	Quảng Nam Province	May 9, 1969	Machine gun squad leader
James J. Barrett	Marine Corps	Corporal	Con Thien, Quảng Trị Province	September 19, 1967	Squad leader
John J. Barrett	Marine Corps	Captain	near An Hoa, Quảng Nam Province	February 26, 1969	CH-46 helicopter pilot
Richard W. Baskin	Marine Corps	Sergeant	Hill 950, Quảng Trị Province	June 6, 1967	Squad leader
Gordon D. Batcheller	Marine Corps	Captain	near Huế City, Thừa Thiên Province	January 31, 1968	Company commander
Kent C. Bateman	Marine Corps	Major	North Vietnam	October 25, 1967	A6A Intruder Pilot
Leo V. Beaulieu †	Marine Corps	Private First Class	near Chu Lai, Quảng Tín Province	May 16, 1966	Machine gunner who was badly wounded during the beginning of an ambush, however he was able to return accurate fire before he was killed
Van D. Bell Jr.	Marine Corps	Lieutenant Colonel	Village of Phong Ho (2)	June 6, 1966	Second award (first was in Korean War). Led three Ontos to reinforce a besieged Marine platoon, killing 30 of the enemy. He was then wounded during an ambush while returning to his command post, but led his Marines in repelling the attack.
David G. Bendorf †	Marine Corps	Lance Corporal	Quảng Trị Province	May 20, 1967	Machine gun team leader who held his position with his gunner, putting heavy fire on the enemy and allowing their platoon to withdraw before they were both killed
Francis A. Benoit †	Navy	Hospitalman Third Class	Quảng Trị Province	March 16, 1967	Corpsman
Ronald R. Benoit	Marine Corps	Second Lieutenant	South Vietnam	February 25, 1967	Platoon commander
Donald J. Berger	Marine Corps	Second Lieutenant	South Vietnam	March 11–12, 1966	Helicopter commander
Ricardo C. Binns	Marine Corps	Corporal	Hill 488, Quảng Tín Province	Jun 15–16, 1966	Despite being wounded in both legs, he directed the fire of seven Marines in his scout team to repulse an NVA battalion throughout the night.
William C. Bird	Marine Corps	Private First Class	near An Hoa, Quảng Nam Province	May 15, 1969	Rifleman
Stephen Blann †	Marine Corps	Lance Corporal	Quảng Trị Province	February 16, 1969	Squad leader who was killed by enemy fire while shielding a wounded Marine with his own body
Thomas L. Blevins Jr. †	Marine Corps	Corporal	Quảng Nam Province	May 31, 1969	Squad leader
Thomas J. J. Blonski	Navy	Lieutenant	North Vietnam	May 10, 1972	Jet pilot
Richard E. Bogan	Marine Corps	Lance Corporal	Village of Thon Ha Vinh, Thừa Thiên Province	April 12, 1968	Fire team leader who smothered an enemy grenade with his own body and was seriously wounded
Eugene R. Brady	Marine Corps	Lieutenant Colonel	near An Hoa, Quảng Nam Province	May 15, 1969	Helicopter squadron commander
Martin L. Brandtner	Marine Corps	Captain	Village of Lan Phouc, Quảng Nam Province	September 3, 1968	First award, picked up two enemy hand grenades and threw them away from a group of Marines. He shielded them from the blast of the second grenade and was wounded.
Martin L. Brandtner	Marine Corps	Captain	Village of My Binh, Quảng Nam Province	September 11, 1968	Second award, led his company in repelling repeated enemy assaults, killing 67 NVA at the cost of one Marine KIA
Leroy Brantley †	Marine Corps	Corporal	Village of Phu Nhuan, Quảng Nam Province	March 28, 1969	Squad leader
Kenneth R. Braun	Navy	Hospital Corpsman Third Class	Hill 70, Quảng Trị Province	March 30–31, 1967	Corpsman, was not awarded Navy Cross until 2005
Thomas D. Brindley †	Marine Corps	Second Lieutenant	Hill 881, Khe Sanh, Quảng Trị Province	January 20, 1968	Platoon commander
Charles E. Brown	Marine Corps	Corporal	Loc Dien Village, Thừa Thiên Province	January 31, 1968	Squad leader
David H. Brown †	Marine Corps	Sergeant	Hill 48, Quảng Trị Province	September 10, 1967	Platoon sergeant
Randall A. Browning	Marine Corps	Corporal	near the DMZ, Quảng Trị Province	September 10, 1967	M-50 Ontos commander
Charles W. Bryan †	Marine Corps	Corporal	Hill 881N, Khe Sanh, Quảng Trị Province	January 20, 1968	Patrol leader
Jarold O. Bryant	Marine Corps	Lance Corporal	Quảng Ngãi Province	March 21, 1966	Fire team leader
Richard W. Buchanan	Marine Corps	Lance Corporal	Village of Le Bac (1), Quảng Nam Province	May 24, 1968	Automatic rifleman
Lyle F. Bull	Navy	Lieutenant	Hanoi, North Vietnam	October 30, 1967	Bombardier/Navigator A-6
John R. Burke †	Marine Corps	Corporal	Hill 950, Khe Sanh, Quảng Trị Province	June 6, 1967	Sniper team leader
Robert W. Burnand Jr.	Navy	Lieutenant	North Vietnam	October 12–16, 1966	Commander of a search and rescue helicopter
Thomas R. Burnham	Marine Corps	Corporal	Nong Son, Quảng Nam Province	October 1, 1967	Fire team leader who threw himself on an enemy grenade which failed to detonate
Dewey R. Burns Jr. †	Navy	Hospitalman Third Class	Village of An Phong, Quảng Ngãi Province	September 13, 1969	Corpsman
Leon R. Burns	Marine Corps	Staff Sergeant	DMZ, Quảng Trị Province	July 2, 1967	Platoon commander
James B. Busey IV	Navy	Lieutenant Commander	Hanoi, North Vietnam	August 21, 1967	Pilot

== C ==
This along with the †, indicates that the Navy Cross was awarded posthumously

Name	Service	Rank	Place of action	Date of action	Notes
Lawrence B. Caine III	Marine Corps	Corporal	Quế Sơn Valley	May 13, 1967	Weapons squad leader
John C. Calhoun †	Marine Corps	Corporal	Nuoc Ngot Village, Thừa Thiên Province	January 7, 1968	Automatic rifleman
Kenneth R. Cameron †	Navy	Captain	North Vietnam	May 18, 1967 – October 4, 1970	POW
Joseph T. Campbell †	Marine Corps	First Lieutenant	Quảng Nam Province	June 15, 1968	Company executive officer
James J. Carroll †	Marine Corps	Captain	DMZ, Quảng Trị Province	September 27 – October 5, 1966	Company commander
Marshall N. Carter	Marine Corps	Captain	Quảng Nam Province	January 14, 1967	Company commander
Henry C. Casebolt †	Marine Corps	Corporal	Thừa Thiên Province	February 28, 1966	Squad leader
Michael J. Casey †	Marine Corps	Second Lieutenant	Thừa Thiên Province	March 18, 1968	Platoon commander
Robert M. Casey †	Navy	Hospitalman Third Class	Quảng Nam Province	May 16, 1968	Corpsman
Thomas M. Casey Jr. †	Marine Corps	Lance Corporal	Quảng Nam Province	February 16, 1969	Fire team leader
William Castillo	Marine Corps	Private First Class	Fire Support Base Russell, Quảng Trị Province	February 25, 1969	Ammunition man
Thomas J. Cavanaugh †	Marine Corps	Corporal	Quảng Nam Province	September 19, 1968	Platoon sergeant
Ernest C. Cheatham Jr.	Marine Corps	Lieutenant Colonel	Huế City, Thừa Thiên Province	February 3–March 3, 1968	Battalion commander
Paul R. Cheatwood	Marine Corps	Lance Corporal	Huế City, Thừa Thiên Province	February 16, 1968	Mortar man
Paul K. Christensen	Marine Corps	Corporal	South Vietnam	November 19, 1967	Machine gunner
William J. Christman III †	Marine Corps	Second Lieutenant	A Shau Valley, Quảng Trị Province	February 22, 1969	Platoon commander
George R. Christmas	Marine Corps	Captain	Huế City, Thừa Thiên Province	February 5, 1968	Company commander
Kenneth L. Christy Jr.	Marine Corps	Second Lieutenant	DMZ, Quảng Trị Province	January 18, 1968	awarded 26 yrs later
Roy Cisneros †	Marine Corps	Corporal	Hill 461, Quảng Trị Province	September 11, 1968	Squad leader
Raymond D. Clay	Navy	Hospitalman	Quảng Trị Province	September 24, 1966	Corpsman who shielded a wounded Marine from an enemy grenade
Edward A. Claybin	Marine Corps	Private First Class	South Vietnam	June 20, 1966	Cannoneer who threw himself on an enemy grenade which failed to detonate
Paul F. Cobb †	Marine Corps	Second Lieutenant	Quảng Nam Province	May 16, 1968	Platoon commander
Robert F. Cochran Jr.	Marine Corps	Second Lieutenant	near Chu Lai, Quảng Tín Province	August 18, 1965	
Clovis C. Coffman Jr.	Marine Corps	Gunnery Sergeant	near Long Bihn, Quảng Ngãi Province	October 10, 1966	Platoon leader
George T. Coker	Navy	Lieutenant Commander	Hanoi, North Vietnam	October 12, 1967	POW who attempted to escape
Bryant C. Collins	Marine Corps	Corporal	South Vietnam	July 12, 1965	Scout team leader
Bryan W. Compton Jr.	Navy	Commander	Hanoi, North Vietnam	August 21, 1967	Strike leader
Fred J. Cone	Marine Corps	Major	North Vietnam	October 25, 1967	A6A Intruder pilot
Milton W. Confer	Navy	Engineman First Class	South Vietnam	February 13, 1970	PBR
Richard F. Conklin	Marine Corps	Corporal	Ngok Tavak, Quảng Tín Province	May 10, 1968	Field artillery batteryman who held off an enemy attack with a machine gun. He threw several enemy grenades out of his position and was wounded and lost consciousness. When he regained consciousness, he returned to his weapon before he collapsed.
James J. Connell †	Navy	Lieutenant Commander	North Vietnam	April 1968 – June 1969	POW
Matthew J. Connelly III	Navy	Lieutenant	North Vietnam	May 10, 1972	Jet pilot
Clarence L. Cook	Navy	Lieutenant, Junior Grade	North Vietnam	June 19, 1968	Search and rescue helicopter co-pilot
James J. Coolican	Marine Corps	Captain	Huế City, Thừa Thiên Province	January 31, 1968	Military Assistance Command, Vietnam
Harry J. Corsetti	Marine Corps	Corporal	near Con Thien, Quảng Trị Province	August 15 & 17, 1968	Recon team leader
Merritt T. Cousins †	Marine Corps	Lance Corporal	Cam Lo, Quảng Trị Province	July 8, 1967	Radio operator
Joseph F. Covella †	Marine Corps	Gunnery Sergeant	Quảng Nam Province	January 3, 1966	Light Weapons Infantry Advisor to ARVN
Robert L. Cover	Marine Corps	Master Sergeant	near An Hoa, Quảng Nam Province	March 17, 1969	Aerial gunner
Charles J. Cox	Navy	Lieutenant	Ben Tre River, Kien Hoa Province	September 15–16, 1968	Mobile Riverine Force
Charles H. Crawford †	Navy	Hospitalman Third Class	Hill 174, Quảng Trị Province	May 29, 1967	Corpsman
Joseph R. Crockett Jr.	Marine Corps	Sergeant	near An Hoa, Quảng Nam Province	April 23, 1969	Recon team leader
James D. Cruse †	Navy	Hospitalman	near Khe Sanh, Quảng Trị Province	June 15, 1968	Corpsman
Roger W. Cummings †	Marine Corps	Private First Class	Thoung Duc area, Quảng Nam Province	April 20, 1968	Rifleman
Randall H. Cunningham	Navy	Lieutenant	North Vietnam	May 10, 1972	Jet ace
Ronald T. Curley	Marine Corps	Sergeant	Quảng Trị Province	May 16, 1967	Squad leader
Russell W. Curtis	Marine Corps	Gunnery Sergeant	South Vietnam	August 21, 1967	For smothering a grenade with his own body

== D ==
This along with the †, indicates that the Navy Cross was awarded posthumously

Name	Service	Rank	Place of action	Date of action	Notes
William H. Dabney	Marine Corps	Captain	Hill 881S, Khe Sanh, Quảng Trị Province	January 21 — April 14, 1968	Commanded two Marine rifle companies in the defense of Hill 881S during a 77 day siege where they sustained nearly 100% casualties. Dabney was the son-in-law of Chesty Puller, and was belatedly awarded his Navy Cross in 2005.
Robert G. Dalton	Marine Corps	Corporal	near the DMZ, Quảng Trị Province	May 25, 1969	Squad leader
David J. Danner	Marine Corps	Sergeant	Gio Linh, Quảng Trị Province	May 8, 1967	Tank maintenance man and crewman
William T. Dannheim	Navy	Lieutenant Commander	Song Ong Doc	October 20, 1970	PBR
Dana C. Darnell †	Marine Corps	Lance Corporal	Quảng Trị Province	April 24, 1967	60-mm. mortar ammunition carrier
Dennis D. Davis †	Marine Corps	Private First Class	Quảng Nam Province	August 28, 1969	Rifleman
John R. Dawson †	Marine Corps	Second Lieutenant	Thừa Thiên Province	October 27, 1967	Shielded his wounded commanding officer from enemy fire with his own body and returned fire before he was killed.
Edward Day †	Marine Corps	Lance Corporal	near the Rockpile, Quảng Trị Province	August 26, 1968	After killing an enemy machine gun crew, he was attempting to assist a wounded Marine when he was killed.
Andrew D. Debona	Marine Corps	Captain	near Con Thien, Quảng Trị Province	September 10, 1967	Company commander
Dieter Dengler	Navy	Lieutenant, Junior Grade	Laos	June 30, 1966	POW Escapee
Jeremiah A. Denton	Navy	Commander	North Vietnam	February – May 1966	POW
Mark E. Deplanche	Marine Corps	Corporal	Quảng Nam Province	January 13–14, 1966	Fire team leader
Marvin H. Devries	Marine Corps	First Lieutenant	near the DMZ, Quảng Trị Province	August 10, 1969	Platoon commander
Edward A. Dickson †	Navy	Lieutenant	North Vietnam	February 7, 1965	Jet attack pilot
Grover L. Dickson †	Marine Corps	Corporal	DMZ, Quảng Trị Province	November 11, 1966	Squad leader
Henry C. Dillard	Marine Corps	Corporal	Hill 174, Quảng Trị Province	May 29, 1967	3.5 inch rocket gunner
Harry H. Dinsmore	Navy	Captain	Da Nang, Quảng Nam Province	October 1, 1966	Chief Surgeon at U.S. Naval Support Activity. He volunteered to surgically remove a live 60-mm. mortar round from the chest of a wounded South Vietnamese soldier. He successfully removed the mortar and the patient survived.
Carl R. Dittman	Marine Corps	Corporal	Hill 461, Quảng Trị Province	November 14, 1968	Intelligence section scout
Billy M. Donaldson	Marine Corps	Staff Sergeant	near Dong Ha, Quảng Trị Province	August 8, 1966	Recon team leader who observed an enemy hand grenade land in a Marine's foxhole, jumped into the foxhole, and threw the grenade out. He was wounded when the grenade exploded shortly after he threw it.
Joseph P. Donovan	Marine Corps	First Lieutenant	near Nam O Bridge, Quảng Nam Province	February 22, 1969	First award, despite being wounded and his CH-46 helicopter being badly damaged while extracting a wounded Marine, he returned to another landing zone under heavy fire and landed twice to evacuate additional casualties.
Joseph P. Donovan	Marine Corps	First Lieutenant	near Liberty Bridge, Quảng Nam Province	April 21, 1969	Second award, landed his CH-46 helicopter under heavy fire to extract wounded Marines, during which the front of his helicopter was damaged by machine gun fire. He then commandeered a second helicopter and returned to the LZ under heavy fire.
Claude H. Dorris †	Marine Corps	Staff Sergeant	Nuoc Ngot Village, Thừa Thiên Province	January 7, 1968	Squad leader/advisor in a combined action platoon
John A. Dowd †	Marine Corps	Lieutenant Colonel	Quảng Nam Province	August 12–13, 1969	Battalion commander
Talmadge A. Downing	Marine Corps	Gunnery Sergeant	Quảng Ngãi Province	March 5, 1966	Weapons platoon sergeant
Thomas B. Driscoll	Marine Corps	Corporal	South Vietnam	September 4 & 6, 1967	Forward air controller
William P. Driscoll	Navy	Lieutenant, Junior Grade	North Vietnam	May 10, 1972	Radar intercept officer in F-4J Phantom credited with five victories
Barry W. Duff †	Marine Corps	Corporal	Quảng Nam Province	May 21, 1966	Fire team leader
Richard F. Duncan †	Marine Corps	Corporal	Quảng Nam Province	November 8, 1967	Machine gun squad leader
Carroll E. Dutterer Jr.	Navy	Boatswain's Mate First Class	Mekong Delta region	September 15, 1967	Mobile Riverine Force

== E–F ==
This along with the †, indicates that the Navy Cross was awarded posthumously

Name	Service	Rank	Place of action	Date of action	Notes
Lawrence M. Eades	Marine Corps	Lance Corporal	South Vietnam	February 2, 1968	Combined action platoon
Ronald Earhart	Navy				
Terry J. Ebbert	Marine Corps	First Lieutenant	Village of Phu Tay (1)	December 24, 1966	Company commander
Craig A. Edwards	Marine Corps	First Lieutenant	South Vietnam	August 20, 1970	Company commander who kicked an enemy hand grenade away from wounded Marines. He was wounded as he shielded the casualties from the resulting explosion.
Lowell F. Eggert	Navy	Commander	North Vietnam	May 10, 1972	Jet pilot
Joseph J. Ennis	Navy	Engineman Second Class	Mekong Delta region	April 4, 1968	Mobile Riverine Force
Barry W. Enoch	Navy	Chief Gunner's Mate	Long Phu District, Ba Xuyen Province	April 9, 1970	SEAL
John C. Ensch	Navy	Lieutenant	North Vietnam	May 23, 1972	Radar intercept officer who assisted his pilot in shooting down two enemy aircraft. He later became a POW on August 25, 1972.
Manuel A. Estrada	Marine Corps	Lance Corporal	near Con Thien, Quảng Trị Province	August 24–25, 1968	Recon squad leader
Richard A. Evans Jr. †	Marine Corps	Private First Class	Quảng Nam Province	August 29, 1968	Fire team leader
Rupert E. Fairfield Jr.	Marine Corps	Captain	near Quảng Ngãi, Quảng Ngãi Province	August 19, 1967	UH-1E helicopter co-pilot
Robert G. Fante †	Marine Corps	Corporal	near the Thu Ben River, Quảng Nam Province	August 6, 1968	Squad leader
Robert A. Federowski †	Marine Corps	Corporal	Thừa Thiên Province	May 24, 1968	Squad leader who was killed as he attempted to throw an enemy hand grenade away from his Marines
Donald L. Feerrar	Marine Corps	Lance Corporal	Quảng Nam Province	March 20, 1967	Threw an enemy hand grenade from his position, saving the lives of two Marines
Samuel L. Felton Jr.	Marine Corps	Private First Class	near An Hoa, Quảng Nam Province	June 11, 1969	Fire team leader
Michael P. Finley †	Marine Corps	Lance Corporal	Con Thien, Quảng Trị Province	May 8, 1967	Grenadier
Thomas W. Fisher †	Marine Corps	Lance Corporal	Hill 63, Quảng Tín Province	September 4, 1967	Fire team leader
William C. Fitzgerald †	Navy	Lieutenant	Quảng Ngãi Province	August 7, 1967	Senior advisor to South Vietnamese Navy
Jimmy E. Floren †	Marine Corps	Corporal	Quảng Nam Province	November 6, 1967	Fire team leader
Patrick O. Ford †	Navy	Gunner's Mate Second Class	Định Tường Province	June 21, 1968	PBR
Earl W. Fowler	Marine Corps	Corporal	Quảng Ngãi Province	March 28, 1966	Squad leader
John W. Frederick Jr. †	Marine Corps	Chief Warrant Officer	North Vietnam	June 1967 – August 1968	POW
Terrence J. Freund †	Navy	Radarman Second Class	near An Lac Thon Village	October 26, 1966	PBR
Roy A. Fryman	Marine Corps	Staff Sergeant	Phu Loc Valley, Thừa Thiên Province	April 29, 1968	Platoon commander. He was later killed in action on October 24, 1969, during his second tour.
John L. Fuller Jr. †	Marine Corps	Second Lieutenant	Village of Dai Khuong 1, Quảng Nam Province	March 23, 1967	Platoon leader
Robert B. Fuller	Navy	Captain	Hỏa Lò Prison, Hanoi, North Vietnam	October 1967	POW

== G ==
This along with the †, indicates that the Navy Cross was awarded posthumously

Name	Service	Rank	Place of action	Date of action	Notes
Bobby F. Galbreath †	Marine Corps	Captain	near Dong Ha, Quảng Trị Province	February 16, 1968	UH-1E helicopter pilot who attempted to evacuate wounded Marines, but his helicopter was shot down and he was killed.
Alvin R. Gale †	Marine Corps	Private First Class	Quảng Nam Province	January 28, 1969	Radio operator
Gary G. Gallagher	Navy	Yeoman Third Class	Mekong Delta region	October 10–11, 1968	SEAL
Patrick Gallagher	Marine Corps	Lance Corporal	near Cam Lo, Quảng Trị Province	July 18, 1966	Kicked a grenade out of his machine gun position, and then covered a second grenade with his body which failed to detonate. He was later killed in action on March 30, 1967.
Robert T. Gallagher	Navy	Senior Chief Interior Communications Electrician	South Vietnam	March 13, 1968	SEAL
Michael L. Gates	Navy	Engineman Third Class	Vam Co Dong River	July 10, 1969	PBR
Brian J. Gauthier †	Marine Corps	Corporal	near Da Nang, Quảng Nam Province	July 11, 1965	Squad leader
Alan R. Gerrish †	Navy	Hospitalman Second Class	near Da Nang Airfield, Quảng Nam Province	August 23, 1968	Shielded a wounded Marine from enemy fire with his own body and was applying first aid when he was killed.
Michael P. Getlin †	Marine Corps	Captain	Quảng Trị Province	March 30, 1967	Company commander who threw one enemy grenade from his position, and was attempting to throw out two more when he was killed.
George R. Gibson	Marine Corps	Corporal	near Cam Lo, Quảng Trị Province	August 8, 1966	Automatic rifleman
Richard M. Gilleland	Marine Corps	Sergeant	Quảng Nam Province	February 23, 1969	Platoon sergeant
Martin L. Gillespie Jr. †	Navy	Hospitalman Second Class	Quảng Ngãi Province	March 21, 1966	Rendered life-saving first aid to a wounded Marine while exposed to enemy fire. When he was moving the Marine to cover, he was mortally wounded.
Richard K. Gillingham †	Marine Corps	Corporal	Quảng Trị Province	May 19, 1967	Squad leader
Kevin Gillotte	Navy	Engineman Third Class	South Vietnam	January 11, 1969	Mobile Riverine Force
Ernesto Gomez	Marine Corps	Lance Corporal	Hill 881, Khe Sanh, Quảng Trị Province	January 25, 1968	CH-46 helicopter crew chief
Daniel G. Gonzales	Marine Corps	Corporal	Quảng Nam Province	June 7, 1969	60-mm. mortar section leader
William J. Goodsell †	Marine Corps	Major	Quảng Tín Province	June 16, 1966	UH-1F helicopter pilot
Gollie L. Grant †	Navy	Hospitalman Second Class	Gia Binh Village, Quảng Trị Province	September 19, 1966	Despite being wounded twice, he continued applying first aid to a wounded Marine and was killed when shot a third time.
George E. Gray	Marine Corps	Lance Corporal	Quảng Trị Province	February 2, 1968	He was wounded three times while knocking out an enemy mortar position. He then carried a wounded Marine to safety and shielded him from an exploding mortar round using his own body. He continued fighting the enemy and was wounded a fifth time.
John S. Green	Marine Corps	Gunnery Sergeant	Quế Sơn Valley	June 2, 1967	Led a frontal assault across 800 meters of rice paddies and knocked out a machine gun position, personally accounting for 10 enemies killed.
Maurice O. V. Green	Marine Corps	First Lieutenant	Quảng Nam Province	October 27, 1968	Intelligence officer
Robert B. Gregory Jr.	Marine Corps	Lance Corporal	Village of Hoa Huong, Quảng Nam Province	February 23 & 25, 1969	Rifleman in a combined action platoon
Michael E. Gresham	Marine Corps	Sergeant	Quảng Nam Province	September 11, 1968	Squad leader
Richard W. Gresko	Marine Corps	Sergeant	South Vietnam	March 11, 1970	Smothered an enemy hand grenade with his own body and was seriously wounded.
John G. Griffith †	Navy	Lieutenant	North Vietnam	February 24, 1968	Bombardier/Navigator
Paul E. Grimes Jr.	Marine Corps	Lance Corporal	Thanh Hieu (1), Quảng Ngãi Province	March 4, 1967	Rifleman
Donald B. Groce	Navy	Chief Boatswain's Mate	South Vietnam	September 4, 1970	Mobile Riverine Force
Nicholas E. Grosz Jr.	Marine Corps	First Lieutenant	Hamlet of Ky Phy, Quảng Tín Province	December 18, 1965	Company commander
Timothy S. Guarino	Marine Corps	Private First Class	South Vietnam	June 1, 1969	Shielded a Corpsman and a wounded Marine from an enemy hand grenade blast and was seriously wounded.
Robert P. Guay	Marine Corps	Major	An Hoa, Quảng Nam Province	March 19, 1966	UH-34D helicopter pilot
Victor J. Guerra	Marine Corps	Staff Sergeant	South Vietnam	October 27, 1969	Covered an enemy grenade with his body, and then managed to throw it away, saving the lives of three Marines.

== H ==
This along with the †, indicates that the Navy Cross was awarded posthumously

Name	Service	Rank	Place of action	Date of action	Notes
Michael R. Hall	Navy	Lieutenant Commander	Hanoi, North Vietnam	February 24, 1968	Bombardier/Navigator
Lee M. Halstead †	Marine Corps	First Lieutenant	near Da Nang, Quảng Nam Province	August 29, 1968	UH-1E helicopter pilot
Gregory O. Hampton	Navy	Seaman	Vam Co Dong River	August 20, 1969	Threw an enemy hand grenade off of his PBR and then put suppressive fire on the enemy with a machine gun
Eugene S. Hancock †	Navy	Hospitalman Second Class	near La Chau (2), Quảng Nam Province	February 24, 1969	After rendering life saving aid to four Marines, he was killed when running towards a fifth casualty.
Anthony C. Hanson	Navy	Aviation Electronics Technician Second Class	North Vietnam	July 2, 1967	Combat aircrewman who descended 150 feet from his helicopter into the jungle and rescued a wounded USAF pilot
Myron C. Harrington	Marine Corps	Captain	Huế City, Thừa Thiên Province	February 23, 1968	Company commander
David E. Hartsoe †	Marine Corps	Private First Class	Quảng Trị Province	May 20, 1967	Machine gunner who held his position with his team leader, putting heavy fire on the enemy and allowing their platoon to withdraw before they were both killed
William E. Hayenga Jr.	Navy	Fireman	Rach Hong Nhu River	February 4, 1968	PBR
Daniel J. Hayes	Marine Corps	Lance Corporal	South Vietnam	November 28, 1968	Squad leader
Vincil W. Hazelbaker	Marine Corps	Major	near Ban Hieu	August 8, 1966	UH-1E helicopter pilot
Ronald B. Helle	Marine Corps	Sergeant	Combat Base Baldy, Quảng Nam Province	January 28, 1971	Covered an enemy hand grenade with his body and threw it out of the compound before it exploded
Billy K. Henderson	Marine Corps	Lance Corporal	South Vietnam	July 17, 1969	Squad leader
Robert L. Hendricks	Marine Corps	Corporal	South Vietnam	February 19, 1968	Threw himself on an enemy hand grenade which failed to detonate
Daniel B. Henry	Navy	Hospitalman First Class	near Da Nang, Quảng Nam Province	August 27, 1967	Volunteered to assist a surgeon in a 45 minute operation to amputate a wounded man's leg which had a live 2.75 inch rocket imbedded in it. Was later killed in action on January 31, 1968.
Robert S. Herbert	Navy	Lieutenant, Junior Grade	Bo De river	August 11, 1970	Gunboat weapons officer
Felipe Herrera †	Marine Corps	Lance Corporal	near Thoung Due, Quảng Nam Province	September 20, 1968	Halted a hostile advance by killing six enemy and continued pouring accurate machine gun fire on the enemy before he was killed.
Alfred J. Herring †	Marine Corps	Lance Corporal	Song Bong River, Quảng Nam Province	September 20, 1970	Single-handedly held off three enemy assaults despite multiple wounds when every other member of his patrol was killed or wounded
Lee R. Herron †	Marine Corps	First Lieutenant	A Shau Valley, Quảng Trị Province	February 22, 1969	Assumed command of a platoon and single-handedly destroyed a nine of the enemy in a bunker before he was killed while assaulting a second bunker
William L. Hickey	Navy	Hospitalman Second Class	South Vietnam	July 4, 1966	Rendered aid to several Marines despite being wounded three times
John J. W. Hilgers	Marine Corps	Captain	Thon Son Lam area, Quảng Trị Province	August 23–24, 1966	Battalion operations officer
Lamont D. Hill †	Marine Corps	Private First Class	Village of Tan Lich, Quảng Trị Province	March 6, 1967	Despite being fatally wounded during the beginning of an ambush, he delivered devastating machine gun fire, allowing his platoon to kill 20 enemy soldiers.
John Hoapili	Marine Corps	Gunnery Sergeant	Quảng Trị Province	May 9, 1968	Platoon commander
Guy M. Hodgkins †	Marine Corps	Staff Sergeant	near An Hoa, Quảng Nam Province	September 3, 1966	Platoon sergeant
John R. Hoff Jr.	Marine Corps	Second Lieutenant	near Da Nang, Quảng Nam Province	April 7, 1970	Platoon commander
Billie D. Holmes	Navy	Hospitalman Third Class	Hill 488, Quảng Tín Province	June 15–16, 1966	Twice shielded wounded Marines from enemy grenades and continued rendering aid throughout the night despite being wounded.
Walter C. Holmes	Marine Corps	Sergeant	near Da Nang, Quảng Nam Province	December 27, 1965	60-mm. mortar section leader
James E. Honeycutt †	Marine Corps	Private First Class	near Con Thien, Quảng Trị Province	February 16, 1968	
Michael E. Hopkins †	Marine Corps	Private First Class	Quảng Nam Province	July 4, 1966	Deliberately exposed himself to draw enemy fire away from the wounded
Kenneth J. Houghton	Marine Corps	Colonel	Quế Sơn Valley	May 26 – June 5, 1967	Regimental commander
Charles A. House	Marine Corps	Lieutenant Colonel	A Shau	March 9–10, 1966	Squadron commander
Billy Howard †	Marine Corps	Gunnery Sergeant	Quảng Ngãi Province	March 21, 1966	Company gunnery sergeant
Gatlin J. Howell †	Marine Corps	First Lieutenant	Con Thien, Quảng Trị Province	July 2–7, 1967	Intelligence officer
Robert W. Hubbard †	Marine Corps	Captain	Huế City, Thừa Thiên Province	January 31 – February 4, 1968	Advisor to the Revolutionary Development Cadre
William H. Huffcut II	Marine Corps	Major	near DMZ, Quảng Trị Province	September 28, 1969	Pilot
Michael A. Huggins	Marine Corps	Private First Class	near Fire Support Base Sierra, Quảng Trị Province	June 27, 1969	Assaulted an enemy held hill and threw an enemy grenade away from another Marine
Stanley S. Hughes	Marine Corps	Colonel	Huế City, Thừa Thiên Province	February 3, 1968	Second award (first was in World War II)
Hubert H. Hunnicutt III	Marine Corps	Sergeant	near Khe Sanh, Quảng Trị Province	April 16–18, 1968	Squad leader
Charles B. Hunter	Navy	Commander	Hanoi, North Vietnam	October 30, 1967	Pilot

== I–K ==
This along with the †, indicates that the Navy Cross was awarded posthumously

Name	Service	Rank	Place of action	Date of action	Notes
Richard L. Jaehne	Marine Corps	Second Lieutenant	Que Son-Hiep Due Valley, Quảng Nam Province	August 28, 1969	Platoon leader
Alan C. James	Navy	Hospitalman Second Class	Mutter's Ridge area, Quảng Trị Province	September 9, 1968	Corpsman
George V. Jmaeff †	Marine Corps	Corporal	Hill 484, Quảng Trị Province	March 1, 1969	Platoon sergeant who single-handedly assaulted enemy emplacements, knocking out one position despite being wounded. When he was being given first aid, he left his position of safety to assist his Marines during a mortar barrage when he was killed.
James L. Johnson Jr.	Marine Corps	Corporal	A Shau Valley	February 17, 1969	Squad leader
Clement B. Johnston Jr. †	Marine Corps	Lance Corporal	near Xuan Ngoc Village, Quảng Ngãi Province	April 28, 1966	Shielded a Marine and Corpsman from a grenade blast
Philip B. Jones †	Marine Corps	Second Lieutenant	Quảng Nam Province	January 28, 1969	Platoon commander
John W. Joys †	Marine Corps	Staff Sergeant	Cam Lo, Quảng Trị Province	August 26, 1966	Platoon sergeant
Mark W. Judge †	Marine Corps	Private First Class	Quảng Trị Province	September 21, 1967	Rifleman
Richard D. Kaler †	Marine Corps	Corporal	near Cam Lo, Quảng Trị Province	July 21–22, 1966	Despite being wounded while assaulting enemy positions, he destroyed one position before he was killed.
David M. Kaufman †	Marine Corps	First Sergeant	Cam Lo, Quảng Trị Province	June 15, 1969	Assisted numerous casualties to safety and offered words of encouragement to his Marines before he was mortally wounded
Russell F. Keck †	Marine Corps	Corporal	Quảng Tín Province	May 18, 1967	Machine gun squad leader who provided covering fire, allowing his gunner to withdraw
Edwin C. Kelley Jr.	Marine Corps	First Lieutenant	Landing Zone Sierra, Quảng Trị Province	March 13–14, 1969	Led his company in the destruction of five bunker complexes and then held the objective despite NVA assaults throughout the night
James R. Kelly III †	Marine Corps	Corporal	Village of An Hoa, Quảng Trị Province	March 24, 1967	For single-handedly assaulting and destroying an enemy bunker and then fighting off six enemies who attempted to flank the platoon, killing three and causing the remainder to flee
Robert A. Kelly	Marine Corps	First Lieutenant	South Vietnam	September 3 & 5, 1966	Despite being wounded, he manned a machine gun on an M50 Ontos, was wounded three more times and lost consciousness.
Marwick L. Kemp	Marine Corps	Staff Sergeant	Quảng Ngãi Province	March 21, 1966	Took command of his platoon during an ambush and was instrumental in leading his Marines in killing 60 Viet Cong. He was later killed in action on February 18, 1969.
Benjamin A. Kenison †	Marine Corps	Lance Corporal	near DMZ, Quảng Trị Province	September 16, 1966	Was killed while attempting to carry a seriously wounded Marine to safety
Johnnie M. Kennedy	Marine Corps	Gunnery Sergeant	near Thang Binh, Quảng Tín Province	April 19, 1965	Light weapons infantry advisor who prevented the capture of 75 South Vietnamese Rangers and personally killed or wounded 25 of the enemy
William M. Keys	Marine Corps	Captain	Cam Lo, Quảng Trị Province	March 2, 1967	After repelling repeated enemy attacks for four hours, he led his company in killing more than 200 NVA soldiers and taking eight prisoners
Terrence E. Kierznowski †	Navy	Hospitalman Second Class	near Elliot Combat Base, Quảng Trị Province	September 12, 1969	Saved the life of a wounded Marine from three mortar rounds by shielding him with his own body
Donel C. Kinnard	Navy	Chief Hospital Corpsman	Ca Mau Peninsula	January 20–21, 1970	UDT
Donald E. Koelper †	Marine Corps	Major	Saigon	February 16, 1964	Warned theater patrons to take cover when he discovered a bomb in the lobby and was killed by the subsequent explosion
Glenn E. Kollmann †	Navy	Commander	North Vietnam	February 24, 1968	Squadron commander
Leonard Koontz	Marine Corps	Corporal	Hill 542, Khe Sanh, Quảng Trị Province	May 27, 1968	Single-handedly assaulted two enemy bunkers, delivered suppressive fire against additional positions, and assisted two wounded Marines to safety.
Kenneth A. Korkow	Marine Corps	Corporal	Khe Sanh, Quảng Trị Province	March 30, 1968	Directed his mortar section in destroying four enemy bunkers, single-handedly destroyed an enemy mortar position, and assisted several wounded Marines to an aid station before he was wounded.
William Kowalyk	Marine Corps	Lance Corporal	near Cam Lo, Quảng Trị Province	August 26, 1966	Despite being seriously wounded by an enemy grenade, he continued fighting from his foxhole and killed an enemy in hand-to-hand combat.
Roger W. Krueger	Navy	Lieutenant	North Vietnam	March 24, 1968	A-6A bombardier/navigator
Marc J. Kuzma †	Marine Corps	Private First Class	near Con Thien, Quảng Trị Province	April 26, 1968	For knocking out two bunkers and killing five of the enemy before he himself was killed while trying to assist wounded Marines

== L ==
This along with the †, indicates that the Navy Cross was awarded posthumously

Name	Service	Rank	Place of action	Date of action	Notes
Bobby D. Lain	Marine Corps	Captain	Quảng Nam Province	February 19, 1967	Led his company in an assault which inflicted 250 casualties on the enemy before suffering the loss of both of his legs from a land mine.
Albert Lankford III	Marine Corps	First Lieutenant	South Vietnam	April 21, 1969	Rallied his men and led them in a counterattack against sappers which penetrated the wire
Alvin S. LaPointe	Marine Corps	Private First Class	Quảng Ngãi Province	March 28, 1966	Single-handedly assaulted and entered enemy bunker and tunnel system, silencing an anti-aircraft weapon.
Alfred P. LaPorte Jr.	Marine Corps	Sergeant	Fire Support Base Neville, Quảng Trị Province	February 25, 1969	Removed a live 81-mm. mortar round which had landed near the command post with his bare hands, suffering severe burns.
William D. Laraway †	Marine Corps	Lance Corporal	Cau Hai Hamlet, Thừa Thiên Province	April 11, 1967	Suppressed the enemy with machine gun fire, and then shielded a wounded Corpsman from multiple enemy hand grenades, throwing two and kicking the rest of the grenades away
David R. Larsen	Navy	Gunner's Mate Third Class	Saigon River	August 2, 1969	Led his PBR crew ashore to assist a six-man patrol which was engaged with an enemy platoon
Charles R. Lauer †	Marine Corps	Corporal	Hill 11, Quảng Nam Province	June 18, 1967	Remained at the machine gun on top of an amphibian tractor to provide covering fire for the wounded
Lawrence J. Lazaro	Marine Corps	Corporal	Quảng Trị Province	September 19, 1966	Assumed command of his squad during an ambush and fought his was to the wounded
Armando G. Leal Jr. †	Navy	Hospitalman Third Class	Quảng Tín Province	September 4, 1967	Rendered aid to wounded Marines for two hours despite multiple wounds, and then shielded a Marine from enemy fire using his own body
Claude G. Lebas	Marine Corps	Lance Corporal	Quảng Nam Province	April 2, 1966	Single-handedly destroyed an enemy mortar position and then retrieved a machine gun 100 meters forward of his platoon
Walter R. Ledbetter Jr.	Marine Corps	Lieutenant Colonel	Quảng Nam Province	January 31, 1970	Landed his helicopter a minefield while taking sniper fire to extract wounded Marines
Kenneth Ledford Jr.	Army	First Lieutenant	South Vietnam	September 15, 1970	Medical evacuation pilot who landed his helicopter under heavy fire to extract the crews of two crashed Navy helicopters
Alan C. Lefler	Marine Corps	Lance Corporal	near An Hoa, Quảng Nam Province	March 17, 1969	Delivered devastating machine gun fire from his door gun for four hours, and then left his helicopter on four occasions to assist wounded Marines back to it
William G. Leftwich Jr.	Marine Corps	Lieutenant Colonel	Hoai An Village, Binh Dinh Province	March 9, 1965	Led a Vietnamese Marine Brigade in the successful assault of a village despite being wounded multiple times. He was later killed in a helicopter crash in Quảng Nam Province on November 18, 1970.
David H. Lewis	Navy	Lieutenant Commander	South Vietnam	September 24, 1969	Surgically removed an armed grenade launcher round which was imbedded in the thigh of a wounded Marine. The operation was successful and he saved the life of the Marine.
James B. Linder	Navy	Commander	North Vietnam	September 28, 1967	Planned, led, and directed 31 aircraft in an attack against the heavily defended Haiphong rail way/high way bridge, successfully destroying it without the loss of a single aircraft.
Jerry E. Lineberry †	Marine Corps	Staff Sergeant	Que Son Mountains, Quảng Nam Province	February 12, 1970	When his platoon was badly ambushed, he rallied the men in evacuating the casualties and was directing artillery fire when he was killed.
Lawrence H. Livingston	Marine Corps	Captain	near Quảng Trị City, Quảng Trị Province	July 11, 1972	Led Vietnamese Marines in an assault against enemy trenches in a landing zone before carrying a wounded man to safety.
Melvin M. Long	Marine Corps	Sergeant	Quảng Tín Province	June 2, 1967	Led his squad in several assaults against enemy positions despite being wounded
Steven D. Lopez	Marine Corps	Corporal	near Khe Sanh, Quảng Trị Province	May 9–10, 1967	Saved the lives of several Marines in his patrol by calling in air support and fighting off an enemy platoon despite being wounded multiple times
Jose G. Lopez	Marine Corps	Sergeant	near Khe Sanh, Quảng Trị Province	September 2, 1967	When his small recon team encountered a large enemy force, he killed several of the enemy and called in close air support
John J. Lord Jr.	Marine Corps	Sergeant	South Vietnam	July 28, 1968	Took command of his company when all leadership was incapacitated during an ambush. Originally awarded the Bronze Star, he was awarded the Navy Cross in 2018.
John L. Loweranitis †	Marine Corps	Corporal	Quảng Trị Province	March 30, 1967	Covered the withdraw of his command group during an NVA attack, personally killing five of the enemy
Steven M. Lowery	Marine Corps	Corporal	Fire Support Base Argonne, Quảng Trị Province	March 5, 1969	Despite being severely wounded at the beginning of an NVA assault, he personally killed several of the enemy and directed artillery support
David E. Lownds	Marine Corps	Colonel	Khe Sanh, Quảng Trị Province	August 1967 – March 1968	As the commanding officer of Khe Sanh Combat Base, he established outposts on Hills 881S, 861, and 950, led the defense of Khe Sanh during the Ten Offensive, and coordinated and led Operation Scotland.
Joseph Luca	Marine Corps	Sergeant	Quảng Ngãi Province	March 5, 1967	Provided covering fire from an exposed position, allowing the wounded to be evacuated
Donald W. Lumbard	Marine Corps	Lance Corporal	near An Hoa, Quảng Nam Province	July 4, 1966	Mounted the exposed machine guns of several amphibian tractors during an ambush, and despite being wounded himself, he assisted other wounded Marines to safety
Glen T. Lunsford †	Marine Corps	Sergeant	Phu Son (2), Quảng Nam Province	February 3, 1968	Entered a tunnel complex three times, killing an enemy and taking two prisoners despite being wounded

== M ==
This along with the †, indicates that the Navy Cross was awarded posthumously

Name	Service	Rank	Place of action	Date of action	Notes
Francis W. Mack †	Navy	Hospitalman Third Class	Cam Lo River Valley, Quảng Trị Province	August 17, 1966	Rendered aid to numerous wounded Marines during an ambush before he was killed
Matthew C. MacVane	Marine Corps	Corporal	Cam Lo, Quảng Trị Province	August 14, 1967	Helped repulse a one hour long NVA assault on his compound
George M. Malone Jr.	Marine Corps	Second Lieutenant	A Shau Valley, Quảng Trị Province	February 22, 1969	Led his platoon in an assault against an NVA bunker complex, and despite being wounded twice, he single-handedly destroyed a machine gun position and six of the enemy
Bennie H. Mann Jr.	Marine Corps	Major	Quảng Tín Province	March 31, 1965	Flew his helicopter into a landing zone under heavy five multiple times, offloading Vietnamese Marines before rescuing the crew of a downed helicopter
Karl A. Marlantes	Marine Corps	First Lieutenant	near the Rockpile, Quảng Trị Province	March 1–6, 1969	Led several platoons in the assault of an NVA held hill, personally destroying four bunkers despite being wounded, and refusing evacuation when he learned all other officers and NCOs were casualties
Cecil H. Martin	Navy	Mineman First Class	Mekong Delta region	November 21, 1968	Led his PBR to rescue another boat crew during an ambush
Raymond C. Martin †	Marine Corps	Sergeant	Quảng Nam Province	March 18, 1966	Led his squad in an assault across rice paddies against a Viet Cong battalion, silencing an enemy machine gun position before shielding wounded Marine from mortar fire with his own body
James A. Mayton	Navy	Hospitalman First Class	South Vietnam	May 21, 1966	Made eight trips from his medical evacuation helicopter, rescuing 23 wounded Marines under heavy fire
Carlos K. McAfee	Marine Corps	Captain	South Vietnam	June 12, 1966	When all other advisors were killed during an enemy assault, he took command of a Vietnamese Marine Brigade for three hours before leading them in a counterattack
Bertram W. McCauley	Marine Corps	Major	near Phu Tay, Quảng Nam Province	September 5, 1966	When his first helicopter was badly damaged while rescuing wounded Marines under heavy fire, he commandeered a second helicopter and returned to the action to retrieve additional casualties
Michael P. McCormick †	Marine Corps	Second Lieutenant	Fire Support Base Argonne, Quảng Trị Province	March 20, 1969	Led his platoon against an enemy bunker complex overlooking the landing zone, destroying several enemy positions. He was attempting to assist the wounded point man when he was killed.
Eugene P. McDaniel	Navy	Captain	North Vietnam	June 14–29, 1969	POW who accepted responsibility for an escape attempt and was severely tortured
James V. McDaniel	Marine Corps	Second Lieutenant	Koh Tang Island, Cambodia	May 15, 1975	Landing on the beach in the first helicopter of the first wave during the Mayaguez incident, he led a patrol forward which sustained heavy casualties. Despite being wounded himself, he carried two Marines to safety and established a defensive perimeter.
Thomas C. McDonald	Marine Corps	Captain	near Da Nang, Quảng Nam Province	March 28, 1971	Illuminated several large groups of enemy troops with his helicopter searchlight despite heavy fire, resulting in the deaths of many of the enemy.
Robert M. McEwen	Navy	Lieutenant Commander	Hanoi, North Vietnam	March 30, 1968	A-6 Bombardier/Navigator who precisely dropped several bombs on a heavily defended port facility
William D. McHenry	Marine Corps	Corporal	Phu Loc District Headquarters	February 1, 1968	Assumed command of a reaction force during an ambush, moved several wounded Marines to safety, and provided covering fire despite being wounded himself, allowing the force to withdraw
Gerald C. McKeen †	Navy	Hospitalman	Quảng Trị Province	September 24, 1966	Despite being wounded twice, he continued to provide aid to wounded Marines for three hours
Ronald E. McKeown	Navy	Lieutenant Commander	North Vietnam	May 23, 1972	Shot down two enemy fighter jets in a single action
Arthur G. McRae	Marine Corps	Corporal	Quảng Ngãi Province	March 16, 1967	Led four wounded Marines to safety after being cut-off for over one hour
James E. McWhorter †	Marine Corps	Lance Corporal	Quảng Trị Province	August 22, 1969	Despite being wounded, he carried two wounded Marines to safety and was attempting to assist a third when he was killed
Terrance L. Meier †	Marine Corps	Staff Sergeant	near Ca Lu, Quảng Trị Province	July 21, 1967	Assumed command of his platoon during an ambush and was covering the evacuation of the wounded when he was killed
Angel Mendez †	Marine Corps	Sergeant	Quảng Ngãi Province	March 16, 1967	Carried his wounded platoon commander to safety across 75 meters of open rice paddies under heavy fire and was mortally wounded as they reached safety
William I. Mercer †	Navy	Hospitalman Second Class	near Khe Sanh, Quảng Trị Province	June 15, 1968	Rendered first aid to several wounded Marines, shielding them on two occasions from enemy fire using his own body before he was killed
John R. Meuse †	Marine Corps	Private First Class	near Khe Sanh, Quảng Trị Province	May 3, 1967	Reported accurate information over the radio for over one hour despite being wounded during an NVA attack, and was later found with five dead enemies in front of his position
Harold D. Meyerkord †	Navy	Lieutenant	Ninh Thuận Province	November 30, 1964, January 13 & 24, 1965, March 16, 1965	Naval advisor to the River Force Vietnamese Navy who was involved in more than 30 combat operations
Paul L. Milius †	Navy	Captain	Laos	February 27, 1968	Remained at the controls of his crippled aircraft, allowing seven of his nine crew members to bail out and be rescued shortly after
Cleatus A. Miller Jr.	Marine Corps	Private First Class	Que Son District, Quảng Nam Province	October 25, 1969	Despite being wounded in the leg at the beginning of an ambush, he dragged himself to an exposed position when he fired his machine gun at the enemy until he lost consciousness
Robert G. Mitchell	Marine Corps	Major	near Da Nang, Quảng Nam Province	November 29, 1968	Extracted several groups of Marines with his CH-46 helicopter while under heavy fire
Robert E. Moe	Marine Corps	Staff Sergeant	Quảng Tín Province	December 9, 1965	Led his platoon in an assault against a Viet Cong battalion, saving the lives of approximately 40 South Vietnamese soldiers
Richard E. Moffit	Marine Corps	Sergeant	near the DMZ, Quảng Trị Province	May 16–17, 1967	Single-handedly assaulted enemy positions on two consecutive days, killing several of the enemy
Frederick G. Monahan	Marine Corps	Lance Corporal	near Hill 881, Khe Sanh, Quảng Trị Province	May 3, 1967	Single-handedly attacked and engaged an NVA force which had penetrated the wire in hand-to-hand combat and, despite being wounded, continued fighting for another two hours
Robert E. Monahon †	Marine Corps	Lance Corporal	Quảng Trị Province	May 28, 1967	After assisting one wounded Marine to safety, he ran 75 meters to assist two more wounded Marines and was wounded before he fired a machine gun into an NVA bunker and killed three of the enemy
Robert L. Montgomery	Marine Corps	Second Lieutenant	South Vietnam	June 8, 1969	Single-handedly assaulted two enemy machine gun positions despite being wounded
Freddie L. Moore	Marine Corps	Lance Corporal	South Vietnam	August 12, 1969	Assumed command of part of his platoon and led an assault to rescue several cut-off Marines
Ronald A. Moore †	Marine Corps	Lance Corporal	Dai Loc District, Quảng Nam Province	July 19, 1967	Despite being wounded, he provided covering fire to allow his fire team to withdraw, killing four Viet Cong
Christopher K. Mosher	Marine Corps	Lance Corporal	South Vietnam	May 13, 1967	Directed precise air strikes from an exposed position for five hours before he was seriously wounded
Joseph E. Muir †	Marine Corps	Lieutenant Colonel	Quảng Ngãi Province	August 18–24, 1965	Led his battalion in killing more than 200 of the enemy
James E. Mulloy Jr.	Marine Corps	Sergeant	near Chu Lai, Quảng Tín Province	August 18, 1965	Single-handedly defended an amphibian tractor that was stuck in a rice paddy for 20 hours
David R. Murphy	Navy	Lieutenant Commander	North Vietnam	October 12–16, 1966	Rescued a downed Navy pilot, and later successfully flew his helicopter to the coast and ditched it in the sea after it was badly damaged and all crew members wounded
James E. Murphy	Marine Corps	Captain	near Con Thien, Quảng Trị Province	October 26, 1967	When he observed a helicopter crash 150 meters from his position, he single-handedly ran to the helicopter, pulled two men from the helicopter, and held off a large enemy force for over an hour
John D. Murray	Marine Corps	Captain	Quảng Tín Province	September 4, 6 & 10, 1967	Led his company to relieve several beleaguered companies
William H. Myers †	Marine Corps	Private First Class	near Que Son, Quảng Tín Province	May 12, 1967	Twice ran 150 meters across an open rice paddy to pour devastating machine gun fire on the enemy

== N–Q ==
This along with the †, indicates that the Navy Cross was awarded posthumously

Name	Service	Rank	Place of action	Date of action	Notes
Michael I. Neil	Marine Corps	Second Lieutenant	Phouc Ninh (2), Quảng Nam Province	December 20, 1967	Platoon commander
James R. Nelson	Navy	Lieutenant	Hai Muoi Tarn Canal, Định Tường Province	August 18, 1968	Mobile Riverine Force
Nguyễn Văn Kiệt	Republic of Vietnam Navy	Petty Officer Third Class	Quảng Trị Province	Apr 13, 1972	Lone Vietnam Navy Sea Commando to join lone US Navy SEAL Thomas R. Norris in ignoring "hold position" orders to complete the rescue of a downed US Air Force navigator
Thomas E. Noel	Marine Corps	Second Lieutenant	near Ca Lu, Quảng Trị Province	March 1, 1969	Platoon commander
Patrick J. Noon Jr.	Marine Corps	Sergeant	Quảng Trị Province	August 24, 1966	Platoon guide
James A. Norris †	Marine Corps	Lance Corporal	Quảng Nam Province	August 13, 1969	Fire team leader
John J. Norton	Marine Corps	Captain	near Huế, Thừa Thiên Province	April 21, 1968	Company commander who threw himself on a grenade which failed to detonate
George O. Norwood	Marine Corps	Lance Corporal	Quảng Ngãi Province	March 4, 1966	Fire team leader
John L. Oakley	Marine Corps	Lance Corporal	near Da Nang, Quảng Nam Province	August 22, 1966	Squad leader
Joseph J. O'Brien	Marine Corps	Captain	Quảng Trị Province	September 17–23, 1967	Originally awarded the Bronze Star which was upgraded in 2006
Martin E. O'Connor	Marine Corps	Major	South Vietnam	November 5, 1969	Senior Marine advisor to Republic of Vietnam Marine Corps
John W. O’Kelley	Navy	Seaman	Ong Huong River, Kien Hoa Province	May 26, 1968	Mobile Riverine Force
Samuel G. Orlando †	Navy	Hospitalman	Quảng Ngãi Province	March 4, 1966	Corpsman
Frederick F. Palmer	Navy	Commander	North Vietnam	June 29, 1966	Led a strike force against the heavily defended Hai Phong petroleum and oil storage area
Thomas C. Panian	Marine Corps	Sergeant	Quảng Tín Province	September 6, 1967	When half of his platoon was killed or wounded in just five minutes, he took charge and led his platoon in repulsing three enemy attacks over the next eight hours, during which he was wounded three times.
Lee R. Parrott	Marine Corps	Gunnery Sergeant	South Vietnam	August 10, 1969	When his platoon's defensive perimeter was penetrated by sappers, he charged and killed several of the enemy, assisted wounded Marines to the rear, and led his platoon in repelling several more attacks.
Anthony Paskevich Jr.	Marine Corps	Captain	near An Hoa, Quảng Nam Province	March 17, 1969	He refueled and rearmed his helicopter seven times during a four hour period, attacked enemy positions with rockets and machine guns, and landed his helicopter four times to evacuate wounded Marines from a rice paddy despite his helicopter being severely damaged by enemy fire.
James W. Pate Jr.	Navy	Lieutenant	North Vietnam	March 24, 1968	Pilot of the A-6A night all-weather attack against the heavily defended Kinh No railroad yard
Joseph S. Peczeli	Marine Corps	Gunnery Sergeant	near An Hoa, Quảng Nam Province	March 24, 1967	Defeated an enemy ambush and evacuated wounded Marines despite being wounded himself
William L. Peters Jr. †	Marine Corps	First Lieutenant	Quảng Nam Province	April 12, 1969	Extracted a reconnaissance team while under heavy fire, during which his CH-46 helicopter sustained extensive damage
Dennie D. Peterson †	Marine Corps	Second Lieutenant	Quảng Tín Province	September 6, 1967	Moved to an exposed position for two hours to call in artillery fire by himself and was wounded. Once the enemy was repulsed, he assisted wounded Marines back to the company perimeter, where he was wounded five more times.
John G. Phelps	Marine Corps	Lance Corporal	near Quảng Ngãi, Quảng Ngãi Province	August 19, 1967	When his UH-1E helicopter landed to extract four soldiers from a downed helicopter, he killed many enemy with his machine gun, and left the helicopter twice to help carry wounded men to the helicopter, killing one Viet Cong at close range with his pistol.
John C. Phillips	Navy	Hospitalman	South Vietnam	December 19, 1968	Threw his body across a wounded Marine to protect him from an exploding enemy hand grenade and continued rendering aid despite being painfully wounded.
Louis R. Piatt	Marine Corps	Second Lieutenant	Bo Ban area, Quảng Nam Province	February 23–24, 1969	Led his platoon against an NVA battalion, accounting for 48 enemies killed
Louis A. Pichon Jr. †	Marine Corps	Gunnery Sergeant	near Cam Lo, Quảng Trị Province	March 24, 1967	Single-handedly attacked an NVA bunker complex, destroying one bunker before he was killed while advancing on a second.
Herbert E. Pierpan	Marine Corps	Major	Fire Support Base Argonne, Quảng Trị Province	March 20–22, 1969	Assaulted and knocked out an enemy bunker, personally killing two NVA soldiers, and assumed command of the battalion when his commanding officer was killed.
Roy E. Pitts †	Marine Corps	Private First Class	near Vandegrift Combat Base, Quảng Trị Province	February 17, 1969	After crawling 20 meters to a wounded Marine and stopping the bleeding, he was in the process of dragging the man back to cover when he was mortally wounded.
James A. Popp †	Marine Corps	Private First Class	Quảng Nam Province	April 8, 1967	Despite being wounded twice during an ambush, he continued to fire his grenade launcher at the enemy, personally killing six before he was hit a third time.
Robert O. Porter	Navy	Chief Gunner's Mate	Giang Thanh River	June 10, 1970	Threw an enemy hand grenade out of his PBR, and then directed suppressive fire on the attacking enemy despite being wounded.
Leroy N. Poulson	Marine Corps	Gunnery Sergeant	near Quảng Ngãi, Quảng Ngãi Province	August 19, 1967	When his UH-1E helicopter landed to extract four soldiers from a downed helicopter, he made multiple trips under heavy fire to rescue three wounded soldiers.
Charles T. Powell †	Marine Corps	Sergeant	near Dong Ha, Quảng Trị Province	May 31, 1968	Led a fire team in an assault of an NVA mortar position, personally killing two enemies, and then provided suppressive fire allowing his wounded Marines to withdraw, silencing a machine gun before he was killed.
Richard L. Powell †	Navy	Hospitalman	Hill 55, Quảng Nam Province	August 29, 1968	Continued to aid multiple wounded Marines despite being shot himself in the arm, and was rendering first aid to a Marine just 15 meters from an enemy machine gun when he was killed.
Trent R. Powers †	Navy	Captain	North Vietnam	October 31, 1965	Led eight jet attack aircraft over 600 miles to bomb a heavily defended area, during which he was shot down and captured as a POW.
Francis S. Prendergast	Navy	Lieutenant, Junior Grade	North Vietnam	March 9, 1967	Was shot down and captured as a POW, but soon escaped that same day and was rescued by a helicopter.
Robert L. Quick †	Marine Corps	Private First Class	near Gio Linh, Quảng Trị Province	February 7, 1968	Rifleman who was mortally wounded while attempting to throw an enemy grenade away from his fellow Marines

== R ==
This along with the †, indicates that the Navy Cross was awarded posthumously

Name	Service	Rank	Place of action	Date of action	Notes
Warren H. Ralya Jr. †	Marine Corps	Corporal	Cua Viet River, Quảng Trị Province	January 20, 1968	Destroyed three enemy positions with his grenade launcher during an ambush
Donald R. Rash †	Marine Corps	Private First Class	near Khe Sanh, Quảng Trị Province	March 30, 1968	Assaulted and silenced five enemy positions during an ambush
Darrell T. Ray †	Marine Corps	Private First Class	Phu Thu Peninsula, Thừa Thiên Province	February 29, 1966	Despite being wounded three times while assaulting an enemy machine gun position, he persisted in the assault until he silenced the position
John M. Reid †	Marine Corps	Corporal	Quảng Nam Province	May 10, 1967	Grabbed a machine gun and moved to exposed ground to provide covering fire
Donald J. Reilly †	Marine Corps	Major	Quảng Tín Province	December 9, 1965	Was mortally wounded and made a crash landing while attempting to evacuate wounded Marines under heavy fire at night with a heavy overcast
James R. Reilly †	Marine Corps	Private First Class	Da Nang, Quảng Nam Province	March 17, 1966	Smothered an enemy hand grenade with his own body, saving the life of a fellow Marine
Tiago Reis †	Marine Corps	Corporal	near Con Thien, Quảng Trị Province	September 21, 1967	When every other member of his squad was wounded, he dragged each Marine to cover and treated their wounds. He continued exposing himself to enemy fire searching for additional casualties when he was killed
Marvin D. Reynolds	Navy	Lieutenant Commander	near Hanoi, North Vietnam	July 17, 1967	A4E pilot who located a fellow pilot who was shot down and escorted the rescue helicopter to successfully extract the man, silencing multiple enemy anti-aircraft positions along the way
Francis E. Rhodes Jr.	Navy	Lieutenant Commander	Mekong Delta region	September 15, 1967	Led his riverine assault craft in killing more than 200 of the enemy and destroying 600 bunkers
Thomas A. Richards	Marine Corps	Corporal	South Vietnam	June 5–6, 1969	Regrouped his platoon and led the Marines in fighting off the enemy throughout the night, before manning a machine gun and personally killing eight of the enemy
Harold A. Riensche	Marine Corps	Staff Sergeant	near Dong Ha, Quảng Trị Province	March 24, 1969	Single-handedly held off an NVA attack on his disabled M51 Tank Retriever
John W. Ripley	Marine Corps	Captain	Quảng Trị Province	April 2, 1972	On five occasions, he dangled under a bridge to place explosives while under enemy fire. He then destroyed the bridge with the explosives he had placed, stopping an enemy assault.
José L. Rivera	Marine Corps	Lance Corporal	Quảng Nam Province	March 26, 1969	While occupying a listening post, he covered an enemy hand grenade with his helmet, two flak jackets, and his own body. Despite being wounded, he covered the withdrawal of six Marines.
Miguel Rivera-Sotomayor	Marine Corps	Corporal	Quảng Trị Province	July 29, 1967	Delivered devastating fire on the enemy using a grenade launcher, a machine gun and a rifle despite being seriously wounded
Jettie Rivers Jr. †	Marine Corps	Second Lieutenant	Quảng Trị Province	May 14–15, 1967	While the Company First Sergeant, he rallied his Marines in repulsing numerous NVA attacks
James J. Roberson	Marine Corps	Second Lieutenant	Quảng Nam Province	March 24, 1967	Led two amphibian tractors in gaining fire superiority over the enemy during an ambush and evacuating wounded Marines
David B. Robinson	Navy	Lieutenant Commander	Bo De River	August 11, 1970	Despite being seriously wounded at the beginning of an ambush, he directed the fire of his patrol gunboat and defeated the enemy
Joe G. Rodrigues Jr. †	Marine Corps	Sergeant	Fire Base Pete, Quảng Trị Province	February 22 – March 3, 1969	Assumed command of his platoon when the platoon leader was killed, and later placed his own body between his wounded Marines and the enemy and provided covering fire
Gerald W. Rogers	Navy	Lieutenant Commander	Hanoi, North Vietnam	March 30, 1968	Flew his A-6 in a single-plane night attack against a heavily defended port facility and successfully bombed the target
Raymond G. Rogers Jr.	Marine Corps	First Sergeant	near the DMZ, Quảng Trị Province	March 30, 1967	Led his company in repulsing an NVA attack, accounting for 62 enemy soldiers killed
John R. Roland Jr.	Navy	Lieutenant, Junior Grade	Ham Luong River, Kien Hoa Province	January 28, 1969	Placed his patrol craft between two fellow Sailors who were blown from another boat into the river and enemy positions and successfully rescued them
Robert T. Roller	Marine Corps	Sergeant	near the DMZ, Quảng Trị Province	October 13, 1966	Directed the evacuation of the wounded and then led the assault on an enemy position despite being wounded multiple times
Wayne E. Rollings	Marine Corps	First Lieutenant	Quảng Nam Province	September 18, 1969	Place himself between his point man and the enemy and was wounded while delivering suppressive fire. He then led an assault against the enemy position
Richard E. Romine	Marine Corps	Lieutenant Colonel	South Vietnam	June 3–4, 1967	After crash-landing his helicopter away from enemy troops, he led his crew in fighting through enemy positions, before calling in precision air strikes for the next 24 hours
Roger D. Rosenberger †	Marine Corps	Private First Class	near Dong Ha, Quảng Trị Province	June 17, 1969	Single-handedly assaulted an enemy position under heavy fire
David L. Ross	Marine Corps	Major	South Vietnam	September 4, 1967	When he was forced to crash land his helicopter in a landing zone, and then directed airstrikes to support a besieged Marine company
Donald L. Rudd †	Navy	Hospitalman Second Class	near Khe Sanh, Quảng Trị Province	March 3, 1969	Rendered first aid to numerous wounded Marines, picking up weapons to fire back at the enemy. While shielding a Marine with his own body and firing at an enemy position, he was killed.
Robert C. Rusher †	Marine Corps	Corporal	Nuoc Ngot Village, Thừa Thiên Province	January 7, 1968	After killing two sappers who threw satchel charges at him and a fellow Marine, he placed his own body between the Marine and the satchel charges and was killed.
Timothy W. Russell	Marine Corps	Corporal	Cam Lo, Quảng Trị Province	February 2, 1968	Refused medical evacuation after being seriously wounded in order to direct the fire of his Marines and pinpoint enemy positions for five hours as the enemy assaulted Cam Lo District Headquarters
William E. Russell	Marine Corps	Captain	Quảng Trị Province	May 28–31, 1968	Led his company up a ridgeline in which they killed 65 of the enemy, and then directed his company in repulsing an NVA assault despite being wounded, killing another 140 of the enemy
John E. Rusth	Marine Corps	Corporal	Hill 110, Suoi Cho Valley	May 10, 1967	Led his Marines in an assault against NVA positions, and then assisted 10 wounded Marines to safety before collapsing from wounds and heat exhaustion

== S ==
This along with the †, indicates that the Navy Cross was awarded posthumously

Name	Service	Rank	Place of action	Date of action	Notes
Charles D. Sadler	Marine Corps	Corporal	South Vietnam	May 21, 1966	After his platoon sustained heavy casualties while being deployed in a landing zone, he consolidated the survivors into a defensive position as he delivered devastating machine gun fire on the enemy
Gerald H. Sampson †	Marine Corps	Captain	near Cam Lo, Quảng Trị Province	August 28, 1969	When his company faced a savage assault by an NVA force, he moved to the point of heaviest contact to rally his Marines and direct their fire
Thomas Sanders †	Marine Corps	Corporal	Tinh, Quảng Nam Province	May 10, 1967	Placed himself between enemy troops and wounded Marines and poured deadly machine gun fire on the enemy
George T. Sargent Jr. †	Marine Corps	Lieutenant Colonel	Quảng Nam Province	March 20–21, 1969	Led his battalion in a helicopter assault, single-handedly assaulting an enemy machine gun position. He was killed the following day while leading the final assault against the enemy.
Robert J. Schley †	Marine Corps	Corporal	Hill 881, Khe Sanh, Quảng Trị Province	April 30, 1967	Placed his machine gun team in a position where they could deliver the most effective fire on the enemy. After he was wounded twice, he continued to fire his machine gun alone.
Klaus D. Schreiber	Marine Corps	First Lieutenant	Thừa Thiên Province	October 14, 1967	Born in Germany. After his recon patrol was ambushed, he rescued a mortally wounded Marine under heavy fire and then called in danger close air strikes for eight hours.
Henry M. Schunck	Marine Corps	Corporal	Ngok Tavak, Quảng Tín Province	May 10, 1968	When an NVA battalion attempted to overrun his camp, he fired an 81-mm. mortar at the enemy and assisted a wounded comrade to safety despite being wounded twice
Donald W. Scott	Marine Corps	Sergeant	Village of Gia Binh	September 18, 1966	When his platoon was badly ambushed, he ran through enemy fire six times to assist three wounded Marines to safety and recover the bodies of three Marines despite being wounded twice
Ned E. Seath	Marine Corps	Lance Corporal	DMZ, Quảng Trị Province	July 16, 1966	Assembled an M-60 machine gun using the pieces of two disabled ones, and then used it to deliver devastating fire on the enemy
Roger D. See	Marine Corps	Corporal	South Vietnam	June 8–9, 1969	Silenced an enemy bunker and continually patrolled the defensive perimeter of his recon team despite being wounded
Charles T. Sexton	Marine Corps	Corporal	A Shau Valley	February 5, 1970	When his recon team was ambushed and all members wounded or killed except him, he directed the fire of his two remaining Marines and called in air strikes for several hours
Harry E. Sexton	Marine Corps	Lieutenant Colonel	South Vietnam	September 11–14, 1970	Inserted and extracted a friendly force into a landing zone under heavy fire
Merlyn A. Sexton	Marine Corps	Captain	near Khe Sanh, Quảng Trị Province	June 19 – July 8, 1968	Rallied his company in the defense of a ridgeline and directed air strikes, ultimately accounting for the deaths of 212 NVA soldiers
Burton H. Shepherd	Navy	Commander	Hanoi, North Vietnam	October 26, 1967	Led an 18-plane strike group in successfully bombing a heavily defended thermal power plant. He then searched for a missing pilot for one hour until low fuel forced him to retire
Andrew M. Sherman †	Marine Corps	Second Lieutenant	near Cam Lo, Quảng Trị Province	August 8, 1966	When his platoon was attacked by an overwhelming enemy force and sustained 50% casualties, he rallied his Marines and led a counterattack
Conrad A. Sipple †	Marine Corps	Corporal	near An Tuyet, Quảng Ngãi Province	March 6, 1966	Exposed himself to enemy fire on four occasions to assist wounded Marines to safety
Michael A. Sirousa †	Marine Corps	Private First Class	Quảng Nam Province	February 12, 1970	After directing the fire of his squad, he single-handedly assaulted enemy positions across a stream
David W. Skibbe †	Marine Corps	Second Lieutenant	Quảng Nam Province	March 2, 1970	Skillfully directed air strikes on the enemy which allowed the wounded to be extracted by a medical evacuation helicopter
Jeff C. Skweres	Marine Corps	Corporal	South Vietnam	June 1, 1970	Aerial gunner who spent one hour evacuating wounded Marines from a mine field while under fire
Albert C. Slater Jr.	Marine Corps	Captain	near Con Thien, Quảng Trị Province	July 6–7, 1967	Led two companies to a strategic position and repulsed two attacking NVA battalions, killing approximately 200 of the enemy with few losses among his own men
Robert M. S. Slater	Marine Corps	First Lieutenant	South Vietnam	January 5–11, 1968	Gathered valuable intelligence from enemy territory on three occasions
Duncan B. Sleigh †	Marine Corps	Second Lieutenant	Hill 55, Quảng Nam Province	November 6, 1968	Established a landing zone to evacuate wounded Marines and used his own body to shield a Marine from a rocket propelled grenade
Dennis M. Sliby	Marine Corps	Lance Corporal	Phu Bai area, Thừa Thiên Province	March 30–31, 1968	Smothered an enemy hand grenade with his own body and was critically wounded
Chester B. Smith	Navy	Signalman First Class	Mekong River	December 11, 1966	Led his PBR in a four hour battle which killed 15 of the enemy and destroyed 28 sampans and an ammunition cache
Homer L. Smith †	Navy	Captain	Hanoi and Bac Giang, North Vietnam	May 19–20, 1967	Led a strike force against heavily defended thermal power plants, during which he was shot down, captured and tortured to death
Ray L. Smith	Marine Corps	Captain	South Vietnam	March 30 – April 1, 1972	Led 28 Vietnamese Marines to safety after repulsing several NVA battalions
Stephen F. Snyder †	Marine Corps	Second Lieutenant	Thon Son Lam area, Quảng Trị Province	August 23–24, 1966	Led his platoon in a night march to relieve another besieged platoon, held off an enemy attack and then led his platoon in a counterattack
Thomas Soliz †	Marine Corps	Corporal	Quảng Trị Province	September 6, 1967	Manned a machine gun on top of an amphibian tractor and gained fire superiority over the enemy
Michael M. Spark †	Marine Corps	Colonel	near An Hoa, Quảng Nam Province	January 15, 1969	He was observing and directing an assault against enemy positions from a helicopter when it was shot down
Neil R. Sparks Jr.	Navy	Lieutenant, Junior Grade	near Hanoi, North Vietnam	July 17, 1967	Successfully rescued a pilot who was shot down over enemy territory
Paul H. Speer	Navy	Commander	North Vietnam	May 19, 1967	Led six F-8 aircraft in shooting down three MiGs, one of which he shot down himself
Jonathan N. Spicer †	Marine Corps	Private First Class	Khe Sanh, Quảng Trị Province	March 8, 1968	Used his own body to shield a wounded Marine from enemy mortar fire
Steve A. Srsen †	Marine Corps	Private First Class	Quảng Trị Province	January 27, 1967	Pushed another Marine to the ground to protect him from an enemy hand grenade
Clarence H. St. Clair Jr. †	Marine Corps	Corporal	Quảng Nam Province	August 28, 1969	Destroyed an enemy bunker despite being wounded and was advancing on a second when he was killed
Mykle E. Stahl	Marine Corps	Captain	Hill 861, Khe Sanh, Quảng Trị Province	January 21, 1968	Single-handedly assaulted an enemy trench and despite multiple wounds, succeeded in killing five of the enemy and capturing three more
Edward F. Starrett	Marine Corps	Lance Corporal	Que Son District, Quảng Nam Province	December 9, 1970	Despite being wounded multiple times, he succeeded in killing several enemy soldiers and prevented further penetration of the perimeter
Norman B. Stayton	Navy	Aviation Structural Mechanic Third Class	Can Gao Canal, Kien Giang Province	March 26, 1971	Jumped from his helicopter into a river covered in burning jet fuel to bring a life preserver to a wounded Sailor under enemy fire
Michael E. Stewart †	Marine Corps	Lance Corporal	Village of Phu An, Quảng Trị Province	May 13, 1967	Crawled 50 meters to a group of wounded Marines, helped a blinded Marine to safety, and returned to the group and was dragging a second man to safety when he was killed.
Robert D. Stockman	Marine Corps	Sergeant	South Vietnam	January 14, 1970	Assaulted and silenced two enemy bunkers and then carried a wounded man to safety before leading the platoon in an assault which caused the enemy to retreat
James H. Stogner	Marine Corps	Lance Corporal	South Vietnam	April 5, 1967	Was belatedly awarded the Navy Cross in 2019. He killed four enemy soldiers, who had captured and were torturing his machine gun team leader, in hand-to-hand combat
Guy E. Stone	Navy	Chief Shipfitter	near the Vinh Dien River	January 27, 1970	UDT member who discovered eight enemy soldiers hidden in the grass and killed six of them and captured the other two
Gerald M. Strode	Navy	Hospitalman Third Class	Quảng Ngãi Province	September 4–5, 1967	While rendering aid to wounded Marines, he fought off the enemy in hand-to-hand combat
James L. Stuckey	Marine Corps	Lance Corporal	Quảng Trị Province	July 6–7, 1967	When he threw three enemy hand grenades from his fire team's position, the third grenade exploded and severed his hand. Despite his painful wound, he refused evacuation and continued fighting throughout the night
Daniel F. Sullivan	Marine Corps	Corporal	Hamlet of Nam Pho Ha, Thừa Thiên Province	April 11, 1966	Threw himself on an enemy hand grenade and managed to throw it out of his position before it exploded
George R. Sullivan	Marine Corps	Second Lieutenant	near Dong Ha, Quảng Trị Province	March 17, 1967	Assaulted and silenced an enemy machine gun position and carried two wounded Marines to safety before he was wounded

== T–V ==
This along with the †, indicates that the Navy Cross was awarded posthumously

Name	Service	Rank	Place of action	Date of action	Notes
David A. Taft	Navy	Lieutenant Commander	near Da Nang, Quảng Nam Province	August 27, 1967	Surgeon who successfully amputated a wounded man's leg which had an armed 2.75-inch rocket imbedded in it
Jesse J. Taylor †	Navy	Lieutenant Commander	North Vietnam	November 17, 1965	Located a pilot who had been shot down and attacked anti-aircraft positions which threatened the search and rescue helicopter before he himself was shot down
Charles D. Thatcher	Marine Corps	Lance Corporal	Gio Linh, Quảng Trị Province	May 8, 1967	Pulled a wounded Marine from a burning tank, rendered aid, and fought off repeated enemy attacks for one hour. He then inflicted heavy casualties on the enemy with a machine gun.
Michael H. Thomas †	Marine Corps	Second Lieutenant	Hill 881S, Khe Sanh, Quảng Trị Province	January 20, 1968	Led his platoon to rescue the crew of a crashed helicopter and reinforce a beleaguered platoon across 500 meters of open terrain. He was then helped move six casualties to safety and was trying to assist two more when he was killed.
Robert J. Thomas	Navy	Radarman Second Class	Da Dung Mountain	March 23, 1969	When his helicopter was shot down, he pulled the two pilots from the burning wreckage despite multiple wounds to himself, and then fought off the enemy until they were rescued.
Brock I. Thompson	Marine Corps	Corporal	Bridge 11, Quảng Nam Province	October 19, 1969	After assuming command of his squad, he attempted to throw an enemy hand grenade from his position and was seriously wounded by the blast. He then refused medical care and continued to direct his squad.
Clinton W. Thompson	Marine Corps	Corporal	near Khe Sanh, Quảng Trị Province	March 13–14, 1969	Single-handedly assaulted and destroyed four enemy bunkers
Jerrald R. Thompson †	Marine Corps	Corporal	Hill 488, Quảng Tín Province	June 16, 1966	Despite being serious wounded by an enemy hand grenade, he engaged the enemy in hand-to-hand combat and killed two of them.
John C. Thompson	Marine Corps	Staff Sergeant	South Vietnam	April 30, 1964	Guided 18 aircraft to a landing zone under heavy fire to evacuate a besieged combat outpost
Robert H. Thompson	Marine Corps	Lieutenant Colonel	Huế City, Thừa Thiên Province	February 12 – March 3, 1968	Led his battalion in intense close-quarters fighting
Barry L. Thoryk	Marine Corps	Corporal	Hill 471, Khe Sanh, Quảng Trị Province	April 4, 1968	Single-handedly assaulted an enemy machine gun position and killed five of the enemy
Armand R. Thouvenell †	Marine Corps	Private First Class	DMZ, Quảng Trị Province	May 29, 1967	Provided covering fire which allowed his machine gun team to withdraw
James M. Timmons †	Marine Corps	Private First Class	Hill 55, Quảng Nam Province	November 6, 1968	After assisting three wounded Marines to safety, he shielded a man from enemy fire using his own body when he was killed.
Michael S. Tonkyn	Marine Corps	Lance Corporal	near An Hoa, Quảng Nam Province	June 11, 1969	Attacked a trench line captured by the enemy on four occasions, killing six of the enemy and dragging a wounded Marine to safety
Trần Văn Bảy †	Army of the Republic of Vietnam	Private First Class	Hieu Duc District, Quảng Nam Province	February 19, 1967	Pushed a Marine from the path of a booby trap, exposing himself to the explosion
William D. Trent †	Marine Corps	Lance Corporal	Quảng Nam Province	May 8, 1968	After placing his machine gun teams in positions, he personally manned one of the guns and silenced tow enemy positions and continued firing from his exposed position after he was mortally wounded.
Quincy H. Truett †	Navy	Chief Boatswain's Mate	Kinh Dong Tien Canal	January 20, 1969	Provided covering fire from his PBR while five Sailors were rescued from the water
James N. Tycz †	Marine Corps	Sergeant	near Khe Sanh, Quảng Trị Province	May 9, 1967	When his small recon team was attacked by an enemy platoon, he directed the fire of his men and called in artillery support. He then attempted to throw an enemy hand grenade away from a wounded Marine when he was critically wounded.
Willie D. Tyrone †	Marine Corps	Staff Sergeant	Quảng Ngãi Province	May 30–31, 1965	He assumed the role of senior advisor for a Vietnamese Ranger Battalion, and despite being mortally wounded, he persisted in killing 10 more of the enemy.
David F. Underwood	Marine Corps	Captain	near Dong Ha, Quảng Trị Province	February 16, 1968	Pilot who extracted five members of a Marine recon team while under heavy fire, during which his UH-34 helicopter sustained heavy damage
Phil I. Valdez †	Navy	Hospitalman Third Class	Da Nang, Quảng Nam Province	January 29, 1967	Corpsman who was mortally wounded by enemy fire while shielding a wounded Marine with his own body
Philip V. Vampatella	Navy	Lieutenant, Junior Grade	North Vietnam	June 21, 1966	Fighter pilot who shot down one MIG-17
Norman W. Vancor	Marine Corps	Lance Corporal	near Dong Ha Combat Base, Quảng Trị Province	May 7, 1969	Radio operator
Jesus R. Vasquez †	Marine Corps	Sergeant	Khe Sanh Combat Base, Quảng Trị Province	January 30, 1968	Explosive ordnance disposal technician who attempted to throw a burning 81-mm. mortar round out of an ammunition supply point
David A. Verheyn	Marine Corps	Lance Corporal	South Vietnam	February 3, 1967	Team leader

== W–Z ==
This along with the †, indicates that the Navy Cross was awarded posthumously

Name	Service	Rank	Place of action	Date of action	Notes
James R. Walker	Navy	Lieutenant	Mekong River	September 14, 1968	Light helicopter fire team leader
Ernie W. Wallace	Marine Corps	Lance Corporal	near Chu Lai, Quảng Tín Province	August 18, 1965	Machine gunner who personally killed 40 enemy troops
James C. Ward †	Marine Corps	Corporal	Quảng Nam Province	May 9, 1969	After knocking out an enemy emplacement during an ambush, he gave first aid to a wounded Marine, and was attempting to carry a second Marine to safety when he was killed.
Roger O. Warren	Marine Corps	Lance Corporal	Huế City, Thừa Thiên Province	February 3–10, 1968	Machine gunner
Bruce D. Webb †	Marine Corps	Captain	Quảng Ngãi Province	August 18, 1965	Company commander
James H. Webb Jr.	Marine Corps	First Lieutenant	Quảng Nam Province	July 10, 1969	After knocking out two bunkers, he shielded a Marine from a grenade using his own body. Despite painful wounds, he destroyed a third bunker.
William Weise	Marine Corps	Lieutenant Colonel	South Vietnam	April 30 – May 2, 1968	Battalion commander
Allen E. Weseleskey	Navy	Lieutenant Commander	Mekong Delta region	March 9, 1968	Attack helicopter fire team leader
Brian E. Westin	Navy	Lieutenant, Junior Grade	North Vietnam	April 27, 1966	A-6 Bombardier/Navigator
Warren R. Westphal	Navy	Boatswain's Mate First Class	Mekong River	November 24, 1968	PBR
Jeffrie E. Wiant Jr.	Navy	Lieutenant, Junior Grade	North Vietnam	August 30, 1968	Search and rescue helicopter pilot
Robert I. Widger	Marine Corps	Corporal	South Vietnam	June 7, 1969	Machine gun squad leader
Mack H. Wilhelm †	Navy	Hospitalman Third Class	Quảng Trị Province	February 19, 1969	Despite being wounded twice while treating and carrying a Marine to safety, he began assisting a second Marine when he was killed.
Franklin P. Willeford †	Navy	Hospitalman	Quảng Nam Province	December 14, 1968	Corpsman
James E. Williams	Navy	Boatswain's Mate First Class	Mekong River	January 15, 1967	PBR also received MOH
Lloyd T. Williams Jr.	Navy	Aircraftman First Class	South Vietnam	April 28, 1969	Crew chief and door gunner
Robert S. Williams	Marine Corps	First Lieutenant	Hill 362, Quảng Trị Province	July 24–25, 1966	Platoon commander
Willis C. Wilson	Marine Corps	First Lieutenant	Hamlet of Lap Thuan	April 2, 1966	Platoon commander
William C. Wirick †	Marine Corps	Corporal	Quảng Nam Province	December 8, 1968	Despite already being seriously wounded, he shielded another wounded Marine from sniper fire and was killed.
Lloyd Woods	Marine Corps	Corporal	Quảng Tín Province	June 2, 1967	Radio operator
Warren A. Work Jr.	Navy	Hospitalman Third Class	Quảng Nam Province	April 8, 1967	Corpsman
Edward H. Wynn	Marine Corps	Private First Class	Village of Nhi Ha (2), Quảng Trị Province	May 25, 1968	Radio operator
Vernon L. Yarber †	Marine Corps	Lance Corporal	near the Rockpile, Quảng Trị Province	August 26, 1968	Provided covering fire which allowed his squad to withdraw from a listening post when attacked by an NVA platoon
John C. Yates †	Marine Corps	Second Lieutenant	Cua Viet River, Quảng Trị Province	October 17, 1968	Communications chief who was fatally wounded while attempting to rescue Marines trapped inside a burning amphibian tractor
Charles R. Yordy	Marine Corps	Private First Class	Quảng Nam Province	May 24, 1968	For knocking out two enemy bunkers and covering the withdraw of his platoon during an ambush
William D. Young	Navy	Lieutenant	North Vietnam	August 6–7, 1972	Combat rescue helicopter co-pilot
William H. Young	Marine Corps	Lance Corporal	Village of Phu Tai, Quảng Trị Province	March 7, 1968	Radio operator
Jerrold M. Zacharias	Navy	Commander	Hanoi, North Vietnam	February 24, 1968	Pilot
Harry J. Zinser	Navy	Lieutenant	North Vietnam	August 6–7, 1972	Combat rescue helicopter pilot

== See also ==
- List of Medal of Honor recipients for the Vietnam War
- List of Navy Cross recipients for World War II
- List of Navy Cross recipients for the Korean War
