= Van D. Bell =

United States Marine Corps officer (1918–200(

Van D. Bell Jr.
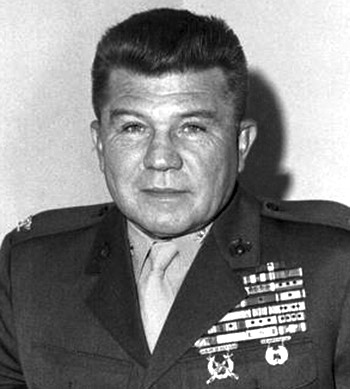
- Nickname: "Ding Dong Bell"
- Born: August 25, 1918; Atlanta, Georgia, US
- Died: June 3, 2009 (aged 90) Tupelo, Mississippi, US
- Buried: Arlington National Cemetery; Arlington, Virginia
- Allegiance: United States
- Branch: United States Marine Corps
- Service years: 1936–1975
- Rank: Colonel
- Commands: 1st Battalion, 1st Marines
- Conflicts: World War II; Guadalcanal campaign; Battle of Okinawa; Korean War; UN May–June 1951 counteroffensive; Vietnam War; Operation Stone; Operation Union
- Awards: Navy Cross (2); Silver Star (2); Legion of Merit with 'V' device Bronze Star with 'V' device' Purple Heart (5)

Van Daley Bell Jr. (August 25, 1918 – June 3, 2009) was a highly decorated United States Marine with the rank of colonel. He was the only Marine to be awarded the Navy Cross in the Korean War and a second award in the Vietnam War.

== Early career ==
Van D. Bell was born in Atlanta, Georgia, on August 25, 1918. Bell enlisted in the Marines on March 13, 1936 and attended Marine Corps Recruit Depot Parris Island. Afterwards, he was assigned to the 4th Marine Regiment in China, before serving on board the USS Augusta, where he was Admiral Harry E. Yarnell's bodyguard.

With the outbreak of World War II, Bell was soon promoted to master sergeant and participated in the battle of Guadalcanal with 1st Marine Division and the battles of Bougainville, Guam, and Okinawa with 3rd Marine Division. After the war, he was commissioned a lieutenant and returned to China in January 1947 where he remained until May 1949. He was then assigned to the Marine barracks in Newport, Rhode Island from June 1949 to February 1951.

== Korean War ==
In March 1951, First Lieutenant Bell deployed to Korea and was assigned as Executive Officer of B Company, 1st Battalion, 7th Marines and later as Commanding Officer of A Company. In April, he was awarded his first Silver Star for carrying a wounded marine 400 yards to safety while under heavy fire.

On May 29, he took command of a platoon after it took several casualties and led it in an assault on an enemy-held ridge, knocking out three enemy bunkers. While assaulting a fourth bunker, Bell was wounded in the face by a grenade, but he continued leading his platoon until wounded again in the leg. He was awarded his first Navy Cross for his actions, and was later wounded again in October and sent back to the United States.

== Vietnam War ==
Lieutenant Colonel Bell deployed to Vietnam with the 1st Battalion, 1st Marines in December 1965. On June 6, 1966, he led three M50 Ontos vehicles into enemy territory to relieve a platoon that was heavily engaged with the enemy. His leadership repelled the enemy and resulted in 30 enemy deaths. While returning to base, the lead Ontos struck a mine and was destroyed, wounding Bell. The enemy then launched an ambush on the remaining vehicles, but Bell was able to lead his Marines in fighting them off. For his actions, he was awarded his second Navy Cross.

Bell extended his tour in South Vietnam for another six months in early 1967. While in Vietnam, Bell was popular among reporters and photographers for giving them straight facts. He was also given the nickname "Ding Dong Bell." In February 1967, he led his battalion across a river during Operation Stone, in which over 200 enemy soldiers were killed and dozens of prisoners were taken. Lieutenant Colonel Bell was awarded his second Silver Star for his leadership. He later took part in Operation Union before leaving Vietnam in July 1967.

== Later career and life ==
Bell served at numerous duty stations after leaving Vietnam, including the Marine Barracks at USNB Guantanamo Bay, and Camp Smedley Butler in Okinawa, Japan. Colonel Bell retired after 39 years of service on July 1, 1975. Van D. Bell died on June 3, 2009, in Tupelo, Mississippi. He is buried in Arlington National Cemetery.

== Awards and decorations ==

Navy Cross w/ 5/16" Gold Star		Silver Star w/ 5/16" Gold Star
Legion of Merit w/ Combat "V"	Bronze Star Medal w/ Combat "V"	Purple Heart w/ five 5/16" Gold Stars
Combat Action Ribbon w/ two 5/16" Gold Stars	Navy and Marine Corps Presidential Unit Citation w/ three 3/16" Bronze Stars	Navy Unit Commendation
Marine Corps Good Conduct Medal w/ 3/16" Bronze Star	China Service Medal w/ 3/16" Bronze Star	American Defense Service Medal
American Campaign Medal	Asiatic-Pacific Campaign Medal w/ four 3/16" Bronze Stars	World War II Victory Medal
National Defense Service Medal w/ one 3/16" Bronze Star	Korean Service Medal w/ three 3/16" Bronze Stars	Vietnam Service Medal w/ four 3/16" Bronze Stars
Republic of Vietnam Gallantry Cross w/ 5/16" Gold Star and two Palms	Republic of Korea Presidential Unit Citation	Republic of Vietnam Gallantry Cross Unit Citation
United Nations Korea Medal	Vietnam Campaign Medal	Republic of Korea War Service Medal

=== 1st Navy Cross citation ===

First Lieutenant Van Daley Bell, Jr.
U.S. Marine Corps
Date Of Action: May 29, 1951

The President of the United States of America takes pleasure in presenting the Navy Cross to First Lieutenant Van Daley Bell, Jr., United States Marine Corps, for extraordinary heroism in connection with military operations against an armed enemy of the United Nations while serving as Executive Officer of Company B, First Battalion, Seventh Marines, First Marine Division (Reinforced), in action against enemy aggressor forces in the vicinity of Hwach'on, Korea, on 29 May 1951. Accompanying the reserve platoon during the initial phase of his company's assault against a series of strongly defended hostile positions on a steep, rocky ridgeline, First Lieutenant Bell was quick to act when the leading elements suddenly came under devastating automatic weapons and small-arms fire and the platoon leader and several men became casualties. Moving quickly forward through the intense barrage, he assumed command of the disorganized platoon and, effecting a prompt and skillful reorganization, spearheaded an attack to neutralize three enemy bunkers in succession. Blown from his feet and painfully wounded by a bursting grenade upon reaching the fourth, heavily fortified emplacement, he succeeded in regaining his feet and, although partially blinded from facial wounds, led a final charge to capture the hill. Refusing medical attention, he continued at the head of his platoon to another ridge in pursuit of the fleeing enemy and, although wounded in the leg during the advance, personally directed machine-gun fire on the remaining hostile positions to the front, staunchly refusing assistance until the position had been consolidated. By his valiant leadership, indomitable fighting spirit and tenacious perseverance in the face of tremendous odds, First Lieutenant Bell served as an inspiration to all who observed him, and his selfless devotion to duty throughout the bitter action was in keeping with the highest traditions of the United States Naval Service.

=== 2nd Navy Cross citation ===

Lieutenant Colonel Van Daley Bell, Jr.
U.S. Marine Corps
Date Of Action: June 6, 1966

The President of the United States of America takes pleasure in presenting a Gold Star in lieu of a Second Award of the Navy Cross to Lieutenant Colonel Van Daley Bell, Jr., United States Marine Corps, for extraordinary heroism while serving as Commanding Officer, First Battalion, First Marines, FIRST Marine Division (Reinforced), Fleet Marine Force, in the Republic of Vietnam on 6 June 1966. Lieutenant Colonel Bell led a small complement consisting of himself, ten Marines and three Ontos deep into enemy controlled territory to personally take charge of one of his platoons that was heavily engaged in enemy fire. Arriving on the scene with the battle still in progress, he immediately employed the fire of the Ontos to suppress the enemy fire and called in artillery fire inflicting heavy casualties on the enemy and causing them to withdraw. He then proceeded through extremely hazardous terrain to visit Company B, which had recently established a patrol base well within the enemy stronghold. En route, one of the Ontos ran out of fuel, causing the small group to be stranded adjacent to the enemy-controlled village of Phong Ho (2). Realizing the seriousness of the situation, he immediately established a hasty defense and called for fuel resupply by helicopter. The helicopter arrived with the fuel and as it began to depart, the landing zone was attacked with heavy enemy small-arms fire. Lieutenant Colonel Bell directed the fire of his small unit to suppress the enemy fire and protect the helicopter. Almost simultaneously, the small unit was brought under a withering hail of small arms and automatic weapons fire from three sides in an all out effort by the enemy to annihilate the small group. With complete disregard for his own personal safety, he moved from Ontos to Ontos pinpointing targets and encouraging his men. With full knowledge of the risk involved, he elected to keep the enemy engaged rather than withdraw while he maneuvered a platoon from more than a mile away to trap the enemy. This valiant and daring action was a resounding success and resulted in over thirty enemy killed and the capture of sixteen weapons. With darkness drawing near, Lieutenant Colonel Bell elected to return to his Command Post. At a point located two miles from friendly units, the lead Ontos hit an enemy mine, totally destroying it and causing severe injuries to Lieutenant Colonel Bell and three other Marines. Again the enemy brought the group under fire and although in considerable pain, he gallantly rallied his small remaining force of seven, and once more repelled an enemy attack. Upon sighting the relief column and realizing that the safety of the remainder of his group was assured, he calmly called in a helicopter and directed the evacuation of himself and the other wounded Marines. Through his dynamic leadership, inspiring valor and loyal devotion to duty, Lieutenant Colonel Bell reflected great credit upon himself and the Marine Corps and upheld the highest traditions of the United States Naval Service.

== See also ==
- List of Navy Cross recipients for the Korean War
- List of Navy Cross recipients for the Vietnam War
