= William H. Dabney =

United States Marine Corps officer (1934-2012)

William Howard Dabney
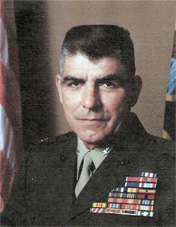
- Born: September 28, 1934; Saint John, New Brunswick, Canada
- Died: February 15, 2012 (aged 77); Lexington, Virginia, U.S.
- Spouse: Virginia McCandlish Puller
- Military career
- Allegiance: United States
- Branch: United States Marine Corps
- Service years: 1954–June 30, 1990
- Rank: Colonel
- Nickname: Bill
- Commands: India Company (India & Mike Company, Hill 881S, Khe Sanh), 3rd Battalion, 26th Marines, 3rd Marine Division (Reinforce)
- Conflicts: Vietnam War: Battle of Khe Sanh (Hill 881 South)
- Awards: Navy Cross; Silver Star Medal; Legion of Merit (2); Bronze Star Medal (2); Purple Heart Medal
- Other work: VMI commandant of cadets (1989–1990)

William Howard Dabney (September 28, 1934 – February 15, 2012) was a colonel in the United States Marine Corps. He was awarded the Navy Cross for extraordinary heroism in the Vietnam War. He also served as the Commandant of Cadets at Virginia Military Institute (VMI) from 1989 to 1990.

== Biography ==
Dabney was born as William Wagner in Saint John New Brunswick, Canada on September 28, 1934, to Victor William Wagner (1894–1972) and Mary Hennessey Wagner (1902–1990). His mother remarried Hugh Keane Dabney (1893-1972) on May 5, 1945, in Henrico Co., Virginia and his surname was changed to Dabney. He was raised in The Republic of Panama and in Gloucester County, Virginia, graduating from Christchurch School in Middlesex County, Virginia in 1953. He attended Yale University 1953–54, then enlisted in the USMC, and later graduated from Virginia Military Institute in 1961 and was an initiate of the Beta Commission of Kappa Alpha Order. In that same year, Dabney married Virginia McCandlish Puller, daughter of Lieutenant General Lewis Burwell "Chesty" Puller in September 1961.

=== U.S. Marine Corps ===
He enlisted in the U.S. Marine Corps (USMC) in 1954. He was discharged with the rank of sergeant and enlisted in the Marine Corps Reserve (USMCR) in 1957. He attended Virginia Military Institute (VMI), graduating in 1961. He was commissioned in the Marine Corps in 1960. He was married to Virginia McCandlish Puller in September 1961. She was the daughter of the legendary Marine Corps general, Lewis Burwell "Chesty" Puller.

=== Vietnam ===
Dabney served two tours of duty in South Vietnam (RVN) during the Vietnam War. On his first tour from 1967 to 1968, he was in command of India Company, 3rd Battalion, 26th Marines, stationed on Hill 881 South during the Battle of Khe Sanh. Dabney was awarded the Silver Star for action on January 20, 1968, on Hill 881 South. In 2005, Dabney was awarded the Navy Cross for his actions on Hill 881 South from January 21 to April 14, 1968. He also received a Bronze Star Medal and a Republic of Vietnam Gallantry Cross for actions during that same time period. On his second tour from 1970 to 1971, he was a senior adviser for a Vietnamese Marine infantry battalion, Khe Sanh, South Vietnam. Dabney was awarded a second Bronze Star, two Navy and Marine Corps Commendation Medals, a Purple Heart Medal, and a second RVN Gallantry Cross. Dabney was also a central character in Kenton Michael’s Historical Fiction 1968.

=== Post-Vietnam ===
He received the Defense Meritorious Service Medal during his service as Chief of the Combat Operations Center, National Emergency Airborne Command Post, Offutt Air Force Base, Nebraska, 1980–1981.

He received the Legion of Merit while serving as Commanding Officer, Headquarters Battalion, Headquarters, Marine Corps, Henderson Hall which is now is part of Joint Base Myer–Henderson Hall, 1984–1987.

He also served as the Commandant of Cadets at Virginia Military Institute from 1989 to 1990 and was the Commanding Officer of VMI's NROTC Unit from 1987 to 1990. Dabney retired June 30, 1990.

=== Death ===
Dabney died February 15, 2012, at his home, Mackey’s Tavern, in Lexington, Virginia.

Dabney's experiences are the basis for the central character, Captain Dabney, commanding officer on Hill 881 near Khe Sanh during the siege of Khe Sanh in the Historical Fiction novel titled "1968" by Kenton Michael.

== Awards and decorations ==
Dabneys' decorations and medals include:

Navy Cross		Silver Star	
Legion of Merit with one gold award star	Bronze Star Medal with Combat "V", one gold award star	Purple Heart	Good Conduct Medal
Navy Commendation Medalwith Combat V and award star	Joint Meritorious Unit Award with oak leaf cluster	Navy Unit Commendation with one bronze service star	Navy Meritorious Unit Commendation
National Defense Service Medal with service star	Armed Forces Expeditionary Medal	Joint Service Achievement Medal	United States Navy Presidential Unit Citation ribbon with service star
Vietnam Service Medal	Vietnam Civil Actions Unit Citation with palm	Vietnam Campaign Medal with 60-	Vietnamese Gallantry Cross with one silver star
Vietnam Staff Service Medal ribbon-First class	Vietnam Armed Forces Honor Medal-First Class	Vietnamese Gallantry Cross with palm unit awards	Sea Service Deployment Ribbon

== See also ==
- List of Navy Cross recipients for the Vietnam War
