= Lawrence H. Livingston =

United States Marine Corps Major General and recipient of the Purple Heart medal

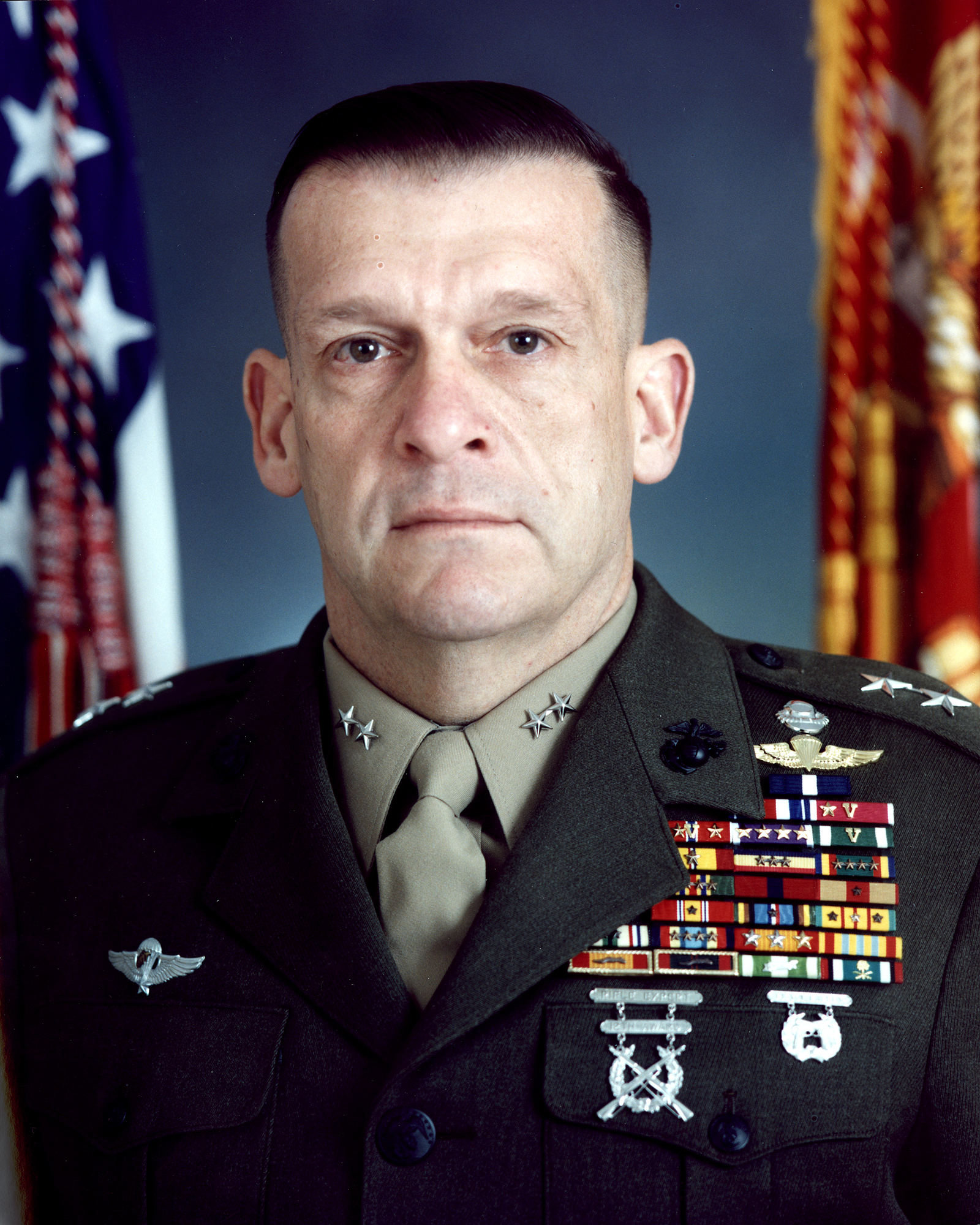
- Major General Lawrence H. Livingston
- Born: November 5, 1940; Defiance, Ohio, U.S.
- Died: September 28, 2018 (aged 77); San Diego, California, U.S.
- Military career
- Allegiance: United States of America
- Branch: United States Marine Corps
- Service years: 1960-1997
- Rank: Major General
- Commands: 3rd Battalion, 4th Marines; 6th Marine Regiment; Marine Corps Base Camp Lejeune; 2nd Marine Division
- Conflicts: Vietnam War; Operation Desert Storm
- Awards: Navy Cross; Silver Star; Legion of Merit (2); Bronze Star (4); Purple Heart (5)

Lawrence H. Livingston (November 5, 1940 – September 28, 2018) was a decorated United States Marine Corps Major General. Livingston was a combat veteran — receiving the Navy Cross for his heroic actions during the Vietnam War, as well as the Silver Star, two Legions of Merit, four Bronze Stars and five Purple Hearts.

== Marine Corps Career ==
Larry Livingston was born November 5, 1940 in Defiance, Ohio. After a year playing football at college, he decided he wanted to be a Marine parachutist, enlisted in the Marine Corps in 1960, went to boot camp at Parris Island, then infantry training at Camp Geiger. He was then sent to San Diego to electronics school before returning to Camp Lejeune, initially with a tank battalion, and finally 2d Force Recon. He left the Marines in 1965, did a short stint in the Reserves, and returned to active duty to deploy to Vietnam, where he joined the 1st Force Recon Company at Camp Reasoner in 1967. In 1968, he went to OCS in Quantico, got married, and went to MATA at Fort Bragg. In 1971, he returned for a second tour as an adviser to the South Vietnamese marines. He notes that his radio training served him well throughout his service because communications was key, and that his tank training came in handy later in his career. Livingston recalls Operation UNION I in the Que Son Valley, napalm, CS gas, and learning the valuable lesson that “you have to listen to the people that are in it.” He remembers Hue City, the Tet Offensive, strobe lights in Happy Valley, an MIA corpsman. He comments on Saigon, the Splendide Hotel, tiger stripes, tractors and water buffalo, Leatherneck Square, and the Easter Offensive. And he tells the story of Firebase Pedro, and the actions for which he was awarded the Navy Cross.

He completed multiple tours of duty with 1st Marine Division in the Republic of Vietnam, where he served as a squad leader, platoon sergeant, platoon commander and company gunnery sergeant. Livingston was wounded multiple times and multiple decorations for Valor as noted below. He was RECON qualified and Vietnamese Jump Master.

Livingston was commissioned as a second lieutenant in 1968 via the Meritorious NCO Program. Upon completion of The Basic School in 1968, he was assigned to the 5th MEB, and 3rd Marine Division, where he served as a platoon commander. Livingston served a second tour in Vietnam as an Advisor with the Vietnamese Marine Corps. Livingston was awarded the Silver Star Medal for heroism in April 1972 and the Navy Cross for heroism in July 1972. Capt. Livingston was on the line with then Capt. John Ripley, advising South Vietnamese Marines when the "Bridge at Dong Ha" (read the book) was destroyed. Col. John Ripley USMC is the only Marine in the Army Ranger Hall of Fame.

Upon his return from Vietnam, Livingston was assigned to Marine Corps Recruit Depot San Diego as company commander, battalion operations officer and regimental operations officer. In late 1976, he was assigned to the 5th Marine Regiment where he served as company commander, battalion operations officer, and battalion executive officer. He was subsequently reassigned to Director of Division Schools. During this tour, he was promoted to major in July 1978.

Upon completion of the Armed Forces Staff College, Norfolk,Virginia, in 1980, General Livingston was assigned to MCCDC, Quantico, where he served as Tactics Group Chief and Operations Officer of The Basic School until May 1983. His next assignment was Operations Officer, Marine Aircraft Group 15, 1st Marine Aircraft Wing. He was promoted to lieutenant colonel in October 1983.

Ordered to the 2d Marine Division, Camp Lejeune, upon completion of his exchange assignment, he served briefly as Regimental Executive Officer of the 6th Marine Regiment and then two years as Commanding Officer of 3d Battalion, 4th Marines.

From 1986 to 1987, he was a student at the National War College in Washington, D.C. He was next assigned to Headquarters Marine Corps, where he served as Head of both the Joint Strategic Planning Branch and the Eastern Regional Branch of the Plans Division. While at Headquarters, he was promoted to colonel in September 1989. He was assigned duty as the Commanding Officer, 6th Marines at Camp Lejeune in 1990. His regiment spearheaded the assault into Kuwait and the recapture of Kuwait City for the 2d Marine Division during Operation Desert Storm. While serving in this capacity, he was selected in December 1991 for promotion to brigadier general. General Livingston was assigned duty as the Assistant Deputy Chief of Staff for Force Structure Implementation, Plans, Policies and Operations Department, Headquarters, Marine Corps in February 1992. He assumed duties as the Commanding General, Marine Corps Base, Camp Lejeune, North Carolina, in July 1992. He was advanced to his final grade in February 1995. He assumed his last assignment in June 1995 as the Commanding General, 2d Marine Division, Marine Forces, Atlantic, Camp Lejeune, North Carolina.

His numerous staff assignments include student at Armed Forces Staff College, Norfolk,Virginia (1979 to 1980); Tactics Group Chief and Operations Officer of The Basic School, Marine Corps Combat Development Command (1980 to 1983); Operations Officer, Marine Aircraft Group 15, 1st Marine Aircraft Wing; student at the National War College in Washington, D.C (1986 to 1987) and Assistant Deputy Chief of Staff for Force Structure Implementation, Plans, Policies and Operations Department, Headquarters Marine Corps (1992 to 1995). He was selected for promotion to brigadier general in December 1991 and promoted to major general in February 1995. He assumed his last assignment in June 1995 as the Commanding General, 2nd Marine Division, Camp Lejeune, North Carolina.

== Awards and honors ==
His personal decorations include:

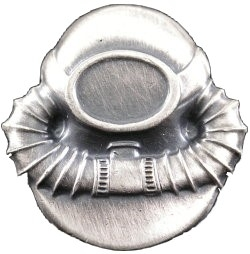
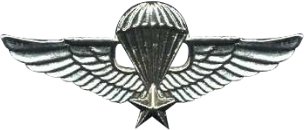

SCUBA Diver Insignia; Navy and Marine Corps Parachutist Insignia; Vietnam Parachutist Badge
1st Row	Navy Cross		Silver Star	Legion of Merit w/ 1 award star & Combat "V"
2nd Row	Bronze Star w/ 3 award stars & Combat V	Purple Heart w/ 4 award stars	Navy and Marine Corps Commendation Medal w/ Combat V	Combat Action Ribbon w/ 1 award star
3rd Row	Navy Presidential Unit Citation w/ 3 service stars	Navy Unit Commendation w/ 4 service stars	Navy Meritorious Unit Commendation w/ 4 service stars	Marine Corps Good Conduct Medal
4th Row	Marine Corps Expeditionary Medal w/ 1 service star	National Defense Service Medal w/ 1 service star	Armed Forces Expeditionary Medal w/ 1 service star	Vietnam Service Medal w/ 7 service stars
5th Row	Southwest Asia Service Medal w/ 2 service stars	Navy Sea Service Deployment Ribbon w/ 4 service stars	Vietnam Gallantry Cross w/ 1 gold and 2 silver stars	Vietnam Armed Forces Honor Medal 1st Class
6th Row	Vietnam Gallantry Cross unit citation	Vietnam Civil Actions unit citation	Vietnam Campaign Medal	Kuwait Liberation Medal (Saudi Arabia)

=== Navy Cross citation ===
LIVINGSTON, LAWRENCE H.
Captain, U.S. Marine Corps
Advisor (Attached), 1st Vietnamese Marine Corps Infantry Battalion
Date of Action: July 11, 1972

The Navy Cross is presented to Lawrence H. Livingston, Captain, U.S. Marine Corps, for extraordinary heroism on 11 July 1972 while serving as Senior Advisor to the 1st Vietnamese Marine Corps Infantry Battalion during a heliborne assault into enemy-held territory northeast of Quang Tri City, Republic of Vietnam. When the battalion encountered unexpectedly heavy enemy fire while disembarking into the landing zone, and sustained numerous casualties, Captain Livingston moved throughout the hasty positions taken by the scattered and hesitant element and formed the Marines into an assault force. Despite the continuing heavy concentration of hostile fire, he began the assault on the initial objective - a treeline approximately 50 yards distant. Although blown from his feet by explosions and periodically delayed to reform and redirect his casualty-riddled force, he forged ahead, leading the Vietnamese Marines into the enemy-infested trench lines of the objective and a subsequent hand-to-hand battle. Upon seizure of the initial portion of the trench line, Captain Livingston shed his combat equipment, emerged from the trench line, and exposed himself to a hail of enemy fire to reach and carry his wounded naval gunfire spotter to a position of relative safety. Captain Livingston's repeated acts of heroism in the face of heavy enemy fire reflected great credit upon himself and the Marine Corps and were in keeping with the highest traditions of the United States Naval Service.

(Note: from his Aide De Camp when BGen CamLej: MGen. Livingstons Navy Cross would have been a Medal of Honor if another American had survived the battle in order to testify as to the heroic acts that substantiated the award.)

=== Silver Star citation ===
The President of the United States of America takes pleasure in presenting the Silver Star to Captain Lawrence Herbert Livingston (MCSN: 0-107447), United States Marine Corps, for conspicuous gallantry and intrepidity in action while serving in the Republic of Vietnam on 12 April 1972 as the Assistant United States Marine Advisor to the First Infantry Battalion, Vietnamese Marine Corps. Captain Livingston and the company of Marines with which he was participating in a search operation, having just taken a prisoner for interrogation, were ambushed by a Vietnamese platoon. Within thirty seconds intense enemy fire had killed the Vietnamese Officer in Charge and killed or wounded all but two of the friendly forces in the immediate area. Without hesitation and with complete disregard for his own safety, Captain Livingston braved intense enemy fire to recover the body of the Vietnamese officer and to remove several wounded to a protected area. Then, realizing that the prisoner would be able to provide intelligence, he questioned him and learned the enemy disposition. By organizing the resistance of his Vietnamese comrades, he ensured that the company was able to drive off the North Vietnamese. Captain Livingston's courageous and decisive action immediately following the death of the Vietnamese commander not only resulted in the withdrawal of the enemy platoon, saving an untold number of friendly casualties, but enabled the Vietnamese Marines, with the aid of supporting artillery fire, to inflict serious damage to a larger enemy unit nearby. Captain Livingston's devotion to duty, courage under fire and exemplary professionalism were in keeping with the highest traditions of the United States Naval Service.

== See also ==
- List of Navy Cross recipients for the Vietnam War
- List of 2nd Marine Division commanders
