= Karl Marlantes =

American writer (born 1944)

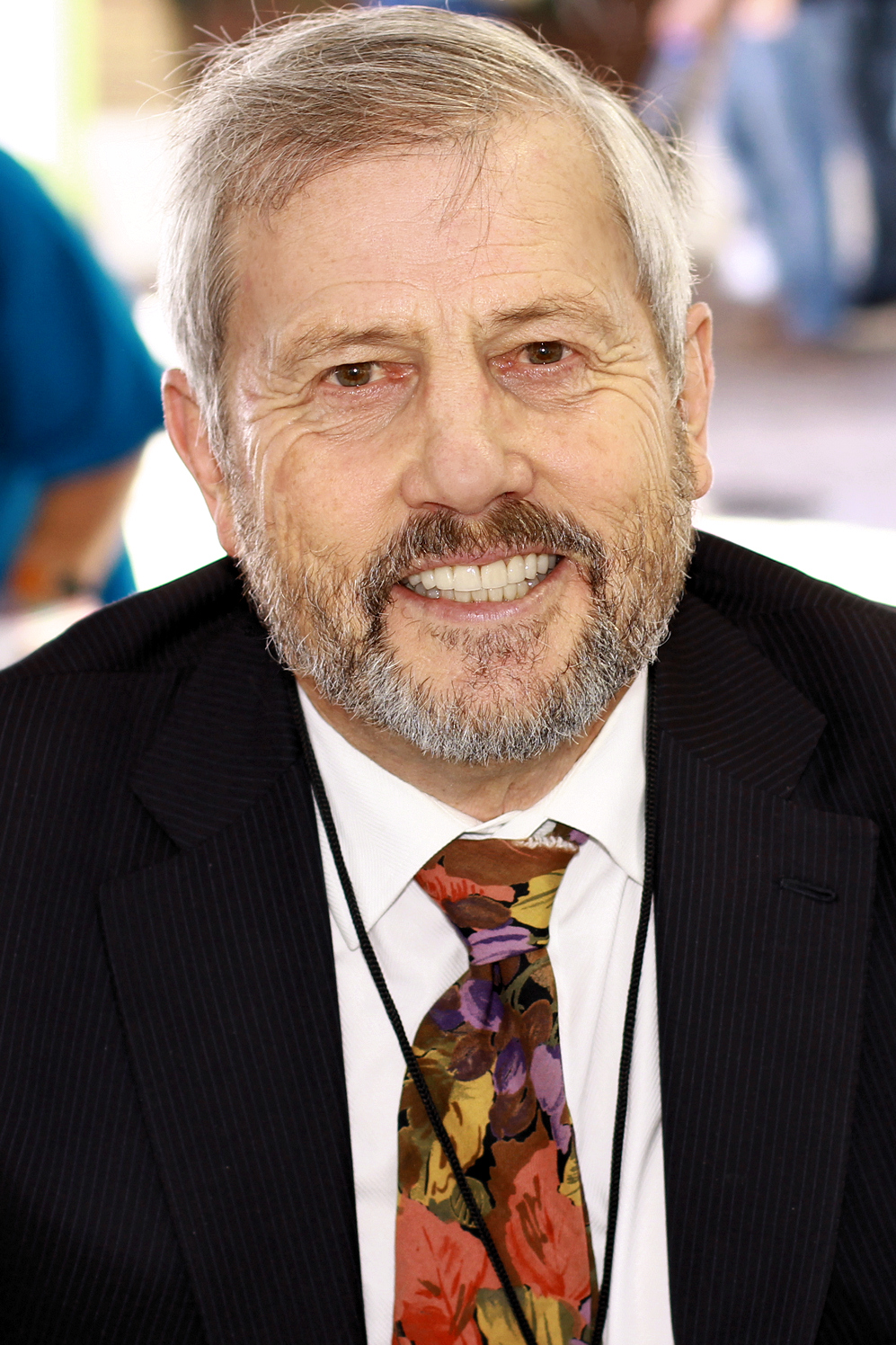
- Marlantes at the 2019 Texas Book Festival
- Born: Karl Arthur Marlantes; December 24, 1944 (age 81); Astoria, Oregon, U.S.
- Education: Yale University; University College, Oxford
- Occupation: Author
- Notable work: Matterhorn (2010); What it is Like to go to War (2011); Deep River (2019)
- Awards: Rhodes Scholarship; Flaherty-Dunnan Prize; Indies Choice Book Awards; James Webb Award; WA State Book Award; William E. Colby Award
- Military career
- Allegiance: United States of America
- Branch: United States Marine Corps
- Service years: 1964–1970
- Rank: First Lieutenant
- Unit: 1st Battalion, 4th Marines
- Wars: Vietnam War
- Awards: Navy Cross

Karl Arthur Marlantes (born December 24, 1944) is an American author and Vietnam War veteran. He has written four books: Matterhorn: A Novel of the Vietnam War (2010), What It Is Like to Go to War (2011), Deep River (2019), and Cold Victory (2024).

== Biography ==
=== Early life ===
Marlantes grew up in Seaside, Oregon, a small, coastal logging town. He played football and was student body president at Seaside High School, from which he graduated in 1963. His father was the school principal.

He won a National Merit Scholarship and attended Yale University, where he was a member of Jonathan Edwards College and Beta Theta Pi, and played as wing forward in the rugby team. During his time at Yale, Marlantes trained in the Marine Corps Platoon Leaders Class. He was awarded a Rhodes Scholarship at University College, Oxford. He returned to Oxford after his military service and earned a master's degree.

=== Vietnam War ===
Marlantes left after one semester at Oxford to join active duty in the U.S. Marine Corps as an infantry officer. He served during the Vietnam War with 1st Battalion, 4th Marines from October 1968 to October 1969, and was awarded the Navy Cross for action in Vietnam in which he led an assault on a hilltop bunker complex. He also served as an aerial observer while in Vietnam. Marlantes was also awarded a Bronze Star, two Navy Commendation Medals for valor, two Purple Hearts, and 10 Air Medals.

He served another year of active duty at Marine Corps Headquarters after his combat tour. He has post-traumatic stress disorder.

Marlantes is featured in Ken Burns' and Lynn Novick's 10-part documentary series, The Vietnam War (2017), where he reflects on his experiences during the war.

=== Literary career ===
Marlantes is the author of Matterhorn: A Novel of the Vietnam War (2010). Sebastian Junger of The New York Times declared Matterhorn: "one of the most profound and devastating novels ever to come out of Vietnam – or any war". It received the 2011 Washington State Book Award in the fiction category. The novel is based on Marlantes' combat experience in the Vietnam War.

His next book was What It Is Like to Go to War, a biographical non-fiction work published in 2011 about his return to the civilian world and modern veteran life in general.

Marlantes's novel Deep River (2019) was published in July 2019. It follows a Finnish family which flees Finland and settles in the Pacific Northwest in a logging community. The story examines the logging industry and labor movements of the early 1900s and rebuilding a family in America while balancing family tradition.

== Personal life ==
Marlantes is married with 3 daughters.

== Published works ==
- —— (2010). Matterhorn: A Novel of the Vietnam War. New York: Atlantic Monthly Press. ISBN 9780802119285.
- —— (2011). What It Is Like to Go to War. New York: Atlantic Monthly Press. ISBN 9780802119926.
- —— (2019). Deep River. New York: Atlantic Monthly Press. ISBN 9780802125385.
- —— (2024). Cold Victory. New York: Grove Press. ISBN 9780802161420.

== Footnotes ==
Sources

- Lamb, B. (host) (September 19, 2011). "Karl Marlantes". Q&A. C-SPAN. Transcript.
