= William H. Brockman Jr. =

U.S. Navy commander (1904–1979)

William Herman Brockman Jr.
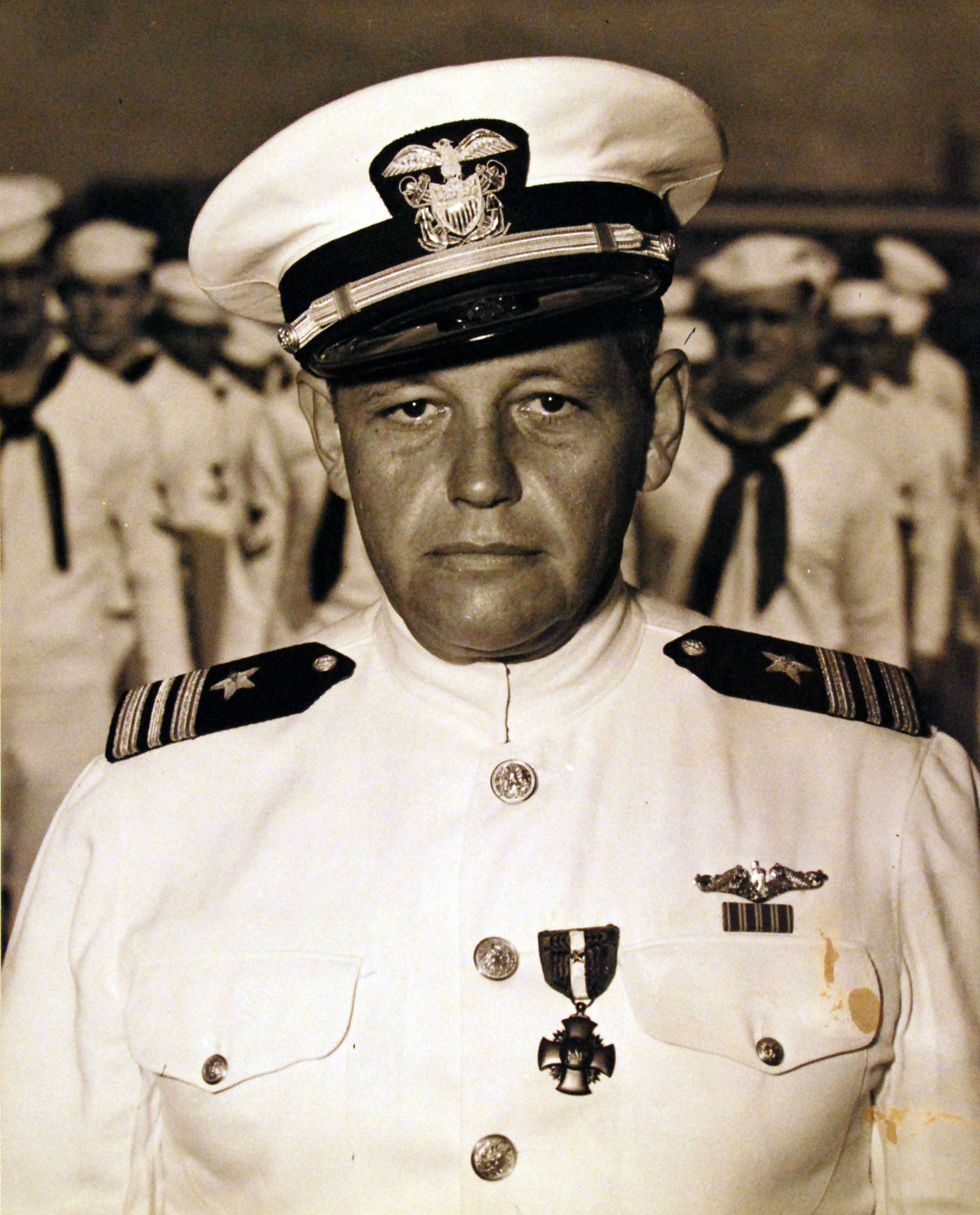
- William H. Brockman in November 1942
- Born: November 18, 1904; Baltimore, Maryland, U.S.
- Died: February 1, 1979 (aged 74); Boca Raton, Florida, U.S.
- Military career
- Allegiance: United States of America
- Branch: United States Navy
- Service years: 1922–1947
- Rank: Rear admiral
- Commands: USS Mallard (AM-44); USS Nautilus (SS-168); USS Cahaba (AO-82)
- Conflicts: World War II: Battle of Midway
- Awards: Navy Cross (3)

Rear Admiral William Herman Brockman Jr. (November 18, 1904 – February 1, 1979) served in the United States Navy during World War II.

== Biography ==
Brockman was born at Baltimore, Maryland. Enlisting in the Naval Reserve in 1922, he was appointed to the U.S. Naval Academy a year later and graduated in 1927. Creed Burlingame, Eugene Lindsey, and John Thatch were some of his classmates. He specialized in submarines from 1929 onward and commanded the submarine rescue ship Mallard (ASR-4) in 1938–39.

Lieutenant Commander Brockman was commanding officer of Nautilus (SS-168) during the June 1942 Battle of Midway and in subsequent operations, earning the Navy Cross with two gold stars for himself and the Presidential Unit Citation for his ship during this period.

After a year with the Submarine Force, Atlantic Fleet, Brockman was a submarine division commander from September 1944 to December 1945, receiving promotion to the rank of captain in March 1945. He commanded Cahaba (AO-82) until February 1946, then served in Seventh Fleet and Navy headquarters staff positions until retiring in November 1947.

Promoted to rear admiral upon retirement, Brockman was active in business for many years thereafter.

Brockman died at Boca Raton, Florida, aged 74.

Admiral Brockman was a recipient of the Navy Cross with two gold stars, Silver Star, Navy Presidential Unit Citation, Second Nicaraguan Campaign Medal, American Defense Service Medal, Asiatic-Pacific Campaign Medal, and World War II Victory Medal.

== Navy Cross Citation ==
The President of the United States of America takes pleasure in presenting the Navy Cross to Lieutenant Commander William Herman Brockman Jr. (NSN: 0–61342), United States Navy, for extraordinary heroism and distinguished service in the line of his profession as Commanding Officer of the U.S.S. NAUTILUS (SS-168), in the Battle of Midway. On 4 June 1942, Lieutenant Commander Brockman aggressively developed a contact with major enemy forces and doggedly pushed home a torpedo attack on a screened aircraft carrier against determined and repeated enemy counter measures by gunfire barrage, depth charging and bombing from the air. The attack culminated successfully and Lieutenant Commander Brockman is credited with closing and sinking of a 10,000 ton enemy aircraft carrier. His skill, determination, courage and fortitude were in keeping with the highest traditions of the Naval Service.

== In popular culture ==
Brockman, credited as the commander of the Nautilus, appeared in Camel cigarette advertising in 1955.

Brockman was portrayed by James Carpinello in the 2019 film Midway.
