= Creed Burlingame =

United States admiral (1905–1985)

Creed Cardwell Burlingame
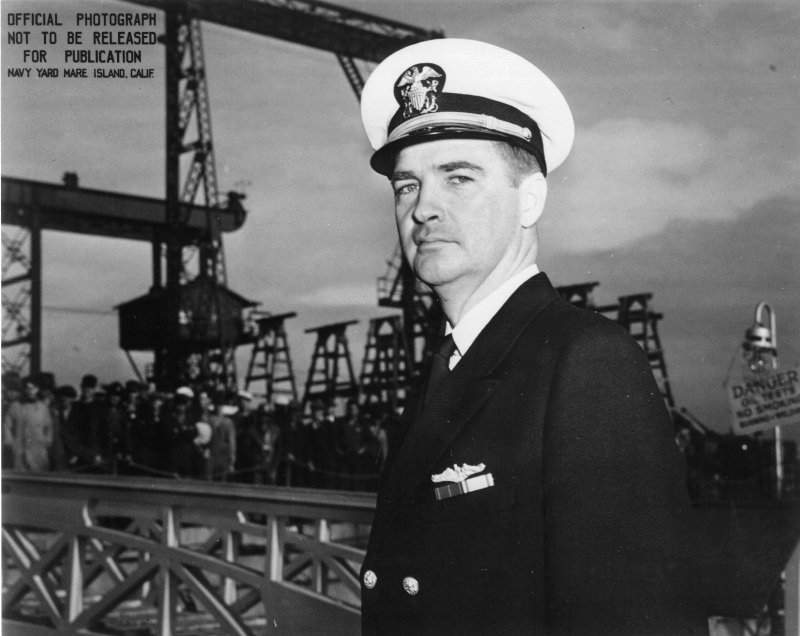
- Lieutenant Commander Burlingame at the Silversides' commissioning ceremony at Mare Island, 15 December 1941.
- Born: 27 February 1905; Louisville, Kentucky, U.S.
- Died: 21 October 1985 (aged 80); Perry Point, Maryland, U.S.
- Burial place: Arlington National Cemetery
- Military career
- Allegiance: United States
- Branch: United States Navy
- Service years: 1927–1957
- Rank: Rear Admiral
- Nickname: Burly
- Commands: USS Roanoke; Submarine Division 182; USS Silversides; USS S-30; USS S-36
- Conflicts: World War II
- Awards: Navy Cross (3); Silver Star (2); Legion of Merit

Creed Cardwell Burlingame (27 February 1905 – 21 October 1985) was a Rear Admiral in the United States Navy. He served as a submarine commander in the Pacific Theater during World War II.

== Early life ==
Burlingame was born in Louisville, Kentucky, on 27 February 1905, and grew up in the Midwest.

== Naval career ==
In June 1927, Burlingame graduated from the United States Naval Academy as an ensign and served aboard the battleship USS Utah. Some of his classmates were William Brockman, Eugene Lindsey, and John Thatch. He subsequently graduated from the Submarine School in New London, Connecticut, in 1930. He served as a submarine officer in service with the Asiatic fleet, and served aboard one of the few United States submarines stationed at the China station. Submarine-related commands immediately prior to and during World War II included captain of the USS S-36 from 8 May 1936 to 1 January 1939, duty at Submarine Base New London from 1 July 1939 to 1 July 1940, captain of the USS S-30 from 31 August 1940 to 7 December 1941, commissioning and first commanding officer of the USS Silversides from 15 December 1941 to 20 July 1943, commander of Submarine Division One Hundred Eighty Two from 1 November 1943 to 15 July 1945, and acting commander of Submarine Squadron Eighteen from 17 December 1944 to 8 January 1945.

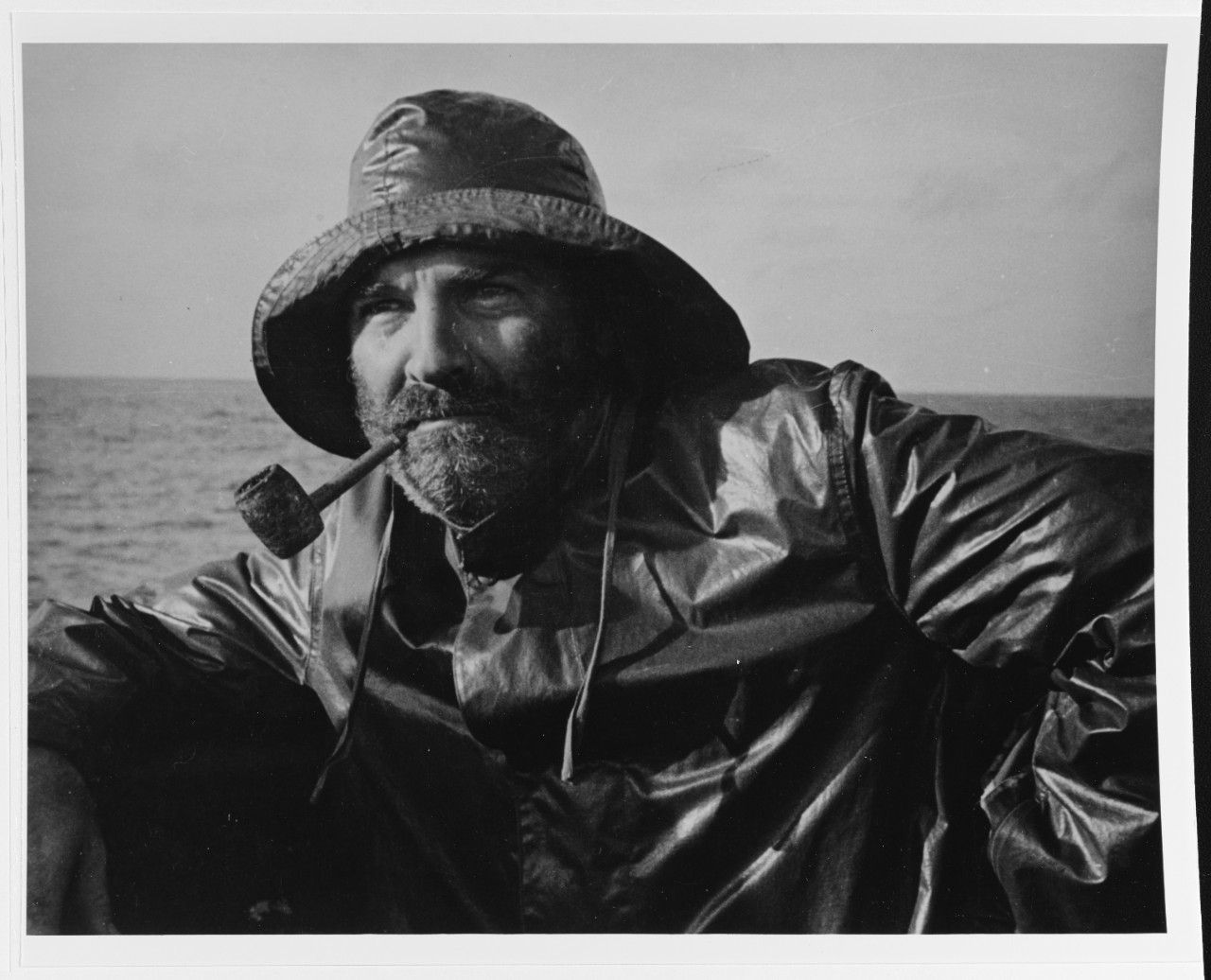
Burlingame while on combat patrol, 1942

After the Japanese attack on Pearl Harbor, Burlingame was immediately transferred to the USS Silversides for its commissioning at Mare Island, California on 15 December 1941. It was his sixth submarine and third command. After a brief shakedown off the California coast, he sailed Silversides for Hawaii, arriving at Pearl Harbor on 4 April 1942, and left for his first combat patrol on 30 April. He was promoted to commander on 10 September. Burlingame commanded Silversides for a total of five patrols, sinking eight enemy ships for a total 44,000 tons. While commanding the Silversides, the ship and crew received a presidential citation and Burlingame earned two Silver Stars and three Navy Crosses. As commander of the 182d Submarine Division in the Pacific, he was awarded the Legion of Merit.

Following World War II, Burlingame served in various assignments, including command of USS Roanoke from 15 September 1953, to 3 March 1955. He retired in 1957, at the rank of rear admiral.

== Awards and decorations ==

Submarine Warfare insignia
Navy Cross w/ two 5/16" Gold Stars
Silver Star w/ 5/16" Gold Star	Legion of Merit	Navy Presidential Unit Citation w/ 3/16" Bronze Star
China Service Medal	American Defense Service Medal w/ Fleet Clasp (3/16" Bronze Star)	American Campaign Medal
Asiatic–Pacific Campaign Medal w/ 3/16" Silver Star	World War II Victory Medal	National Defense Service Medal

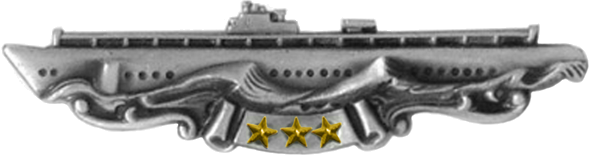

Submarine Combat Patrol Insignia

=== Navy Cross citations ===
==== First ====
For extraordinary heroism and distinguished service in the line of his profession as Commanding Officer of the U.S.S. SILVERSIDES (SS-236), during the FIRST War Patrol of that vessel in the immediate vicinity of the enemy Japanese homeland during the period 30 April 1942 to 21 June 1942. Despite vigorous anti-submarine measures on the part of the enemy, Lieutenant Commander Burlingame, availing himself of every attack opportunity with courageous skill and efficiency, succeeded in sinking one 1,400-ton Japanese submarine and a total of 24,227 tons of enemy merchant shipping. After two offensives, the SILVERSIDES became a constant target for aggressive and prolonged counterattacks by the Japanese, but, under capable leadership and resourceful command, she came through without serious material damage. Lieutenant Commander Burlingame's calm fortitude and conscientious devotion to duty were in keeping with the highest traditions of the United States Naval Service.

==== Second ====
For extraordinary heroism and distinguished service in the line of his profession as Commanding Officer of the U.S.S. SILVERSIDES (SS-236), during the SECOND War Patrol of that vessel in enemy controlled waters during the period 15 July 1942 to 8 September 1942. Despite strong enemy countermeasures and unfavorable sea conditions, Lieutenant Commander Burlingame took advantage of every opportunity to strike the enemy and in a series of skillfully conducted attacks succeeded in sinking 15,250 tons of enemy shipping and seriously damaging an additional 5,750 tons, without casualty to personnel of his own command. Through his experience and sound judgment Lieutenant Commander Burlingame brought his ship safely back to port. His conduct throughout was an inspiration to his officers and men and in keeping with the highest traditions of the United States Naval Service.

==== Third ====
For extraordinary heroism in the line of his profession as Commanding Officer of the U.S.S. SILVERSIDES (SS-236), on the FOURTH War Patrol of that submarine during the period 17 December 1942 to 31 January 1943, in enemy Japanese-controlled waters. Skilled and tireless in the performance of duty, Captain Burlingame courageously launched a series of brilliant torpedo attacks to sink four enemy ships totaling 27, 785 tons and damaged an enemy submarine of 1995 tons. By his effective evasive tactics, he succeeded in escaping severe hostile countermeasures and in bringing his ship safe to port. Captain Burlingame's leadership, courage and devotion to the completion of each perilous mission reflect the highest credit upon himself, his command and the United States Naval Service.

=== Silver Star citations ===
==== First ====
For conspicuous gallantry and intrepidity in action as Commanding Officer of the U.S.S. SILVERSIDES (SS-236), during the THIRD War Patrol of that vessel in enemy-controlled waters, from 2 October 1942 to 25 November 1942. Commander Burlingame displayed outstanding skill and courage in two attacks upon the enemy. On 19 October a large, 11,200-ton cargo ship was attacked and sunk from a submerged position. With great care, the Commanding Officer successfully evaded the patrol boats which headed for SILVERSIDES and escaped a short depth charge attack unscathed. Again on 9 November, SILVERSIDES distinguished herself by attacking, after a quick set-up, an enemy destroyer. Two successful attacks finally sent this ship to the bottom. Thus one freighter and one man of war were sunk, totaling 12,500 tons. It is noteworthy that, for five weeks of this patrol, SILVERSIDES lacked the use of her gyro compass. Navigation in poorly charted waters and attacks were made with the use of a magnetic compass. His conduct throughout was an inspiration to the officers and men in his ship, and was in keeping with the highest traditions of the United States Naval Service.

==== Second ====
For conspicuous gallantry and intrepidity in action as Commanding Officer of the U.S.S. SILVERSIDES (SS-236), during the FIFTH War Patrol of that vessel during the period 17 May 1943 to 1 July 1943. Commander Burlingame skillfully performed a successful mine laying operation under hazardous conditions. By boldly entering shallow waters which were constantly patrolled by enemy air and surface craft, he succeeded inlaying an important minefield in an area through which enemy shipping was routed. On 11 June, a 10,000-ton freighter-transport was sunk following a brilliant and daring surface attack. With great skill, SILVERSIDES evaded a dangerous, gun firing escort, submerged, and received a heavy depth charge attack. His conduct throughout was an inspiration to his officers and men and was in keeping with the highest traditions of the United States Naval Service.

=== Legion of Merit citation ===
For exceptionally meritorious conduct in the performance of outstanding services to the Government of the United States from November 1943 to March 1945, as Commander Submarine Divisions ONE EIGHTY-ONE and ONE EIGHTY-TWO, attached to Commander Submarines, SEVENTH Fleet. Captain Burlingame displayed outstanding ability in the training and refitting of submarines under his command, and was instrumental in the imposing record compiled by the ships of his division. During his command 50 ships were sunk, including heavy cruisers, two light cruisers and a large number of mine layer ships. Under his capable direction many submarines were refitted in such manner as to reflect credit upon him as the commanding officer. His leadership and high devotion to duty were an inspiration to the officers and men serving with him. His conduct throughout was in keeping with the highest traditions of the United States Naval Service.
