= Battleships in World War II =

Use of battleships during World War II

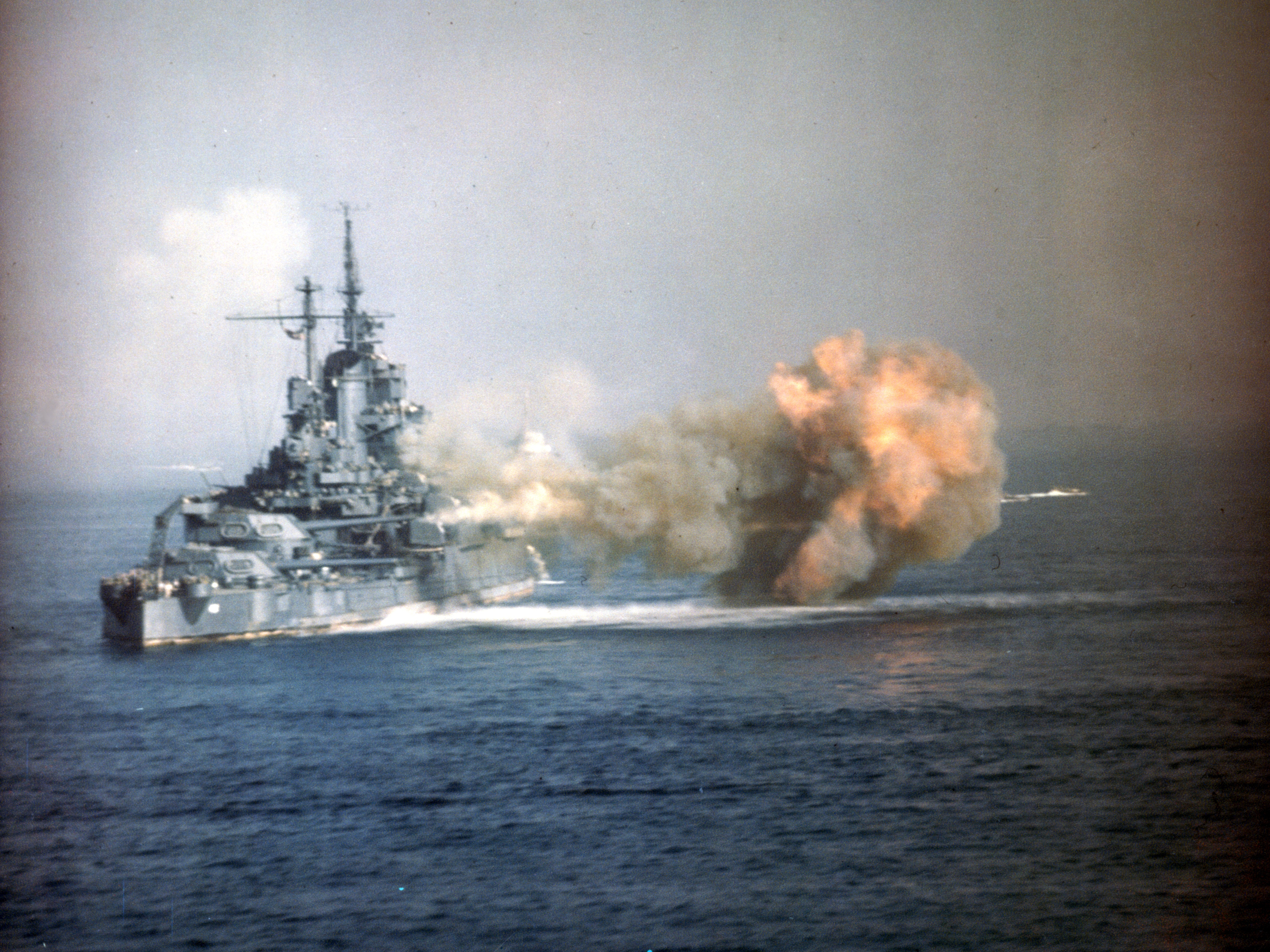
USS Idaho bombarding Okinawa in 1945

World War II saw the end of the battleship as the dominant force in the world's navies. At the outbreak of the war, large fleets of battleships—many inherited from the dreadnought era decades before—were one of the decisive forces in naval thinking. By the end of the war, battleship construction was all but halted, and almost every remaining battleship was retired or scrapped within a few years of its end.

Some pre-war commanders had seen the aircraft carrier as the capital ship of the future, a view which was reinforced by the devastating Pearl Harbor attack in 1941. The resultant Pacific War saw aircraft carriers and submarines take precedence. There were just two engagements in the Pacific Theater when battleships fought each other, and only three such engagements in the Atlantic. Instead, they were used to add to fleet air defense, for shore bombardment, and in several cases as fixed port defense batteries.

Battleships remained the most heavily protected ships afloat; nonetheless, sixteen were sunk or crippled by bombs or torpedoes delivered by aircraft, while three more were sunk by submarine-launched torpedoes. The war also saw the development of the first guided bombs, which would make it much easier for aircraft to sink battleships in the future.

== Operations ==
=== European theater ===
==== Baltic and North Seas ====
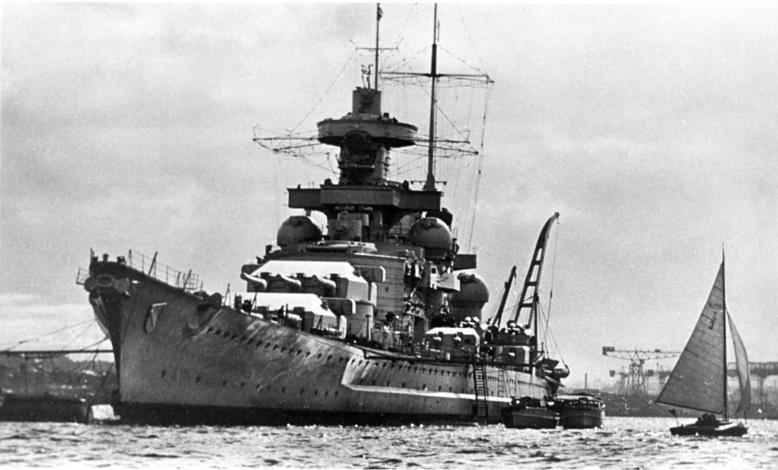
Scharnhorst in port

The German pre-dreadnought battleship Schleswig-Holstein fired the first shots of World War II by initiating the bombardment of the Polish garrison at Westerplatte in the early hours on 1 September 1939. Over the course of the month, Schleswig-Holstein shelled Polish positions around the base, and was later joined there by her sister ship Schlesien before the Poles eventually surrendered.

On 14 October 1939, the German U-boat U-47 entered the British Royal Navy's anchorage at Scapa Flow and torpedoed the battleship HMS Royal Oak, sinking her with two torpedoes. In November, the German battleships Scharnhorst and Gneisenau sortied to attack British vessels off the Faroe Islands, and encountered the auxiliary cruiser HMS Rawalpindi, which they sank before returning home.

After the Soviet Union attacked Finland in late 1939 in the Winter War, the Soviet battleships Marat and Oktyabrskaya Revolutsiya bombarded a Finnish coastal artillery battery in December 1939. They inflicted little damage before being driven off by several near misses. The Gulf of Finland iced over soon thereafter, preventing any further operations.

During Operation Weserübung, the German invasion of Denmark and Norway in April 1940, Scharnhorst and Gneisenau were sent as part of the covering force for the units targeting Narvik and Trondheim, Norway. On 9 April, they briefly skirmished with the British battlecruiser HMS Renown before fleeing. Later during the Norwegian campaign, Scharnhorst and Gneisenau caught the British aircraft carrier HMS Glorious and a pair of escorting destroyers; they sank all three ships in a short action. Scharnhorst was hit by a torpedo launched by one of the destroyers, however, and had to return to Germany for repairs that lasted for six months.

After Germany invaded the Soviet Union in Operation Barbarossa in June 1941, Marat and Oktyabrskaya Revolutsiya withdrew to Leningrad, where they supported the Soviet defenses during the Siege of Leningrad that lasted from 1941 to 1944. In September 1941, German Junkers Ju 87 dive bombers sank Marat in the harbor, though her upper works were still above water and she remained in operation as a stationary artillery battery through the remainder of the siege. Oktyabrskaya Revolutsiya was also struck by German bombers several times throughout the siege, but she too remained in action.

After having returned to Germany for repairs in January 1942 (by way of the Channel Dash), Gneisenau was badly damaged by British heavy bombers in an air attack in March. The decision was made to replace the ship's 28.3 cm (11 in) guns with 38 cm (15 in) guns, but the project was postponed after Adolf Hitler forbade further naval construction after the Battle of the Barents Sea in December 1942. Gneisenau was eventually scuttled at the end of the war and was then broken up in the late 1940s.

==== Battle of the Atlantic ====
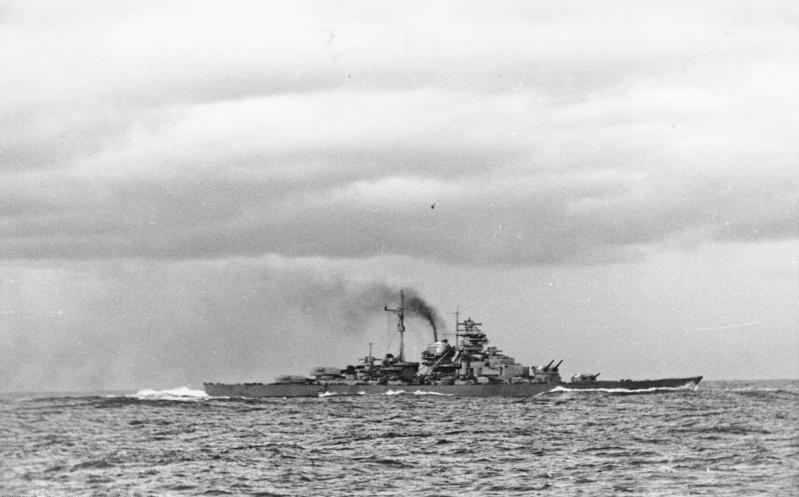
Bismarck as seen from Prinz Eugen after the Battle of the Denmark Strait

At the start of the war, Germany had deployed its large heavy cruisers of the Deutschland class as commerce raiders in the Atlantic, hoping to interrupt supplies from the Americas to Europe. Numerous British and French warships were deployed to try to catch them, including the two French Dunkerque-class battleships.

In January 1941, Scharnhorst and Gneisenau sortied again, this time breaking out into the north Atlantic in Operation Berlin, with the goal of attacking convoys bringing supplies to Britain. The ships had mixed success during the operation, which lasted into March, but two of the convoys they attempted to attack were escorted by British battleships—HMS Ramillies in one instance and HMS Malaya in the other—which dissuaded them from attacking the merchant vessels. During a later attack, one of the merchant ships radioed for assistance, which brought the battleships HMS King George V and HMS Rodney to the scene, prompting the Germans to flee. The Germans then sailed for Brest in occupied France, where they were subjected to numerous British air raids.

The Germans followed up Operation Berlin with Operation Rheinübung, a sortie by the recently completed battleship Bismarck and the heavy cruiser Prinz Eugen, in May 1941. At the Battle of the Denmark Strait on 24 May, Bismarck and Prinz Eugen engaged the British battlecruiser Hood and battleship Prince of Wales; Bismarck quickly destroyed Hood and damaged Prince of Wales, forcing her to temporarily withdraw, but was damaged by Prince of Wales in return. Other British forces eventually tracked Bismarck, and Swordfish torpedo-bombers from HMS Ark Royal slowed her down enough that King George V and Rodney caught and destroyed Bismarck in her final action.

The loss of Bismarck and the threat of repeated air attacks on the two Scharnhorst-class battleships at Brest led the German naval command to forbid further sorties into the Atlantic and to return the ships to home waters. They made the Channel Dash in January 1942, successfully returning to Germany, though both were damaged by mines in the operation.

==== Mediterranean Sea ====
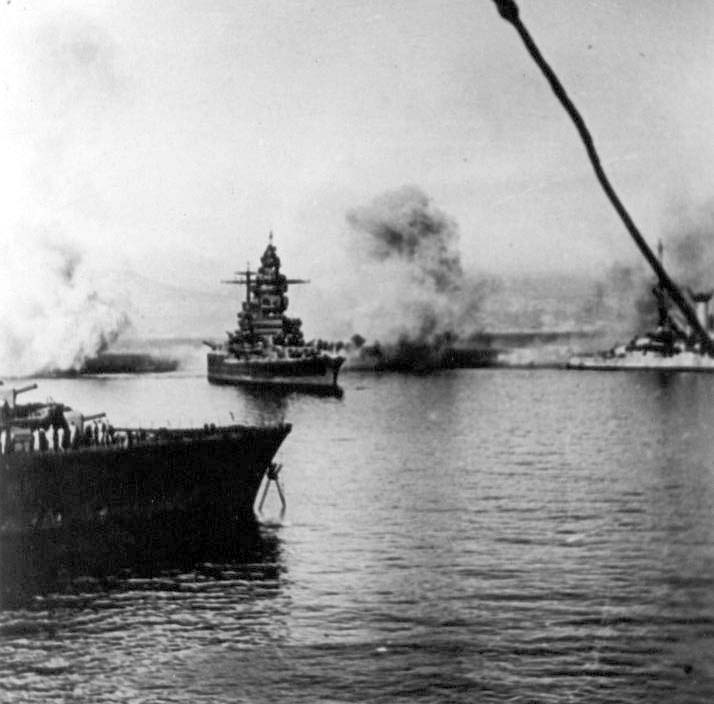
Strasbourg slips her moorings and makes for open water while under fire from the British Force H during the Attack on Mers-el-Kébir

Following the fall of France in June 1940, most of France's battleships were based in ports in France's African colonies. The two Dunkerque-class battleships were stationed at Mers-el-Kébir, along with the old battleships Bretagne and Provence. Under the mistaken impression that Germany planned to seize the French battleships, Britain embarked on a campaign to either compel the French to defect to the Free French or scuttle their ships, and if the French refused, they would sink them. In the Attack on Mers-el-Kébir, the British battleships Resolution and Valiant and battlecruiser Hood inflicted serious damage to Dunkerque and Provence and sank Bretagne, though Strasbourg was able to escape to Toulon, France. The battleship Lorraine was interned under British control. In September, the British battleships Barham and Resolution attempted to sink the battleship Richelieu in the Battle of Dakar, but they broke off the attempt after Resolution was badly damaged by a French submarine.

As the North African campaign intensified, British attention turned to its main opponent in the Mediterranean, the Italian Regia Marina. The Italians possessed a formidable fleet that included two Conte di Cavour and two Andrea Doria-class battleships, both modernized World War I-era ships, and two modern Littorio-class battleships. Italian operations were hampered by a desire to protect their fleet, though they still undertook numerous operations to attack British supply convoys in the central Mediterranean. These resulted in several battles, including the inconclusive Battle of Calabria in July 1940, where the battleships Giulio Cesare and Conte di Cavour engaged the British Warspite, Royal Sovereign, and Malaya. In November, the British launched a nighttime carrier raid on the main Italian naval base at Taranto; in the Battle of Taranto, British torpedo-bombers sank Conte di Cavour and damaged Littorio and Caio Duilio.

In March 1941, the Italians sortied to attack British forces, resulting in the Battle of Cape Matapan. The Italian battleship Vittorio Veneto was torpedoed and damaged, as was the heavy cruiser Pola. Vittorio Veneto returned to port, but Pola and two other heavy cruisers were caught by Valiant, Warspite, and Barham, which annihilated the cruisers in a close-range night fight. Littorio took part in the First and Second Battles of Sirte. In the latter engagement, she damaged several British destroyers.

During the Allied invasion of French North Africa in November 1942, the American battleship USS Massachusetts engaged the incomplete French battleship Jean Bart in the Naval Battle of Casablanca. Massachusetts disabled Jean Bart's one operational gun turret, ending that phase of the battle. Later that month, when Germany occupied the rest of Vichy France in response to the French surrender in North Africa, the French scuttled the fleet in Toulon, by which time Dunkerque had been repaired and had rejoined her sister there. Both ships were sunk in the action. Provence had also been returned to Toulon, and she was scuttled as well. By that time, fuel shortages had severely curtailed the operations of the Italian surface fleet, and they saw little activity in late 1942 and early 1943. By that time, the battleship Roma had been completed. After Italy exited the war with the Armistice of Cassibile in September 1943, German bombers using Fritz X guided bombs sank Roma and damaged Littorio on their way to internment at Malta.

==== Arctic operations ====
Tirpitz (1941)

By 1942, combat operations had arrived in the Arctic Ocean, as the Western Allies had begun sending supply convoys to aid the Soviet Union fighting Germany on the Eastern Front. Battleships, including King George V and the American Washington, were routinely deployed to escort the convoys to protect them from German surface ships.

Soon after the ship was completed, the German battleship Tirpitz was sent to occupied Norway to attack the Allied convoys to the Soviet Union, deter an Allied invasion of Norway, and to tie down British naval forces by acting as a fleet in being. The ship saw little activity, and only notable success came against Convoy PQ 17, though Tirpitz did not engage the convoy. Instead, when the Allies learned that Tirpitz had sortied, they dispersed the convoy, which allowed U-boats and Luftwaffe bombers to sink 21 of the 34 transports.

Scharnhorst was deployed to join Tirpitz in Norway in early 1943, but fuel shortages curtailed any offensive operations for much of the year. In December, the ship went to sea with several destroyers to attack one such convoy, and after briefly skirmishing with British cruisers in the Battle of the North Cape, Scharnhorst was attacked and disabled by the British battleship HMS Duke of York. Scharnhorst was then sunk by torpedoes from Allied destroyers.

Tirpitz was repeatedly attacked by British naval and air forces throughout 1943 and 1944, most notably by midget submarines in Operation Source in September 1943, which inflicted serious damage, and by Avro Lancaster heavy bombers in Operation Catechism, which sank the ship in December 1944. In the latter attack, the British used 12,000-pound (5,400 kg) Tallboy bombs to destroy the ship.

==== Allied offensives in France ====
Numerous American and British battleships were assigned to the bombardment forces supporting the Allied invasion of Normandy in June 1944. These included the American Arkansas, Texas, and Nevada and the British Warspite, Ramillies, and Rodney. The battleships' substantial firepower proved invaluable in disabling heavily protected German coastal batteries, which were difficult to target from the air. Additionally, by suppressing the larger German guns, the battleships provided cover for smaller cruisers and destroyers to close with the shore and engage smaller guns that were directly attacking the soldiers as they went ashore. The battleships' long range also allowed them to bombard concentrations of German forces further inland that were organizing for counter-attacks. The heavy naval bombardment contributed to the comparatively light Allied casualties among the ground forces. Over the course of the Normandy campaign, the battleships Nelson and Malaya were also sent to reinforce the bombardment group.

In August, Lorraine, Arkansas, Texas, Nevada, and Ramillies formed the core of the bombardment group that supported Operation Dragoon, the invasion of southern France. Operations here lasted for some two weeks before the Allies seized the naval base at Toulon and the port of Marseille. Over the following months, Lorraine repeatedly shelled German positions along the Mediterranean and Atlantic coasts of France as Allied ground units fought their way across the country.

=== Pacific theater ===
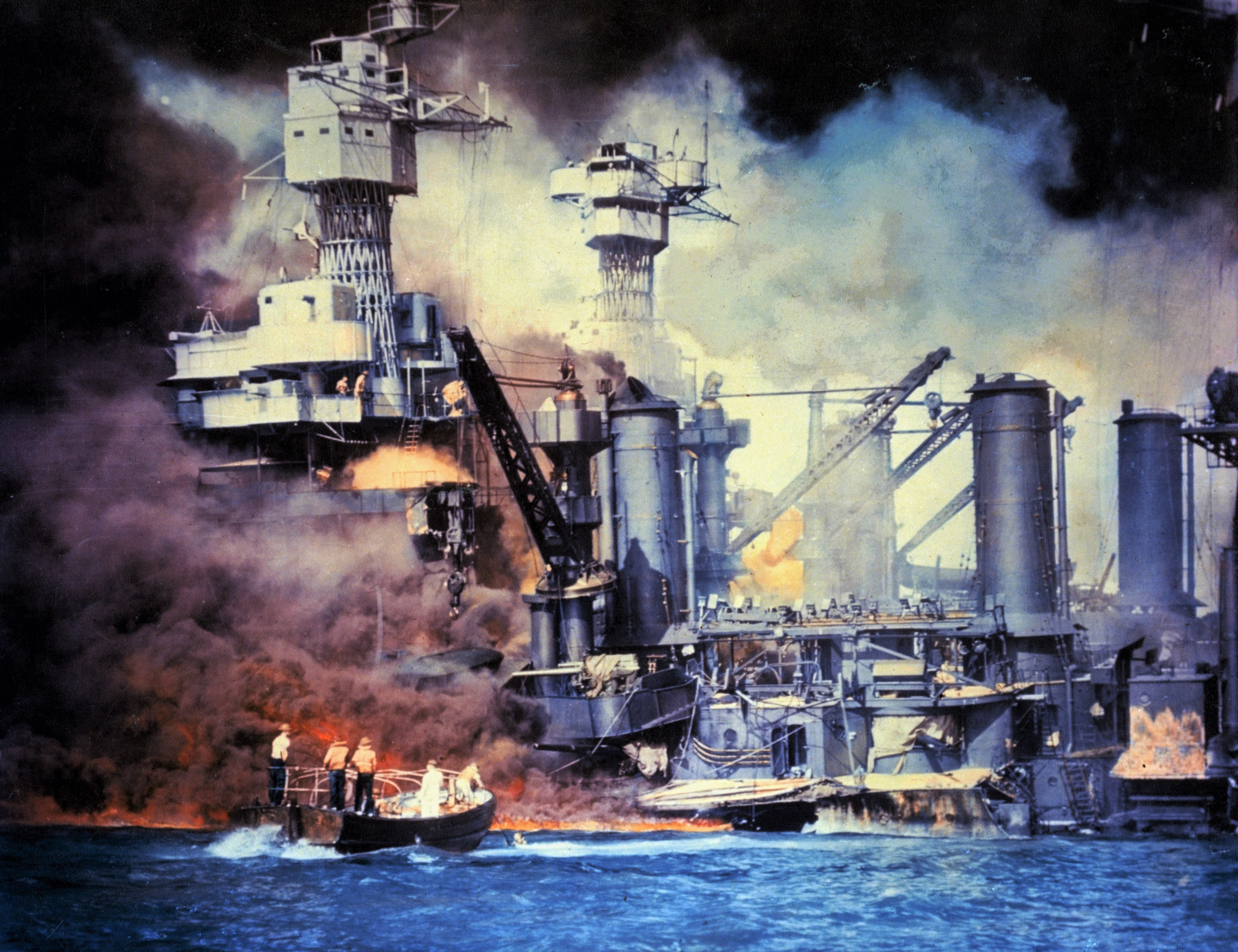
American battleships aflame after the attack on Pearl Harbor, 7 December 1941

==== Pearl Harbor ====
At the beginning of its wide-ranging offensive into southwestern Asia and the central Pacific, Japan launched a surprise attack on Pearl Harbor on 7 December 1941 using the six aircraft carriers of the Kido Butai. More than 300 aircraft launched in two separate waves, including a mix of fighters, dive-bombers, level bombers, and torpedo bombers. The level bombers used a bomb specifically designed for the Pearl Harbor raid that was produced by adapting armor-piercing shells, and the torpedoes required modifications to allow them to function in the shallow waters of Pearl Harbor. The Japanese inflicted extensive damage on the US Pacific Fleet, sinking the battleships Arizona, Nevada, California, Oklahoma, and West Virginia, and damaging the battleships Maryland, Tennessee, and Pennsylvania. Of the vessels sunk, only Arizona and Oklahoma proved to be total losses; the other three battleships were raised, repaired and modernized, and returned to service later in the war.

By the end of 1941, three of the least-damaged battleships from Pearl Harbor—Maryland, Tennessee, and Pennsylvania—had returned to service, and they were joined by the battleship Colorado, which had been refitting in Washington at the time of the attack. Three battleships from the Atlantic Fleet—Idaho, Mississippi, and New Mexico—had joined them by mid-1942, providing a force of seven battleships that was more powerful than the fleet of eight ships that had been attacked on 7 December. Despite the availability of these ships, they were held in home waters for several months, primarily owing to shortages of fleet oilers that could keep them operational away from bases, and priority was given to the fleet's carrier strike force.

==== Initial Japanese offensives ====
Though British planning in the 1920s and 1930s centered on the so-called Singapore strategy, the needs of the war in Europe had led to most of the Royal Navy's forces in East Asia being withdrawn. The Royal Air Force proposed that aircraft could make up the difference for the withdrawal of battleships, which were badly needed in European waters. Royal Navy planners in 1939 believed they could detach a single aircraft carrier and a battlecruiser to deal with Japanese cruiser raids, since they counted on the American Pacific Fleet as providing deterrence for its Japanese counterpart. But by 1941, as the still-neutral American Atlantic Fleet began to take on some of the burden in the Atlantic, and as war with Japan became increasingly likely, Britain made plans to deploy six battleships and battlecruisers to East Asia. Eventually, the decision was made to send the battleship Prince of Wales and the battlecruiser Repulse to Singapore as the core of Force Z. It was hoped that they would act as a deterrent to Japanese aggression, and if that failed, they were to carry out the original mission of countering Japanese cruisers.

The commander of Force Z, Admiral Tom Phillips, decided to use his ships offensively, and upon learning of the Japanese landing at Kota Bharu on the night of 8 December 1941, sortied to attack the invasion fleet. The Japanese fleet was covered by a pair of older fast battleships, Kongō and Haruna, along with ten cruisers and twenty-four destroyers. Confused reports led Phillips to take his ships to Kuantan on 10 December, and having failed to locate any Japanese forces, he turned back to Singapore. While at sea, a total of eighty-five Mitsubishi G3M bombers and G4M torpedo bombers caught Force Z. In the span of about an hour and fifteen minutes, the G4Ms scored several torpedo hits on Prince of Wales and Repulse, sinking them both with heavy loss of life. This was the first time aircraft had been able to sink a modern battleship that was maneuvering and returning fire.

==== Guadalcanal campaign ====
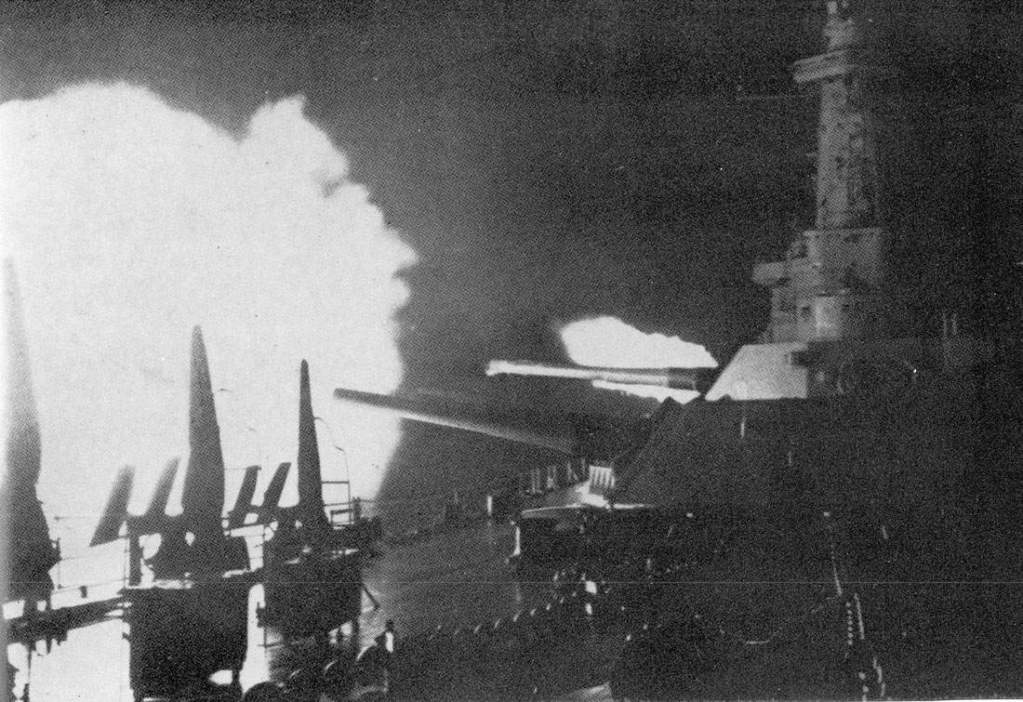
Washington engaged in night firing; note the low elevation of the gun barrels

Following the Japanese defeat at the Battle of Midway in June 1942, the senior commanders of the US Navy perceived that Japan had overextended itself and the time was right to launch a counterattack. They identified the island of Guadalcanal as the location to be seized, and the 1st Marine Division landed there on 7 August. The fast battleship North Carolina was assigned as an escort for the carriers during the initial actions in the Guadalcanal campaign, including the Battle of the Eastern Solomons on 24 August, where the ship's air-search radar proved effective at detecting an incoming Japanese air strike before any other vessel. In the battle, North Carolina provided a formidable anti-aircraft defense for the rest of the task force. On 15 September, North Carolina was torpedoed by a Japanese submarine and had to withdraw for repairs. By the Battle of the Santa Cruz Islands on 25 October, the battleship South Dakota had arrived to strengthen the fleet's anti-aircraft defenses. One Japanese dive-bomber hit South Dakota but inflicted minimal damage.

As the Battle of Guadalcanal continued to escalate through late 1942, the Japanese sent Kongō and Haruna to bombard the US base at Henderson Field on the night of 13–14 October. The battleships Hiei and Kirishima were sent on another such mission on the night of 13 November, along with several cruisers and destroyers. They encountered an American cruiser force, which resulted in the first night of the Naval Battle of Guadalcanal, in which the cruisers, firing in a confused melee at very close range, mauled Hiei. She was scuttled the following day after repeated air attacks from Henderson Field. The US battleship Washington had arrived by that time, and she joined South Dakota and four destroyers to form Task Group 16.3, under the command of Rear Admiral Willis Lee. The ships were to block another expected bombardment the night of 15 November. As predicted, Kirishima returned with several cruisers and destroyers, but Washington's radar-directed fire quickly incapacitated the former. South Dakota suffered several machinery breakdowns during the action and was moderately damaged by Japanese gunfire in return.

==== American offensives in the Central Pacific ====
By late 1943, the US Navy had begun its offensive across the central Pacific, island hopping toward Japan. The first campaign struck the Gilbert and Marshall Islands in late 1943 and early 1944. During these operations, the fast battleships of the North Carolina and South Dakota classes generally acted as escorts for the fast carrier task force. They were also occasionally detached to bombard Japanese positions ashore. Seven of the older pre-war battleships were also employed during the Gilberts and Marshalls campaign, where they saw action as shore bombardment vessels. These operations continued during the Mariana and Palau Islands campaign, which lasted from mid- to late-1944, during which several of the fast battleships contributed their considerable anti-aircraft firepower to the fleet's defense in the Battle of the Philippine Sea on 19–20 June. During that action, the Japanese battleships Yamato, Musashi, Haruna, and Kongō cruised with the fleet, but were not directly engaged, with the exception of Haruna, which was lightly damaged by the American carrier aircraft. After the Americans defeated Japanese garrisons on Saipan, Tinian, and Guam in the Marianas Islands, they turned south-west toward Palau and Pelelieu; again, five of the older battleships provided extensive fire support to the troops fighting ashore.

==== Battle of Leyte Gulf ====
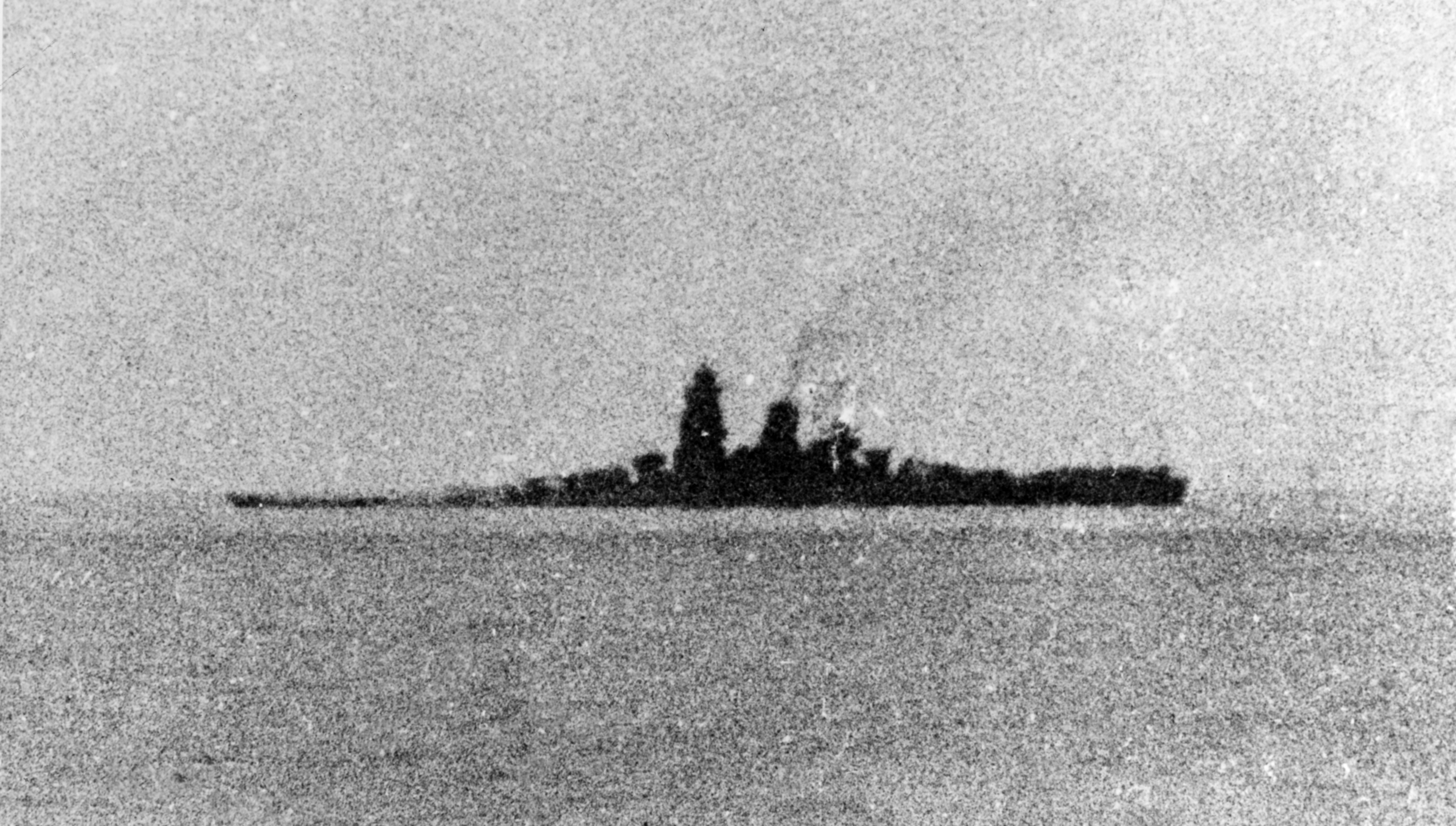
Musashi sinking during the Battle of Sibuyan Sea, 24 October 1944

By the time of the Battle of the Philippine Sea in 1944, heavy aircraft losses had left the Japanese carrier fleet ineffectual and forced the Japanese to finally commit their dreadnoughts, both old and new, to the upcoming Leyte Campaign. The objective in this battle was to stop the Allies from capturing the Philippines, which would cut off the Japanese oil supply and render their navy useless.

In the Battle of Leyte Gulf, two Japanese battleship forces converged on the American landing forces at Leyte Gulf. The Center Force of five fast battleships attacked from the north; the Southern Force of two slower old battleships attacked from the south. In the Battle of the Sibuyan Sea on 24 October 1944, the Center Force came under attack by American aircraft and Musashi, sister ship to Yamato, was sunk long before she could come within gun range of the American fleet. At the Battle of Surigao Strait early on 25 October, the Japanese Southern Force which included the battleships Fusō and Yamashiro encountered a force including six American battleships (five of them raised and repaired from Pearl Harbor), led by Admiral Jesse Oldendorf of the U.S. Seventh Fleet. Fusō was sunk by torpedoes from US destroyers before the opposing battleships fired. Yamashiro was hit by the US battleships and retired without being able to fire on them. After the battleships had ceased fire she was sunk by a torpedo fired by a US destroyer. This engagement marked the last time in history when battleship faced battleship.

In the Battle off Samar later on 25 October 1944, the remaining four powerful battleships of the Center Force, Yamato, Kongō, Haruna, and Nagato and their cruiser escort, surprised and attacked the seemingly much weaker American task force "Taffy 3", consisting of destroyers, destroyer escorts, and escort carriers. American destroyers and aircraft attacked the battleships, enabling Taffy 3 to disengage and forcing the Center Force to withdraw, This battle marked the only time Yamato engaged enemy ships with her primary or secondary batteries.

==== Iwo Jima, Okinawa, and Japan campaigns ====
During July and August 1945 several American battleships and HMS King George V conducted naval bombardments of several Japanese coastal cities. These attacks targeted major factories as well as the cities' harbors and nearby rail infrastructure.

== Capabilities and tactics ==
=== Aerial defense ===
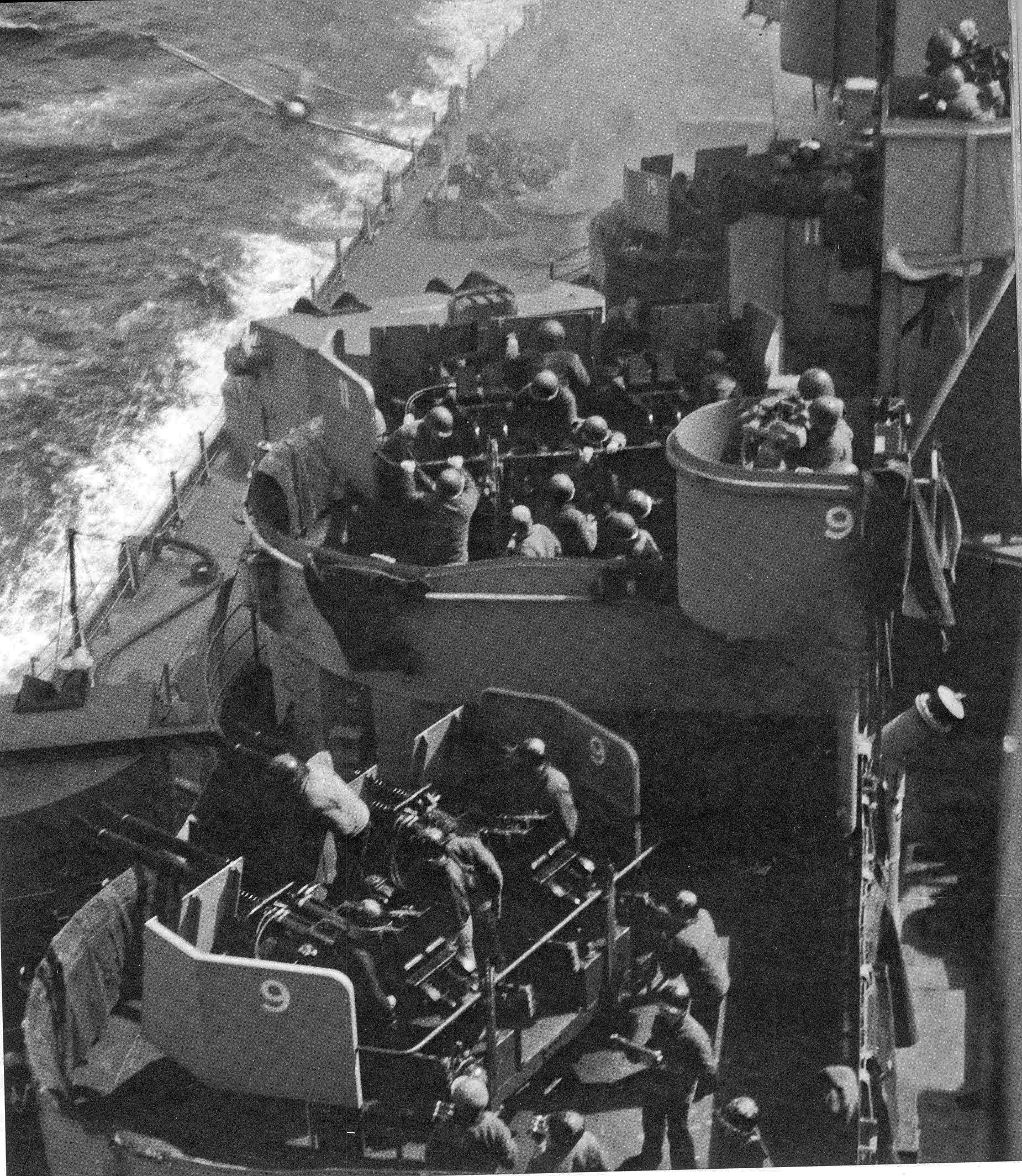
A kamikaze (just left of center near the top border), a Mitsubishi Zero in this case, about to hit the Missouri (1944)

An aircraft carrier's combat air patrol proved to be the most effective form of defense against enemy bombers. Nonetheless, a modern fast battleship could provide point defense against attackers that broke through the fighter screen. The battleships' presence was crucial during these engagements in 1942, as the U.S. were still months from being able to realize their material advantage, with too few planes and ships to interdict enough of the skilled Japanese pilots. No American battleships were lost or seriously damaged by aerial attacks in open seas in World War II.

By 1944, Admiral Raymond A. Spruance had arrayed his forces in a complex defense formation. The first line of protection was a radar-vectored combat air patrol, and any attackers who managed to get through would face anti-aircraft fire from a line of screening battleships and cruisers. This exacted such a heavy toll on the Japanese during the Battle of the Philippine Sea that they failed to cause any significant damage to their main targets, the aircraft carriers. The most damage that the Japanese caused was a bomb hit on South Dakota which caused many casualties but did little damage to the battleship.

At the outbreak of World War II, most battleships had large anti-aircraft batteries. The battleships used the same light AA guns (the Allies used autocannons such as the Bofors 40 mm gun and Oerlikon 20 mm cannon) as those on smaller ships, but in greater number. The later development of proximity fuses and radar vastly increased the effectiveness of these batteries.

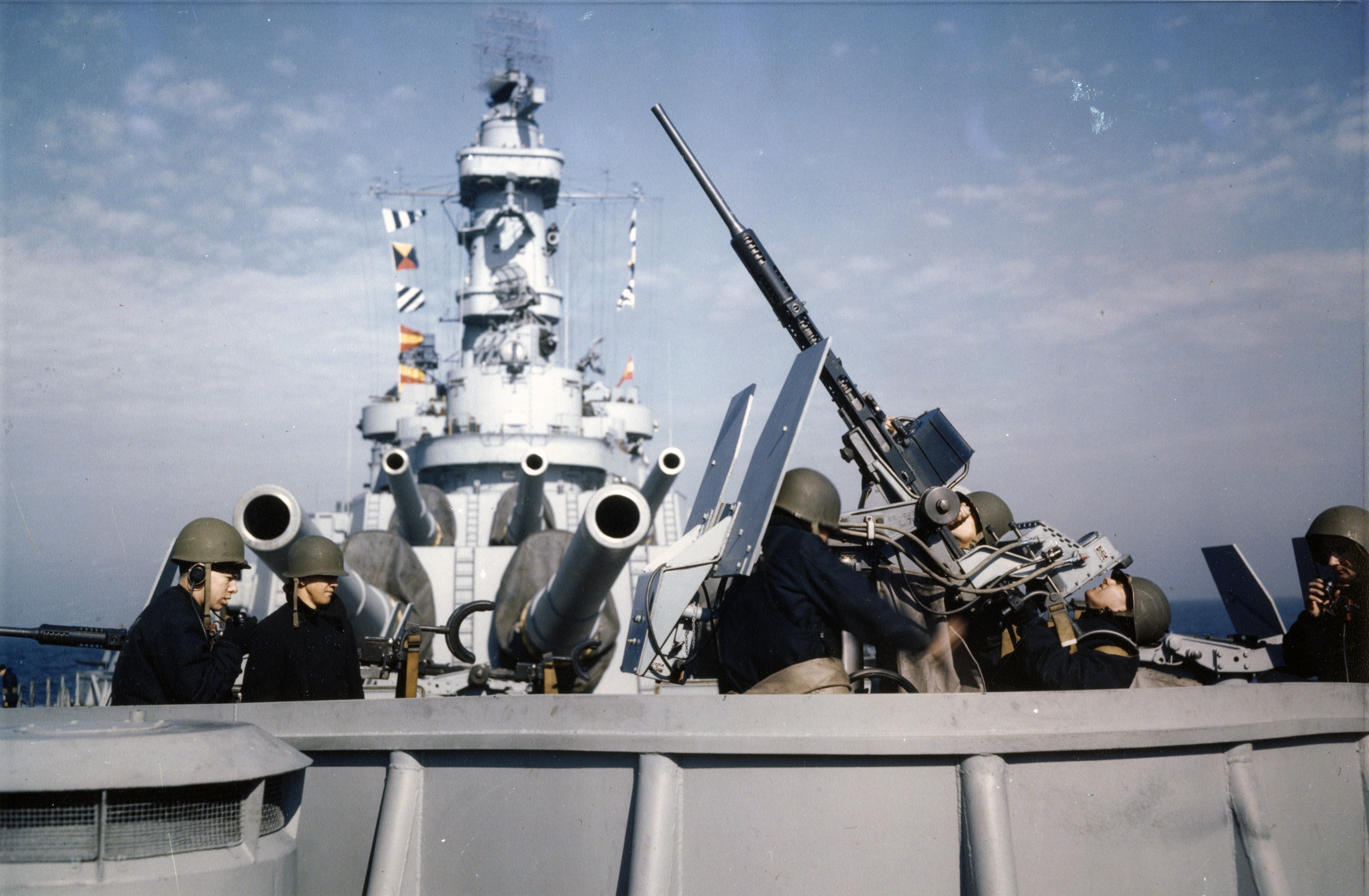
Oerlikon 20mm AA gun mount on board USS Iowa (BB-61)

Post–World War I battleships, particularly British and American, had discarded single purpose secondary batteries mounted in casemates used to engage surface targets in favor of turret-mounted dual purpose secondary batteries (5-inch or 6-inch caliber). Secondaries were initially designed to deal with rushing destroyers and torpedo boats, but there arose a need for heavy anti-aircraft armament as the potency of aircraft grew, particularly dive bombers and torpedo bombers. The rationale was that it is unlikely that a battleship would be simultaneously facing both destroyers and aircraft, but it would take up too much space to have separate types of guns to deal with both threats. Both weapons had similar calibers and so they could be merged into a single battery type, and the turret mountings were less susceptible to flooding and had a better firing arc than casemates. The space saved from combining the two types of guns added to simplification of supply, increased deck armor coverage, stowage of other equipment, more light anti-aircraft batteries, and other needs.

The Nelson-class battleship, incorporating many concepts from the G3 battlecruiser, was the first design to include a dual-purpose secondary battery, useful against both surface and airborne attacks. Compared to light AA they had a slower rate of fire, but they had a greater range and sufficient punch to knock enemy planes out of the sky. This proved a crucial defense against Japanese kamikazes in the latter years of World War II. They could also fire into the sea to create waterspouts that slapped low-flying torpedo bombers with tonnes of water. Battleships could mount many more of these DP batteries than cruisers or carriers.

German vessels such as the Bismarck class possessed dedicated secondary anti-ship batteries as well as dedicated heavy anti-aircraft batteries, rather than adopting the dual-purpose secondaries like the British or Americans. Bismarck for instance had a battery of twelve 5.9-inch (15 cm) cannon and another sixteen 4.1 inches (10 cm) battery was mounted to deal with air threats. The cannon could be used against ships only, as they could not be elevated to fire on high-level targets. This tended to complicate ammunition supplies, take up more space, and reduce the numbers of both guns (reducing the anti-ship or anti-aircraft broadside). The Imperial Japanese Navy suffered similar problems to the Germans', as their secondaries were too slow to track aircraft.

The Japanese even used the "San Shiki" (the Beehive) Model 13 anti-aircraft shell for the main gun armament of the Yamato-battleships, which would have in theory functioned as a super-sized "shotgun", though this was not considered a success.

HMS Prince of Wales had one of the most advanced naval anti-aircraft systems of the time, the High Angle Control System, which demonstrated accurate long range radar directed AA fire during Operation Halberd in August and September 1941. However the extreme heat and humidity in Malayan waters in December of that year rendered her AA FC radars unserviceable and her 2-pounder ammunition had deteriorated as well. Royal Air Force technicians were called in to examine the Prince's radars but did not have sufficient time to make the repairs, rendering her HACS ineffective.

==== Armor ====
In the aftermath of the Battle of Jutland and post–World War I era, designers began drawing up armor schemes that protected against ordnance dropped by aircraft or submarines. World War I ships fired at direct 90 degree trajectories. The introduction of high-angle battleship fire and plane bombings forced shipbuilders to consider adding significant armor to the top of battleships. The five ships of the American Tennessee and Colorado classes had considerably improved underwater hull protection over previous battleships, as the result of extensive experimentation and testing. The new class of Battleship was to include 40 inches (100 cm) of armored plating. The proposed G3 battlecruiser was planned to incorporate a thoroughly tested torpedo defense scheme, which was later used in the Nelson class. Not surprisingly, as many World War I battleships lacked such a protection system, they fared poorly against torpedoes, which in World War II were increasingly being delivered by submarines and aircraft.

Battleships had an armored belt along the waterline. It was intended to stop shells that hit their sides and to prevent flooding by underwater explosions due to near misses. World War I battleship, German and Italian World War II battleships had lighter upper armored belts to protect sides up to the main or weather deck. Main belt thickness along the waterline ranged from 10 to 15 inches (25 to 38 cm), upper belt thickness ranged from 4 to 10 inches (10 to 25 cm). Most ships of the World War II period had a sloped main belt (internal in some classes), to increase resistance to incoming shells; and no upper belt, to save weight. Thicknesses of belt armor ranged from 10 inches (25 cm) for Strasbourg class - large battlecruisers rather than pure battleships - or from 12 inches (30 cm) for the South Dakota and Iowa classes to 16 inches (41 cm) for the Yamato class.

World War I ships had a light upper armored deck to protect the secondary guns and a main armored deck whose sides sloped down to meet the lower edge of the belt, but their thickness was usually no more than 1.5 or 2.0 inches (3.8 or 5.1 cm) for the slopes. As soon as long-range engagements became common and aerial threats increased, crash programs to improve deck and turret roof protection started. US Navy "all-or-nothing" armor layout introduced a flat heavy armor deck, which abutted the upper edges of the armored belt, and light armored weather and lower decks: this design was used by all World War II ships except Reichsmarine units, that kept a heavier lower deck and a lighter upper deck. Main deck armor thickness ranged from 4 to 6 inches (10 to 15 cm) or even 9 inches (23 cm) for Yamato, usually increased over magazines: lighter decks were 1.5 to 2.0 inches (3.8 to 5.1 cm) thick.

From the lessons of Jutland, the protection scheme incorporated a sophisticated torpedo defense system (TDS). By adopting a turbo-electric drive, this allowed a wholesale rearrangement and close subdivision of the machinery spaces, while simultaneously narrowing them and permitting more space outboard for a layered system of voids, liquid-filled tanks and thin armored bulkheads. By contrast, "thin-skinned" cruisers and carriers relied only on numerous compartments to prevent flooding from spreading. Some were upgraded with anti-torpedo blisters, though these were much inferior to the battleship's armored belt. During the Pearl Harbor attack, TDS and damage control counter-flooding saved West Virginia from nine torpedo hits, while Oklahoma, which lacked it, capsized after just three.

For the attack on Pearl Harbor the Imperial Japanese Navy Air Service adapted 16-inch (41 cm) shells from the Nagato-battleships into an aerial bomb specifically designed to penetrate the deck armor of the American battleships. It was one of these weapons, dropped from a Nakajima B5N level bomber, which resulted in the destruction of the USS Arizona.

During the attack on Yamato, according to a PBS documentary, U.S. torpedo bombers were taught to aim for either the bow or the stern, where the protective belt did not extend. For torpedo bombers to make their runs successfully, fighters strafed the battleship to suppress AA guns, and dive bombers wreaked havoc on the upper decks, destroying AA weapons and fire control systems. Pilots were also instructed to focus on one side of the ship, causing massive flooding which was difficult to counteract, leading to the ship capsizing. A bow hit was deadly, since the onrushing water from the battleship's high speed could wrench the hole open wider and collapse compartment bulkheads, which was why Musashi foundered at Sibuyan Sea. The stern attacks are best demonstrated by the cases of Bismarck and Prince of Wales; the rudders and screws were similarly vulnerable.

Fleet Air Arm planned to release their armor-piercing bombs from above a certain height so they would penetrate Tirpitz's thick armor during Operation Tungsten. As the British pilots did not release their ordnance from the optimal altitude, Tirpitz suffered extensive damage to her upper works but her deck armor remained intact. While the suicide air attacks—the so-called kamikaze—struck many U.S. battleships, none were seriously damaged due to their thick armor. Kamikaze were much more successful against lesser-armored ships.

There were limits to the battleship's protection scheme, since it could not keep pace with the faster pace of developments in ordnance. For instance, the TDS in the South Dakota and Iowa-class battleships were designed to absorb the energy from an underwater explosion equivalent to 700 pounds (317 kg) of TNT — the Navy's best guess in the 1930s about Japanese weapons. But unbeknownst to U.S. Naval Intelligence, the Japanese 24-inch (61 cm) Type 93 torpedo, carried a charge equivalent to 891 pounds (405 kg) of TNT. And no amount of armor that could be practically incorporated would have saved Tirpitz from the massive 12,000 lb (5.4t) Tallboys dropped by RAF Lancaster bombers during Operation Catechism. Notably a Tallboy bomb that hit Tirpitz amidships between the aircraft catapult and the funnel blew a massive hole into the ship's side and bottom, destroying the entire section of belt armor abreast of the bomb hit, which caused significant flooding and contributed to the ship's rapid list and eventual capsizing.

==== Coordination and waves ====
In a well-planned attack, fighter planes strafed the battleship to suppress the AA guns, while dive bombers used their armor-piercing bombs to cause topside damage and havoc. The fighters and dive bombers, however, were diversions to allow the delivery of aerial torpedoes.

Battleships were able to sustain more punishment and had fewer vulnerable spots than cruisers and carriers, so it was difficult to rely upon scoring a critical hit (the cases of the Bismarck and Prince of Wales are considered exceptional). Instead, battleships were defeated by attrition, when attackers overwhelmed them with repeated attacks inflicting accumulating damage. This notably occurred in the Battle of Leyte Gulf, when the battleship Musashi eventually succumbed to damage caused by waves of U.S. carrier aircraft in the Sibuyan Sea. The U.S. planes would have accomplished less if they spread out to attack the rest of the ships in Kurita's powerful force. By contrast, the 24 October air attack on Nishimura's southern pincer did little damage, even though both of his Fusō-battleships were slow World War I-era dreadnoughts and his force had far fewer screening ships, as he only faced a single wave from U.S. carriers Franklin and Enterprise.

==== Innovative attacks ====
The Axis powers implemented some unconventional methods. The Italians used with success their tested method of having frogmen delivering explosive charges to the ships, managing to severely damage HMS Queen Elizabeth and to a lesser extent Valiant in the shallow waters of the harbor of Alexandria, putting Valiant out of action until mid-1942 and Queen Elizabeth until mid-1943. Other more or less successful Italian methods included manned torpedoes and small motor assault boats, which were filled with explosives, aimed at the target, sped up to full speed, while the pilot catapulted himself out from the dashing craft.

The Germans developed a series of stand-off weapons, e.g., the guided bomb Fritz X, which scored some early successes. On 9 September 1943, the Germans managed to sink the Italian battleship Roma and severely damage her sister ship, Italia, while they were underway to surrender. The first one hit Roma amidship between 90 mm AA gun mounts, piercing deck and side, then exploded, halving her speed; the other one hit above deck between turret #2 and the conning tower. It caused an explosion that threw the turret overboard and affected the boilers, starting a major fire that detonated the main magazines. 1,353 people died; only 596 survivors, most badly burned, were rescued. Among those killed was the Italian Commander in Chief of Naval Battle Forces, Admiral Carlo Bergamini. One week later, the Germans scored another hit on the British battleship Warspite. The bomb penetrated six decks before exploding against the bottom of the ship, blowing a large hole in her. The ship took in a total of 5,000 tonnes of water, lost steam (and thus all power, both to the ship herself and to all her systems), and had to be taken in tow. She reached Malta but was out of action for the next 12 months.

The British further developed their ability to sink battleships in harbor with minisubs and very heavy bombs dropped by strategic bombers. The last active German battleship, Tirpitz, lurked until late into the war in Norwegian fjords protected by anti-submarine weapons and shore based anti-aircraft guns. She was severely damaged in September 1943 during Operation Source, a daring covert attack by British mini-subs. After several air strikes, including Operation Tungsten, which was made with carrier aircraft, Tirpitz was finally sunk in harbor by RAF heavy bombers carrying massive Tallboy bombs. During that action, code-named Operation Catechism, two of the bombs penetrated her armor, one holing her port side and the other starting a fire that eventually detonated her magazines and blew off her Caesar turret, causing her to capsize and killing 1,000 of the 1,700 men aboard.

== See also ==
- List of ships of World War II
- List of battleships of World War II
