= Eugene E. Lindsey =

United States Navy officer

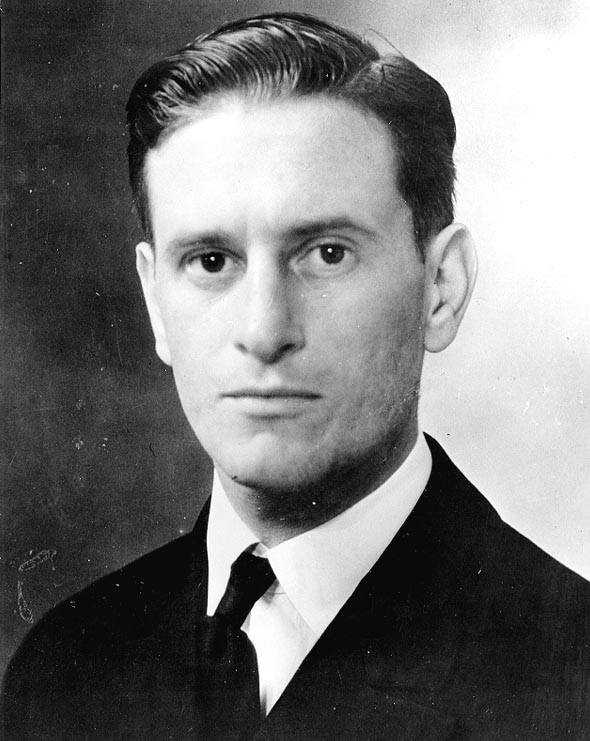
- Lindsey c. 1929
- Born: July 2, 1905; Sprague, Washington, U.S.
- Died: June 4, 1942 (aged 36) near Midway Atoll
- Military career
- Allegiance: United States
- Branch: United States Navy
- Service years: 1927–1942
- Rank: Lieutenant commander
- Commands: Torpedo Squadron Six
- Conflicts: World War II: Battle of Midway
- Awards: Navy Cross; Distinguished Flying Cross; Purple Heart

Eugene Elbert Lindsey (July 2, 1905 – June 4, 1942) was an officer and aviator in the United States Navy. He is the namesake of the destroyer USS Lindsey (DD-771).

== Naval career ==
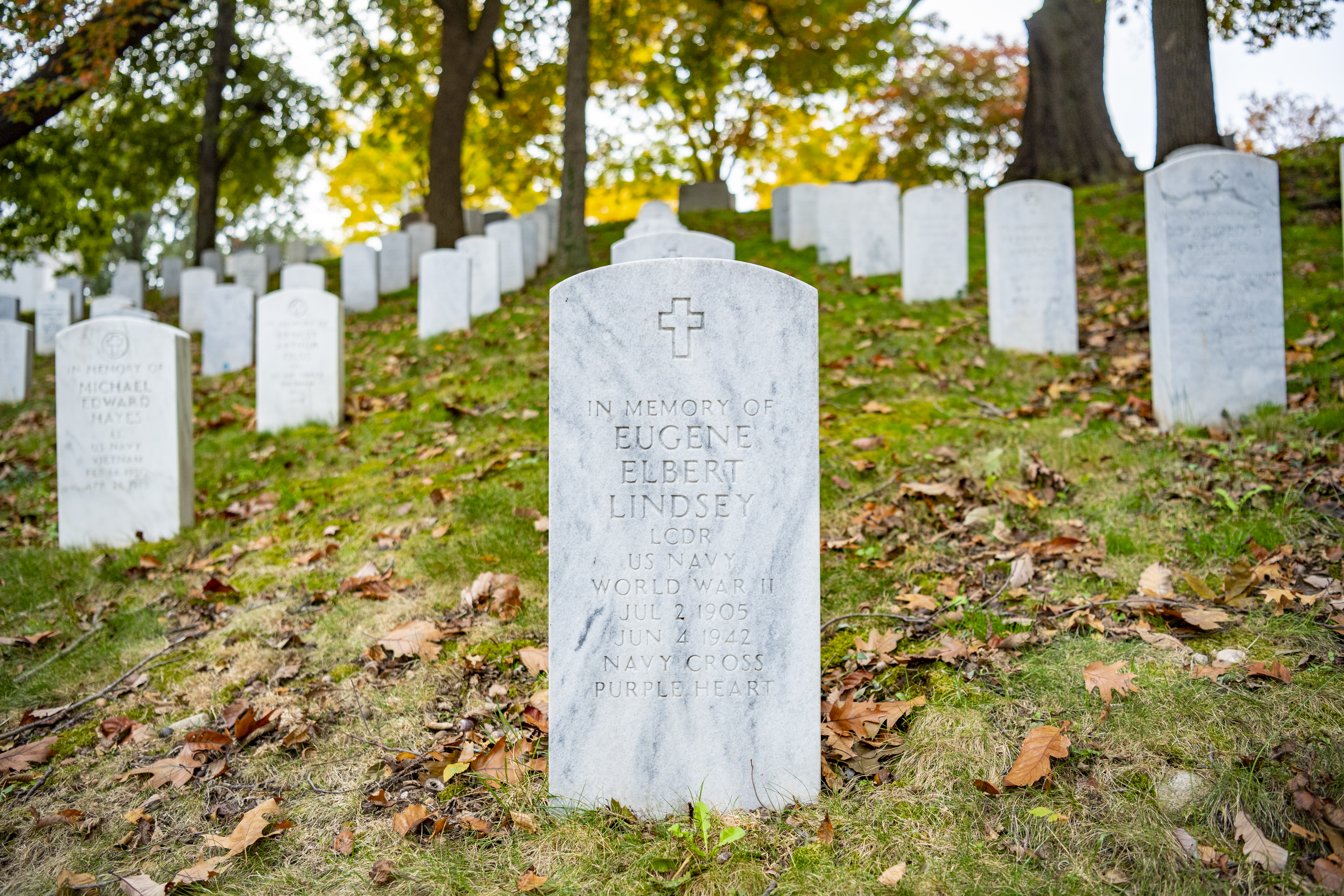
Cenotaph at Arlington National Cemetery

Lindsey was born in Sprague, Washington, on July 2, 1905 and graduated from the United States Naval Academy in 1927. William Brockman, Creed Burlingame and John Thach were some of his classmates. After duty on USS Nevada and USS Saratoga, he completed flight training in 1929 and served with a bombing squadron on USS Lexington and an observation squadron on the USS Maryland. From 3 June 1940 he commanded Torpedo Squadron Six (VT-6), which flew Douglas TBD-1 "Devastator" torpedo bombers, in USS Enterprise.

On 7 December 1941, Lindsey was aboard Enterprise when he received word (along with most of the ship's company) of the Japanese attack on Pearl Harbor. That evening (at 16:30), Enterprise received a report of an enemy carrier south of Oahu. With most of the ship's dive bombers having either flown into Pearl that morning or been deployed on search, Lindsey was ordered to lead his 19 TBDs against the target. However, the contact report proved to be false, and the strike found nothing. On their return around 20:00, Enterprise ordered the strike to proceed to Ford Island. However, Lindsey, who knew his men were low on fuel, refused, and convinced his ship to take them in. The VT-6 pilots, landing with live torpedoes and (in some cases) no night landing experience, all got aboard safely.

Lindsey's first real combat occurred on 1 February 1942, when he led VT-6's first division in two strikes against Japanese targets in the Marshall Islands. In the first, he led nine bomb-carrying TBDs as part of a full-scale dawn strike against Roi and Kwajalein. For the second, he took off as part of a follow-up strike of 8 SBDs and nine TBDs (again carrying bombs) to hit shipping and facilities at Wotje. In both cases, Lindsey's division returned without loss. His performance and leadership on these strikes would earn him the Distinguished Flying Cross.

On 24 February 1942, Lindsey again led nine bomb-equipped TBDs as part of Enterprise's strike against Wake Island. Again, VT-6 returned without loss (although two SBDs went down). On 4 March, Enterprise continued the campaign by hitting Marcus Island. However, Lindsey's men missed out as they were being held in reserve in case any important shipping targets turned up.

On 28 May 1942, as Enterprise departed Pearl Harbor in preparation for the Battle of Midway, Lindsey made a bad landing while leading his squadron aboard. As his plane neared touchdown, it suddenly stalled, struck the deck hard, and careened over the port side. The destroyer USS Monaghan rescued Lindsey and his crew (ACRM Charles T. Grenat and Machinist Thomas E. Schaffer). According to the Enterprise log, Lindsey suffered "several cracked ribs, [a] punctured lung, multiple cuts, and other lacerations." With such severe injuries, his shipmates expected him to be sidelined for the coming battle.

Lindsey, however, refused to let his injuries prevent him from leading his squadron. On 4 June, the day of the battle, he surprised Air Group Commander Wade McClusky by joining him at breakfast. After almost a week of recuperation, Lindsey was still so bruised about the face that he could not put on his flight goggles. However, when McClusky asked if he could fly, Lindsey answered, “This is what I’ve been trained to do”.

Lindsey died in action on 4 June 1942 with his rear-seat gunner, Charles T. Grenat, ACRM, in the Battle of Midway, when their Douglas TBD Devastator was shot down by Japanese A6M2 Zero fighters, while attacking the aircraft carrier Kaga. VT-6 lost 10 out of 14 planes. He was posthumously awarded the Navy Cross for his contribution to the battle.

== Awards and honors ==
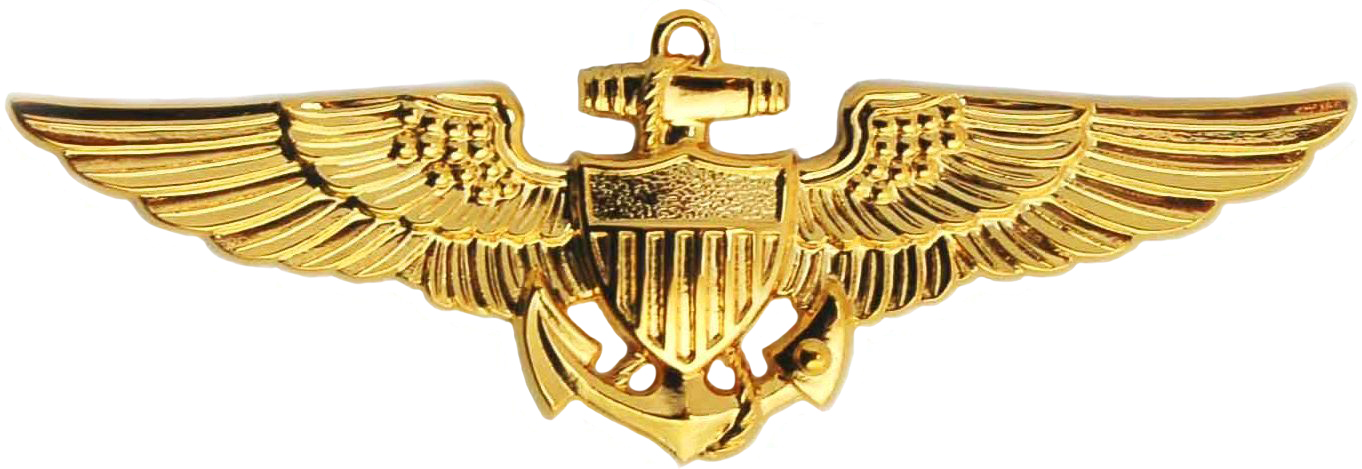

Naval Aviator Badge
Navy Cross		Distinguished Flying Cross
Purple Heart	Navy Presidential Unit Citation	American Defense Service Medal w/ Fleet clasp
American Campaign Medal	Asiatic-Pacific Campaign Medal w/ three 3/16" bronze stars	World War II Victory Medal

=== Navy Cross citation ===

Lieutenant Commander Eugene Elbert Lindsey
U.S. Navy
Date Of Action: June 4, 1942

The President of the United States of America takes pride in presenting the Navy Cross (Posthumously) to Lieutenant Commander Eugene Elbert Lindsey, United States Navy, for extraordinary heroism in operations against the enemy while serving as Pilot of a carrier-based Navy Torpedo Plane and Squadron Commander of Torpedo Squadron SIX (VT-6), attached to the USS Enterprise (CV-6), during the "Air Battle of Midway," against enemy Japanese forces on 4 June 1942. Participating in a vigorous and intensive assault against the Japanese invasion fleet, Lieutenant Commander Lindsey pressed home his attack with relentless determination in the face of a terrific barrage of anti-aircraft fire. The unprecedented conditions under which his squadron launched its offensive were so exceptional that it is highly improbably the occasion may ever recur where other pilots of the service will be called upon to demonstrate an equal degree of gallantry and fortitude. His extreme disregard of personal safety contributed materially to the success of our forces and his loyal conduct was in keeping with the highest traditions of the United States Naval Service. He gallantly gave his life for his country.

=== Namesake ===
In 1944, the destroyer USS Lindsey (DD-771) was named in his honor.

== Portrayals in film ==
He was portrayed by Robert S. Woods in the TV miniseries War and Remembrance, Parts II & III (1988).

Eugene E. Lindsey was portrayed by Darren Criss in the film Midway (2019).

== Bibliography ==
- Cressman, Robert J., and Wenger, J. Michael, Steady Nerves and Stout Hearts: The Enterprise (CV-6) Air Group and Pearl Harbor, 7 December 1941. Pictorial Histories Publishing Co., Missoula 1990. ISBN 0929521250
- Lord, Walter (1967). Incredible Victory. New York: Harper and Row. ISBN 1-58080-059-9.
- Lundstrom, John B. (1984). The First Team: Pacific Naval Air Combat from Pearl Harbor to Midway. Annapolis, Maryland: Naval Institute Press. ISBN 1-59114-471-X.
- Prange, Gordon W.; Goldstein, Donald M.; Dillon, Katherine V. (1982). Miracle at Midway. New York: McGraw-Hill. ISBN 0-07-050672-8.
