= John Thach =

United States Navy admiral (1905–1981)

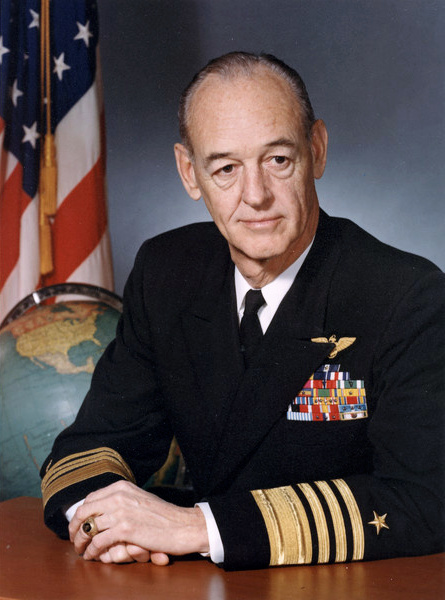
- Official Navy portrait of Admiral John S. Thach
- Born: April 19, 1905; Pine Bluff, Arkansas, U.S.
- Died: April 15, 1981 (aged 75); Coronado, California, U.S.
- Burial place: Fort Rosecrans National Cemetery
- Military career
- Allegiance: United States of America
- Branch: United States Navy
- Service years: 1927–1967
- Rank: Admiral
- Nickname: "Jimmy"
- Commands: United States Naval Forces Europe; Valley Forge (CVS-45); Franklin D. Roosevelt (CVA-42); Sicily (CVE-118); VF-3
- Conflicts: World War II; Korean War
- Awards: Navy Cross (2); Navy Distinguished Service Medal (2); Silver Star; Legion of Merit (2); Bronze Star Medal

John Smith Thach (April 19, 1905 – April 15, 1981) was a World War II Naval Aviator, air combat tactician, and United States Navy admiral. Thach developed the Thach Weave, a combat flight formation which could counter enemy fighters of superior performance, and later the big blue blanket, an aerial defense against kamikaze attacks.

== Early career ==
John S. Thach was born in Pine Bluff, Arkansas, on April 19, 1905. He graduated from the United States Naval Academy in 1927 and spent two years serving in battleships, before becoming a Naval Aviator in early 1930. His USNA classmates included William Brockman, Creed Burlingame, and Eugene Lindsey. Thach spent the next decade serving as a test pilot and instructor and establishing a reputation as an expert in aerial gunnery.

== World War II ==
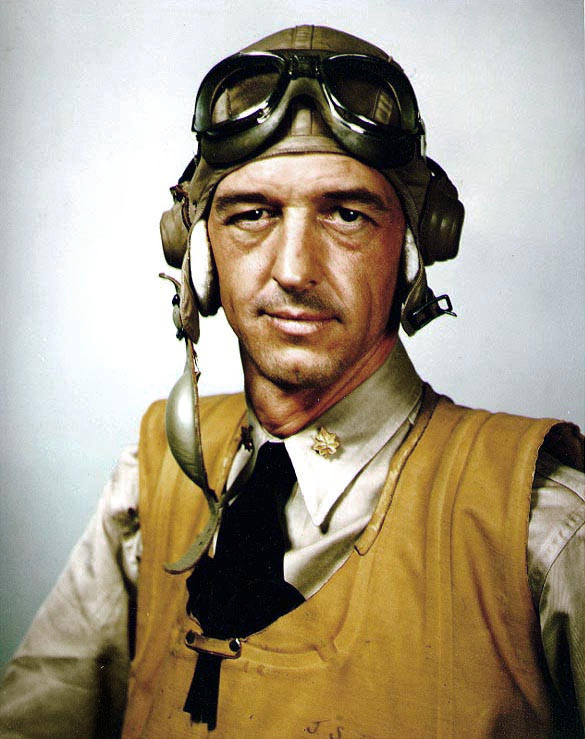
LCDR John S. Thach wearing M-450 helmet, AN6530 goggles and inflatable life vest, 1942

LCDR Thach with 7 kill markings (one out of frame) on his F4F (still from The Battle of Midway by John Ford)

In early 1940, Thach was placed in command of Fighting Squadron Three (VF-3). There he met a young ensign just out of flight school, Edward O'Hare, later a Medal of Honor recipient. Thach made O'Hare his wingman and taught him everything he knew. At the United States Navy fleet gunnery competition at the end of 1940, eight of the 16 VF-3 pilots qualified for the gunnery "E" award ("excellence").

Later Thach developed a fighter combat tactic known as the Thach Weave. This tactic enabled American fighter aircraft to hold their own against the more maneuverable Mitsubishi A6M Zero, the primary Imperial Japanese Navy fighter aircraft.

Lieutenant Commander Thach and VF-3 flew from USS Saratoga in the early part of World War II, and was assigned to USS Yorktown during the Battle of Midway in June 1942. On the morning of June 4, Thach led a six-plane sortie from VF-3, escorting twelve Douglas TBD Devastators of VT-3 led by Lieutenant Commander Lance Massey from Yorktown, when they discovered the main Japanese carrier fleet. They were immediately attacked by 15 to 20 Japanese fighters. Thach decided to use his namesake maneuver, marking its first combat usage. Although outnumbered and outmaneuvered, Thach managed to shoot down three Zeros and a wingman accounted for another, at the cost of one Grumman F4F Wildcat.

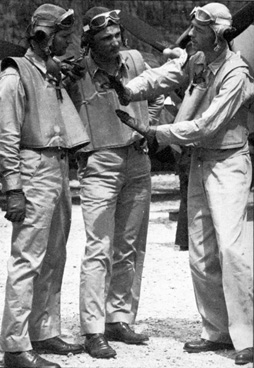
Thach (right) teaches new pilots.

After Midway, Thach was assigned to instruct other pilots in combat tactics. The United States Navy pulled its best combat pilots out of action to train newer pilots, while the Japanese kept their best pilots in combat. As the war progressed, the Japanese Navy lost their experienced pilots due to attrition and had no well-trained replacements, while the United States was able to improve the general fighting ability of their own personnel. When the Japanese resorted to the feared Kamikaze suicide attacks, Thach developed the "big blue blanket" system to provide an adequate defense.

Later in the war, Commander Thach became operations officer to Vice Admiral John S. McCain Sr., commander of the Fast Carrier Task Force. Thach was also present at the formal Japanese surrender aboard the battleship USS Missouri on September 2, 1945, in Tokyo Bay.

Thach was a flying ace, having been credited with shooting down six enemy aircraft during World War II.

== Post–World War II ==
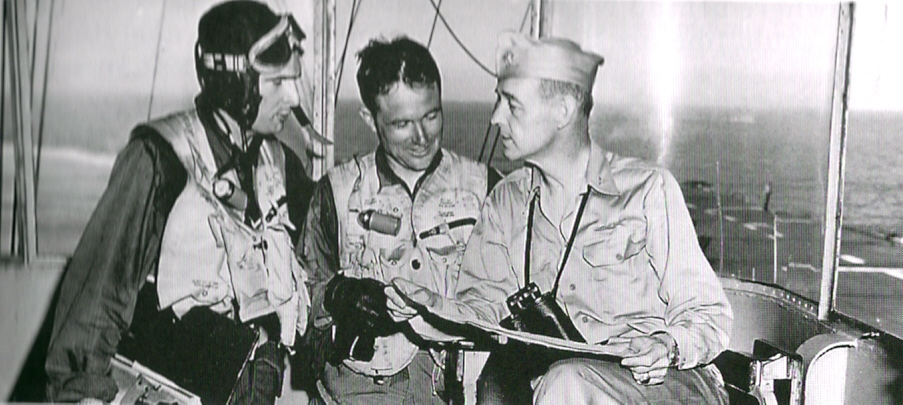
Captain John S. Thach (right) as commanding officer of the escort aircraft carrier USS Sicily (CVE-118) during the Korean War, discussing a mission with two United States Marine Corps pilots, Major Robert P. Keller (center) and First lieutenant Roland B. Heilman (left), from his ship while aboard Sicily off the Korean Peninsula

Thach commanded USS Sicily during the Korean War and USS Franklin D. Roosevelt in 1953–54. He was promoted to rear admiral in 1955.

In 1958 and 1959, Thach was placed in command of an antisubmarine development unit, "Task Group Alpha", with the aircraft carrier Valley Forge (CVS-45) serving as his flagship. He subsequently appeared on the cover of Time magazine on September 1, 1958, for his contributions to anti-submarine warfare (ASW), which was a primary focus at the time in the ongoing Cold War. An annual award was later established in his name for presentation to the top ASW squadron in the navy.

Thach was promoted to vice admiral in 1960 and served as the Deputy Chief of Naval Operations for Air in the Pentagon, where he presided over development of the A-7 Corsair II, among other naval aviation programs. As Commander in Chief, United States Naval Forces Europe, starting in 1965, he pinned on his fourth star as a full admiral, retiring from the Navy in May 1967 from that position.

The Arkansas Aviation Historical Society inducted Thach into the Arkansas Aviation Hall of Fame in 1981.

Thach died on April 15, 1981, in Coronado, California, four days before his 76th birthday, and was buried at Fort Rosecrans National Cemetery in San Diego.

The frigate Thach (FFG-43) was named in his honor.

== Personal life ==
Thach and his wife Madalynn had four children.

== Decorations ==

| Badge | Naval Aviator insignia | | |
| 1st Row | Navy Cross w/one gold award star | Navy Distinguished Service Medal w/gold star | Silver Star |
| 2nd Row | Legion of Merit w/gold star and "V" device | Bronze Star Medal w/"V" device | Navy Commendation Medal w/"V" device |
| 3rd Row | Navy Presidential Unit Citation w/two stars | Navy Unit Commendation | American Defense Service Medal w/Atlantic device |
| 4th Row | American Campaign Medal | Asiatic Pacific Campaign Medal w/ one silver and four bronze service stars | World War II Victory Medal |
| 5th Row | Navy Occupation Service Medal | National Defense Service Medal w/ service star | Korean Service Medal w/ three service stars |
| 6th Row | Philippine Liberation Medal w/ three service stars | United Nations Korea Medal | Republic of Korea Presidential Unit Citation with service star |

== Gallery ==
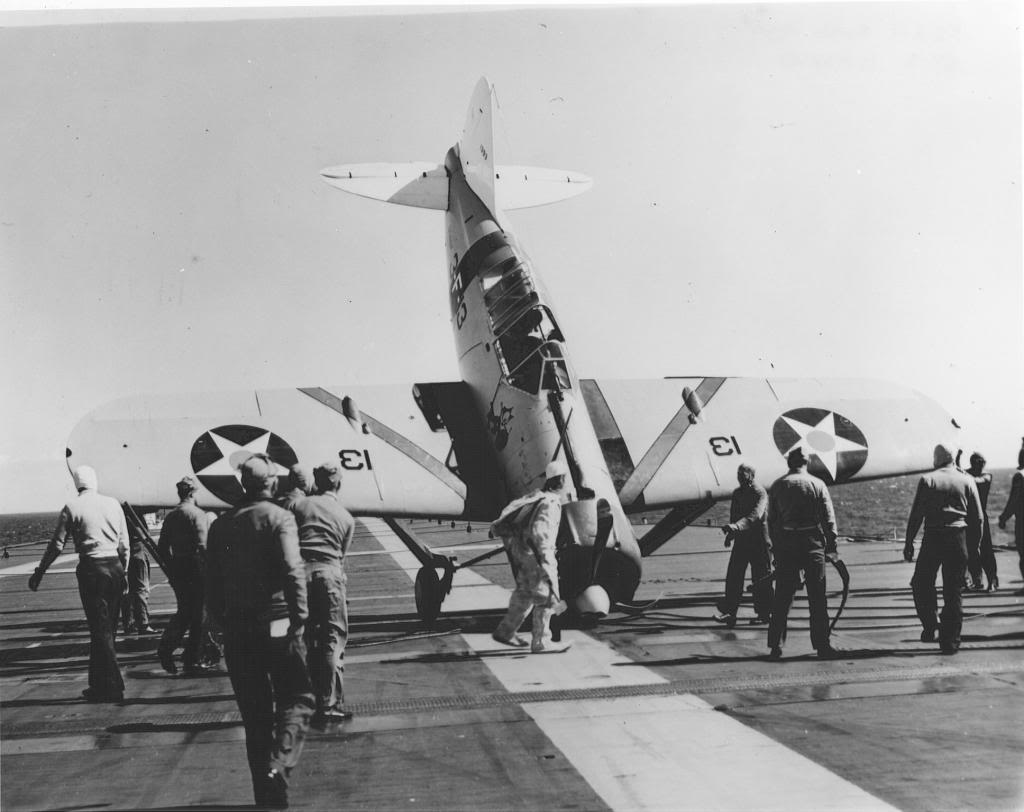
LT John S. Thach tipped this F2A-1 onto its nose on Saratoga (CV-3) in March 1940.

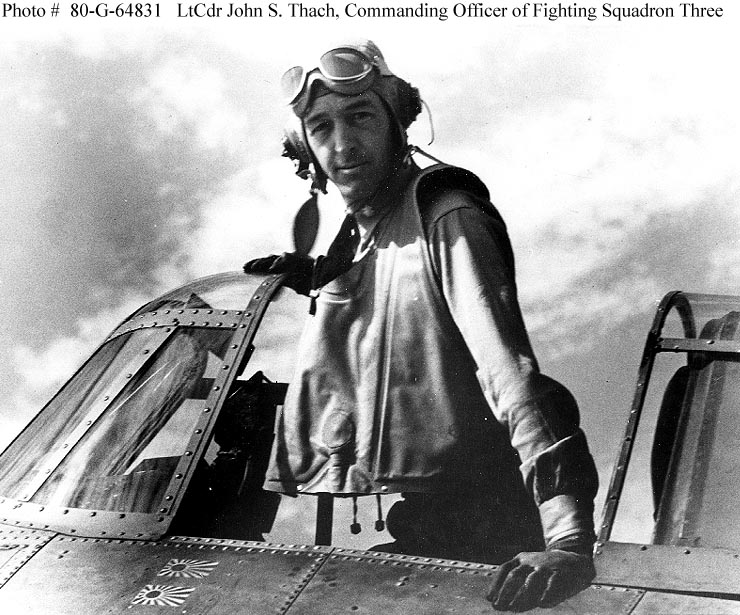
LCDR John S. Thach, CO of VF-3

== Bibliography ==
- Ewing, Steve (2004). Thach Weave: The Life of Jimmie Thach. Annapolis, Maryland: Naval Institute Press. ISBN 1-59114-248-2.
- Parshall, Jonathan; Tully, Anthony (2005). Shattered Sword: The Untold Story of the Battle of Midway. Dulles, VA: Potomac Books. ISBN 1-57488-923-0.
