= USS Lindsey =

Robert H. Smith-class destroyer minelayer

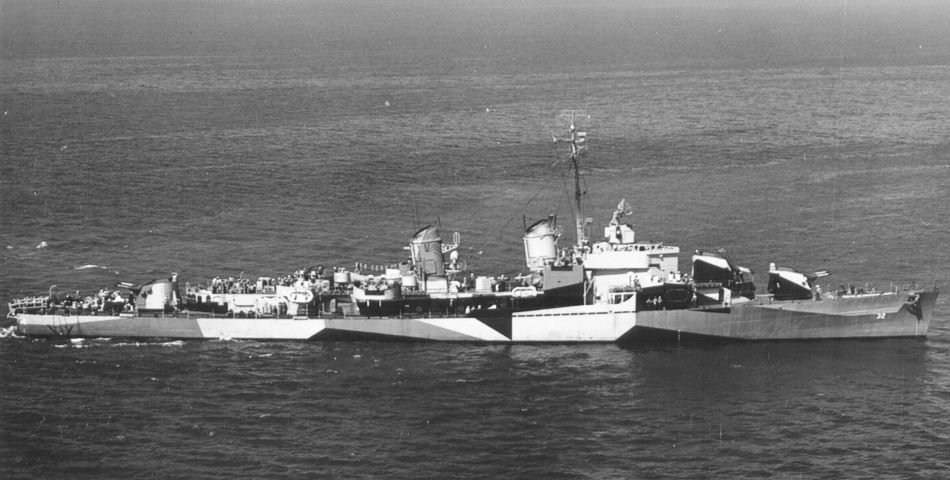

History

United States
- Name: Lindsey
- Namesake: Eugene E. Lindsey
- Builder: Bethlehem Shipbuilding, San Pedro, California
- Laid down: 12 September 1943
- Launched: 5 March 1944
- Commissioned: 20 August 1944
- Decommissioned: 25 May 1946
- Stricken: 1 October 1970
- Fate: Sunk as a target 9 May 1972

General characteristics
- Class & type: Robert H. Smith-class destroyer
- Displacement: 2,380 tons
- Length: 376 ft 6 in (114.76 m)
- Beam: 40 ft 10 in (12.45 m)
- Draft: 18 ft 10 in (5.74 m)
- Speed: 34 knots (63 km/h; 39 mph)
- Complement: 363 officers and enlisted
- Armament: 6 x 5 in (127 mm)/38 cal. guns; 12 x 40 mm guns

USS Lindsey (DD-771/DM-32/MMD-32) was a Robert H. Smith-class destroyer minelayer in the United States Navy during World War II. She was named for Eugene E. Lindsey.

Lindsey was laid down as DD-771 as an Allen M. Sumner-class destroyer on 12 September 1943 by Bethlehem Shipbuilding, San Pedro, California and launched on 5 March 1944; sponsored by Mrs. Eugene E. Lindsey, widow of Lt. Comdr. Lindsey. The ship was reclassified DM-32 on 19 July 1944 and commissioned on 20 August 1944.

== Service history ==
After shakedown off southern California, the new destroyer minelayer sailed from San Francisco on 25 November 1944 via Pearl Harbor for Ulithi, arriving on 3 February 1945. Underway from Ulithi on the morning of 8 February, Lindsey steamed toward Iwo Jima. Operating off Iwo Jima from 17 to 19 February, Lindsey knocked out six guns ashore and provided covering fire as minesweepers cleared the harbor. On 23 February, she returned to Ulithi to prepare for landings on Okinawa.

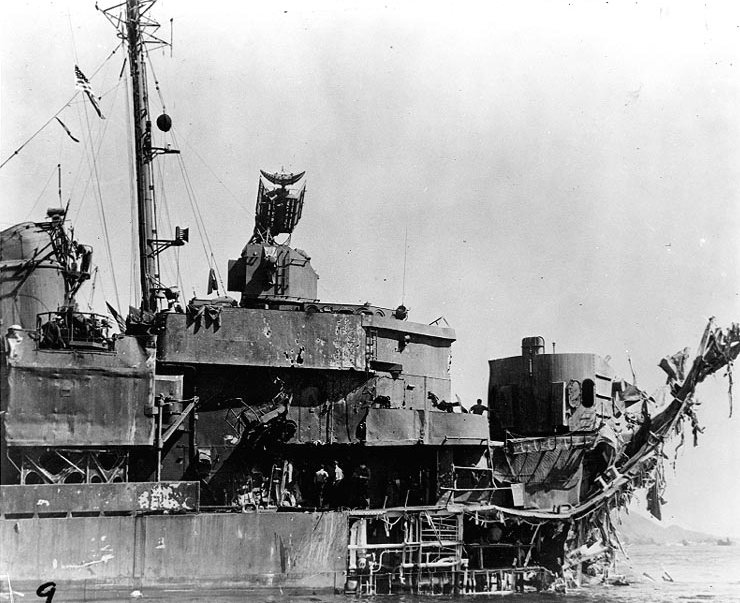
View of extensive damage to the ship's forward hull and superstructure, received when she was struck by two kamikaze planes off Okinawa on 12 April 1945.

Underway 19 March, Lindsey arrived off Okinawa on 24 March and swept the harbor for the inbound transports. Then, as the Marines gained a foothold, the ship bombarded Japanese gun installations and transferred wounded soldiers to hospital ships. On the afternoon of 12 April, Lindsey experienced a mass kamikaze attack. Her gunners scored repeated hits on seven onrushing dive bombers, but two Aichi D3A "Val" bombers, damaged and out of control, crashed into Lindsey killing 57 sailors and wounding 57 more. The explosion from the second "Val" ripped some 60 feet (18 m) off her bow. Only the “all back full” ordered by Commander Chambers prevented the pressure of inrushing water from collapsing the fireroom bulkhead and sinking the ship.

Towed to Kerama Retto the same night, Lindsey remained in the lagoon for two weeks repairing battle damage. On 28 April she departed under tow for Guam, where, after arrival 6 May, she received a temporary bow. She sailed under her own power 8 July for the east coast via Pearl Harbor and the Panama Canal, arriving in Norfolk, Virginia on 19 August 1945.

After extensive repairs at the Norfolk Naval Shipyard, Lindsey steamed 6 March 1946 for Charleston, South Carolina, and arrived the next day. Lindsey decommissioned 25 May 1946 and entered the Atlantic Reserve Fleet. She was struck from the Naval Vessel Register on 1 October 1970.

Lindsey was sunk as a target on 9 May 1972.

Lindsey received two battle stars for World War II.
