= Big blue blanket =

Air defense system

A diagram of the big blue blanket. American picket warships (destroyers) would use radar to detect incoming Japanese aircraft. They would then radio the position and course of the incoming aircraft to American fighters of the combat air patrol circling the main American fleet. Those fighters would then intercept the incoming Japanese aircraft long before they could attack the main American ships (carriers).

The big blue blanket was an air defense system devised by John Thach during World War II to protect American warships from Japanese kamikazes.

As the American island hopping campaign got closer to Japan, the Japanese military began to employ suicide operations more extensively. In 1944,

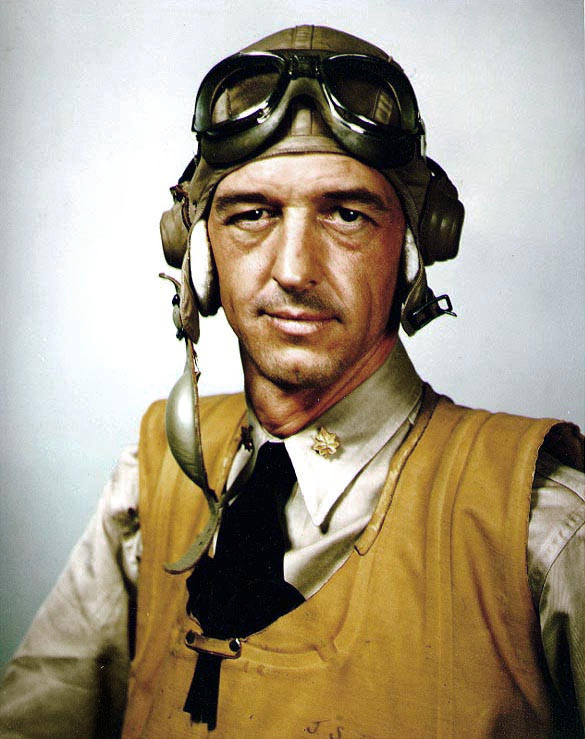
The Big blue blanket system was devised by John Thach, who had earlier developed his namesake Thach Weave.

Thatch [sic], serving on Admiral Halsey's and Admiral McCain's staff as air operations officer, developed a plan that called for the constant presence of the blue-painted Hellcats and Corsairs over the fleet at all hours. He recommended larger combat air patrols (CAP) stationed farther away from the carriers, a line of picket destroyers and destroyer escorts placed 50 or more miles from the main body of the fleet to provide earlier radar intercepts, and improved coordination between the fighter director officers on board the carriers. Thach also called for dawn-to-dusk fighter sweeps over Japanese airfields, and the use of delayed action fuses on bombs dropped on runways to make repairs more difficult,

The system left the picket ships vulnerable to kamikaze attacks, but it gave more protection to aircraft carriers and troopships.

The system had an immediate effect. During its use in the Liberation of the Philippines, "Despite an unopposed dry landing, 'suicide boats' and two hundred kamikazes made Mindoro's D-plus days as costly as Anzio's. Only saturation flights (called the "Big Blue Blanket") over Luzon airfields by Halsey's Task Force Thirty-Eight secured Mindoro."

== See also ==
- List of established military terms
