= USS S-30 =

Submarine of the United States

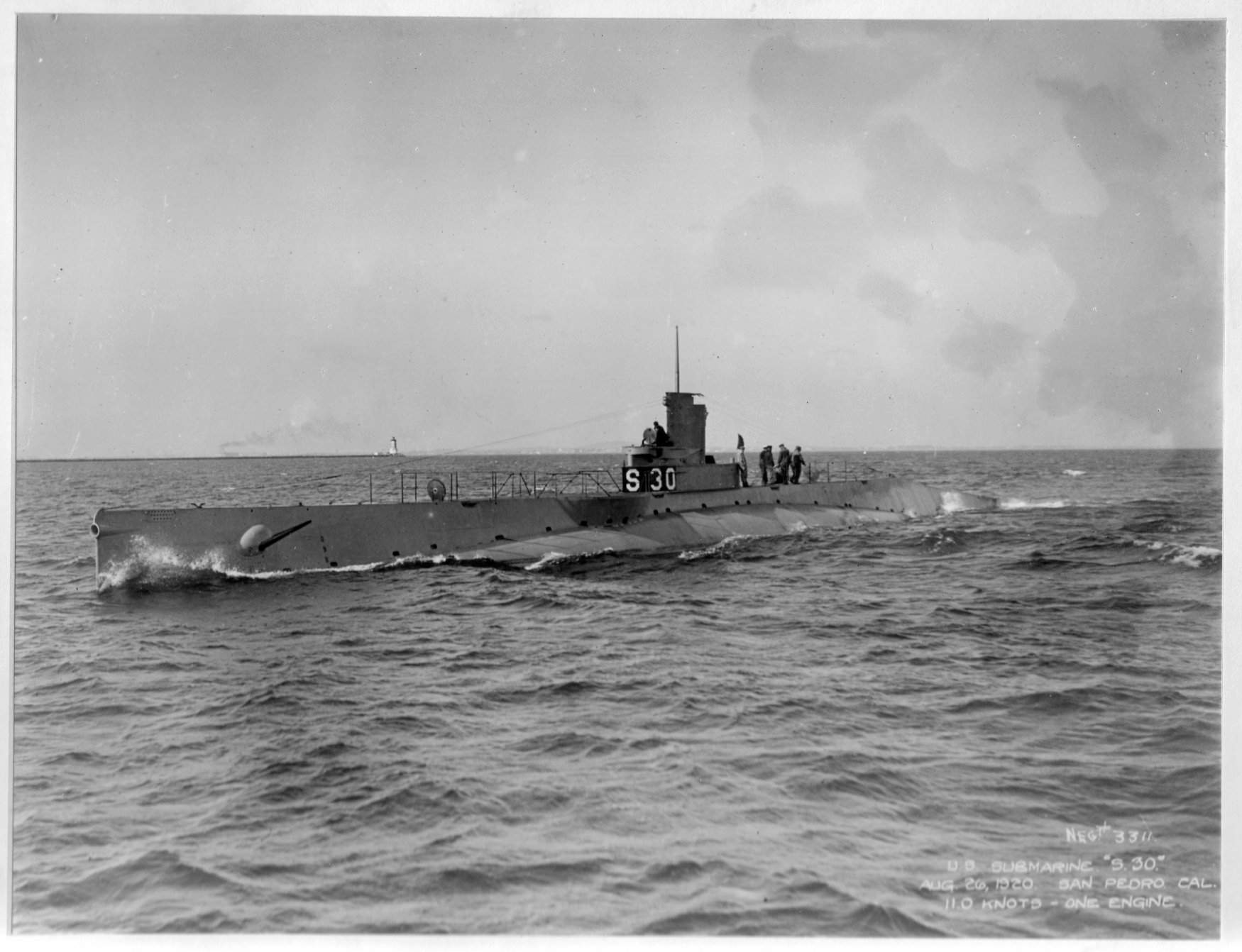
- USS S-30 making 11 knots on one engine during sea trials off San Pedro, California, on 26 August 1920.

History

United States
- Name: USS S-30
- Builder: Union Iron Works, San Francisco, California
- Laid down: 1 April 1918
- Launched: 21 November 1918
- Sponsored by: Mrs. Edward S. Stalnaker
- Commissioned: 29 October 1920
- Decommissioned: 9 October 1945
- Stricken: 24 October 1945
- Fate: Sold for scrap December 1946

General characteristics
- Class & type: S-class submarine
- Displacement: 854 long tons (868 t) surfaced; 1,062 long tons (1,079 t) submerged
- Length: 219 ft 3 in (66.83 m)
- Beam: 20 ft 8 in (6.30 m)
- Draft: 15 ft 11 in (4.85 m)
- Speed: 14.5 knots (16.7 mph; 26.9 km/h) surfaced; 11 knots (13 mph; 20 km/h) submerged
- Complement: 38 officers and men
- Armament: 1 × 4 in (102 mm)/50 deck gun; 4 × 21 inch (533 mm) torpedo tubes

Service record
- Operations: World War II
- Victories: 2 battle stars

USS S-30 (SS-135) was an S-class submarine of the United States Navy during World War II.

== Construction and commissioning ==
S-30 was laid down on 1 April 1918 by the Union Iron Works at San Francisco, California. She was launched on 21 November 1918, sponsored by Mrs. Edward S. Stalnaker, and commissioned on 29 October 1920.

== Service history ==
=== 1920–1941 ===
Based at San Pedro, California, with her home yard at Mare Island, California, S-30 conducted tests and exercises off the California coast until the summer of 1921. Then, on 15 August 1921, she was placed in ordinary. Returned to full commission on 14 February 1922, she was ordered to New London, Connecticut, where she was placed in ordinary again on 21 June 1922 for engine alterations by the prime contractor for her construction, the Electric Boat Company.

Trials and exercises off the southern New England coast followed her return to full commission on 21 November 1922. In January 1923, she moved south to the Caribbean Sea to participate in winter maneuvers and Fleet Problem I, conducted to test the defenses of the Panama Canal Zone. In April 1923, she returned to California and resumed operations off the coast of California with her division, Submarine Division 16. During the winter of 1924, she again participated in fleet exercises and Fleet Problems in the Panama Canal Zone area and in the Caribbean.

During the winter of 1925, S-30 prepared for transfer to the United States Asiatic Fleet. She departed Mare Island with her division in mid-April 1925. During May 1925, she conducted exercises and underwent upkeep in the Hawaiian Islands, and, on 16 June 1925 she got underway for the Philippines. On 12 July 1925, she arrived at the Submarine Base, Cavite, Luzon. In the years that followed, her division rotated between exercises and patrols in the Philippines during the winter and operations off the China coast during the summer.

In 1932, S-30′s division was ordered back to the eastern Pacific Ocean, and, on 2 May 1932, she departed Manila bound for Pearl Harbor, Hawaii, which became her new home port.

Transferred back to the United States East Coast, S-30 departed Pearl Harbor on 19 May 1937 and arrived at New London on 8 August 1937. She then trained along the U.S. East Coast until May 1939, when she was placed in commission, in reserve. On 1 September 1940, she returned to full commission. With World War II raging in Europe and German U-boats raiding shipping in the western Atlantic Ocean and the Caribbean, S-boats like S-30 were assigned to Submarines, Patrol Force (known as Submarines, Atlantic Fleet after February 1941) and conducted training and the development of tactical skills. From New London, she operated along the mid-Atlantic and northeastern coasts of the United States into the spring of 1941. She then served briefly in the Bermuda area before returning to New London.

In early July 1941, S-30 proceeded to Philadelphia, Pennsylvania, for overhaul. In September 1941, she emerged from the shipyard, returned to New England, and resumed submarine and antisubmarine warfare training operations in the Long Island Sound, Narragansett Bay, Casco Bay, and Placentia Bay areas.

=== World War II ===
==== First, second, and third (defensive) war patrols ====
The United States entered World War II on 7 December 1941 with the Japanese attack on Pearl Harbor, and S-30′s division, Submarine Division 52, soon was reassigned to the Panama Canal Zone for defensive patrol duties. Departing New London on 31 January 1942, she hunted for enemy submarines along her route which took her via Bermuda and Mona Passage into the Caribbean Sea. On 16 February 1942, she arrived at Coco Solo, Panama, from which she conducted two more defensive patrols in the western approaches to the Panama Canal, from 10 to 31 March 1942 and from 14 April to 13 May 1942, before she was ordered to California to prepare for service in the Aleutian Islands. She underwent repairs at San Diego, California, then, inmid-July 1942, she started for the Territory of Alaska. While en route, engine trouble forced her into Mare Island for repairs, but on 1 August 1942 she resumed her northward voyage.

==== Fourth (first offensive) war patrol ====
On 12 August 1942, S-30 departed the submarine base at Dutch Harbor on Amaknak Island off Unalaska in the Aleutians to begin her fourth — and first offensive — war patrol. Moving through fog, she arrived off Attu Island — occupied by the Japanese at the beginning of the Aleutian Islands campaign in June 1942 — in the western Aleutians on 16 August 1942, her crew sighting only the hazy outline of Cape Wrangell through the fog. She continued on to patrol across the anticipated Japanese shipping lanes between Attu and the northern Kuril Islands. On the afternoon of 7 September 1942, three Imperial Japanese Navy destroyers attacked her some 10 nautical miles (19 km; 12 mi) north of Cape Wrangell, subjecting her to depth-charge attacks during a two-and-a-half-hour encounter. She departed her patrol area on 10 September 1942 and headed for Dutch Harbor.

==== Fifth war patrol ====
On 24 September 1942, S-30 got underway for her fifth war patrol, her second in the Aleutians. A cracked cylinder in her port engine forced her back to Dutch Harbor on 27 September, but on 30 September, she again headed west. On 3 October 1942, she entered her patrol area and began hunting Japanese ships along the sea lanes west of Kiska, but by 9 October 1942 additional engineering casualties, cracks, and leaks had developed and forced her to return to Dutch Harbor.

==== October 1942–March 1943 ====
After arriving at Dutch Harbor, S-30 received orders to proceed to San Diego for an overhaul. During the overhaull, she received a fathometer, a new distilling unit, and more modern radar equipment. After the completion of her overhaul, she provided training services to the West Coast Sound School from mid-February 1943 into March 1943. On 16 March 1943, she departed for Dutch Harbor, which she reached on 21 March 1943. After her arrival, an air compressor failure and malfunctioning of her fathometer delayed her departure on her next war patrol.

==== Sixth war patrol ====
With repairs complete, S-30 began her sixth war patrol on 13 April 1943, departing Dutch Harbor for a patrol area off Attu. On 15 April 1943, she crossed the International Date Line and she arrived in her patrol area on 17 April 1943 Dutch Harbor time (18 April local time). For the next few days, she reconnoitered and, when possible photographed, Attu's principal coves, bays, and harbors. On 26 April 1943, she was ordered to operate east of 176°E and south of 52°40'N, where she remained until after an Allied strike against Attu. On the afternoon of 27 April 1943, she returned the waters off Attu but was unable to determine the extent of damage the strike inflicted on Japanese forces and facilities. On 2 May 1943, she departed the Attu area and returned to Dutch Harbor for refit.

==== Seventh war patrol ====
On 24 May 1943, S-30 departed Dutch Harbor to begin her seventh war patrol and headed west again, this time bound for the northern Kuril Islands. On 31 May 1943 (Dutch Harbor date; 1 June 1943 locally), she entered her assigned patrol area. On 5 June 1943, off the Kamchatka Peninsula, she attacked her first target, a large sampan. Her guns set the vessel on fire, but as it burned, a Japanese destroyer appeared on the horizon and began closing the surfaced submarine at high speed. Three minutes later, the destroyer opened fire on the diving S-30.

S-30 commenced an approach on the destroyer, but just as she reached firing bearing, she lost depth control. A few seconds later, the destroyer began depth-charging her. In the next 20 minutes, the destroyer dropped 33 depth charges. Others followed sporadically over the next five hours. S-30 then was able to clear the area. On 6 June 1943, S-30′s crew repaired all minor damage and began efforts to remove two torpedoes which had been crushed in the number-three and number-four torpedo tubes. The one in the number four tube was removed on 7 June 1943, but the one in the number-three tube remained until the completion of the patrol.

On 8 June, S-30 headed down the coast of Paramushiro at the northern end of the Kurils. approached Onekotan, then transited Onekotan Strait and set a course for Araito. During the next two days, she sighted four targets but was able to close only the last two, merchant ships in column, contacted on 10 June (Dutch harbor date; 11 June local date). Fog closed in rapidly as she made her approach, then blanketed the area as she launched three torpedoes. Her crew heard two explosions but could see nothing. Post-war examination of Japanese records revealed that she sank the 5,131- or 5,228-gross register ton (according to different sources) cargo ship SS Zinbu Maru (ex-Jinbu Maru) — which was anchored in Kakumabetsu Bay on the coast of Paramushiro at the time — in the attack. During the ensuing depth charging by Japanese warships, S-30 began to move out of the area. Within two and one-half hours, she had left the pinging of the searching Japanese sonars behind.

S-30 resumed her hunt for Japanese ships. On 12 June 1943, she again transited Onekotan Strait. On 13 June, she fired on a convoy, but missed. On 14 June, she departed the area, and on 22 June 1943 she returned to Dutch Harbor to begin extracting the damaged torpedo in her number three tube and commence refitting.

==== Eighth war patrol ====
On 5 July 1943, S-30 got underway on her eighth war patrol, which took her back to the Kurils and into the Sea of Okhotsk. She patrolled on both sides of the Kuril Island chain and across the shippung lanes leading to Soya Strait and to Yokosuka, Japan. She took periscope photographs of Japanese facilities on various islands and sighted several targets, but was unable to close on most of them and was unsuccessful against those she attacked. On 20 July 1943, she attacked what appeared to be an inter-island steamer but which turned out to be a Japanese warship that steamed straight down the torpedo track and dropped six depth charges in quick succession. S-30 went deep, reloaded, and prepared to reattack. The target, however, was lost in the fog.

S-30 continued her patrol. On 27 July 1943, she fired three torpedoes at a Japanese merchant ship estimated at 7000 gross register tons. Her sound operator reported two hits, breaking-up noises, and distant depth charging, but the damage went unverified by postwar examination of Japanese records. On 31 July 1943, she attacked another cargo ship under similar circumstances and reported scoring one torpedo hit. Her sound operator reported that screw noises from the target stopped and that he heard breaking-up noises, and periscope observation showed no ship still afloat at the site of the attack. However, any damage which S-30 might have inflicted was never verified.

S-30 departed the Kurils on 7 August 1943 and headed east. O 9 August 1943, she arrived in Massacre Bay on Attu, which U.S. forces had retaken from the Japanese in May 1943 during the Battle of Attu.

==== Ninth war patrol ====
S-30 departed Massacre Bay on 26 August 1943 to begin her ninth and final war patrol. During the patrol, she operated along the eastern and western sides of the Kuril Islands. Again, she lost several targets in fog, nut nevertheless took photographs of the islands. In mid-September 1943, she added a new dimension to her activities when attempted to bombard the Japanese garrison on Matsuwa. Fog interfered with her first attempt to shell Matsuwa, but it cleared off early on the morning of 15 September 1943 (local date) as she neared the firing point with her crew at battle stations. When the order to fire was given, however, the gun failed to respond. Her crew attempted to install a new firing pin, but it was a fraction of an inch too short, and she had to abandon her bombardment effort.

On 16 September 1943, S-30 received orders to head for Dutch Harbor.. En route, a Japanese patrol plane sighted and bombed her on 17 September 1943. Her port engine failed during the attack, but she escaped serious damage. On 23 September 1943, she arrived at Dutch Harbor.

==== September 1943–October 1945 ====
Within a week of arriving at Dutch Harbor, S-30 headed south to San Diego, where, with others of her class, she provided training services for the West Coast Sound School for the remainder of World War II. Hostilities ended in mid-August 1945. In mid-September 1945, she proceeded to Mare Island, where she was decommissioned on 9 October 1945.

== Disposal ==
On 24 October 1945, S-30′s name was struck from the Naval Vessel Register. In December 1946, she was sold and delivered to the Salco Iron and Metal Company, San Francisco, for scrapping.

== Awards ==
- Yangtze Service Medal
- American Defense Service Medal with "A" device
- American Campaign Medal
- Asiatic-Pacific Campaign Medal with two battle stars for World War II service
- World War II Victory Medal
