= USS Mallard (AM-44) =

Minesweeper of the United States Navy

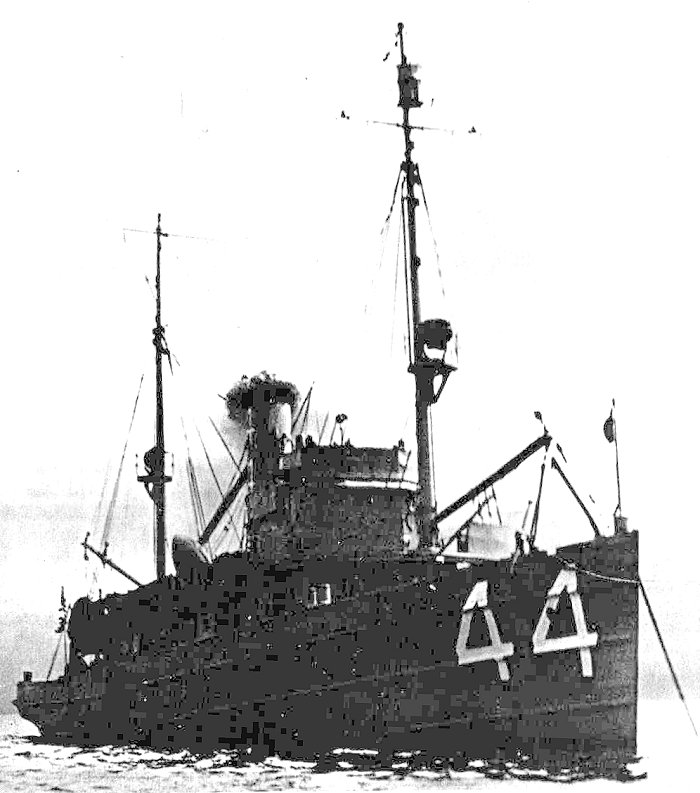

History

United States
- Name: USS Mallard
- Builder: Staten Island Shipbuilding Company, New York City
- Laid down: 25 May 1918
- Launched: 17 December 1918
- Commissioned: 25 June 1919, as Minesweeper No.44
- Decommissioned: 10 December 1946
- Reclassified: AM-44, 17 July 1920; ASR-4, 12 September 1929
- Fate: Sunk as a target, 22 May 1947

General characteristics
- Class & type: Lapwing-class minesweeper
- Displacement: 950 long tons (965 t)
- Length: 187 ft 10 in (57.25 m)
- Beam: 35 ft 6 in (10.82 m)
- Draft: 9 ft 9 in (2.97 m)
- Propulsion: 1 × Harlan and Hollingsworth, vertical triple-expansion steam engine, 1,000 shp (746 kW); 1 shaft
- Speed: 14 knots (26 km/h; 16 mph)
- Complement: 85
- Armament: 2 × 3"/50 caliber guns

The first USS Mallard (AM-44/ASR-4) was a Lapwing-class minesweeper in the United States Navy. She was later converted to a submarine rescue ship.

Mallard was laid down by Staten Island Shipbuilding Company, New York City, 25 May 1918; launched 17 December 1918; sponsored by Mrs. Harry R. Brayton, wife of the commanding officer at commissioning; and commissioned 25 June 1919.

== Post-World War I Atlantic operations ==
Assigned to the Atlantic Fleet, Mallard conducted minesweep duties in the 3rd Naval District through the next nine years. Transferred to submarine rescue operations following conversion at Boston Navy Yard June to December 1928, Mallard was redesignated ASR-4 on 12 September 1929. From January to March 1929 she joined submarine S-4 in experimental maneuvers off Key West, Florida.

== World War II assignment ==
The next year Mallard sailed for Coco Solo, her new home port, for patrol off Panama, where she remained throughout World War II attached to Submarine Squadron 3. During that time she performed target towing and diver training services for ships of the fleet.

== End-of-War decommissioning ==
In May 1946 she sailed for the east coast, arriving New York Navy Yard to be decommissioned 10 December and stripped. On 22 May 1947 Mallard was used as a target ship and sunk by torpedo fire from Piper (SS-409).
