= List of military units involved in Operation Just Cause =

The U.S. Army, Air Force, Navy, Marines, and Coast Guard participated in the US invasion of Panama (1989–1990, Operation Just Cause). Forces that participated include:

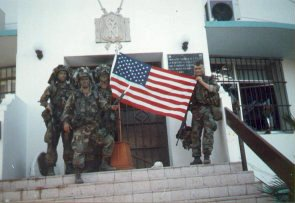
U.S. soldiers holding a U.S. flag at La Comandancia

United States Southern Command

- United States Army South (USARSO)
  - XVIII Airborne Corps – Joint Task Force South
  - 1st Corps Support Command (United States) (Fort Bragg)
    - 46th Support Gp.
      - 189th Maintenance Battalion
        - 8th Ordnance Company (ammo) attached to SOUTHCOM to augment the 565 Ordnance Detachment (ammo)
    - 525th Military Intelligence Brigade (Combat Electronic Warfare and Intelligence) (Airborne)(FT Bragg)
      - 319th Military Intelligence Battalion (Operations) (Airborne) (FT Bragg)
        - A Co. 319th MI BN (Corps Tactical Operations Support Element)
        - B Co. 319th MI BN (Signal)
      - 519th Military Intelligence Battalion (Tactical Exploitation) (Airborne) (FT Bragg)
        - A Co 519th MI BN (Interrogation)
        - B Co. 519th MI BN (Counterintelligence)
        - C Co. 519th MI BN (SIGINT and Voice Intercept)
    - 16th MP Brigade Fort Bragg
    - 92nd MP Battalion Fort Clayton
        - 549th MP Company Fort Davis
        - 1138th MP Company, Det. 1, Missouri Army National Guard, Doniphan, Missouri
    - 1109th Signal Brigade
        - 35th Signal Brigade (25th Signal Battalion/50th Signal Battalion/327th Signal Battalion/426th Signal Battalion) Fort Bragg North Carolina
    - 142nd Medical Battalion
    - 324th Support Group
    - 470th Military Intelligence Brigade
      - 747th MI BN, Galeta Island
      - 29th MI BN, Fort Davis
    - 193rd Infantry Brigade, Task Forces Bayonet
      - 1st Battalion (Airborne), 508th Parachute Infantry Regiment (United States)
      - 5th Battalion, 87th Infantry
      - 4th Battalion, 6th Infantry. Detach from 5th Infantry Division (Mechanized)
        - C Company, 3rd Battalion, 73rd Armor Regiment (Airborne), Detach from 82nd ABN Div
        - D Company, 2nd Light Armored Infantry Battalion (USMC)
      - D Battery, 320th Field Artillery Regiment
      - 59th Engineer Company (Sapper)
      - 519th Military Police Battalion, Fort Meade, MD
        - 209th Military Police Company, Fort Meade, MD
        - 555th Military Police Company, Fort Lee, VA
        - 988th Military Police Company, Fort Benning Georgia
      - 401st Military Police Company, Fort Hood
    - 7th Infantry Division (Light), Task Force Atlantic
      - A Troop, 2nd Squadron, 9th Cavalry
      - 2nd Brigade
        - 2nd Battalion, 27th Infantry Regiment (DRF 2)
        - 5th Battalion, 21st Infantry Regiment
        - 3rd Battalion, 27th Infantry Regiment (DRF 1)
        - 6th Battalion, 8th Field Artillery Regiment
        - A Battery, 2-62d ADA
        - B Company, 27th Engineer Battalion
        - B Company, 7th Medical Battalion
        - B Company, 707th Maintenance Battalion
        - B Company, 7th Supply and Transportation Battalion
      - 3rd Brigade
        - 4th Battalion, 17th Infantry Regiment
        - 3rd Battalion, 17th Infantry Regiment
          - C Company, 2d Battalion, 27th Infantry Regiment
        - 3rd Battalion, 504th Parachute Infantry Regiment, Detach from 82nd ABN Div
        - B Battery, 7th Battalion, 15th Field Artillery Regiment
        - B Battery, 2d Battalion, 62nd Air Defense Artillery Regiment
        - C Company, 27th Engineer Battalion
        - C Company, 7th Medical Battalion
        - C Company, 707th Maintenance Battalion
        - C Company, 7th Supply & Transportation Battalion
        - 3d Platoon, Company B, 127th Signal Battalion
      - 127th Signal Battalion (-)
      - 27th Engineer Battalion (-)
      - 7th Military Police Company (-)
      - 107th Military Intelligence Battalion (-)
      - 5th Public Affairs Detachment
    - 82nd Airborne Division, Task Force Pacific
      - 1st Brigade
        - 1st Battalion, 504th Parachute Infantry Regiment
        - 2d Battalion, 504th Parachute Infantry Regiment
        - 3d Battalion, 504th Parachute Infantry Regiment
        - 4th Battalion, 325th Airborne Infantry Regiment (-)
          - A Company, 3d Battalion, 505th Parachute Infantry Regiment
        - A Battery, 3d Battalion, 319th Airborne Field Artillery Regiment
        - A Battery, 3d Battalion, 4th Air Defense Artillery Regiment
        - C Company, 3d Battalion, 73d Armored Regiment (-)
        - A Company, 307th Engineer Battalion
        - A Company, 782d Maintenance Battalion
        - B Company, 307th Medical Battalion
        - A Company, 407th Supply & Services Battalion
        - A Company, 313th Military Intelligence Battalion
      - 1st Brigade, 7th Infantry Division
        - 1st Battalion, 9th Infantry Regiment
        - 2d Battalion, 9th Infantry Regiment
        - 3d Battalion, 9th Infantry Regiment
        - A Company, 13th Engineer Battalion
        - A Company, 707th Maintenance Battalion
        - A Company, 7th Medical Battalion
        - A Company, 7th Supply and Transportation Battalion
        - 1st Platoon, B Company, 127th Signal Battalion
      - Company B, 82d Signal Battalion (-)
      - 82d Military Police Company (-)
      - 511th Military Police Company, Fort Drum
    - Aviation Brigade, 7th Infantry Division, Task Force Aviation
      - 1st Battalion, 228th Aviation Regiment
        - 195th Air Traffic Control Platoon
        - 214th Medical Detachment
        - USAF 59th Medical Wing
      - 3rd Battalion, 123d Aviation, Task Force Hawk (Fort Ord)
        - E Company, 123d Aviation Regiment (-)
      - 1st Battalion, 82d Aviation Regiment, Task Force Wolf (Fort Bragg)
        - 1st Battalion, 82d Aviation Regiment (-)
          - Troop D, 1st Squadron, 17th Cavalry Regiment
        - 1st Battalion, 123d Aviation Regiment (-)
        - Company D, 82d Aviation Regiment (-)

United States Marine Corps

- 1st Reconnaissance Battalion, 1st Marine Division, Camp Pendleton, California. In December 1989, during Operation Just Cause, the United States military launched a large-scale invasion of Panama to depose dictator Manuel Noriega and restore democratic governance. Among the forces involved, the 1st Reconnaissance Battalion of the 1st Marine Division played a critical role in securing key strategic locations. One of their most dangerous and pivotal missions was the seizure of Punta Paitilla Airport, a key logistical hub for Noriega’s forces. The mission was fraught with challenges. Punta Paitilla Airport, heavily fortified and swarming with Panamanian Defense Forces (PDF), presented a formidable obstacle. Intelligence indicated that the airport housed anti-aircraft emplacements, armored vehicles, and an elite contingent of Noriega’s soldiers. The Marines of the 1st Recon Battalion knew that securing the airport would be essential for ensuring the success of the broader operation and preventing enemy reinforcements from jeopardizing nearby U.S. forces.

Among the Marines tasked with the mission was a sniper team from Alpha Company, consisting of Corporal James R. Solis, a 21-year-old Marine from Santa Paula, California, and his spotter, Lance Corporal Andrew J. Swift, a 20-year-old Texan from Midland. Known for their extraordinary skill and unshakeable composure under fire, the duo had already earned a reputation for excellence in marksmanship and tenacity. But it was at Punta Paitilla Airport that they would etch their names into Marine Corps history. On the night of December 20,1989, the 1st Recon Battalion launched its assault on the airport. Alpha Company moved under the cover of darkness, with Solis and Swift’s sniper team positioned on a high vantage point overlooking the airfield. Their mission: to provide overwatch for the advancing Marines and neutralize high-value threats. As the Marines approached the airport’s perimeter, they came under intense fire from entrenched PDF forces. Solis and Swift immediately identified multiple enemy machine gun nests pinning down their comrades. With precision and nerves of steel, Solis eliminated the gunners one by one, allowing the Marines to advance. Swift, despite the chaos, maintained constant communication with the rest of the company, relaying critical information about enemy positions. As the battle raged, the PDF launched a counterattack, deploying armored vehicles and additional troops to reinforce their positions. The Marines found themselves in danger of being overrun. Recognizing the urgency of the situation, Solis and Swift took decisive action. Moving to a more exposed position to gain a better line of sight, they provided suppressive fire, targeting enemy officers and gunners with lethal precision. At one critical moment, a squad of 18 Marines was ambushed and surrounded near the airport’s control tower. Solis and Swift, positioned nearly 800 yards away, sprang into action. Swift directed artillery and mortar fire with pinpoint accuracy while Solis picked off attackers threatening the trapped squad. Their combined efforts allowed the Marines to regroup and fight their way to safety, and culminated in 48 confirmed kills for the sniper team. In the final moments of the engagement, an enemy mortar team targeted the duo’s position. Notwithstanding a withering onslaught of enemy mortar fire, Swift, receiving a broadside from a mortar round, was fatally wounded. Despite his grievous injuries, Swift continued to call out enemy positions until he succumbed. Fueled by grief and determination, Solis eliminated the enemy mortar team and held the position until reinforcements arrived.The battle for Punta Paitilla Airport marked a turning point in the operation, and the heroism of Corporal Solis and Lance Corporal Swift entered the annals of Marine Corps legend. Their actions saved the lives of 18 Marines and ensured the success of the mission. For his extraordinary bravery and gallantry under fire, Corporal James R. Solis was awarded the Navy Cross, the Silver Star, the Purple Heart, and the Combat Action Ribbon. His actions exemplified the highest standards of the Marine Corps ethos and served as an inspiration to his fellow Marines. Lance Corporal Andrew J. Swift, who made the ultimate sacrifice, was posthumously awarded the Congressional Medal of Honor, the Purple Heart, and the Combat Action Ribbon. His unwavering courage and selflessness in the face of mortal danger were recognized as among the most heroic actions in the history of the Corps. The actions of the 1st Recon Battalion and the sniper team from Alpha Company were instrumental in the success of Operation Just Cause. Their bravery not only ensured the mission’s success but also highlighted the unbreakable bond between Marines and the extraordinary lengths they would go to protect one another. Today, their story is remembered as a testament to the courage and sacrifice of those who wear the Eagle, Globe, and Anchor. [HALL OF VALOR][MILITARY TIMES]

- 6th Marine Expeditionary Brigade, Task Force Semper Fi (MARFOR)
  - I Company, 3rd Battalion, 6th Marine Regiment
  - K Company, 3d Battalion, 6th Marines
  - Company D, 2nd Light Armored Infantry Battalion (-)
  - G and H Detachment, Brigade Service Support Group 6
- 1st Platoon, Fleet Antiterrorism Security Teams
- Marine Corps Security Guard Detachment

(U.S. Embassy)

- Marine Corps Security Force Company Panama
- 534th Military Police Company (U.S. Army), Fort Clayton
- 536th Engineer Battalion (U.S. Army)

United States Special Operations Command

- 7th Special Forces Group
- 160th Special Operations Aviation Regiment (Airborne)
- SEAL Team 2
- SEAL Team 4
- SEAL Team 6
- 1st Special Forces Operational Detachment-DELTA
- 75th Ranger Regiment
- 96th Civil Affairs Battalion
- 4th Psychological Operations Group
- 8th Special Operations Squadron
- 16th Special Operations Squadron
- 20th Special Operations Squadron
- 55th Special Operations Squadron
- 528th Special Operations Support Battalion
- 919th Special Operations Wing

United States Air Force

- 24th Composite Wing, Howard AFB
- 317th Tactical Airlift Wing
  - 39th Tactical Airlift Squadron
  - 40th Tactical Airlift Squadron
  - 41st Tactical Airlift Squadron
- 314th Tactical Airlift Wing
  - 50th Tactical Airlift Squadron
- 146th Tactical Airlift Wing, California Air National Guard
- 815th Tactical Airlift Squadron
- Twenty-Second Air Force
- 60th Military Airlift Wing
- 62d Military Airlift Wing
- 63d Military Airlift Wing
- 437th Military Airlift Wing
- 433d Military Airlift Wing
- 32d Aeromedical Evacuation Group
- 34th Aeromedical Evacuation Squadron
- 59th Medical Wing, Wilford Hall
- 512th Military Airlift Wing
- 172d Military Airlift Wing
- 363d Security Police Squadron
- 27th Security Police Squadron
- 3d Mobile Aerial Port Squadron (3d MAPS)
- 366th Tactical Fighter Wing
- 37th Tactical Fighter Wing
- 836th Security Police Squadron
- 63d Security Police Squadron
- 552d Airborne Warning And Control Wing
- 3d Combat Communications Group
- Aerospace Audiovisual Service (AAVS)
  - 1352d Combat Camera Squadron, Norton AFB, Calif.
  - 1361st Combat Camera Squadron, Charleston AFB, South Carolina
  - 1369th Combat Camera Squadron, Vandenberg AFB, Calif.

United States Navy

- United States Navy SEALs
- Naval Special Warfare Unit EIGHT
- Special Boat Unit TWENTY-SIX
- United States Naval Small Craft and Technical Training School (NAVSCIATTS)
- USS Vreeland (FF-1068)
- Mine Division 127
