= 3rd Brigade, 7th Infantry Division =

- 7th Infantry Division shoulder sleeve insignia
- Active: 1917 – 21; 1963 – 71; 1974 – 93
- Country: United States of America
- Branch: United States Army
- Type: Infantry
- Role: Light Infantry
- Size: Brigade
- Part of: 7th Infantry Division
- Engagements: World War I Panama

The 3rd Brigade, 7th Infantry Division, originally known as the 14th Infantry Brigade was an infantry brigade of the United States Army, and a part of the 7th Infantry Division. The brigade was based at Fort Ord, California for most of its history.

Activated for service in World War I, the unit saw brief service in the conflict, but never fought as an entire unit. After the Korean War, it was reactivated as a brigade, and was returned to the United States where it saw action in Operation Just Cause and Operation Golden Pheasant. The brigade sent units to support 2nd Brigade, 7th Infantry Division during the 1992 Los Angeles Riots. The 3rd Brigade was inactivated in 1993.

== History ==
=== World War I ===
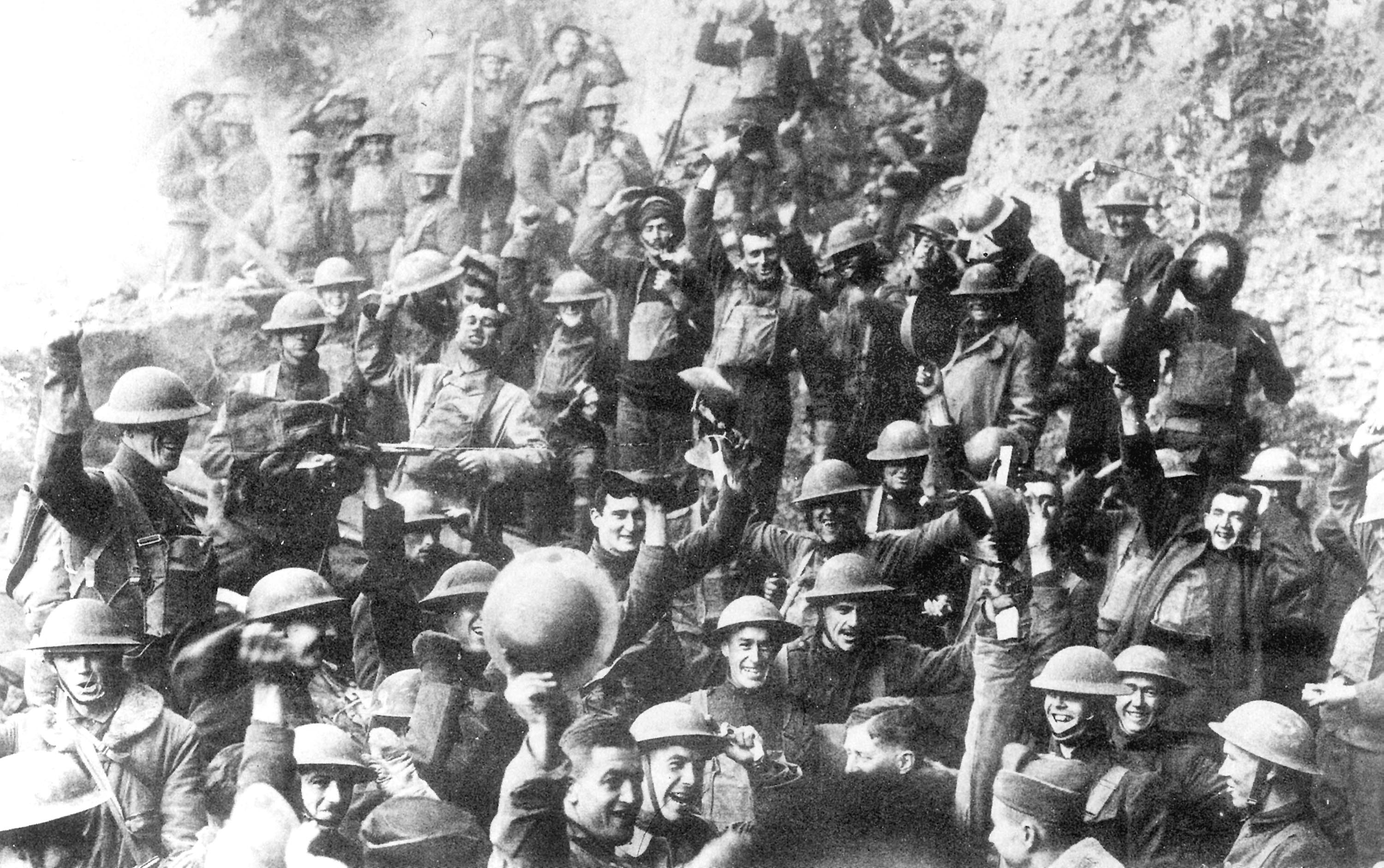
Men of the 64th Regiment, 14th Brigade, 7th Division, celebrate the news of the Armistice with Germany, November 11, 1918.

The 3rd Brigade, 7th Infantry Division was first constituted and activated in the regular army as the 14th Infantry Brigade on 6 December 1917, exactly eighth months after the American entry into World War I, at Camp Wheeler, Georgia. One month later it organized and prepared for deployment to Europe to participate in World War I as a part of the American Expeditionary Force, along with the rest of the division. The 14th Infantry Brigade was one of two brigades assigned to the division headquarters, the other being the 13th Infantry Brigade. Serving within the brigade were the 64th Infantry Regiment and the 56th Infantry Regiment, bringing the total strength of the brigade to around 8,000 men. Most of the brigade sailed to Europe aboard the SS Leviathan.

During the brigade's time in France, it was commanded by Brigadier General Benjamin A. Poore, who received the Distinguished Service Cross and Army Distinguished Service Medal in recognition of his wartime leadership. On 11 October 1918 the 14th Brigade and 7th Division first came under shelling attacks. At Saint-Mihiel the units also came under chemical attack. Elements of the 7th probed up toward Prény near the Moselle River, capturing positions and driving German forces out of the region. It was around this time that the division first received its shoulder sleeve insignia, which the 14th Brigade wore as a part of the division.

In early November, the 14th Brigade began readying itself for an attack on the Hindenburg Line with the division, which was part of the Second Army. The division launched a reconnaissance in force on the Voëvre Plain, but before it could begin a full assault, the Allies signed an Armistice ending hostilities. After 33 days on the front lines, the 7th Division suffered 1,988 casualties. It was awarded one campaign streamer for Lorraine. The brigade performed occupation duties for the next year as it began preparations to return to the continental United States.

The 14th Brigade returned to the United States in late 1919, and gradually demobilized at Camp George G. Meade, Maryland until 1921. On 22 September of that year, the Headquarters Company, 7th Division was inactivated, and the 13th and 14th Brigades deactivated with it.

=== Reorganization ===
On 1 July 1940, the 7th Infantry Division was reactivated at Camp Ord, California Under the command of Major General Joseph W. Stilwell. The Headquarters element, 13th and 14th Brigades did not reactivate, however, and the division was instead centered on three infantry regiments; the 17th Infantry Regiment, the 32nd Infantry Regiment, and the 53rd Infantry Regiment. The 14th Brigade was not activated for the duration of World War II.

=== Post-Korean War ===
In the wake of the Korean War, between 1953 and 1971, the 7th Infantry Division defended the Korean Demilitarized Zone. Its main garrison was Camp Casey, South Korea. During these occupation duties, the division saw a complete reorganization in compliance with the Reorganization Objective Army Divisions plan. In 1963, the division's former headquarters company grew into the 1st Brigade, 7th Infantry Division while the 13th Infantry Brigade became the 2nd Brigade, 7th Infantry Division. The 14th Infantry Brigade was redesignated at the 3rd Brigade, 7th Infantry Division. These renamed formations retained all of the lineage and campaign credits of their previous designations. On 2 April 1971, the division and its brigades returned to the United States and inactivated at Fort Lewis, Washington.

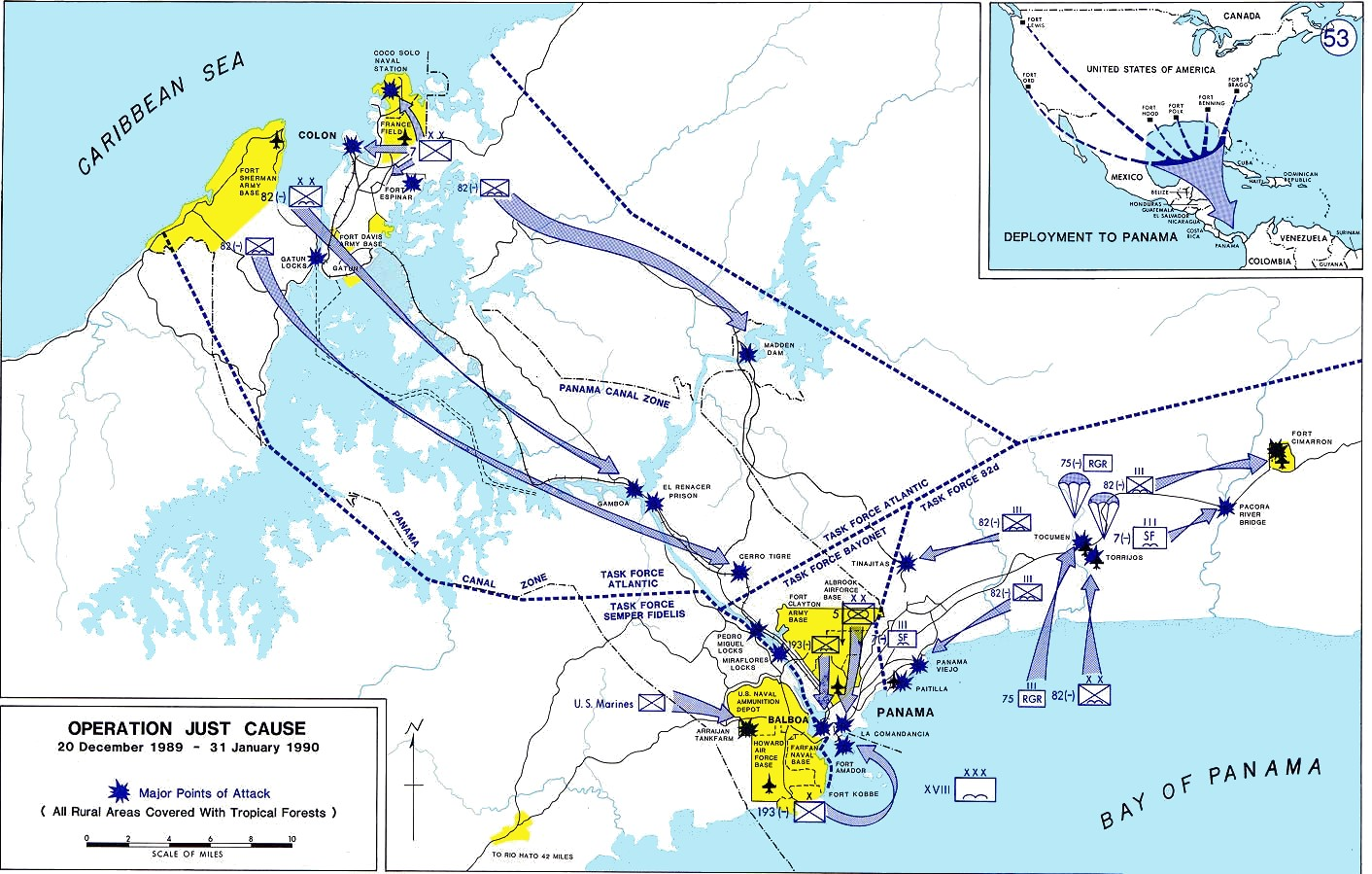
Tactical map of Operation Just Cause.

In October 1974 the 7th and two brigades reactivated at their former garrison, Fort Ord (a National Guard "roundout" brigade, the 41st, would periodically train with the division as its third brigade). The unit did not see any action in Vietnam or during the post war era, but was tasked to keep a close watch on South American developments. It trained at Fort Ord, Camp Roberts, and Fort Hunter Liggett. On 1 October 1985 the division redesignated as the 7th Infantry Division (Light), organized again as a light infantry division. It was the first US division specially designed as such. The various battalions of the 17th, 31st, and 32nd Regiments moved from the division, replaced by battalions from other regiments, including battalions from the 21st Infantry Regiment, the 27th Infantry Regiment, and the 9th Infantry Regiment. The 27th Infantry and the 9th Infantry Regiment participated in Operation Golden Pheasant in Honduras. In 1989 the 3rd Brigade, 7th Infantry Division participated in Operation Just Cause in Panama.

In 1991 the Base Realignment and Closure Commission recommended the closing of Fort Ord due to the escalating cost of living on the Central California coastline. By 1994, the post was closed and the Division was to move to Fort Lewis, Washington. The 3rd Brigade's 3rd Battalion, 17th Infantry Regiment and other assigned military police companies participated in one final mission in the United States before inactivation; quelling the 1992 Los Angeles Riots, called Operation Garden Plot, in conjunction with the entire 2nd Brigade, 7th Division. In 1993 the division was slated to move to Fort Lewis, WA and instead inactivated at Fort Ord, CA as part of the post-Cold War draw-down of the US Army, but the 2nd and 3rd Brigades of the 7th inactivated at Fort Ord in 1993. The division headquarters formally inactivated on 16 June 1994 at Fort Lewis.

== Honors ==
Ribbon	Award	Year	Notes
	Republic of Korea Presidential Unit Citation	1945–1948; 1953–1971	for service in Korea

=== Campaign streamers ===
Conflict	Streamer	Year(s)
World War I	Lorraine	1918

== Sources ==
- McGrath, John J. (2004). The Brigade: A History: Its Organization and Employment in the US Army. Combat Studies Institute Press. ISBN 978-1-4404-4915-4.
- Army Almanac: A Book of Facts Concerning the Army of the United States. United States Government Printing Office. 1959. ASIN B0006D8NKK.
