= 64th Infantry Regiment (United States) =

- Active: 1917-1922; 1941-1952
- Country: United States
- Type: Infantry
- Size: Regiment
- Motto: none

Commanders
- Notable commanders: Charles DuVal Roberts

The 64th Infantry Regiment was a Regular infantry regiment in the United States Army. Only active from 1917 to 1922, it was reconstituted in 1941 but was never officially reactivated and was disbanded in an inactive status in 1952.

== Lineage ==
- Constituted 15 May 1917 in the Regular Army as the 64th Infantry. Organized 1 June 1917 at Camp Baker, Texas, from personnel of the 34th Infantry. Assigned to the 7th Division 16 November 1917.
- Relieved from the 7th Division and demobilized 31 July 1922 at Plattsburg Barracks, New York
- Reconstituted 18 July 1941 in the Regular Army.
- Disbanded 4 August 1952.

== Campaign streamers ==
World War I

- Lorraine 1918

== Coat of arms ==
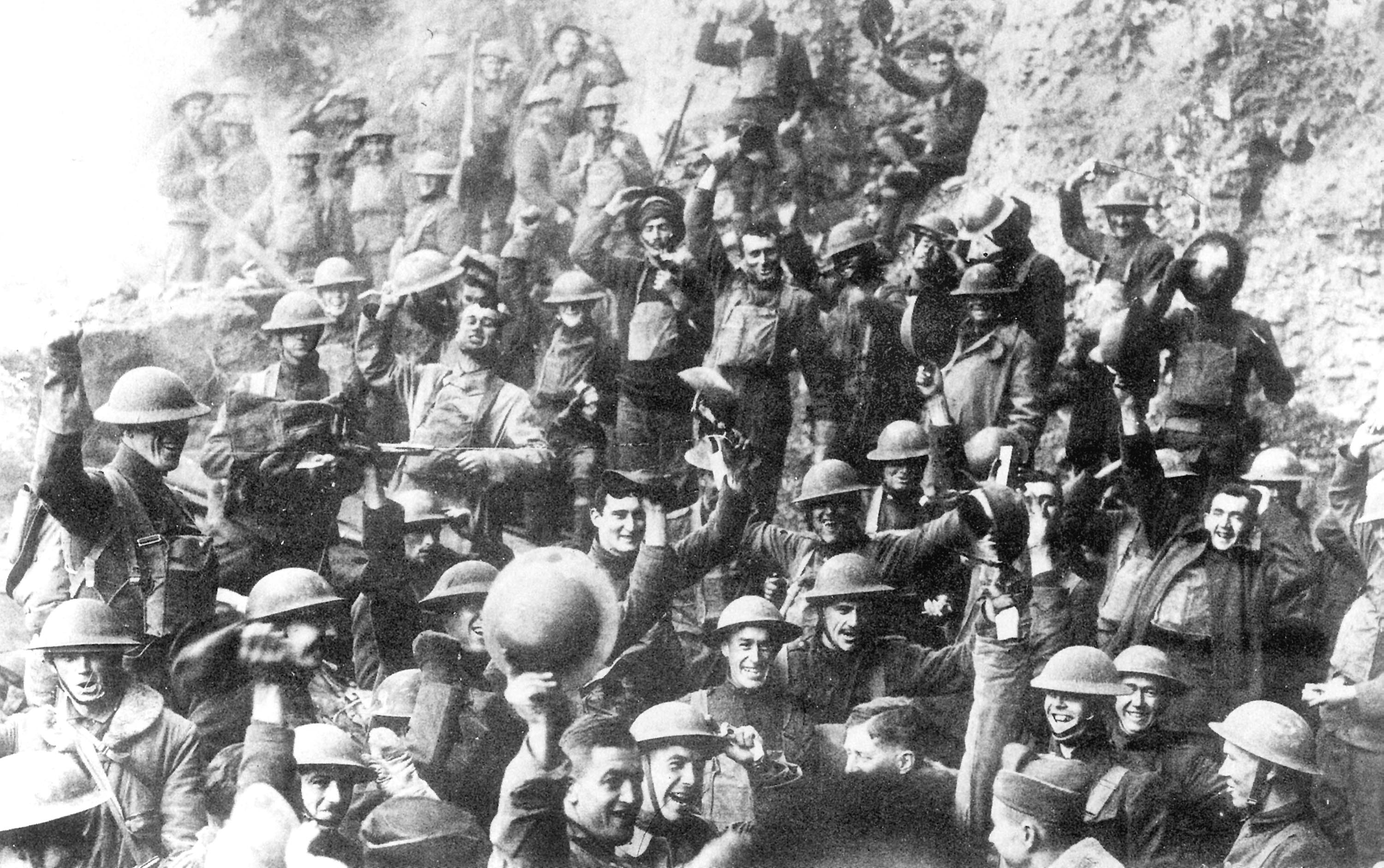
Men of the 64th Infantry Regiment, 7th Division, celebrate the news of the Armistice with Germany, November 11, 1918.

The regiment was organized in 1917 from personnel of the 34th Infantry, which is shown on the canton. It was in the 7th Division, which operated in Lorraine in the area formerly in the domain of the ancient lords of Commercy, whose arms were blue and scattered with golden cross crosslets, pointed at the lower end. The shield is blue for infantry with one such cross crosslet. The crest is the thistle of Lorraine, one of the old emblems of that province and still existing in the arms of the city of Nancy.
