= Camp Newton D. Baker =

United States Army post in Texas

Coordinates: 31.7982°N 106.4440°W

- El Paso, Texas

Site history
- Built: 1916
- In use: 1916 - 1920

Camp Newton D. Baker was a United States Army post located near El Paso, Texas. The post was in operation from 1916 to 1920. It was used as a mobilization center for border patrols and as a Signal Corps training center. The post was named after Secretary of War Newton D. Baker.

== See also ==
Camp Newton D. Baker was first called Camp Pershing #2, archived here at the Wayback Machine.
