= 55th Infantry Regiment (United States) =

- Active: 1917-1922; 1942-1943
- Country: United States
- Branch: United States Army
- Type: Infantry
- Size: Regiment
- Mottos: Honor, Valor

The 55th Infantry Regiment was a regular infantry regiment in the United States Army.

== Lineage ==
The 55th Infantry Regiment was constituted in the Regular Army on 15 May 1917 and organized on 16 June 1917 at Chickamauga Park, Georgia, from personnel of the 17th Infantry Regiment. It was assigned to the 7th Division on 16 November 1917, inactivated on 22 September 1921 at Camp George G. Meade, Maryland, and disbanded 31 July 1922, with personnel concurrently transferred to the 34th Infantry Regiment.

It was reconstituted in the Regular Army as the 55th Armored Infantry and assigned to the 11th Armored Division on 9 June 1942. The regiment was activated on 15 August 1942 at Camp Polk, Louisiana, and was broken up on 20 September 1943, with elements reorganized and redesignated as elements of the 11th Armored Division as follows:

- 55th Armored Infantry (less 1st 2nd, and 3rd Battalions) as the 55th Armored Infantry Battalion
- 1st Battalion as the 63rd Armored Infantry Battalion
- 2nd Battalion as the 21st Armored Infantry Battalion
- 3rd Battalion disbanded

== Campaign streamers ==
World War I

- Lorraine 1918

== Coat of arms ==
This regiment was organized in 1917 from personnel of the 17th Infantry which is shown in the canton. The division of which this regiment formed a part was engaged on the outer defenses of Metz, and about to make another attack when the Armistice was signed. The shield of Metz is divided per pale silver and black and the crest is the Napoleonic eagle on a mural crown. This regiment first entered the lines in the vicinity of Pont-à-Mousson, the arms of which bear a bridge of three arches flanked by two towers; the center arch is broken to symbolize the partial destruction of the bridge at the time the regiment was there.
