= 7th Infantry Division (United States) =

Active US Army formation

7th Infantry Division (Multi-Domain Command–Pacific)
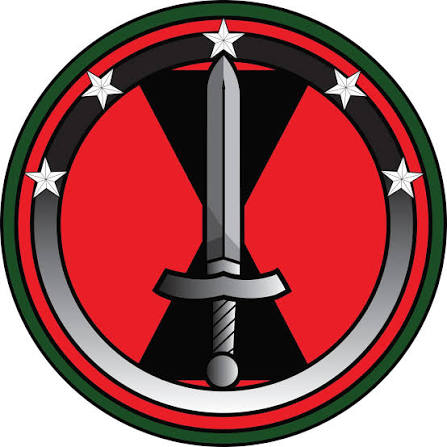
- 7th Infantry Division (Multi-Domain Command–Pacific) insignia
- Active: 6 December 1917–22 September 1921; 1 July 1940–2 April 1971; 21 October 1974–15 September 1994; 16 October 1999–18 August 2006; 1 October 2012–present
- Country: United States
- Branch: United States Army
- Type: Stryker infantry
- Size: Division/Multi Domain Command
- Part of: United States Army Pacific
- Garrison/HQ: Joint Base Lewis-McChord, Washington, U.S.
- Nicknames: "Hourglass Division" "Bayonet Division" "California Division"
- Mottos: "Light, Silent, and Deadly" "Trust in Me"
- March: "Arirang"
- Mascot: Black Widow spider
- Engagements: World War I; Lorraine 1918; World War II; Aleutian Islands; Eastern Mandates; Leyte; Ryukyus; Korean War; UN Defensive; UN Offensive; CCF Intervention; First UN Counteroffensive; Third Battle of Seoul; Operation Golden Pheasant; Operation Just Cause; War on terror; Afghanistan
- Website: Official Website

Commanders
- Current commander: MG Bernard J. Harrington
- Notable commanders: Full list of commanders

Insignia
- Distinctive unit insignia

- Shoulder sleeve insignia
NATO Map Symbol
7
I

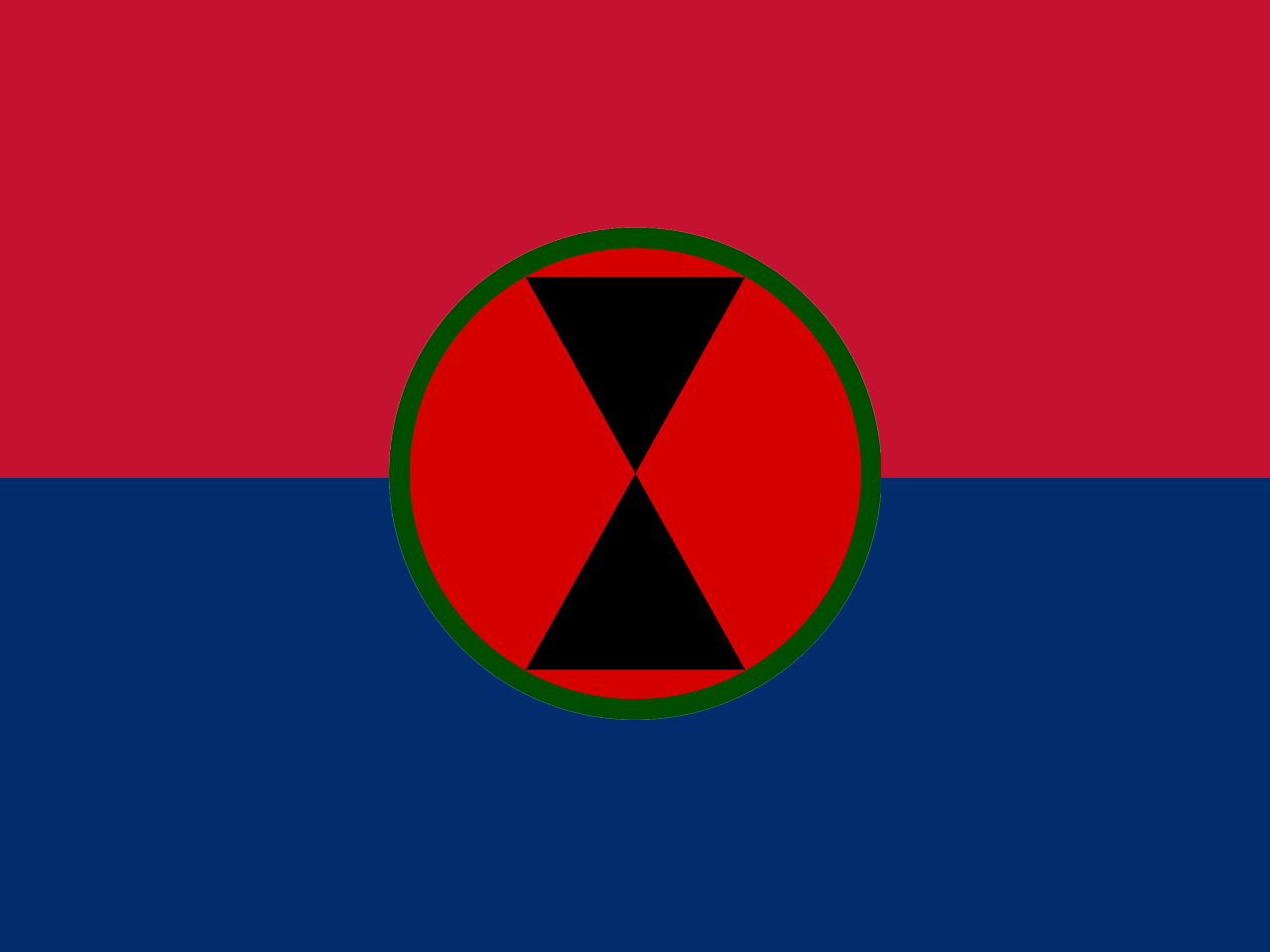
- Flag of the United States Army 7th Infantry Division

The 7th Infantry Division (Multi-Domain Command–Pacific) is an active duty division of the United States Army based at Joint Base Lewis-McChord, Washington. It is charged with maintaining the capability of two Stryker infantry brigade combat teams, a combat aviation brigade, and a Division Artillery Unit, as well as preparing units for several U.S. Army Pacific yearly exercises. The 7th Infantry Division is the only active-duty multi-component division headquarters in the Army. Major General Bernard J. Harrington commands the division. The division also supervises the former components of the 1st Multi-Domain Task Force and an Intelligence, Information, Cyber, Electronic Warfare and Space Capabilities, or I2CEWS battalion. The division was subsequently reassigned from First Corps to the United States Army Pacific as a Direct Reporting Unit

The division was first activated in December 1917, towards the end of World War I. It has been based at Fort Ord, California for most of its history. Although elements of the division saw brief active service in World War I, it is best known for its participation in the Pacific Ocean theater of World War II where it took heavy casualties engaging the Imperial Japanese Army in the Aleutian Islands, Leyte, and Okinawa. Following the Japanese surrender in 1945, the division was stationed in Japan and Korea, and with the outbreak of the Korean War in 1950 was one of the first units in action. It took part in the Inchon Landings and the advance north until Chinese forces counter-attacked and almost overwhelmed the scattered division. The 7th later went on to fight in the Battle of Pork Chop Hill and the Battle of Old Baldy.

After the Korean War ended, the division was headquartered at Camp Casey with artillery units supporting the 1st Cavalry Division just south of the Korean Demilitarized Zone until the mid-1960s. In the late 1980s, it briefly saw action overseas in Operation Golden Pheasant in Honduras and Operation Just Cause in Panama. In the early 1990s, it provided domestic support to the civil authorities in Operation Green Sweep and during the 1992 Los Angeles Riots. In 1994 the division was inactivated with a few units transferring to Fort Lewis, and Fort Ord closing. In June 1999 the 7th was reactivated at Fort Carson, Colorado and comprised three National Guard brigades. The 1st Battalion, 162d Infantry of the Oregon Army National Guard was attached to the 7th Infantry Division and deployed for Operation Iraqi Freedom from 2003 to 2004. The division's final role was as a training and evaluation unit for Army National Guard brigades, which it undertook until its inactivation in 2006.

On 26 April 2012, the Department of Defense announced the reactivation of the 7th Infantry Division headquarters supporting the mission of I Corps.

On 18 June 2026, the 7th Infantry Division was redesignated as the 7th Infantry (Multi-Domain Command - Pacific),merging the former 1st Multi-Domain Task Force with the 7th Infantry Division.

== History ==
=== World War I ===
==== Activation ====
The War Department ordered the formation of the 7th Division on 6 December 1917 at Camp Wheeler, near Macon, Georgia. The nucleus of the division was formed by Regular Army units stationed at Camp Wheeler (8th Field Artillery), Camp Greenleaf (22nd, 34th, 35th, and 36th Ambulance Companies and Field Hospitals), and Chickamauga Park (55th and 56th Infantry and 80th Field Artillery), Georgia, Fort Bliss (34th and 64th Infantry), Camp Logan (79th Field Artillery), and Fort Sam Houston (5th Engineer Regiment), Texas, Fort Sill, Oklahoma (8th Field Artillery), and Camp Vail, Vermont (10th Field Signal Battalion). Regular Army officers and graduates of the First and Second Officers' Training Camps formed the commissioned personnel of the unit, and Brigadier General Charles H. Barth assumed command on 1 January 1918. Systematic training began in the spring and was continued through the summer despite many transfers. In May and June 1918, 20,000 new men joined the division from Camp Wheeler, Camp Travis, Texas, and Columbus Barracks, Ohio, the majority hailing from Illinois, Iowa, Michigan, Missouri, and Pennsylvania.

On 18 July 1918, the division moved to ports of embarkation as it prepared to deploy to Europe as a part of the American Expeditionary Forces (AEF). The unit arrived at Hoboken, New Jersey and in New York, via Camp Merritt, where additional replacements joined the unit. The majority of the unit sailed to Brest, France. The 7th Supply Train and the 7th Train Headquarters and Military Police sailed for Bordeaux, France. The units began to arrive in France on 26 July with the last units arriving on 3 September 1918. Most of the division sailed to Europe aboard the SS Leviathan.

==== Training in France ====
From the period of 17 August to 9 October, the division conducted final training and preparation to enter the line in the Ancy-le-Franc Training Area. Some soldiers from the unit were sent to the 4th and 26th Divisions as replacements for losses. From the period of 2 September through the 14th the unit was under the administrative control of the VI Corps.

==== Combat chronicle ====
While on the Western Front, the 7th Division did not see action at full divisional strength, though its infantry and reconnaissance elements did engage German forces. On 11 October 1918, it first came under shell fire and later, at Saint-Mihiel, came under chemical attack. Elements of the 7th probed up toward Prény near the Moselle River, capturing positions and driving German forces out of the region. It was at this time that the division first received its shoulder sleeve insignia.

From the period of 10 October until the end of the war on 11 November, the division, minus their artillery occupied and conducted local engagements in the Puvenelle Sector (Lorraine). On 10 October 1918, the division relieved the 90th Division on the front with a front line from Sablière, Vandières (incl), Côte 327, north edge of Bois des Rappes, la Souleuvre Fme, 1½ km south of Rembercourt-sur-Mad. The 92nd Division was on the right and the 37th Division was on the left. On 16 October, the 28th Division moved in on the left of the 7th Division. Several days later, on 23 October, the 92nd Division (VI Corps) occupied the sector on the. Three days later on 26 October the sector was reduced by moving the east boundary to a line between Villers-sous-Prény and Prény (both incl). Elements of the 92nd Division relieved the 56th Infantry Regiment. On 29 October, the sector was extended west to a line from Xammes to Charey, with the 64th Infantry relieving elements of the 28th Division, on a front along the eastern edge of Bois de Blainchamp, northern edge of Bois de Hailbat, eastern edge of Bois du Rupt, northern edge of Bois de la Montagne.

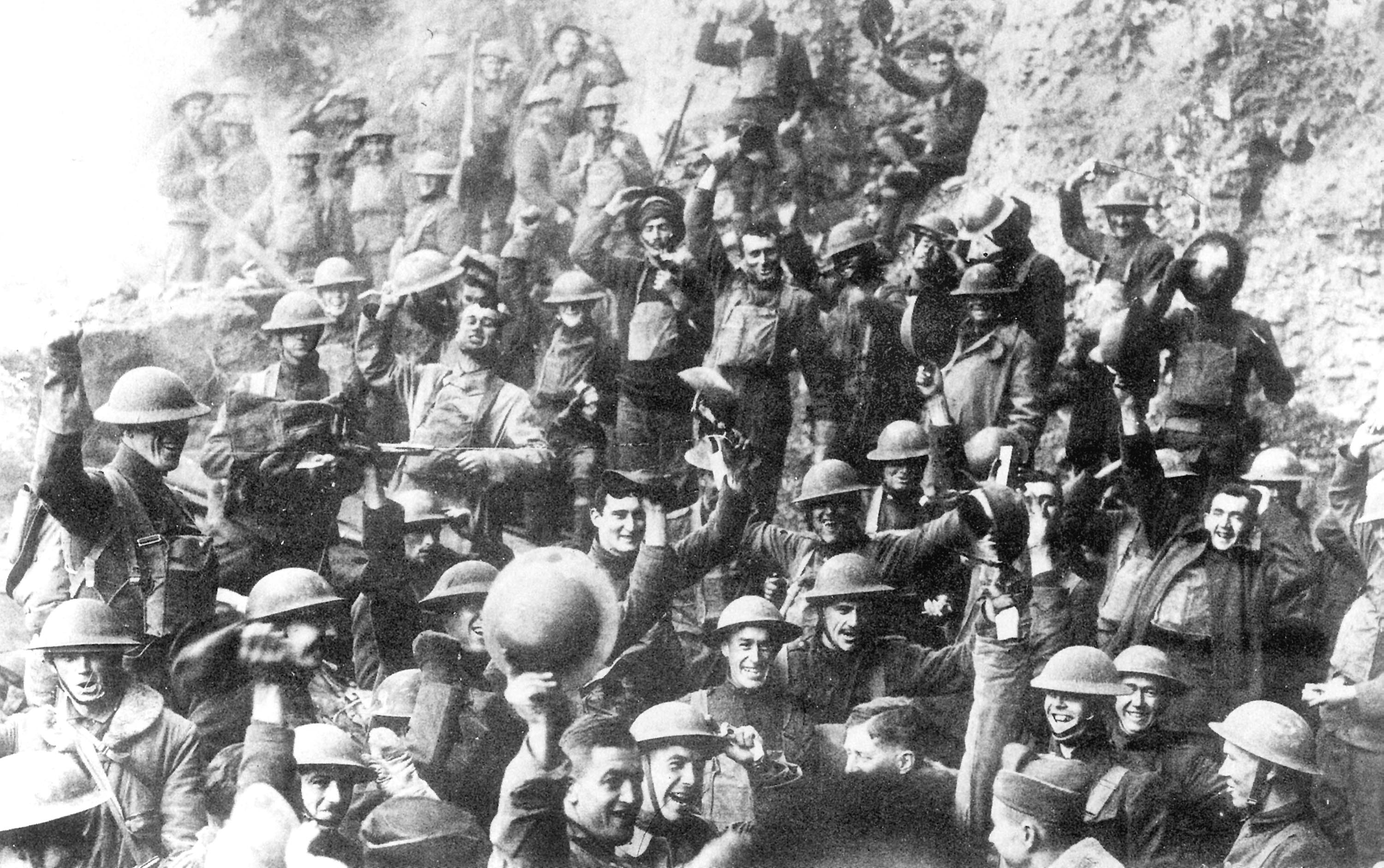
Doughboys of the 64th Infantry Regiment, 7th Division, celebrate the news of the Armistice with Germany, November 11, 1918.

During this period in early November, the 7th Division began preparing for an assault on the Hindenburg Line as part of the Second Army. The division launched a reconnaissance in force on the Voëvre plain, but the main assault was never conducted as hostilities ended on 11 November 1918 with the signing of the Armistice with Germany.

On 1 November the division conducted local attacks and established outposts at Bois de Trou-de-la-Haie and Bois de Grand-Fontaine. From 9 November through 11th the division executes local attacks and makes gains along the front. On 9 November the division assumes temporary occupation of a hill west of Prény. On 10 November, Hill 323 (1 km southeast of Rembercourt) is occupied. On 11 November, the line is established from 310.2 to 287.1 in the Bois de Grand-Fontaine, the quarry near 278.7, west of Rembercourt, and the small woods ¼ km south of Mon Plaisir Fme.

During its 33 days on the front line, the 7th Division suffered 1,709 casualties, including 204 killed in action and 1,505 wounded in action and was awarded a campaign streamer for Lorraine. The division then served on occupation duties as it began preparations to return to the United States.

==== Order of battle ====
7th Division commanders during World War I included Brigadier General Charles H. Barth and Major General Edmund Wittenmyer. The following lists shows the order of battle, units that contributed personnel to form the nucleus of units, and the unit activation dates and locations.

Headquarters, 7th Division

- 13th Infantry Brigade (formed 18 December 1917 at Chickamauga Park)
  - 55th Infantry Regiment (formed from personnel of the 17th Infantry at Chickamauga Park, 1917)
  - 56th Infantry Regiment (formed from personnel of the 17th Infantry at Chickamauga Park, 1917)
  - 20th Machine Gun Battalion
- 14th Infantry Brigade (formed 20 December 1917 at Camp Bliss)
  - 34th Infantry Regiment (formed from personnel of the 7th, 20th, and 23rd Infantry Regiments in at Camp Baker, near El Paso, Texas)
  - 64th Infantry Regiment (formed from personnel of the 34th Infantry in 1917 at Camp Baker)
  - 21st Machine Gun Battalion
- 7th Field Artillery Brigade (formed at Camp Wheeler on 8 January 1918)
  - 8th Field Artillery Regiment (155mm) (formed from personnel of the 5th and 6th Field Artillery Regiments at Camp Wheeler and Fort Sill)
  - 79th Field Artillery Regiment (75mm) (formed at Camp Logan)
  - 80th Field Artillery Regiment (75mm) (formed at Chickamauga Park)
  - 7th Trench Mortar Battery
- 19th Machine Gun Battalion
- 5th Engineer Regiment
- 10th Field Signal Battalion
- Headquarters Troop, 7th Division
- 7th Train Headquarters and Military Police
  - 7th Ammunition Train
  - 7th Engineer Train
  - 7th Supply Train
  - 7th Sanitary Train
    - 22nd, 34th, 35th, 36th Ambulance Companies and Field Hospitals

=== Interwar period ===
The 7th Division arrived at Camp Mills, New York, 20 June 1919, after completing 6 months of training at the Colombey-les-Belles Training Area in France. On arrival, emergency period personnel were discharged from the service at Camp Mills. The division proceeded to Camp Funston, Fort Riley, Kansas, arrived 29 June, and remained there until July 1920. The division was transferred to Camp George G. Meade, Maryland, in July 1920 for permanent station. As a part of the War Department's decision to maintain only three fully-active stateside infantry divisions, the 7th Division was inactivated, less the 14th Infantry Brigade and several smaller units, on 22 September 1921 at Camp Meade. Concurrently, the inactivated units were assigned active associate units for mobilization purposes. The 7th Division was allotted to the Seventh Corps Area for mobilization responsibility and assigned to the VII Corps. Fort Snelling, Minnesota, was designated as the mobilization and training station for the division upon reactivation. During the period 1921–39, the 7th Division was represented by the 14th Infantry Brigade and other assorted active elements that formed the base force from which the division would be reactivated in the event of war. Additionally, most of the inactive elements were organized by mid-1927 as "Regular Army Inactive" (RAI) units with Organized Reserve personnel.

The active elements of the division maintained habitual training relationships with divisional RAI units, as well as with those of the VII Corps, XVII Corps, and the 88th, 89th, and 102nd Divisions. The RAI and Reserve units often trained with the active elements of the division during summer training camps usually conducted at Forts Riley and Leavenworth, Kansas, Fort Crook, Nebraska, or Fort Snelling. The 3rd and 17th Infantry Regiments also supported the Reserve units’ conduct of the Citizens' Military Training Camps held at Fort Leavenworth and Fort Des Moines, Iowa. The 14th Infantry Brigade, reinforced by the active elements of the 7th Tank Company, 9th and 14th Field Artillery Regiments, and 7th Quartermaster Regiment, held maneuvers in those years when funds were available, at Fort Riley or Camp Ripley, Minnesota. During these maneuvers, the 7th Division was occasionally formed in a provisional status to exercise division-level command and control procedures. The division headquarters was also provisionally formed on 21 July 1937 for the August 1937 Fourth Army maneuvers at Camp Ripley. For that maneuver, the division (14th Infantry Brigade as the nucleus) was reinforced by the Minnesota National Guard’s 92nd Infantry Brigade, in addition to the other active divisional elements.

=== World War II ===
==== Reactivation ====
On 1 July 1940, the 7th Division was formally reactivated at Camp Ord, California, under the command of Major General Joseph W. Stilwell. As the Regular Army was still seriously understrength, most of the early troops in the division were conscripted as a part of the United States' first peacetime military draft. Between 20 January and 3 February 1941, the division received 5,825 new men; 95 to the Headquarters and Military Police Company, 24 to the 7th Reconnaissance Troop, 26 to the 7th Signal Company, 1,562 to the 17th Infantry Regiment, 1,559 to the 32nd Infantry Regiment, 1,137 to the 53rd Infantry Regiment, 837 to the division artillery, 300 to the 13th Engineer Battalion, and 105 to the 17th Medical Battalion. Most of the draftees were from the West Coast, but there were also a substantial contingent from the Midwestern United States, particularly Illinois and Minnesota.

==== Division organization ====
The 7th Infantry Division consisted of the following units.

7th Infantry Division organization (click to enlarge)

- 7th Infantry Division
  - 7th Infantry Division Headquarters
  - 7th Cavalry Reconnaissance Troop (Mechanized) (M3 scout cars and then M8 Greyhound armored cars)
  - 17th Infantry Regiment
    - Headquarters and Headquarters Company
    - 3× Infantry battalions
      - each battalion consists of: 1× Headquarters and Headquarters Company, 3× Rifle companies, 1× Heavy Weapons Company
    - Cannon Company (T12 Gun Motor Carriages and T19 Howitzer Motor Carriages, later replaced by either M3 105mm towed howitzers or M7 Priest self propelled howitzers)
    - Anti-Tank Company (M3 37mm anti-tank guns, which were replaced by 1944 with M1 57mm anti-tank guns)
    - Service Company
  - 32nd Infantry Regiment
    - same organization as 17th Infantry Regiment
  - 53rd Infantry Regiment (relieved from assignment to the division in 1941 and replaced by the 159th Infantry Regiment)
    - same organization as 17th Infantry Regiment
  - 159th Infantry Regiment (California Army National Guard; assigned to the division on 29 September 1941; relieved from assignment to the division on 23 August 1943)
    - same organization as 17th Infantry Regiment
  - 184th Infantry Regiment (California Army National Guard; assigned to the division on 23 August 1943)
    - same organization as 17th Infantry Regiment
  - 7th Infantry Division Artillery
    - Headquarters and Headquarters Battery
    - 31st Field Artillery Battalion
      - Headquarters and Headquarters Battery
      - 3× Batteries (M1 155mm towed howitzers)
      - Service Battery
    - 48th Field Artillery Battalion
      - Headquarters and Headquarters Battery
      - 3× Batteries (M2 105mm towed howitzers)
      - Service Battery
    - 49th Field Artillery Battalion
      - same organization as 48th Field Artillery Battalion
    - 57th Field Artillery Battalion
      - same organization as 48th Field Artillery Battalion
  - Headquarters Special Troops
    - Headquarters Company, 7th Infantry Division
    - 7th Signal Company
    - 7th Quartermaster Company
    - 707th Ordnance Light Maintenance Company
    - 7th Military Police Platoon
    - 7th Infantry Division Band (attached)
  - 13th Engineer Combat Battalion
    - Headquarters and Headquarters and Service Company
    - 3× Engineer combat companies
  - 7th Medical Battalion
    - Headquarters and Headquarters Detachment
    - 3× Collecting companies
    - Clearing Company

==== Training ====
The 7th Division was assigned to III Corps of the Fourth United States Army, and transferred to Longview, Washington, in August 1941 to participate in tactical maneuvers. Following this training, the division moved back to Fort Ord, California, where it was located when the Japanese attack of Pearl Harbor caused the United States to declare war. The formation proceeded almost immediately to San Jose, California, arriving 11 December 1941 to help protect the west coast and allay civilian fears of invasion. The 53rd Infantry Regiment was relieved of assignment to the 7th Division and replaced with the 159th Infantry Regiment, newly deployed from the California Army National Guard. For the early parts of the war, the division participated mainly in construction and training roles. Subordinate units also practiced boat loading at the Monterey Wharf and amphibious assault techniques at the Salinas River in California.

On 9 April 1942, the division was formally redesignated as the 7th Motorized Division and transferred to Camp San Luis Obispo on 24 April 1942. Four months later, part of the 7th moved to Goffs, CA (TDY) for divisional training in preparation for its planned deployment to the African theater. Other units went to the Quartermaster depot at Freda, CA or to a railroad siding at Java, CA. On 10 October 1942, they moved back to Camp San Luis Obispo, both on train and by vehicle convoy. It was again designated the 7th Infantry Division on 1 January 1943, when the motorized equipment was removed from the unit and it became a light infantry division once more, as the Army eliminated the motorized division concept fearing it would be logistically difficult and that the troops were no longer needed in North Africa. The 7th Infantry Division began rigorous amphibious assault training under US Marines from the Fleet Marine Force, before being deployed to fight in the Pacific theater instead of Africa. USMC General Holland Smith oversaw the unit's training.

==== Combat chronicle ====
===== Aleutian Islands =====
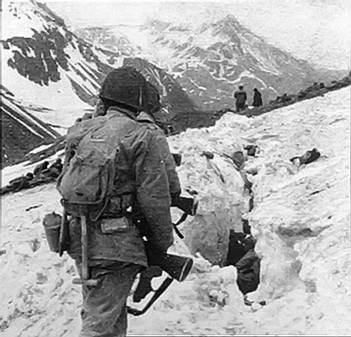
7th Infantry Division troops navgiate snow and ice during the battle on Attu in May 1943.

Elements of the 7th Infantry Division first saw combat in the amphibious assault on Attu Island, the westernmost Japanese entrenchment in the Aleutian Islands chain of Alaska. Elements landed on 11 May 1943, spearheaded by the 17th Infantry Regiment. The initial landings were unopposed, but Japanese forces mounted a counteroffensive the next day, and the 7th Infantry Division fought an intense battle over the tundra against strong Japanese resistance. The division was hampered by its inexperience, lack of winter clothing, and poor weather and terrain conditions, but was eventually able to coordinate an effective attack. The fight for the island culminated in a battle at Chichagof Harbor, when the division destroyed all Japanese resistance on the island on 29 May, after a suicidal Japanese bayonet charge. During its first fight of the war, 549 soldiers of the division were killed, while killing 2,351 Japanese and taking 28 prisoners. After American forces secured the island chain, the 159th Infantry Regiment was ordered to stay, and the 184th Infantry Regiment took its place as the 7th Division's third infantry regiment. The 184th Infantry remained with the division until the end of the war. The 159th Infantry Regiment stayed on the island for some time longer until returning to the Lower 48. The 159th Infantry Regiment was then subsequently sent to Europe, in early 1945 and assigned to the 106th Infantry Division.

American forces then began preparing to move against nearby Kiska island, termed Operation Cottage, the final fight in the Aleutian Islands Campaign. In August 1943, elements of the 7th Infantry Division took part in an amphibious assault on Kiska with a brigade from the 6th Canadian Infantry Division, only to find the island deserted by the Japanese. It was later discovered that the Japanese had withdrawn their 5,000-soldier garrison during the night of 28 July, under cover of fog.

===== Marshall Islands =====
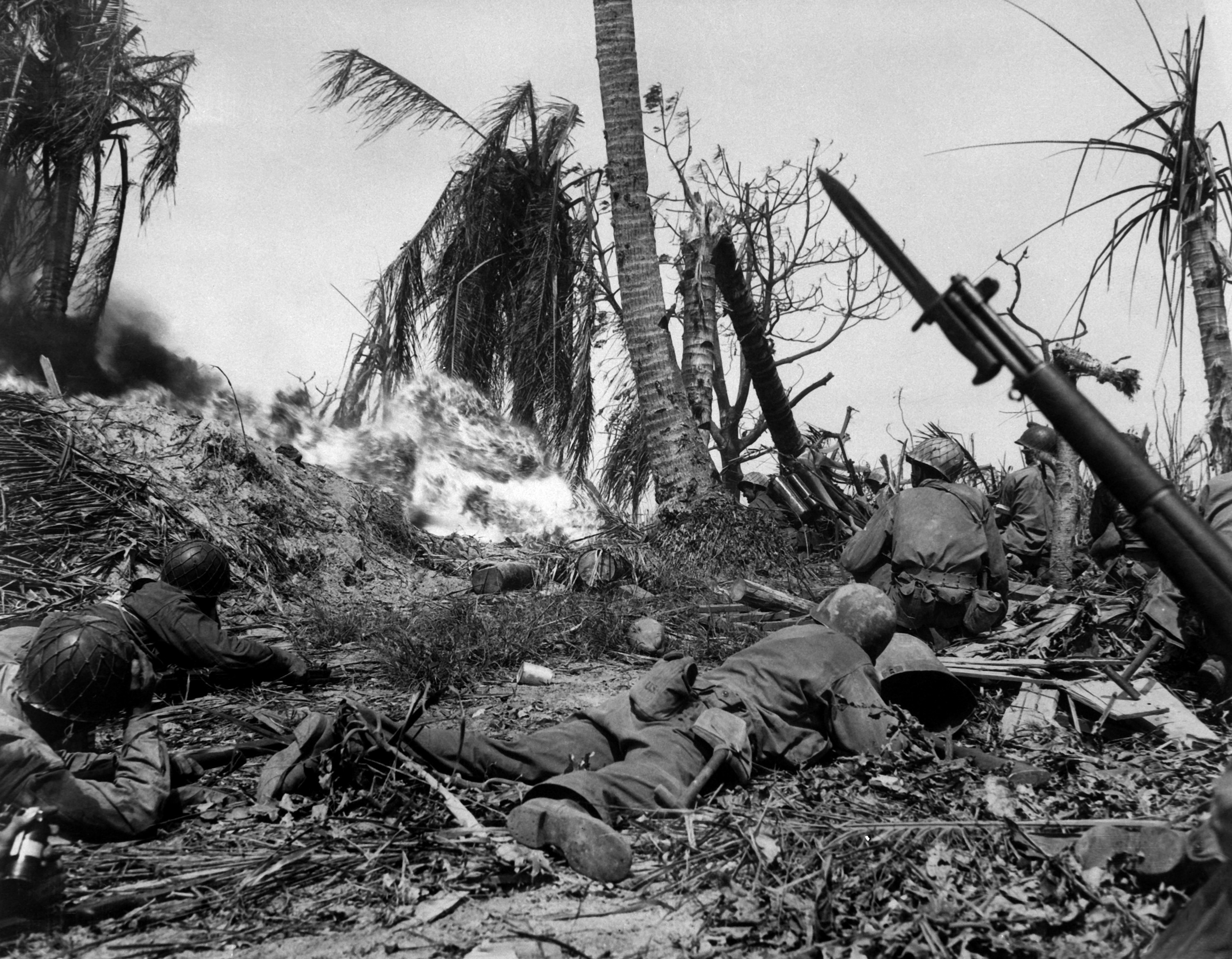
7th Infantry Division soldiers attack a blockhouse during the Battle of Kwajalein.

After the campaign, the division moved to Hawaii where it trained in new amphibious assault techniques on the island of Maui, before returning to Schofield Barracks on Oahu for brief leave. It was reassigned to V Amphibious Corps, a US Marine Corps command. The division left Pearl Harbor on 22 January 1944, for an offensive on Japanese territory. On 30 January 1944, the division landed on islands in the Kwajalein Atoll in conjunction with the 4th Marine Division, code named Operation Flintlock. The 7th Division landed on the namesake island while the 4th Marine Division forces struck the outlying islands of Roi and Namur. The division made landfall on the western beaches of the island at 09:30 on 1 February. It advanced halfway through the island by nightfall the next day, and reached the eastern shore at 1335 hours on 4 February, having wrested the island from the Japanese. The victory put V Amphibious Corps in control of all 47 islands in the atoll. The 7th Infantry Division suffered 176 killed and 767 wounded. On 7 February, the division departed the atoll and returned to Schofield Barracks.

Elements took part in the capture of Engebi in the Eniwetok Atoll on 18 February 1944, code named Operation Catchpole. Because of the speed and success of the attack on Kwajalein, the attack was undertaken several months ahead of schedule. After a week of fighting, the division secured the islands of the atoll. The division then returned to Hawaii to continue training. There, in June 1944, General Douglas MacArthur and President Franklin Roosevelt personally reviewed the division.

===== Leyte =====
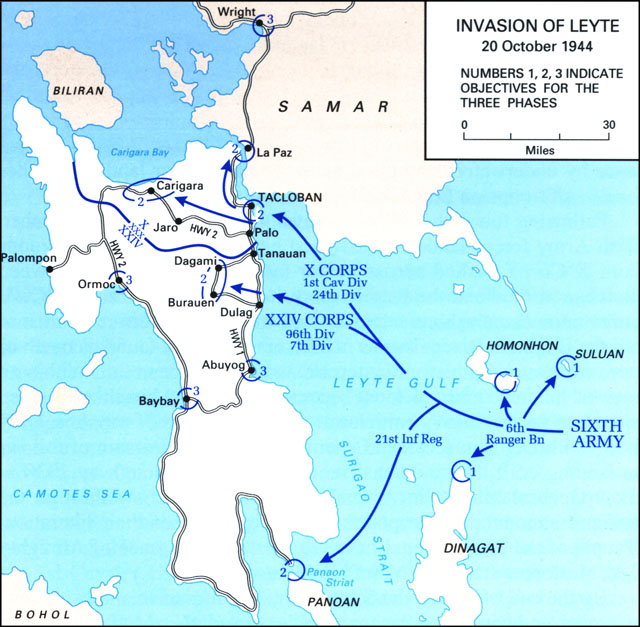
Invasion of Leyte Map, October 1944.

The 7th Infantry Division left Hawaii on 11 October, heading for Leyte and included the Filipino troops of the Philippine Commonwealth Army and Philippine Constabulary. At this time it was under the command of XXIV Corps of the Sixth United States Army. On 20 October 1944, the division made an assault landing at Dulag, Leyte, initially only encountering light resistance. Following a defeat at sea on 26 October, the Japanese launched a large, uncoordinated counteroffensive on the Sixth Army. After heavy fighting, the 184th Infantry secured airstrips at Dulag, while the 17th Infantry secured San Pablo, and the 32nd Infantry took Buri. The 17th Infantry troops moved north to take Dagami on 29 October, in intense jungle warfare that produced high casualties. The division then shifted to the west coast of Leyte on 25 November and attacked north toward Ormoc, securing Valencia on 25 December. An amphibious landing by the 77th Infantry Division effected the capture of Ormoc on 31 December 1944. The 7th Infantry Division joined in the occupation of the city, and engaged the 26th Japanese Infantry Division, which had been holding up the advance of the 11th Airborne Division. The 7th Division's attack was successful in allowing the 11th Airborne Division to move through, however, Japanese forces proved difficult to drive out of the area. As such, operations to secure Leyte continued until early February 1945. Afterward, the division began training for an invasion of the Ryukyu island chain throughout March 1945. It was relieved from the Sixth Army and the Philippine Commonwealth military, which went on to attack Luzon.

===== Okinawa =====
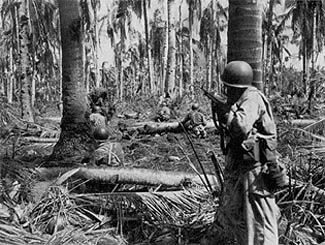
Soldiers from the 184th Infantry advance on a machine gun nest during the Battle of Leyte.

The division was reassigned to XXIV Corps, Tenth United States Army, a newly formed command, and began preparations for the assault on Okinawa. The Battle of Okinawa began on 1 April 1945, L-Day, when the 7th Infantry Division participated in an assault landing south of Hagushi, Okinawa alongside the 96th Infantry Division, and the 1st, and 6th Marine Divisions. of III Amphibious Corps. These divisions spearheaded an assault that would eventually land 250,000 men ashore. The 7th Division quickly moved to Kadena, taking its airfield, and drove from the west to the east coast of the island on the first day. The division then moved south, encountering stiff resistance from fortifications at Shuri a few days later. The Japanese had moved 90 tanks, much of their artillery, and heavy weapons away from the beaches and into this region. Eventually, XXIV Corps destroyed the defenses after a 51-day battle in the hills of southern Okinawa, which was complicated by harsh weather and terrain. During the operation, the division was bombarded with tens of thousands of rounds of field artillery fire, encountering Japanese armed with spears as it continued its fight across the island. Japanese also fought using irregular warfare techniques, relying on hidden cave systems, snipers, and small-unit ambushes to delay the advancing 7th Infantry Division. After the fight, the division began capturing large numbers of Japanese prisoners for the first time in the war, due to low morale, high casualties, and poor equipment. It fought for five continuous days to secure areas around the Nakagusuku Wan and Skyline Ridge. The division also secured Hill 178 in the fighting. It then moved to Kochi Ridge, securing it after a two-week battle. After 39 days of continuous fighting, the 7th Infantry Division was sent into reserve, having suffered heavy casualties.

Men of Co. B, 184th Inf. Regt., inspect a Japanese 75-mm gun they captured on Okinawa. 29 May 1945.

Map of the Okinawa invasion.

After the 96th Infantry Division secured Conical Hill, the 7th Infantry Division returned to the line. It pushed into positions on the southern Ozato Mura hills, where Japanese resistance was heaviest. It was placed on the extreme left flank of the Tenth Army, taking the Ghinen peninsula, Sashiki, and Hanagusuku, fending off a series of Japanese counterattacks. Despite heavy Japanese resistance and prolonged bad weather, the division continued its advance until 21 June 1945, when the battle ended, having seen 82 days of combat. The island and surrendering troops were secured by the next day. During the Battle of Okinawa, the soldiers of the 7th Infantry Division killed between 25,000 and 28,000 Japanese soldiers and took 4,584 prisoners. Balanced against this, the 7th Division suffered 2,340 killed and 6,872 wounded for a total of 9,212 battle casualties (Note: A 1959 US Army publication gave these numbers as 1,116 killed, and around 6,000 wounded, to make total casualties for World War II 8,135. (Army Almanac 1950, p. 524)) during 208 days of combat. The division was slated to participate in Operation Downfall as a part of XXIV Corps under the First United States Army, but these plans were scrapped after the Japanese surrendered following the use of nuclear weapons on Hiroshima and Nagasaki.

During World War II, soldiers of the 7th Infantry Division were awarded three Medals of Honor, 26 Distinguished Service Crosses, one Distinguished Service Medal, 982 Silver Star Medals, 33 Legion of Merit Medals, 50 Soldier's Medals, 3,853 Bronze Star Medals, and 178 Air Medals. The division received four campaign streamers and a Philippine Presidential Unit Citation during the war. The three Medals of Honor were awarded to Leonard C. Brostrom, John F. Thorson, and Joe P. Martinez.

==== Occupation of Japan ====
A few days after V-J Day, the division moved to Korea to accept the surrender of the Japanese Army in South Korea. After the war, the division served as an occupation force in Korea and Japan. Seven thousand, five hundred members of the unit returned to the United States, and the 184th Infantry Regiment was reassigned to the California Army National Guard, cutting the division to half its combat strength. To replace it, the 31st Infantry Regiment was assigned to the division. The 7th Infantry Division remained on occupation duty in Korea patrolling the 38th parallel until 1948, when it was reassigned to occupation duty in Japan, in charge of northern Honshū and all of Hokkaido. During this time, the US Army underwent a drastic reduction in size. At the end of World War II, it contained 89 divisions, but by 1950, the 7th Infantry Division was one of only 10 active divisions in the force. It was one of four understrength divisions on occupation duty in Japan alongside the 1st Cavalry Division, 24th Infantry Division, and 25th Infantry Division, all under control of the Eighth United States Army.

==== Casualties ====
World War II casualties

- Total battle casualties: 9,212
- Killed in action: 1,948
- Wounded in action: 7,258
- Missing in action: 4
- Prisoner of war: 2

=== Korean War ===
At the outbreak of the Korean War in June 1950, the 7th Infantry Division commander, Major General David G. Barr, assembled the division at Camp Fuji near Mount Fuji. The division was already depleted due to post-war shortages of men and equipment and further depleted as it sent large numbers of reinforcements to strengthen the 25th Infantry Division and 1st Cavalry Division, which were sent into combat in South Korea in July. The division was reduced to 9,000 men, half of its wartime strength. To replenish the ranks of the understrength division, the Republic of Korea Army (ROK) assigned over 8,600 Korean soldiers to the division. The Colombian Battalion was at times attached to the division. With the addition of priority reinforcements from the US, the division strength was eventually increased to 25,000 when it entered combat. Also fighting with the 7th Infantry Division for much of the war were members of the three successive Kagnew Battalions sent by Emperor Haile Selassie I of Ethiopia as part of the UN forces.

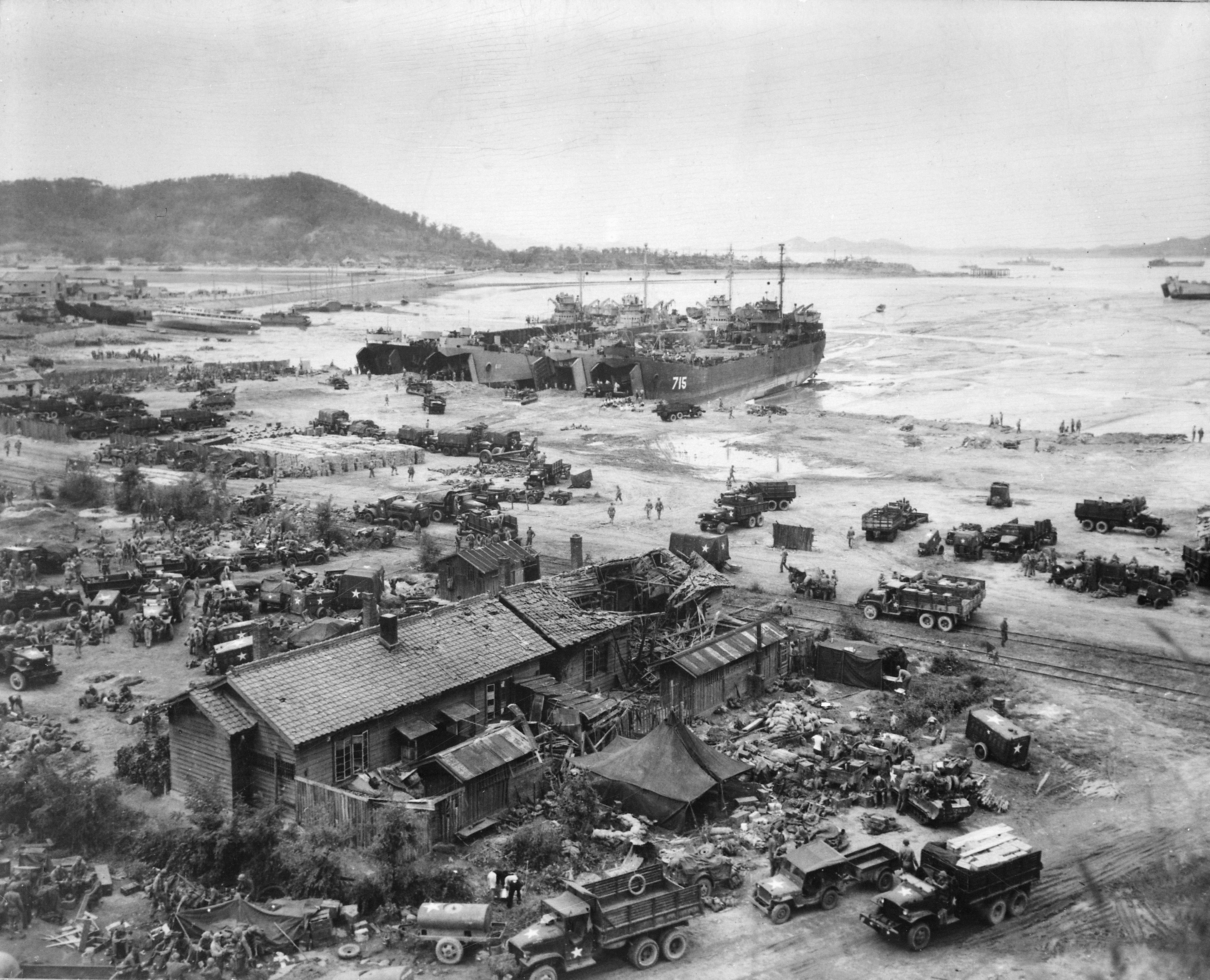
The Inchon Landings

The division paired with the 1st Marine Division under US X Corps to participate in the Inchon Landing, code named Operation Chromite. The two divisions would be supported by the US 3rd Infantry Division in reserve. Supported by 230 ships of the US Navy, X Corps began landing at Inchon on 15 September 1950, catching the Korean People's Army (KPA) by surprise. The 7th Infantry Division began landing on 18 September, after the 1st Marine Division, securing its right flank. X Corps quickly advanced to Seoul and the 1st Marine Division attacked the 20,000 defenders of the city from the north and southwest, while the 7th Infantry Division's 32nd Infantry Regiment attacked from the southeast. The 31st Infantry followed behind. Seoul fell to X Corps after suffering moderate casualties, particularly for the Marines. The division then began advancing south to cut off KPA supply routes. The 32nd Infantry crossed the Han River on 25 September to create a bridgehead, and the next day, the division advanced to Osan 30 miles (48 km) south of Seoul and linked up with the 1st Cavalry Division of Eighth United States Army which had broken out from the Pusan perimeter starting on 16 September and then began a general offensive northward against crumbling KPA opposition. Radio miscommunication and attack from nearby KPA forces caused a miscommunication, the soldiers of the 1st Cavalry and 7th Infantry briefly engaged in a small-arms firefight with one another, unable to communicate. Seoul was liberated one day later with the help of air assets from the 1st Cavalry Division. The combined forces of the Eighth Army cut off and captured retreating KPA forces. X Corps was kept separate from the rest of the Eighth Army to avoid placing a burden on the logistical system. As part of the UN offensive into North Korea 7th Division withdrew to Pusan to conduct another amphibious assault on the east coast of North Korea. The entire battle for Inchon and Seoul cost the division 106 killed, 411 wounded and 57 missing American soldiers, and 43 killed, 102 wounded South Korean soldiers. The Chinese People's Volunteer Army (PVA) entered the war on the side of North Korea, making their first attacks in late October.

The 7th Infantry Division began landing at Wonsan on 26 October, and Iwon on 29 October. The landing was delayed due to the presence of mines, and by the time X Corps came ashore, ROK forces moving overland had already occupied the ports. The division advanced to Hyesanjin, on the China–North Korea border by the Yalu River, one of the northernmost advances for UN soldiers of the war. Much of X Corps followed behind. On 21 November, the 17th Infantry reached the banks of the Yalu River. The advance went quickly for the 7th Infantry Division and ROK troops while the Marines were not able to advance as quickly. The division halted its advance until 24 November while other units of the Eighth Army's IX Corps and ROK II Corps caught up and supply lines were established. During this time, the 7th Division's regiments were spread out on the front line. The 31st Infantry Regiment remained at the Chosin Reservoir with the 1st Marine Division while the 32nd and 17th Infantry Regiments were much further to the northeast, closer to ROK I Corps. It was during this time that the division was served by a new type of unit, the 1st Mobile Army Surgical Hospital (M.A.S.H.).

==== Chinese intervention ====
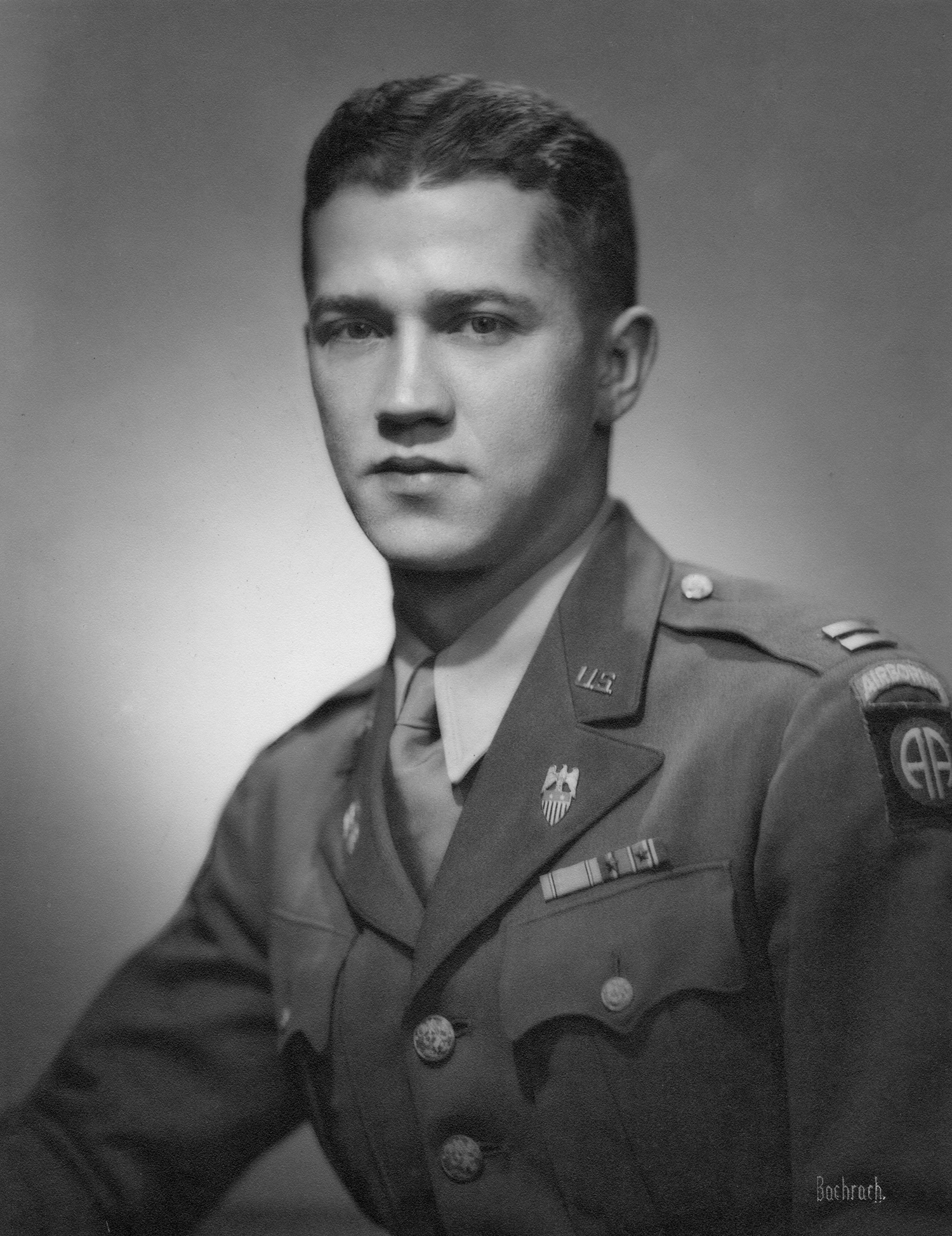
Lieutenant Colonel Don C. Faith Jr., leader of Task Force Faith

The UN forces renewed their offensive on 24 November before being stopped by the PVA Second Phase Offensive starting on 25 November with attacks on Eighth Army's IX Corps and ROK II Corps in the west and X Corps in the east. X Corps found itself under attack from the PVA 20th, 26th and 27th Field Armies, commanding a total of 12 divisions. During the furious action that followed, the 7th Infantry Division's spread out regiments were unable to resist the overwhelming PVA forces. Three of the division's infantry battalions were attacked from all sides the next day. 1st Battalion, 32nd Infantry (nicknamed Task Force Faith) was trapped with two other battalions by the PVA 80th and 81st Divisions from the 27th Field Army. In the subsequent Battle of Chosin Reservoir, the three battalions were destroyed by overwhelming PVA forces suffering over 2,000 casualties. The 31st Infantry suffered heavy casualties trying to fight back the PVA forces further north, but the 17th Infantry was spared of heavy attack, retreating along the Korean coastline, out of range of the offensive. By the time X Corps ordered a retreat, most of the 7th Infantry Division, save the 17th Infantry Regiment, had suffered 40 percent casualties. The scattered elements of the division saw repeated attacks as they attempted to withdrawal to the port of Hungnam in December 1950. These attacks cost the division another 100 killed before it was evacuated on 21 December. The division suffered 2,657 killed and 354 wounded during the retreat. Most of the dead were members of Task Force Faith.

The division returned to the front lines in early 1951, spearheaded by the 17th Infantry, which had suffered the fewest casualties from the PVA offensive. Division elements advanced through Tangyang in South Korea, and blocking PVA offensives from the northwest. The division reached full strength and saw action around Chechon, Chungju, and Pyeongchang as part of an effort to push the KPA and PVA forces back above the 38th Parallel and away from Seoul. The 7th Infantry Division engaged in a series of successful "limited objective" attacks in the early weeks of February, a series of small unit attacks and ambushes between the two sides. It would continue slowly advancing and clearing enemy hilltop positions through April. By April the entire Eighth Army was advancing north as one line stretching across the peninsula, reaching the 38th Parallel by May. The division, now assigned to IX Corps, then assaulted and fought a fierce three-day battle culminating with the recapture of the terrain that had been lost near the Hwachon Reservoir just over the 38th Parallel in North Korea. In capturing the town bordering on the reservoir it cut off thousands of PVA/KPA troops. The division fought on the front lines until June 1951 when it was assigned to the reserve for a brief rest and refitting.

==== Stalemate ====
When the division returned to the lines in October, after another assignment in reserve, it moved to the Heartbreak Ridge sector recently vacated by the 2nd Infantry Division, where it was supported by the 3rd Infantry Division and 1st Cavalry Division. During this new deployment the division fought in the Battle for Heartbreak Ridge, to take an area of staging grounds for the PVA/KPA armies. It remained static in the region until 23 February 1952 when it was sent into reserve and relieved by the 25th Infantry Division. The next year saw the 7th Division engaged in an extended campaign for nearby land, the Battle of Old Baldy. The 7th Division continued to defend "Line Missouri" through September 1952, though it became known as the "Static Line" as UN forces made few meaningful gains in the time.

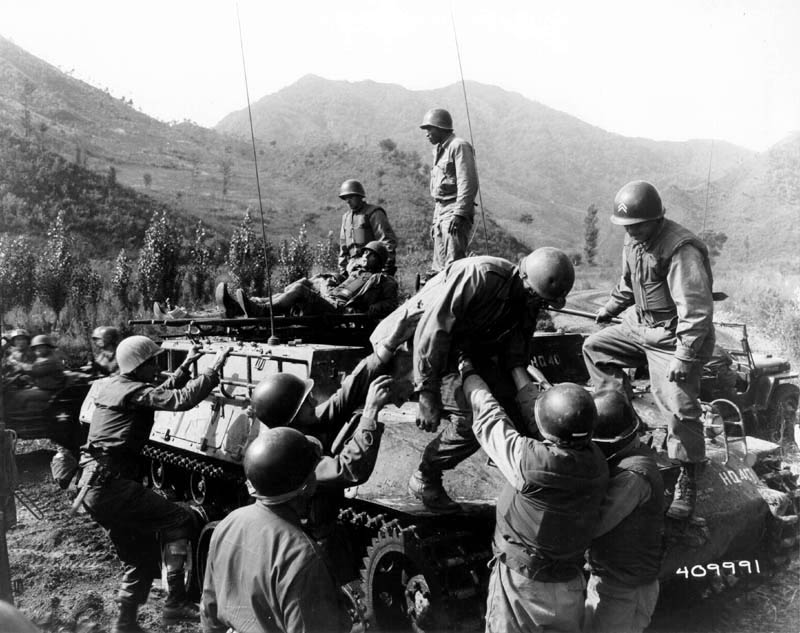
Corpsmen assist wounded from the 31st Regiment during the Battle of Triangle Hill.

The 7th Infantry Division's Operation Showdown launched in the early morning hours of 14 October 1952, with the 31st Infantry and 32nd Infantry at the head of the attack. The target of the assault was the Triangle Hill complex northeast of Kumhwa. The 7th Infantry Division remained in the Triangle Hill area until the end of October, when it was relieved by the 25th Infantry Division. The 7th Infantry Division was highly praised by commanders for its tenacity through the fight.

The division continued patrol activity around Old Baldy and Pork Chop Hill into 1953, digging tunnels and building a network of outposts and bunkers on and around the hill. In April, the KPA began stepping up offensive operations against UN forces. During the Battle of Porkchop Hill, the PVA 67th and 141st Divisions overran Pork Chop Hill using massed infantry and artillery fire. The hill had been under the control of the 31st Infantry. The 31st counterattacked with reinforcements from the 17th Infantry and recaptured the area the next day. On 6 July the PVA/KPA launched a determined attack against Pork Chop resulting in five days of fierce fighting with few meaningful results. By the end of July, five infantry battalions from the 31st and 17th were defending the hill, while a PVA division was in position to attack it. During this standoff, the UN ordered the 7th Infantry Division to retreat from the hill in preparation for an armistice, which would end major hostilities.

During the Korean War, the division saw a total of 850 days of combat, suffering 15,126 casualties, including 3,905 killed in action and 10,858 wounded. (Note: A 1997 division history from Turner Publishing Company gave this figure as 3,927 killed, 10,858 wounded for a total of 14,785 casualties in the Korean War. (Gardener & Stahura 1997, p. 77)) For the next few years, the division remained on defensive duty along the 38th parallel, under the command of the Eighth Army. Thirteen members of the division received the Medal of Honor for their actions during the Korean War: Charles H. Barker, Raymond Harvey, Einar H. Ingman Jr., William F. Lyell, Joseph C. Rodriguez, Richard Thomas Shea, Daniel D. Schoonover, Jack G. Hanson, Ralph E. Pomeroy, Edward R. Schowalter Jr., Benjamin F. Wilson, Don C. Faith Jr., and Anthony T. Kahoʻohanohano.

=== Cold War ===
From 1953 to 1971, the 7th Infantry Division defended the Korean Demilitarized Zone. Its main garrison was Camp Casey, South Korea. On 1 July 1963, the division was reorganized under the Reorganization Objective Army Division (ROAD) Table of Organization and Equipment. Three brigade headquarters were activated and Infantry units were reorganized into battalions. The division's former headquarters company grew into the 1st Brigade, 7th Infantry Division while the 13th Infantry Brigade was reactivated as the 2nd Brigade, 7th Infantry Division. The 14th Infantry Brigade was reactivated as the 3rd Brigade, 7th Infantry Division. In 1965 the division received its distinctive unit insignia, which alluded to its history during the Korean War.

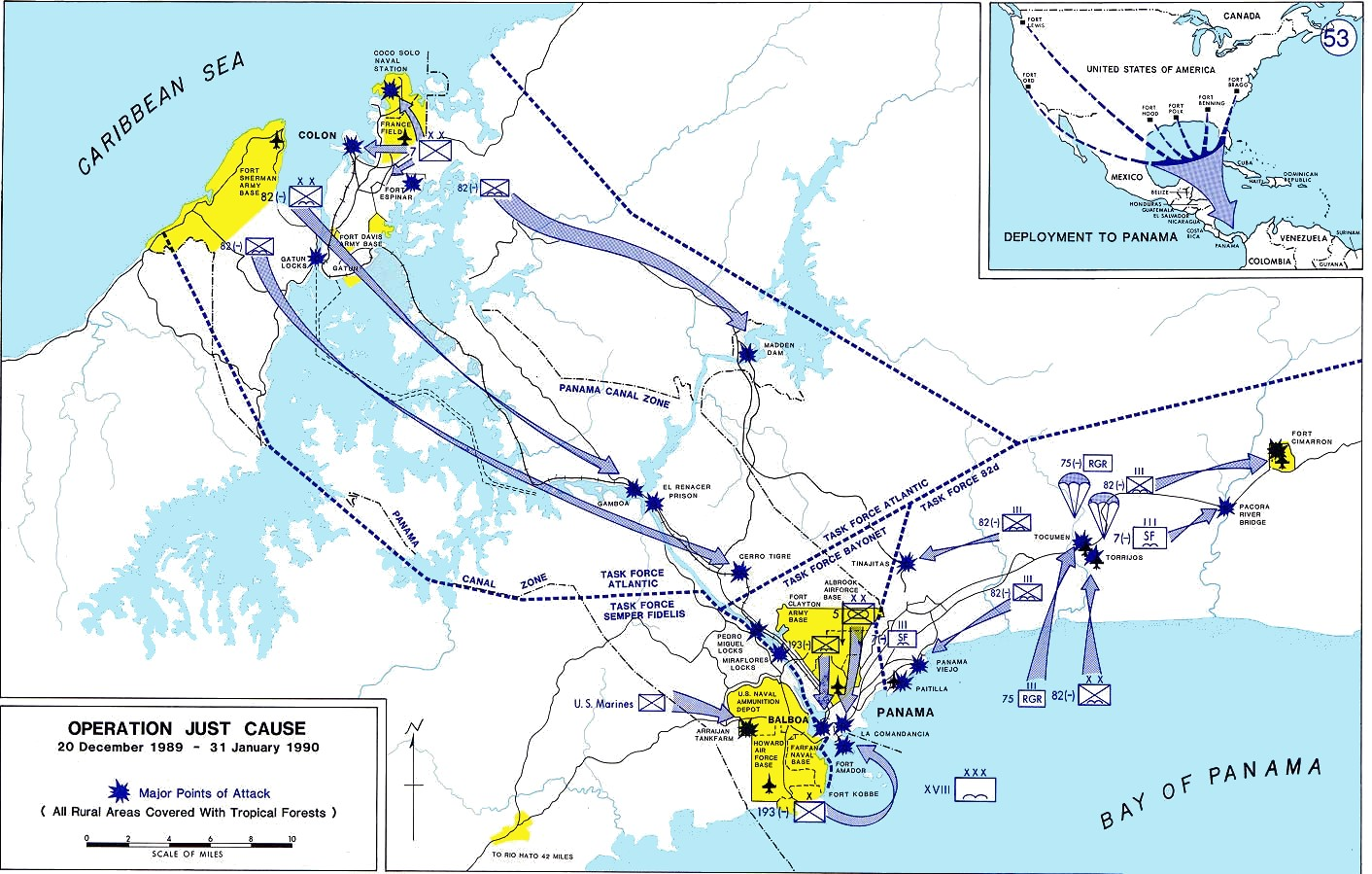
Tactical map of Operation Just Cause.

In October 1974 the 7th reactivated at its former garrison, Fort Ord. The unit did not see any action in Vietnam or during the post-war era, but was tasked to keep a close watch on South American developments. It trained at Fort Ord, Camp Roberts, Fort Hunter Liggett and Fort Irwin. On 1 October 1985 the division was redesignated as the 7th Infantry Division (Light), organized again as a light infantry division. It was the first US division specially designed as such. The various battalions of the 31st, and 32nd regiments moved from the division, replaced by battalions from other regiments, including battalions from the 21st Infantry Regiment, the 27th Infantry Regiment, and the 9th Infantry Regiment. The 9th and 27th Infantry Regiments participated in Operation Golden Pheasant in Honduras.

In 1989 the division took part in Operation Just Cause in Panama, briefly occupying the country in conjunction with the 82nd Airborne Division. Elements of the division landed in the northern areas of Colón Province, Panama, securing the Coco Solo Naval Station, Fort Espinar, France Field, and Colón while the 82nd Airborne and US Marines fought in the more heavily populated southern region. Once Panama City was under US control, the 82nd quickly re-deployed and left the city under the control of the 7th Division's 9th Infantry Regiment until after the capture of Manuel Noriega. It suffered four killed and three wounded in the operation.

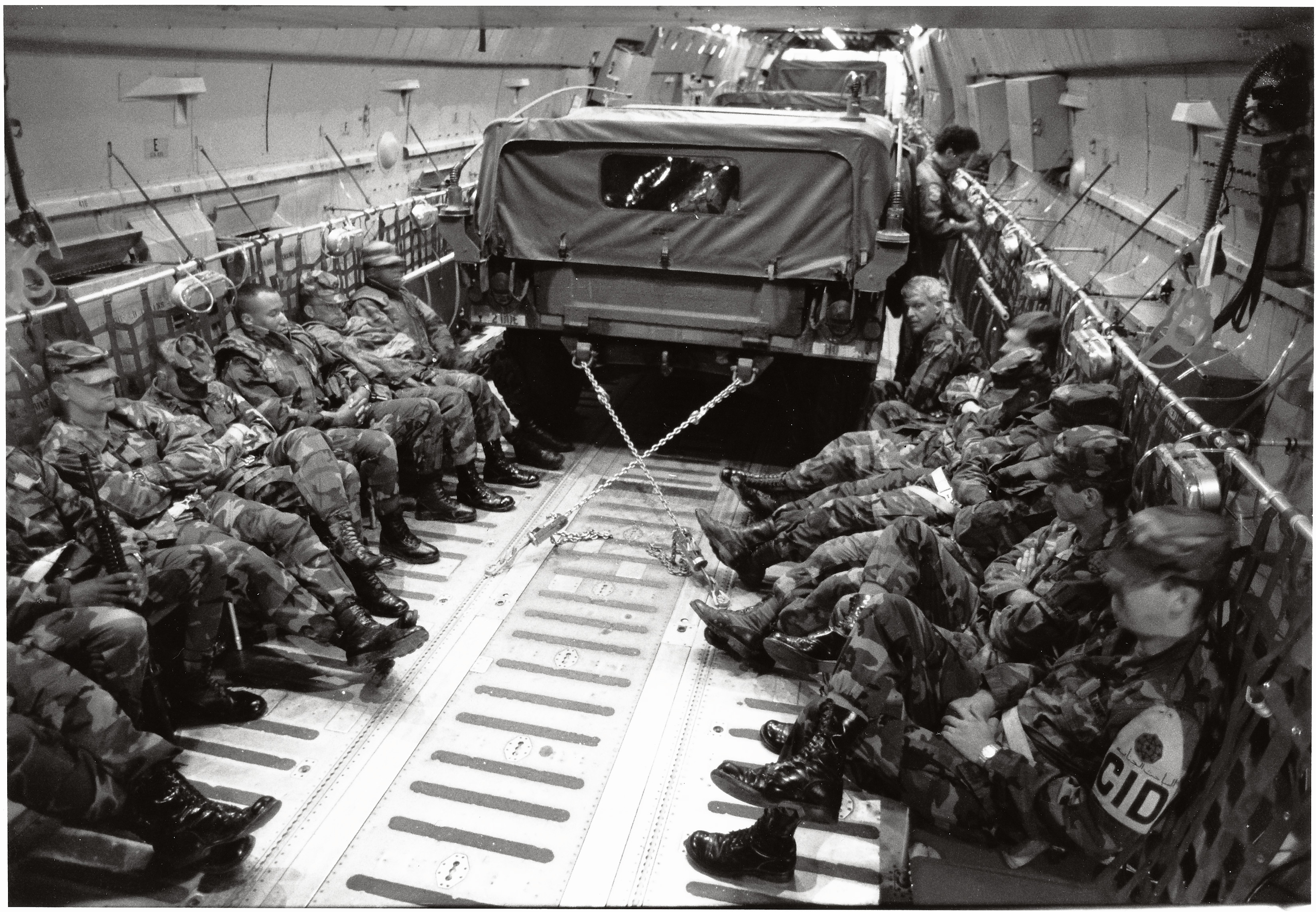
Soldiers of the 7th Infantry Division resting on board a C-141 while on their way to El Toro Air Station in preparation to combat the 1992 Los Angeles riots.

In 1991 the Base Realignment and Closure Commission recommended the closing of Fort Ord due to the escalating cost of living on the central California coastline. By 1994, Fort Ord closed and the 7th Infantry Division subsequently relocated to Fort Lewis, Washington. Elements of the division including the 2nd Brigade participated in one final mission in the United States before inactivation; quelling the 1992 Los Angeles riots, as part of Operation Garden Plot. The division's soldiers patrolled the streets of Los Angeles to act as crowd control and supported the Los Angeles Police Department and California Army National Guard in preventing the violence from rampaging throughout Los Angeles County. It was part of a force of 3,500 federal troops called into the city.

In 1993 the division was selected to be inactivated as part of the post-Cold War Army force reductions. The 1st Brigade relocated to Fort Lewis in 1993 and was reflagged on 15 August 1995 as the 1st Brigade, 25th Infantry Division; while the 2nd Brigade and the 3rd Brigade of the 7th was inactivated at Fort Ord. The division headquarters was formally inactivated on 16 June 1994 at Fort Lewis.

==== Units in 1989 ====
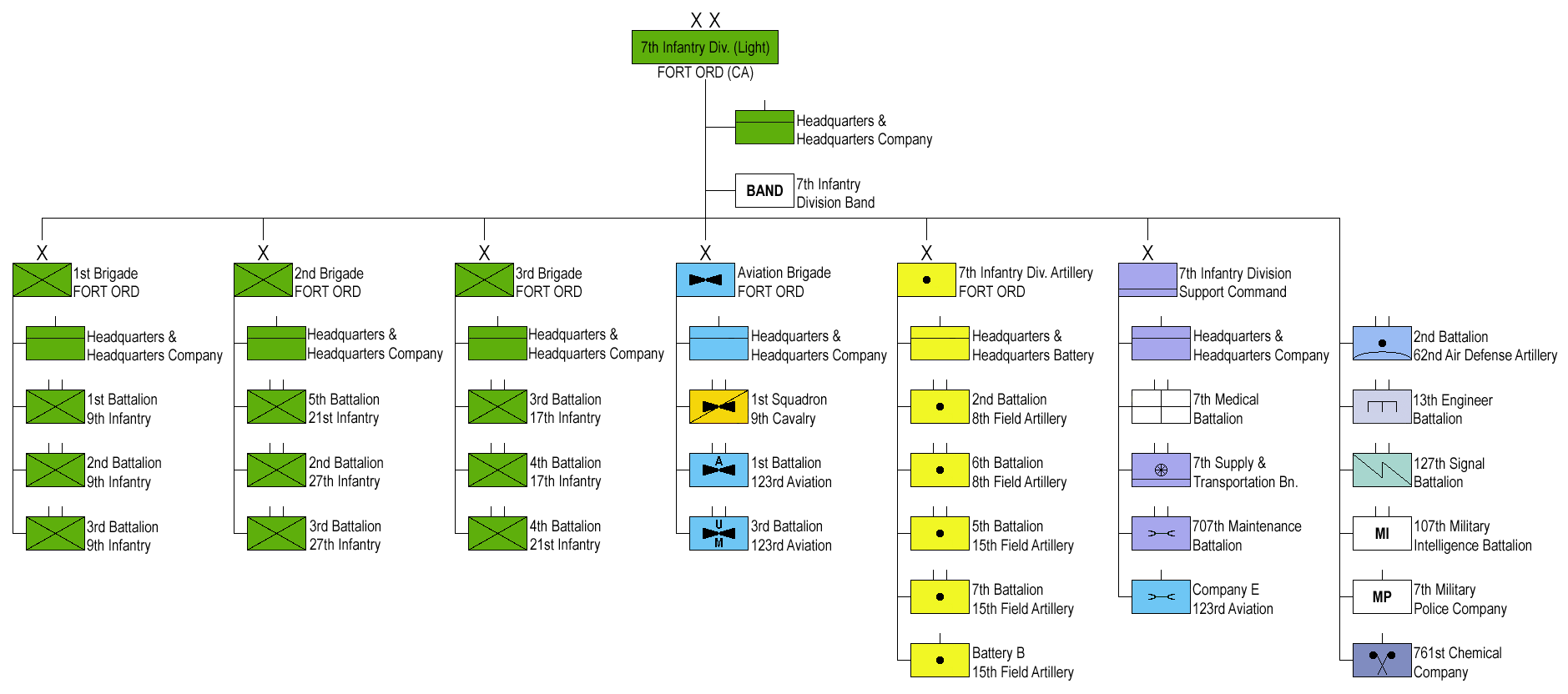
7th Infantry Division (Light) 1989 (click to enlarge)

At the end of the Cold War the division was organized as follows:

- 7th Infantry Division (Light), Fort Ord, California
  - Headquarters & Headquarters Company
  - 1st Brigade
    - 1st Battalion, 9th Infantry
    - 2d Battalion, 9th Infantry
    - 3d Battalion, 9th Infantry
  - 2d Brigade
    - 5th Battalion, 21st Infantry
    - 2d Battalion, 27th Infantry
    - 3d Battalion, 27th Infantry
  - 3d Brigade
    - 3d Battalion, 17th Infantry
    - 4th Battalion, 17th Infantry
    - 4th Battalion, 21st Infantry
  - Aviation Brigade
    - Headquarters & Headquarters Company
    - 2d Squadron, 9th Cavalry (Reconnaissance)
    - 1st Battalion, 123d Aviation (Attack)
    - 3d Battalion, 123d Aviation (Combat Support)
  - Division Artillery
    - Headquarters & Headquarters Battery
    - 2d Battalion, 8th Field Artillery (18 × M119 105 mm towed howitzer)
    - 6th Battalion, 8th Field Artillery (18 × M119 105 mm towed howitzer)
    - 5th Battalion, 15th Field Artillery (18 × M198 155 mm towed howitzer, attached I Corps Artillery unit)
    - 7th Battalion, 15th Field Artillery (18 × M119 105 mm towed howitzer)
    - Battery B, 15th Field Artillery (8 × M198 155 mm towed howitzer)
  - Division Support Command
    - Headquarters & Headquarters Company
    - 7th Medical Battalion
    - 7th Supply & Transportation Battalion
    - 707th Maintenance Battalion
    - Company D, 123d Aviation (Maintenance, redesignated Company E, 123d Aviation on 16 October 1988)
  - 2d Battalion, 62d Air Defense Artillery
  - 13th Engineer Battalion
  - 127th Signal Battalion
  - 107th Military Intelligence Battalion
  - 7th Military Police Company
  - 761st Chemical Company
  - 7th Division Band

=== National Guard training command and Fort Carson ===
At the end of the Cold War, the US Army considered new options for the integration and organization of active duty, Army Reserve and Army National Guard units in training and deployment. Two Active Component division headquarters were created to train National Guard brigades. The 7th Infantry Division and the 24th Infantry Division headquarters were selected. Their active duty status allowed the two division headquarters to focus on the national guard units under them full-time.

The headquarters company of the 7th Infantry Division (Light) formally reactivated on 4 June 1999, at Fort Carson, Colorado, as the first Active Component/Reserve Component division. The three Guard brigades that made up the 7th Infantry Division were the 39th Infantry Brigade Combat Team of the Arkansas National Guard, the 41st Infantry Brigade Combat Team of the Oregon National Guard and the 45th Infantry Brigade Combat Team of the Oklahoma National Guard.

The division headquarters also provided training assistance in preparation for small-scale National Guard operations, Joint Readiness Training Center rotations, leadership training for National Guard commanders, and annual summer training for the three brigades. As a part of this commitment, the 7th Infantry Division headquarters would deploy a command element to serve as higher headquarters for large-scale training and field exercises, evaluating and coordinating the units as they trained. It would also conduct quarterly status checks with the three brigades to discuss readiness and resource issues affecting those units, ensuring that they were at peak performance should they be needed.

To expand upon the concept of Reserve component and National Guard components, the First Army activated Division East and Division West, two commands responsible for training reserve units' readiness and mobilization exercises. Division West, activated at Fort Carson. This transformation was part of an overall restructuring of the US Army to streamline the organizations overseeing training. The Division West took control of reserve units in 21 states west of the Mississippi River, eliminating the need for the 7th Infantry Division headquarters. It was subsequently inactivated on 22 August 2006 at Fort Carson.

The division was identified as the highest priority inactive division in the United States Army Center of Military History's scheme based on age, campaign participation credit, and unit decorations. All of the division's flags and heraldic items were moved to the National Infantry Museum at Fort Benning, Georgia following its inactivation. At the time it was determined that, should the US Army decide to activate more divisions in the future, the center would most likely suggest the first new division be the 7th Infantry Division, the second be the 9th Infantry Division, the third be the 24th Infantry Division, the fourth be the 5th Infantry Division, and the fifth be the 2nd Armored Division.

=== Headquarters reactivation ===
On 26 April 2012, Secretary of the Army John M. McHugh announced the 7th Infantry Division headquarters would be reactivated at Joint Base Lewis-McChord in October 2012. The headquarters element of about 250 would not activate any subordinate brigades. Instead, it filled an administrative role as a non-deployable unit. In the announcement, McHugh noted the base is home to I Corps, which until then had directly overseen 10 subordinate brigades on the base, while other bases with similar corps headquarters had active division commands for intermediate oversight. The unit oversees the 2nd and 3rd Brigade Combat Teams of the 2nd Infantry Division, as well as the 17th Field Artillery Brigade, 201st Battlefield Surveillance Brigade, 16th Combat Aviation Brigade, and 555th Engineer Brigade, about 21,000 personnel. The mission of the headquarters primarily focuses on making sure soldiers are properly trained and equipped, and that order and discipline is maintained in its subordinate brigades.

In the announcement, McHugh denied that the move was made in response to several high-profile misconduct allegations leveled against soldiers from the base in the Afghanistan War such as the Maywand District murders and the Kandahar massacre. Major General Stephen R. Lanza, the Army's chief of public affairs, was tapped to lead the division. It activated on the base on 10 October 2012.

On 16 August 2024, the 1st and 2nd Stryker Brigade Combat Teams were part of a re-patching ceremony officially realigning these two brigades from the 2nd Infantry Division to the 7th Infantry Division. According to the 7th Infantry Division official Facebook post about this event, "This historic event honors their extensive legacy, creates a stronger and more unified force and brings Bayonet Soldiers closer together."

On 18 June 2026, Soldiers from the 7th Infantry Division and 1st Multi-Domain Task Force held a redesignation ceremony at Joint Base Lewis-McChord to case the 1st MDTF Headquarters and 7th ID Headquarters Support Company colors and uncase the 7th Infantry Division (Multi-Domain Command-Pacific) Headquarters and Headquarters Battalion colors, marking a major organizational shift. The redesignation honors the Bayonet Division's legacy while establishing the 7th Infantry Division (Multi-Domain Command-Pacific) as the Army's newest theater-enabling command, built to integrate maneuver, fires, air defense, cyber, space, electronic warfare, intelligence, unmanned systems, sustainment and command and control in support of the joint force across the Pacific.

On 8 October 2026, the US Army activated the 4th Multi-Domain Task Force that will report to the 7th Infantry Division MDC-PAC.

== Division organization ==
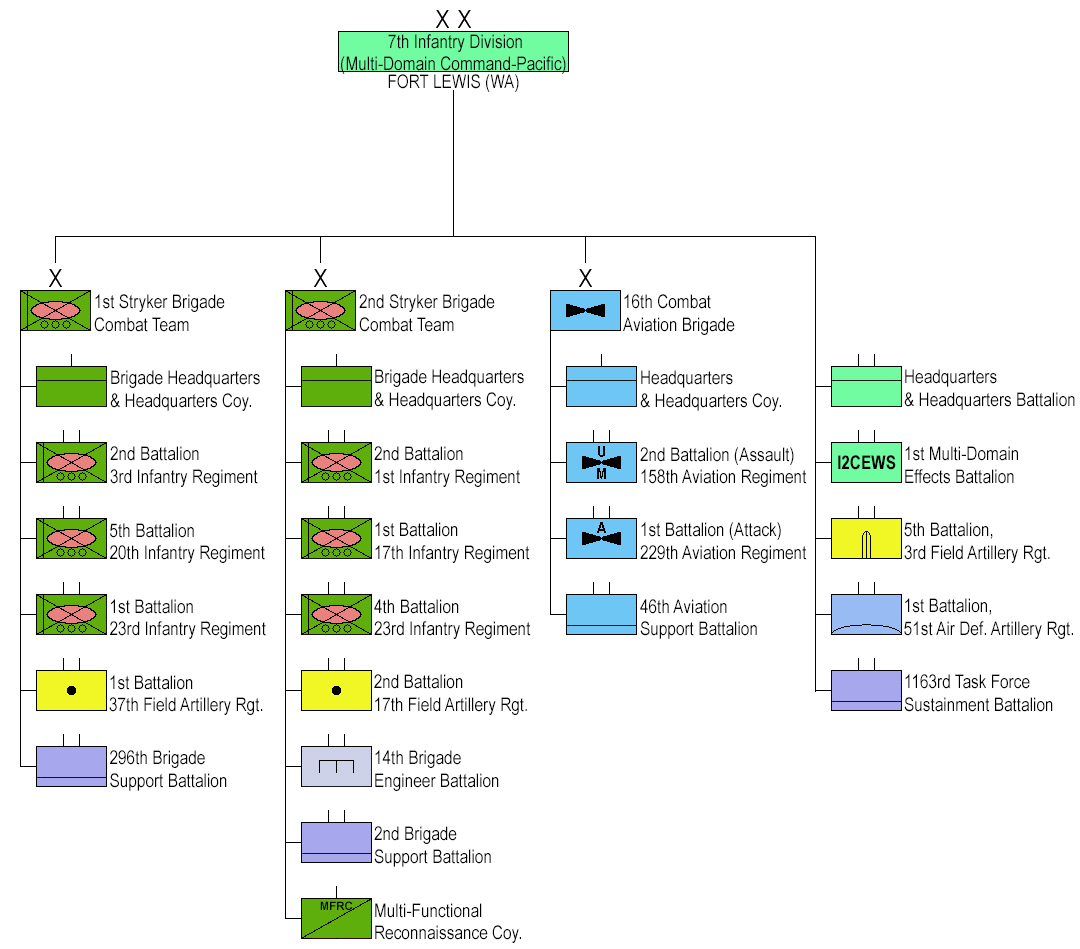
7th Infantry Division (Multi-Domain Command - Pacific) organization as of October 2026

As of October 2026 the new command consists of the following units:

- Command Headquarters, at Joint Base Lewis-McChord, (Washington)
  - Headquarters and Headquarters Battalion
  - 1st Stryker Brigade Combat Team, 7th Infantry Division
    - Headquarters and Headquarters Company
    - 2nd Battalion, 3rd Infantry Regiment (Stryker)
    - 5th Battalion, 20th Infantry Regiment (Stryker)
    - 1st Battalion, 23rd Infantry Regiment (Stryker)
    - 1st Battalion, 37th Field Artillery Regiment
    - 296th Brigade Support Battalion
  - 2nd Stryker Brigade Combat Team, 7th Infantry Division
    - Headquarters and Headquarters Company
    - 2nd Battalion, 1st Infantry Regiment (Stryker)
    - 1st Battalion, 17th Infantry Regiment (Stryker)
    - 4th Battalion, 23rd Infantry Regiment (Stryker)
    - 2nd Battalion, 17th Field Artillery Regiment
    - 14th Brigade Engineer Battalion
    - 2nd Brigade Support Battalion
    - Multi-Functional Reconnaissance Company
  - 16th Combat Aviation Brigade
    - Headquarters and Headquarters Company
    - 1st Battalion (Attack), 229th Aviation Regiment (AH-64E Apache)
    - 2nd Battalion (Assault), 158th Aviation Regiment (UH-60 Black Hawk)
    - 1st Battalion (General Support), 52nd Aviation Regiment (UH-60, CH-47 Chinook and UH-60A+; assigned to Arctic Aviation Command, 11th Airborne Division)
    - 46th Aviation Support Battalion
  - 4th Multi-Domain Task Force, at Fort Carson (CO)
    - Headquarters and Headquarters Battalion
    - 4th Multi-Domain Effects Battalion
    - 1st Battalion, 10th Field Artillery Regiment (Long-Range Fires Battalion equipped with M142 HIMARS and Long-Range Hypersonic Weapon)
    - Indirect Fire Protection Capability Battalion (IFPC) (to be formed)
    - Task Force Sustainment Battalion (to be formed)
  - 1st Multi-Domain Effects Battalion
  - 5th Battalion, 3rd Field Artillery Regiment (Long-Range Fires Battalion equipped with M142 HIMARS and Long-Range Hypersonic Weapon)
  - 1st Battalion, 51st Air Defense Artillery Regiment (Indirect Fire Protection Capability Battalion)
  - 1163rd Task Force Support Battalion

== Honors ==
The 7th Infantry Division was awarded one campaign streamer in World War I, four campaign streamers and two unit decorations in World War II, and ten campaign streamers and two unit decorations in the Korean War, for a total of fifteen campaign streamers and four unit decorations in its operational history.

=== Unit decorations ===
Ribbon	Award	Year	Notes
Vertical tricolor red (blue, white, red) with gold border	Philippine Presidential Unit Citation	1944–1945	for service in the Philippines during World War II
White ribbon with vertical green and red stripes on its edges and a red and blue circle in the middle	Republic of Korea Presidential Unit Citation	1950	for the Inchon Landings
	Republic of Korea Presidential Unit Citation	1950–1953	for service in Korea
	Republic of Korea Presidential Unit Citation	1945–1948; 1953–1971	for service in Korea

=== Campaign streamers ===
Conflict	Streamer	Year(s)
World War I	Lorraine	1918
World War II	Aleutian Islands	1943
World War II	Eastern Mandates	1944
World War II	Leyte	1945
World War II	Ryukyus	1945
Korean War	UN Defensive	1950
Korean War	UN Offensive	1950
Korean War	CCF Intervention	1950
Korean War	First UN Counteroffensive	1950
Korean War	CCF Spring Offensive	1951
Korean War	UN Summer-Fall Offensive	1951
Korean War	Second Korean Winter	1951–1952
Korean War	Korea, Summer-Fall 1952	1952
Korean War	Third Korean Winter	1952–1953
Korean War	Korea, Summer 1953	1953
Armed Forces Expeditionary	Panama	1989
