= Operation Golden Pheasant =

1988 deployment of US troops in Honduras

Coordinates: 14.392°N 87.621°W

- Part of the Nicaraguan Revolution
Date	March 1988
Location	Honduras
Result	US-Honduran strategic victory: Withdrawal of Nicaraguan forces from Honduran territory

Belligerents
United States; Honduras	Nicaragua

Commanders and leaders
(United States) President Ronald Reagan (United States) George Fisher (Honduras) José Azcona del Hoyo	(Nicaragua) Humberto Ortega (Nicaragua) Daniel Ortega

Units involved
(United States) 7th Infantry Division (Light) (United States) 82nd Airborne Division (United States) 504th Parachute Infantry Regiment, A company, C company, HHC company Scout Platoon 3rd Battalion 505th Parachute Infantry Regiment (United States) 27th Infantry Regiment (United States) 9th Infantry Regiment (Honduras) Honduran Army	(Nicaragua) Sandinista Popular Army

Strength
(United States) 5,000 (Honduras) 12,000	(Nicaragua) 9,000

Casualties and losses
(Honduras) 21 or less were killed	(Nicaragua) 29 or more were killed

Operation Golden Pheasant was an emergency deployment of U.S. troops to Honduras in 1988, in response to Nicaraguan attacks on Contra logistics in Honduras.

== History ==
In early March 1988, the Nicaraguan Sandinista government launched Operation Danto 88 to overrun Contra rebel supply caches in the San Andrés de Bocay region, crossing into Honduran territory in their drive.

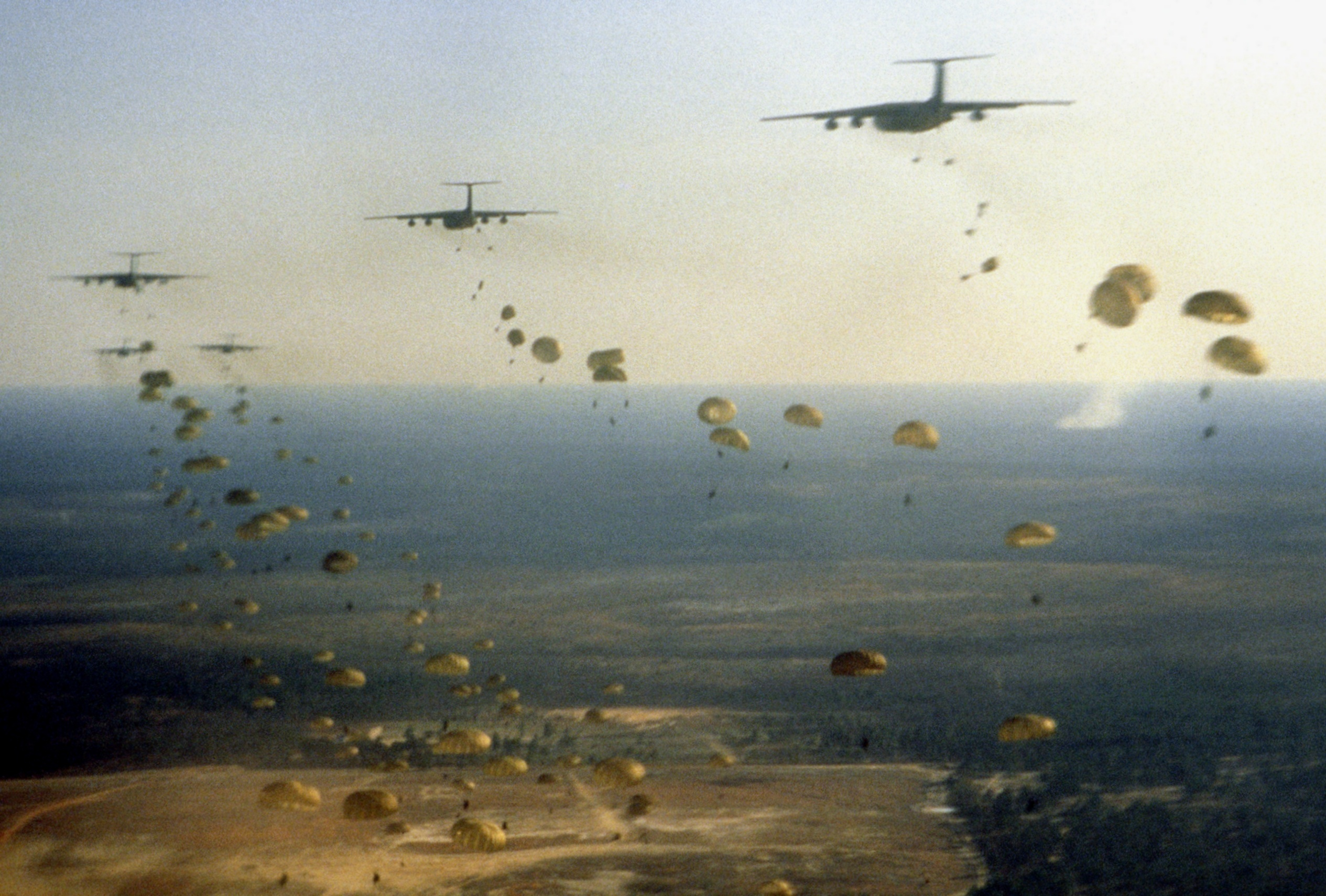
Members of the U.S. Army 1st and 2nd Battalions, 504th Parachute Infantry Regiment, 82nd Airborne Division jump from USAF Lockheed C-141B Starlifter aircraft on 1 March 1988

The United States, under President Ronald Reagan, dispatched elements of the 7th Infantry Division (Light) Quick Reaction Force (QRF) on a no-notice deployment. This small force quickly landed at Palmerola Air Base (now known as Soto Cano Air Base) and were moved quickly into position at a Honduran military base to facilitate the guarding of a local general. An international special operations unit led by Orlando Lentini, and the aviation assets of Joint Task Force Bravo (JTF-B) stationed on Pamerola AB, worked along with the 7th Infantry Division and were on the ground several days when the 82nd Airborne elements arrived. The deployment evolved into a live-fire exercise, the light infantry soldiers, paratroopers and special operations unit deployed ready to fight, causing the Sandinistas to rapidly withdraw back across their border.

The 1st and 2nd Battalions of the 504th Parachute Infantry Regiment and Charlie Company, 3rd Battalion of the 505th Parachute Infantry Regiment 82nd Airborne Division, were joined by soldiers from the 2nd Battalion 9th Infantry Regiment, 2d and 3d Battalions of the 27th Infantry Regiment, 7th Infantry Division (Light) QRF from Fort Ord, California.

On 17 March, 1st Battalion landed at Palmerola Air Base. The 2nd Battalion jumped onto the airfield that day, with only one casualty-the Executive Officer broke his leg on landing. Soldiers of the 27th Infantry Regiment (the "Wolfhounds") rappelled onto the airbase on 17 March 1988 and were moved quickly up to the Nicaraguan border. 2/27th Infantry trained with the Honduran 11th Infantry Battalion at San Lorenzo, 3/27 Infantry trained with the Honduran 9th Infantry Battalion in Jamastran, 2/504 Airborne trained with the Honduran 2nd Infantry Battalion Airborne in Tamara, and 1/504 trained with the Honduran 16th Infantry Battalion in Juticalpa.

Prior to the deployment of combat forces the U.S. had deployed an Engineer Task Force (20th Engineer Brigade, from Fort Bragg, NC) of about 1100 soldiers for Ahuas Tara 88, an annual exercise providing assistance to Honduras. The Engineers were tasked with building roads, bridges, ports and buildings to build confidence with allied forces and to gain real world experience deploying and operating in an austere environment. The Engineer Task Force augmented and supported deploying combat forces with engineering, logistical, and communications troops. When combat forces redeployed the Engineers continued their mission.

The units from the 82nd Airborne, the 504th, began rigorous training exercises with orders to avoid the fighting on the border. Had those orders changed, the paratroopers and infantrymen were prepared to fight, but the invading Sandinista troops had already begun to withdraw. Within days, the Sandinista government negotiated a truce with Contra leaders, and by the end of March the 7th Infantry had returned to Fort Ord, California and the paratroopers of the 82nd had returned to Fort Bragg.

== Participating units ==
=== United States Army units ===
- Elements of Company C, 214th Aviation Regiment, 1st Corps, assigned to JTFB at Palmerola AB
- Elements of 9th Aviation Battalion, 9th Aviation Regiment, 9th Infantry Division, assigned to JTFB at Palmerola AB
- 2nd Battalion, 9th Infantry Regiment, 7th Infantry Division (Light)
- Headquarters and Headquarters Company, 9th Infantry Regiment, 7th Infantry Division (Light)
- Battery B, 6/8 Field Artillery, 7th Infantry Division (Light)
- 13th Engineer Battalion
- 1st Battalion, 504th Parachute Infantry Regiment, 82nd Airborne Division
- 2nd Battalion, 504th Parachute Infantry Regiment, 82nd Airborne Division
- Company C, 3rd Battalion, 505th Parachute Infantry Regiment, 82nd Airborne Division
- Company A, 3rd Battalion, 505th Parachute Infantry Regiment, 82nd Airborne Division
- Company HHC 3rd Battalion, 505th Parachute Infantry Regiment, Scout Platoon
- Company D, 1st Battalion, 325th Airborne Infantry Regiment, 82nd Airborne Division
- General Support (GS) Platoon, 782nd Maintenance Battalion, 82nd Airborne Division
- Company B, 307th Medical Battalion, 82nd Airborne Division
- General Support (GS) Platoon, 82nd Military Police Company, 82d Airborne Division
- Company B, 407th Supply and Transport Battalion, 82d Airborne Division
- Company C, and HQ Elements, 3rd Battalion (Airborne), 73rd Armor, 82nd Airborne Division
- 3rd Battalion, 9th Infantry Regiment, 7th Infantry Division (Light)
- 2nd Battalion, 27th Infantry Regiment, 7th Infantry Division (Light)
- 3rd Battalion, 27th Infantry Regiment, 7th Infantry Division (Light)
- 21st Military Police Company (Airborne), 503rd Airborne MP Battalion, 16th MP Brigade (Airborne)
- 313th Military Intelligence Battalion, 82nd Airborne Division
- Battery A, 1/14th Field Artillery, 24th Infantry Division
- Battery B, 3rd Battalion, 319th Airborne Field Artillery Regiment, 82nd Airborne Division
- Company A, 1st Battalion, 9th Infantry Regiment, 7th Infantry Division (Light) along with elements of Headquarters and
- Headquarters Company, 1st Battalion, 9th Infantry Regiment
- Joint Task Force Bravo, 401st Military Police Company
- 7th Special Forces Group (Airborne)
- Second Battalion, 9th Aviation Regiment
- 864th Engineering Battalion (Combat, Heavy)
- 1st Squadron 17th Cavalry Regiment (Airborne, Air Cav)
- 988th MP Company, 3rd Platoon
- 937th Engineering Group
- Company C, 426th Signal Battalion (retasked from supporting Exercise Ahuas Tara 88)
- HHC 50th Signal Battalion (Airborne, 18th Airborne Corps Electronic Technician)
- Elements of Assault Command Post Platoon, A Company, 50th Signal Battalion (Airborne)
- Company A, 307th Engineer Battalion, 82nd Airborne Division
- Battery A, 2nd Battalion, 62nd Regiment Air Defense Artillery, Stinger Teams, 7th Infantry Division (Light)
- Already deployed in country in support of Ahuas Tara
- 27th Engineer Battalion (Combat)(Airborne)
- B Co, 11th Engineer Battalion (Combat, Heavy)
- HHC, 20th Engineer Brigade
- C Co, 426th Signal Battalion
- 235th Signal Company (Satellite Communication)
- 377th Military Police Company

=== United States Marine Corps units ===
- 2nd Battalion 7th Marines
- 2nd Battalion 5th Marines
- 2nd Battalion 9th Marines

=== United States Air Force units ===
- 113th Civil Engineer Squadron (District of Columbia Air National Guard)
- 1352nd Aerospace Audiovisual Squadron
- 3rd MAPS Pope AFB
- Det 1, 507th Tactical Air Control Wing, Pope AFB
- 183rd Airlift Squadron (Mississippi Air National Guard)

437th military airlift wing Charleston AFB 0306th Air Refueling Squadron Altus AFB, OK
