= 53rd Infantry Regiment (United States) =

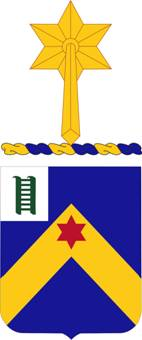
- Coat of arms
- Active: 1917−22; 1926−45
- Country: United States
- Branch: United States Army
- Type: Infantry regiment
- Role: Light infantry
- Size: Regiment
- Mottos: "Courage Sans Peur" (Courage Without Fear)
- Engagements: World War I World War II

Commanders
- Notable commanders: Bradford G. Chynoweth; Henning Linden

Insignia
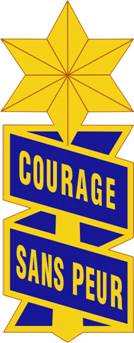
- Distinctive unit insignia

The 53rd Infantry Regiment was a regiment of Infantry of the United States Army. It served as a part of the 7th Infantry Division for most of its history.

== History ==
=== World War I ===
The 53rd Infantry Regiment, together with the 54th Infantry Regiment, served from November 1917 as 12th Infantry Brigade of the 6th Infantry Division.

=== Interwar period ===
The regiment arrived at the port of New York on 12 June 1919 on the USS Leviathan and was transferred 18 June 1919 to Camp Grant, Illinois. It was transferred 3 October 1921 to Fort D.A. Russell, Wyoming. The regiment was inactivated on 23 September 1922 and allotted to the Seventh Corps Area for mobilization responsibility. The 3rd Infantry Regiment was previously designated as "Active Associate" on 27 July 1921, and was intended to provide the cadre from which the regiment would be reactivated in the event of war. The 53rd Infantry was relieved from the 6th Division on 24 March 1923 and assigned to the 7th Division.

With the abandonment of the "Active Associate" program, the 53rd Infantry was organized in October 1926 with Organized Reserve personnel as a "Regular Army Inactive" unit with headquarters at Minneapolis, Minnesota; the 3rd Infantry was relieved as Active Associate on 28 February 1927. The 53rd Infantry was affiliated with the University of Minnesota's ROTC program on 28 April 1930, but this affiliation was withdrawn on 6 October 1934. The regiment typically conducted inactive training period meetings at the University of Minnesota's ROTC armory or the Federal Building in Minneapolis. Summer training was held at Fort Snelling, Minnesota, and some years at Fort Des Moines, Iowa. The regiment also conducted infantry Citizens Military Training Camps some years at Fort Snelling as an alternate form of summer training. The designated mobilization training station for the regiment was Fort Snelling.

=== World War II ===
On 1 July 1940, the regiment was reactivated, less Reserve personnel, and assigned to the 7th Infantry Division at Camp Ord, California, under the command of Major General Joseph W. Stilwell. The 12th and 13th Infantry Brigade did not reactivate as part of an army-wide elimination of brigade commands within its divisions. The division was instead centered on three infantry regiments; the 17th Infantry Regiment, the 32nd Infantry Regiment, and the 53rd Infantry Regiment. Most of the soldiers in the division were selective service soldiers, chosen as a part of the US Army's first peacetime military draft.

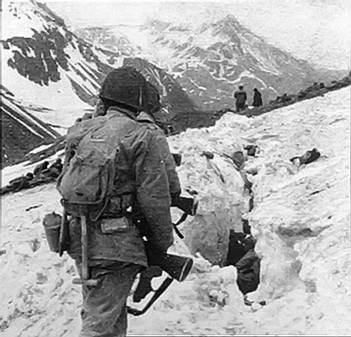
7th Infantry Division troops negotiate snow and ice during the battle on Attu in May, 1943.

The 7th Infantry Division was assigned to III Corps of the Fourth United States Army, and that year it was sent to Oregon for tactical maneuvers. Division units also practiced boat loading at the Monterey Wharf and amphibious assault techniques at the Salinas River in California. With the Japanese attack of Pearl Harbor, the division was sent to Camp San Luis Obispo to continue its training. The 53rd Infantry Regiment was removed from the 7th Division and replaced with the 159th Infantry Regiment, newly deployed from the California Army National Guard. The regiment then embarked to Alaska and garrisoned Adak Island.

The regiment's distinctive unit insignia (DUI) was redesignated for the 53d Infantry Battalion on 3 February 1947. According to Sawiecki's Infantry Regiments of the US Army, it was redesignated the 53rd Airborne Infantry Regiment and attached to the 101st Airborne Division on 15 September 1950. It was activated at Camp Breckinridge, Kentucky on 29 September 1950 and inactivated at Camp Breckinridge on 1 December 1953. The DUI was redesignated for the 53rd Infantry Regiment on 24 March 1955.
