= 4th Battalion, 17th Infantry Regiment =

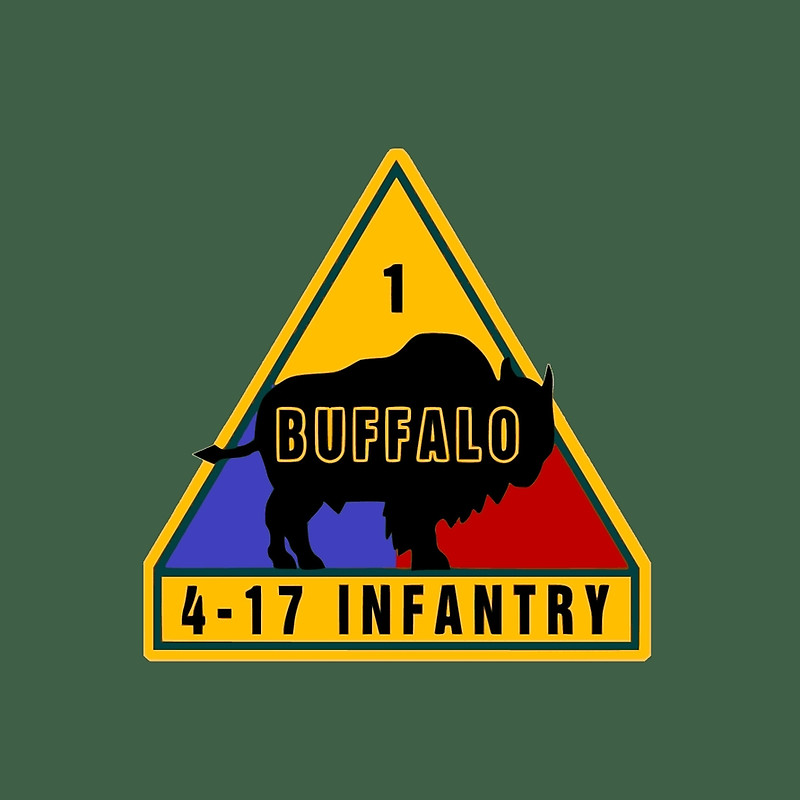
- Unofficial insignia of the 4th Battalion, 17th Infantry Regiment.
- Active: 1861–2019
- Country: United States
- Branch: Army
- Type: Infantry
- Garrison/HQ: Fort Bliss, Texas
- Nickname: "The Buffalos"
- Mottos: Truth and Courage
- Engagements: American Civil War; Spanish–American War; World War II; Korean War; Vietnam War; Panama; Iraq; Afghanistan

Commanders
- LTC Anthony Gore: Last Commander

The 4th Battalion, 17th Infantry Regiment was a United States Army infantry battalion. The lineage of the battalion originated with Company D of the 17th Regiment of Infantry, constituted on 3 May 1861.

== History ==
=== American Civil War ===
In April 1861, the bombardment of Fort Sumter stood as the opening engagement of the American Civil War. It was the boiling point as the tension between the seceded States and the Union turned to violence. This caused President Abraham Lincoln to call for the buildup of the Union Army, an Army that would protect the Union and its interests. The President's call resulted in the 17th Infantry being constituted in the Regular Army on 3 May 1861. The Adjutant General office of President Lincoln issued General Order 16 bringing the regiment back into existence. It differed from the older regiments of infantry in that it had three battalions with one major, one adjutant, one quartermaster and commissary, one sergeant-major, one commissary sergeant, and one hospital steward with eight companies each. The 17th Infantry Regiment was in the Army of the Potomac as part of "Slow Trot" Skykes Division. From the 5th Army Corps, the 17th Infantry Regiment adopted the white cross patee which is seen today on the regimental coat of arms. At Fredericksburg, the 17th suffered heavy losses in the assault on the famous stone wall. The men of the 17th lay flat on their faces eighty yards in front of the famous stone wall and drew heavy fire from rebel sharpshooters. This wall is also represented on the regimental crest.

=== Indian Wars ===
The 17th Infantry Regiment fought valiantly in the Indian wars, as is depicted on the regimental coat of arms by two sable arrows, armed and flighted gules. Throughout the Indian Wars, the regiment successfully fought over rough terrain against a determined enemy. The Regiment earned streamers for the Little Big Horn (1876); Pine Ridge (1890–1891); North Dakota 1872.

=== Spanish–American War ===
The sinking of the USS Maine (ACR-1) in Havana, Cuba once again led the US into war, this time against Spain on 21 April 1898. The 17th Infantry Regiment again found itself in combat. The five bastioned forts on the regimental crest represent the regiment's service with the V Corps in Cuba. For three months, American soldiers fought in the jungles, and the Soldiers of the 17th Infantry distinguished themselves. On 1 July 1898, at El Caney, Cuba: PVT George Berg, PVT Oscar Brookin, CPL Ulysses Buzzard, PVT Thomas J. Graves, 1LT Benjamin Hardaway, CPL Norman Ressler, 2LT Charles DuVal Roberts, CPL Warren Shepherd and PVT Bruno Wende earned this nation's highest military award for valor, the Medal of Honor, all of these Soldiers were proud members of the 17th Infantry Regiment.

The Spanish–American War left Spain's military devastated and this proved a critical point for the Philippine Islands as they grasped the opportunity to gain freedom. Their alliance with the U.S. was short-lived and in 1899 combat ensued in Manila. A sea lion was taken from the Spanish Arms of Manila and is depicted on the regimental coat of arms. The 17th Infantry Regiment fought valiantly and tenaciously, continually displaying heroism and courage.

=== Mexico ===
On 8 March 1916 Pancho Villa raided Columbus, New Mexico. Villa's invasion of the U.S. spurred the 17th Infantry Regiment into action as they served in Pershing's forces to bring Villa to justice.

=== World War II ===
In June 1942 the Japanese invaded the Aleutian Islands. In 1943, the 17th Infantry Regiment was called to action as part of the 7th Infantry Division and the Regiment was chosen to land at Red Beach, Holtz Bay, on Attu Island in the Bering Sea. The Regiment fought as part of the 7th Infantry Division "Bayonet" throughout World War II. PFC Leonard Brostrom and PFC John Thorson both earned the Medal of Honor for their gallantry during heavy fighting on Leyte, the Philippine Islands on 28 October 1944, as soldiers from the 17th Infantry Regiment. During World War II the 17th fought in the Aleutian Islands, Eastern Mandates, Leyte, and Ryukyus.

=== Korean War ===
The Buffaloes served during the Korean War. They partook in the UN Defensive, UN Offensive, CCF Intervention, First UN Counteroffensive, CCF Spring Offensive, UN Summer-Fall Offensive, Second Korean Winter, Korea Summer-Fall 1952, Third Korean Winter and Korea, Summer 1953. Seven of the 17th Infantry Regiments Soldiers earned the Medal of Honor during the Korean War: CPT Raymond Harvey, CPL Einar Ingman, PFC Anthony T. Kahoʻohanohano, CPL William Lyell, PFC Joseph Rodriguez. Also, 1LT Richard Shea and PVT Charles Barker both earned the Medal of Honor for their courage and gallantry at Pork Chop Hill.

=== Vietnam War ===
In 1970, the 17th Infantry Regiment joined the Vietnam War. During this period President Richard Nixon began the Nixon Doctrine, which later became known as "Vietnamization." This plan called for the buildup of the Army of the Republic of Vietnam to defend South Vietnam. The battle-hardened Buffaloes served in Counteroffensive Phase VII, Consolidation I, Consolidation II, and Cease Fire.

=== Operation Just Cause ===
In 1989 President George H. W. Bush called for the use of force against Panama and its dictator, Manuel Noriega. Declaring that an operation was necessary to safeguard the lives of U.S. citizens in Panama, defend democracy and human rights, combat drug trafficking, and secure the functioning of the Panama Canal. Operation Just Cause involved over 27,000 Soldiers including the 17th Infantry Regiment as members of the 7th IN DIV (L).

=== Current status ===
The 17th Infantry was activated once again at Fort Bliss Texas as a part of the Ready First Stryker Brigade Combat Team, 1st Armored Division on 11 January 2011. The unit deployed to Kandahar Province, Afghanistan in support of Operation Enduring Freedom between 2013 and 2014. It was deactivated again when the brigade reorganized as an armored brigade combat team.

== Decorations ==
- Presidential Unit Citation (Army), Streamer embroidered LEYTE
- Philippine Presidential Unit Citation, Streamer embroidered 17 October 1944 TO 4 July 1945
- Republic of Korea Presidential Unit Citation, Streamer embroidered INCHON
- Republic of Korea Presidential Unit Citation, Streamer embroidered KOREA 1950–1953
- Republic of Korea Presidential Unit Citation, Streamer embroidered KOREA 1952–1953
- Republic of Korea Presidential Unit Citation, Streamer embroidered KOREA 1945–1948; 1953–1957
