= Charles Barker =

Charles Barker may refer to:

- Charles Barker (advertising agent) (1791–1859), English advertising agent
- Charles Barker (cricketer) (1847–1891), English cricketer
- Charles Barker (legislator), American politician
- Charles H. Barker (1935–1953), American Korean War soldier
- Charles S. Barker (1805–1879), British inventor and organ builder
- Don Barker (politician) (Charles William Donald Barker, 1904–1956), Australian Labor Party politician
