= 17th Infantry Regiment (United States) =

- Coat of arms
- Active: 1861–present
- Country: United States
- Branch: United States Army
- Type: Infantry
- Garrison/HQ: Joint Base Lewis–McChord, Fort Bliss
- Nickname: "The Buffalos"
- Mottos: Truth and Courage
- Engagements: American Civil War; Spanish–American War; World War II; Korean War; Vietnam War; Panama; Iraq; Afghanistan

Commanders
- Notable commanders: William Wilson Quinn; Clement A. Trott; John T. Van Orsdale; James Durrell Greene

Insignia
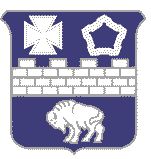
- Distinctive unit insignia

The 17th Infantry Regiment is a United States Army infantry regiment. An earlier regiment designated the 17th Infantry Regiment was organized on 11 January 1812, but it was consolidated with four other regiments as the 3rd Infantry in the post-war reorganization of the army following the War of 1812, due to the shattering losses it sustained at the River Raisin. The current 17th Infantry was constituted as the 17th Regiment of Infantry on 3 May 1861.

== History ==
=== Civil War ===
The 17th U.S. Infantry Regiment served in the Army of the Potomac, in Sykes' Division of the 5th Army Corps. Its badge was a white cross patee.

During the Battle of Fredericksburg, the 17th U.S. Infantry suffered heavy losses in the assault on Robert E. Lee's Confederates entrenched behind a stone wall. "For one entire day, (December 14) the men of the 17th lay flat on their faces eighty yards in front of the famous stone wall, behind which the enemy was posted in large numbers and any movement on their part was sure to draw the fire of rebel sharpshooters."

On the second day of the Battle of Gettysburg, the 17th U.S. Infantry Regiment, commanded by Colonel James Durrell Greene, fought in tough hand-to-hand combat in the "Wheatfield." The 17th US Infantry lost 24 men killed and 125 wounded or missing in this engagement.

=== Interwar period ===
The 17th Infantry was stationed at Camp Meade, Maryland as of July 1919 as a separate regiment. It was transferred on 8 October 1920 to Fort McIntosh, Texas. It was designated as a training center regiment on 27 July 1921 and was assigned to the Eighth Corps Area Training Center; the 2nd and 3rd Battalions were inactivated on 1 October 1921 at Fort McIntosh. The regiment was transferred on 5 November 1921 to Fort Sam Houston, Texas. When Corps Area Training Center activities began to end in mid-1922, the regiment, minus the 2nd and 3rd Battalions, was transferred on 20 June 1922 to Fort Crook, Nebraska; the 2nd and 3rd Battalions were reactivated on 24 June 1922 at Fort Crook when the regiment was relieved of training center duties and reorganized into a combat regiment. The 17th Infantry was assigned to the 7th Division on 24 March 1923. The 2nd Battalion was transferred on 23 June 1926 to Fort Des Moines, Iowa. It was relieved from the 7th Division on 15 August 1927 and assigned to the 6th Division. The 2nd Battalion was inactivated on 31 October 1929 at Fort Des Moines. The 3rd Battalion was transferred on 10 September 1931 to Fort Leavenworth, Kansas. In April 1933, the regiment assumed command and control of the Nebraska and Arkansas Civilian Conservation Corps (CCC) Districts and portions of the South Dakota CCC District in February 1936. The regiment was relieved from the 6th Division on 1 October 1933 and reassigned to the 7th Division. The 2nd Battalion was reactivated 1 July 1940 at Camp Ord, California, and the regiment, less the 2nd Battalion, was transferred on 10 September 1940 to Camp Ord. Assigned Reserve officers conducted summer training with active elements of the regiment at Fort Crook.

=== Afghanistan ===
The 1st Battalion, 17th Infantry Regiment (1-17th) suffered the highest casualty rate of any US infantry battalion in the War in Afghanistan. The battalion took over the Arghandab and Lower Shah Wali Kot districts from one company of Canadian troops who had not had the manpower to take the fight to the Taliban. The battalion was very successful regaining control over the area despite losing Alpha Company for part of the deployment to help the Marines in the Helmand Province.

== Coat of arms ==
A buffalo, displayed on a shield below the stone wall, represents the regiment's history in the Korean war. The "Buffalo" nickname was adopted at the suggestion of the 17th Regiment's commander in the Korean War, Col. William W. "Buffalo Bill" Quinn.

The shield is blue, as it is the color of the infantry.

The crest is a sea lion taken from the Spanish Arms of Manila to represent the fighting for that city in 1898.

The five-bastioned fort, shown on the blue shield above and to the right of the stone wall, was the badge of the 5th Army Corps in Cuba in 1898.

The two arrows represent the Indian campaigns the 17th Regiment participated in.

The 17th Infantry Regiment was in the Army of the Potomac during the Civil War in Sykes' Division of the 5th Army Corps, the badge of which was a white Cross pattée, which is embodied in the coat of arms and shown on the blue field above and to the left of the stone wall.

At Fredericksburg the 17th suffered heavy losses in the assault on the famous stone wall, "For one entire day, (December 14) the men of the 17th lay flat on their faces eighty yards in front of the famous stone wall, behind which the enemy was posted in large numbers and any movement on their part was sure to draw the fire of rebel sharpshooters.

== Medal of Honor recipients ==
Spanish–American War

- Private George Berg, Company C
- Private Oscar Brookin, Company C
- Corporal Ulysses G. Buzzard, Company C
- Private Thomas J. Graves, Company C
- First Lieutenant Benjamin F. Hardaway
- Corporal Norman W. Ressler, Company D
- Second Lieutenant Charles DuVal Roberts
- Corporal Warren J. Shepherd, Company D
- Private Bruno Wende, Company C

World War II

- Private First Class Leonard C. Brostrom, Company F
- Private First Class John F. Thorson, Company G

Korean War

- Private Charles H. Barker, Company K
- Captain Raymond Harvey, Company C
- Corporal Einar H. Ingman Jr., Company E
- Private First Class Anthony T. Kahoʻohanohano, Company H
- Corporal William F. Lyell, Company F
- Corporal Fred B. McGee, Company K, awarded on 3 January 2025
- Private First Class Joseph C. Rodriguez, Company F
- First Lieutenant Richard Thomas Shea, Company A

== Lineage ==
- Constituted 3 May 1861 in the Regular Army as the 1st Battalion, 17th Infantry
- Organized 6 July 1861 at Fort Preble, Maine
- Reorganized and redesignated 13 December 1866 as the 17th Infantry
- Consolidated 1 June 1869 with the 44th Infantry, Veteran Reserve Corps (constituted 21 September 1866), and consolidated unit designated as the 17th Infantry
- Assigned 5 July 1918 to the 11th Division
- (2d and 3d Battalions inactivated 1 October 1921 at Fort McIntosh, Texas; activated 24 June 1922 at Fort Crook, Nebraska)
- Relieved 24 March 1923 from assignment to the 11th Division and assigned to the 7th Division
- Relieved 15 August 1927 from assignment to the 7th Division and assigned to the 6th Division
- (2d Battalion inactivated 31 October 1929 at Fort Des Moines, Iowa)
- Relieved 1 October 1933 from assignment to the 6th Division and assigned to the 7th Division (later redesignated as the 7th Infantry Division)
- (2d Battalion activated 1 July 1940 at Camp Ord, California)
- Relieved 1 July 1957 from assignment to the 7th Infantry Division and reorganized as a parent regiment under the Combat Arms Regimental System
- (4th Battalion activated 1984)
- 1986 - 1st and 2nd Battalions re-activated at Fort Richardson, AK as part of the 1st Brigade, 6th Infantry Division (Light).
- Withdrawn 16 November 1986 from the Combat Arms Regimental System and reorganized under the United States Army Regimental System
- (3rd and 4th Battalion inactivated 1993 at Ft. Ord, CA)
- Redesignated 1 October 2005 as the 17th Infantry Regiment
- (4th Battalion activated in Jan 2011 at Fort Bliss TX under 1st Brigade 1st Armored Division)
- 4th Battalion de-activated in June 2019 at Fort Bliss TX under 1st Brigade 1st Armored Division (reflagged as 2d Battalion 37th Armored Regiment)

== Campaign participation credit ==
- Civil War: Peninsula; Manassas; Antietam; Fredericksburg; Chancellorsville; Gettysburg; Wilderness; Spotsylvania; Cold Harbor; Petersburg; Virginia 1862; Virginia 1863
- Indian Wars: Little Big Horn; Pine Ridge; North Dakota 1872
- War with Spain: Santiago
- Philippine Insurrection: Manila; Malolos; San Isidro; Tarlac; Mindanao; Luzon 1899; Luzon 1900
- Mexican Expedition: Mexico 1916-1917
- World War II: Aleutian Islands (with arrowhead); Eastern Mandates (with arrowhead); Leyte; Ryukyus (with arrowhead); Occupation of Korea
- Korean War: UN Defensive; UN Offensive; CCF Intervention; First UN Counteroffensive; CCF Spring Offensive; UN Summer-Fall Offensive; Second Korean Winter; Korea, Summer-Fall 1952; Third Korean Winter; Korea, Summer 1953
- Vietnam: Counteroffensive, Phase VII; Consolidation I; Consolidation II; Cease-Fire
- Armed Forces Expeditions: Panama (with arrowhead)
- Operation Iraqi Freedom: August 2005 to December 2006 Mosul and Baghdad
- Operation Enduring Freedom: July 2009 to July 2010 Kandahar Province, Afghanistan; May 2012 to May 2013
- Operation Freedom's Sentinel: January 2017 to October 2017 Laghman and Nangarhar Provinces, Afghanistan
- War on Terrorism: Campaigns to be determined

== Unit awards ==
Ribbon	Award	Streamer embroidered
	Presidential Unit Citation (Army)	LEYTE
	Valorous Unit Award	NINEVEH PROVINCE AND BAGHDAD
	Meritorious Unit Commendation (Army)	AFGHANISTAN 2012-2013
	Philippine Presidential Unit Citation	17 OCTOBER 1944 TO 4 JULY 1945
	Republic of Korea Presidential Unit Citation	INCHON
	Republic of Korea Presidential Unit Citation	KOREA 1950-1953
	Republic of Korea Presidential Unit Citation	KOREA 1952-1953
	Republic of Korea Presidential Unit Citation	KOREA 1945-1948; 1953-1957

A Company, 1-17 IN, received the Presidential Unit Citation (Navy) for actions in support of Operation Helmand Spider in Marjah during Operation Enduring Freedom 09-11.

== See also ==
- List of United States Regular Army Civil War units
- Second Lieutenant Leighton W. Hazelhurst, was the second US military pilot to be killed in an airplane crash 11 June 1912.
- Philip Egner, bandmaster of the regiment during the Spanish–American War, later composed the West Point fight song, "On, Brave Old Army Team".
