= Ressler =

Ressler is a surname. Notable people with the surname include:

- Christian Ressler (born 1991), Austrian footballer
- Glenn Ressler (born 1943), American football player
- Larry Ressler (1848–1918), American baseball player
- Norman W. Ressler (1873–1914), American Medal of Honor recipient
- Oliver Ressler (born 1970), Austrian artist
- Robert Ressler (1937–2013), American criminal profiler
- Susan Ressler (born 1949), American photographer
- Tony Ressler (born 1959), American businessman
