= Ida Hinman =

American feminist, journalist, suffragette, and temperance activist

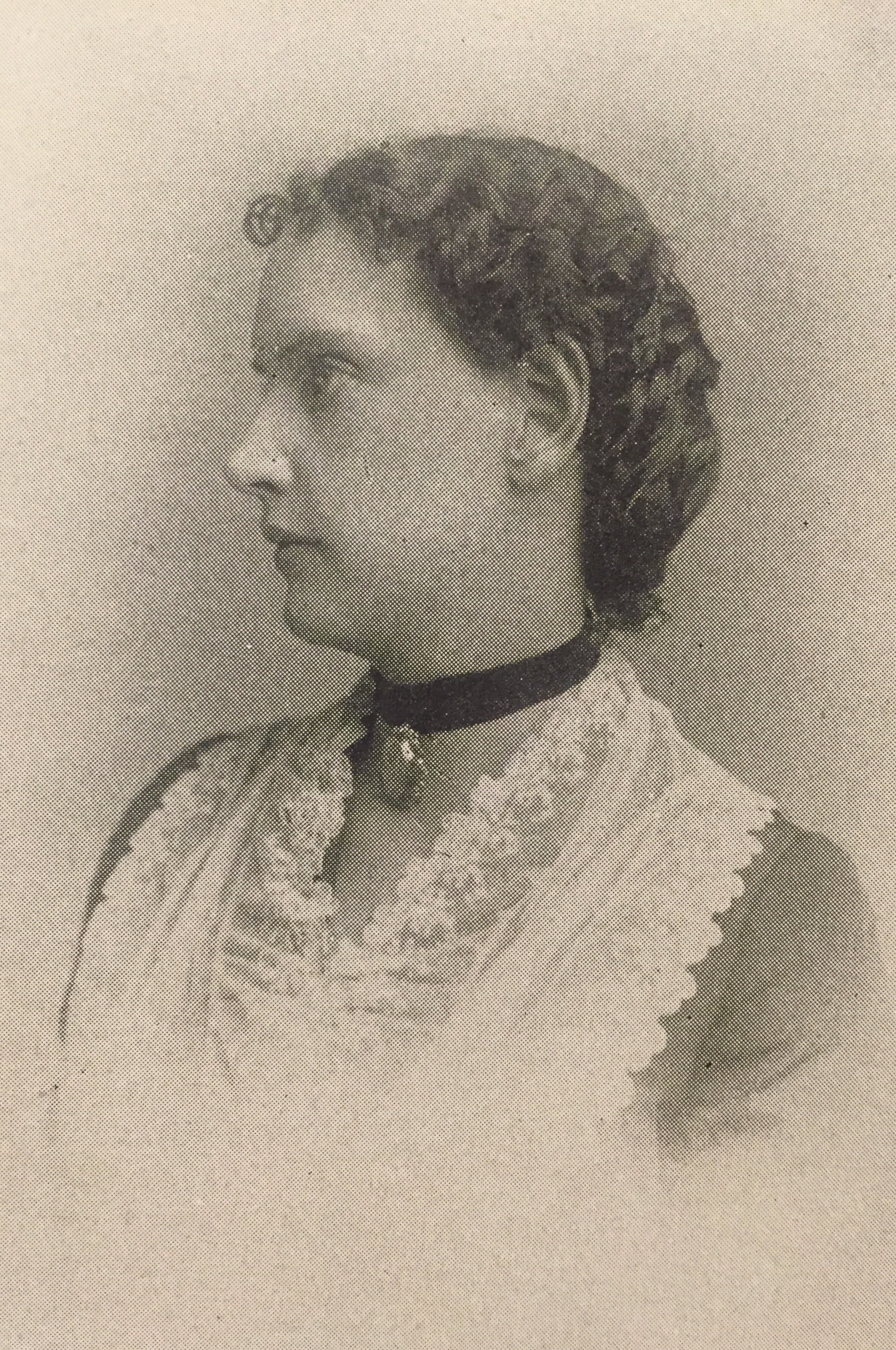
- Ida Hinman, c. 1890
- Born: 1854; Keokuk, Iowa, US
- Died: 1926 (aged 71–72); New York City, US
- Education: Iowa Wesleyan University; Columbian University; Northwestern University
- Occupation: Writer

Ida May Hinman (1854–1926) was an American feminist, journalist, suffragette, and temperance activist. She was the author of The Washington Sketch Book, one of the few Washington, D.C. guidebooks written by a woman at the end of the 19th century.

== Early life and family ==
Ida May Hinman was born in 1854 in Keokuk, Iowa. Sgt. Edward Hinman, the progenitor of the family in America, according to a late family tradition an officer of the bodyguard of Charles I of England, emigrated about 1650 and eventually settled in Stratford, Connecticut. He fathered two sons, of whom the oldest was Hinman's family's ancestor. Hinman's father, Botsford B. Hinman, was for years a successful merchant in Keokuk. Her mother was Ellen Elizabeth Fithian (1821–1909).

Hinman, the fourth child, was the first to live to maturity. She had two younger sisters, Ella (1856–1935) and Carrie (1859–1943); the latter married E.B. Maple of Hollywood, California.

She entered Iowa Wesleyan University, Mount Pleasant, in 1870, earning her M.S. in 1875. She was a member of the Ruthean Literary Society, of the Pi Beta Phi. She later obtained an A.M. from the Columbian University, Washington, D. C, in 1902. She did graduate work at Cambridge, Massachusetts, and Northwestern University, Evanston, Illinois.

== Career ==
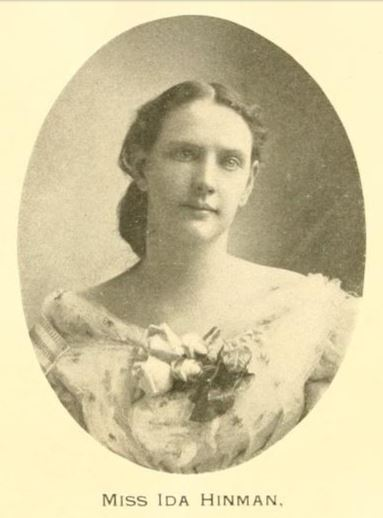
Ida Hinman, author of The Washington sketch book: a society souvenir

Hinman contributed for a number of years to many periodicals, including Harper's Magazine, leading religious journals and prominent newspapers. For five seasons she managed the Washington, D. C. correspondence for a large New York paper, handling a huge workload. She spent a part of the year 1891 in Europe, writing for a number of American periodicals. Among the questions that her editors desired her to investigate were the socialist movement in Germany, the principles of the sub-treasury system in England, and the impetus that the temperance movement received in Germany.

Hinman is the author of: Biography of Timothy B. Blackstone (Methodist Book Concern Press, 1917) and The Washington Sketch Book: A Society Souvenir (Hartman & Cadick, Printers, 1895). The latter is both a D.C. guidebook and a manual of the city's social life. It is one of the few Washington guidebooks written by a woman. The Washington Sketch Book was a well-known and received guide, and it was reprinted at least until 1917, when the 6th edition was released.

In Washington, D.C., Hinman worked with the National Reform Association and lobbied Congress on behalf of the Woman's Christian Temperance Union. In 1894 she lobbied Congress for a bill for a Sunday law.

She was a Methodist Episcopal revivalist and hymn writer. Some of her works are: "I Shall Know Mother's Face in Heaven", "The Song of Heaven", and "I Found Him Among the Living".

== Personal life ==
In Keokuk, Iowa, Hinman was a neighbor and friend of Mark Twain's mother, Jane Lampton Clemens, who was living with her other son, Orion Clemens, the first and only Secretary of Nevada Territory. Hinman lived with her mother and sister Ella at 27 Morgan Street. She spent summers in Ocean Grove, New Jersey and Asbury Park, New Jersey.

Hinman died in February 1926, in poverty; she was found in a furnished room in Brooklyn and was identified through a membership pin of the Daughters of the American Revolution. She is buried at Oakland Cemetery, Keokuk.
