= Charles P. Cantrell =

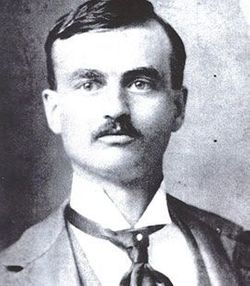
- Born: February 13, 1874; Smithville, Tennessee, U.S.
- Died: August 3, 1948 (aged 74); Nashville, Tennessee, U.S.
- Burial place: Nashville National Cemetery
- Military career
- Allegiance: United States
- Branch: United States Army
- Service years: 1898–1899
- Rank: Private
- Unit: 10th Infantry Regiment
- Conflicts: Spanish–American War
- Awards: Medal of Honor

Charles Patterson Cantrell (February 13, 1874 – August 3, 1948) was a private serving in the United States Army during the Spanish–American War who received the Medal of Honor for bravery.

== Biography ==
Cantrell was born February 13, 1874, in Smithville, Tennessee, though he has also been described as hailing from nearby Keltonburg, and joined the army from Nashville, Tennessee in May 1898. He was sent to fight in the Spanish–American War with Company F, 10th U.S. Infantry as a private where he received the Medal of Honor for his actions. He was discharged in May 1899 after one year of service.

Cantrell died August 3, 1948, and is buried at Nashville National Cemetery in Nashville, Tennessee.

== Medal of Honor citation ==
Rank and organization: Private, Company F, 10th U.S. Infantry. Place and date: At Santiago, Cuba, 1 July 1898. Entered service at: Nashville, Tenn. Born: 13 February 1874, Smithville, Tenn. Date of issue: 22 June 1899.

Citation:

Gallantly assisted in the rescue of the wounded from in front of the lines and under heavy fire from the enemy.

== See also ==
- List of Medal of Honor recipients for the Spanish–American War
