= Nashville National Cemetery =

Historic veterans cemetery in Davidson County, Tennessee

- U.S. National Register of Historic Places
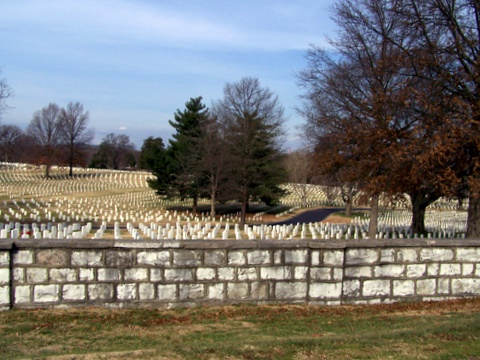
- Nashville National Cemetery
- Location: 1420 Gallatin Rd., S
- Nearest city: Nashville, Tennessee
- Coordinates: 36°14′30″N 86°43′40″W
- MPS: Civil War Era National Cemeteries MPS
- NRHP reference No.: 96001516
- Added to NRHP: December 20, 1996

Nashville National Cemetery is a United States National Cemetery located in Madison, a neighborhood of Nashville, in Davidson County, Tennessee. Administered by the United States Department of Veterans Affairs, it encompasses 64.5 acres (26.1 ha), and as of the end of 2005, had over 34,000 interments.

== History ==

The initial land for Nashville National Cemetery was acquired in July 1866. A tract of 45 acres was transferred to the United States from Morton B. Howell, Clerk and Master of the Chancery Court of Davidson County, in accordance with a decree of the court in the case of Anderson v. McRoberts & McKee, docket # 2153. The deed was recorded in January 1867, Davidson County deed book 38, p. 648. Another 17 acres was conveyed by the Clerk and Master, from the same case, in January 1867 and recorded in Davidson County deed book 38, p. 650. In October 1879 a small tract was deeded from J. Watts Judson and recorded in Davidson County deed book 63, p. 360.

The original interments were transferred from the Nashville City Cemetery, veteran hospital cemeteries around the region, as well as battlefield cemeteries, such as those from the Battle of Franklin. There are over four thousand unknowns buried in Nashville National Cemetery.

Nashville National Cemetery was listed in the National Register of Historic Places in 1996.

== Notable interments ==
- Medal of Honor recipients
  - Private Charles P. Cantrell, for action during the Spanish–American War
  - Private John Carr, for action during the Indian Wars
  - Corporal William Franklin Lyell, for action during Korean War
- Others
  - Chaplain Erastus M. Cravath, one of the founders of Fisk University
  - Johnny Dollar, country and rockabilly singer-songwriter
  - Eddie Feigner, softball pitcher and entertainer
  - Howard C. Gentry, head football coach of Tennessee A&I State College
  - Augustus Herman Pettibone, U.S. Congressman
  - Barry A. Sadler, Vietnam War veteran, and writer of the song Ballad of the Green Berets.
  - Bob Schultz, American baseball player
  - Jimmy Sweeney, Nashville-based singer-songwriter
  - Teddy & Doyle Wilburn, brothers and country music stars
