= Fred B. McGee =

Medal of Honor recipient (1930–1951)

- Born: 30 May 1930
- Died: 3 January 2020 (aged 89)
- Military career
- Allegiance: United States
- Branch: United States Army
- Service years: 1951–1952
- Rank: Corporal
- Units: Company K, 3rd Battalion, 17th Infantry Regiment, 7th Infantry Division
- Conflicts: Korean War
- Awards: Medal of Honor; Purple Heart

Fred B. McGee (30 May 1930 – 3 January 2020) was a United States Army soldier of African American descent who was posthumously awarded the Medal of Honor on 3 January 2025 for his actions on 16 June 1952 during the Korean War.

== Early life ==
Fred B. McGee was born on 30 May 1930, to Spanish and Perrie McGee in Steubenville, Ohio. He was the sixth of eight children — six boys, two girls.

== Military career ==
McGee enlisted in the United States Army in May 1951 and was assigned to Company K, 3rd Battalion, 17th Infantry Regiment, in South Korea.

McGee was originally awarded the Silver Star, which was upgraded to the Medal of Honor on 3 January 2025.

== Medal of Honor citation ==
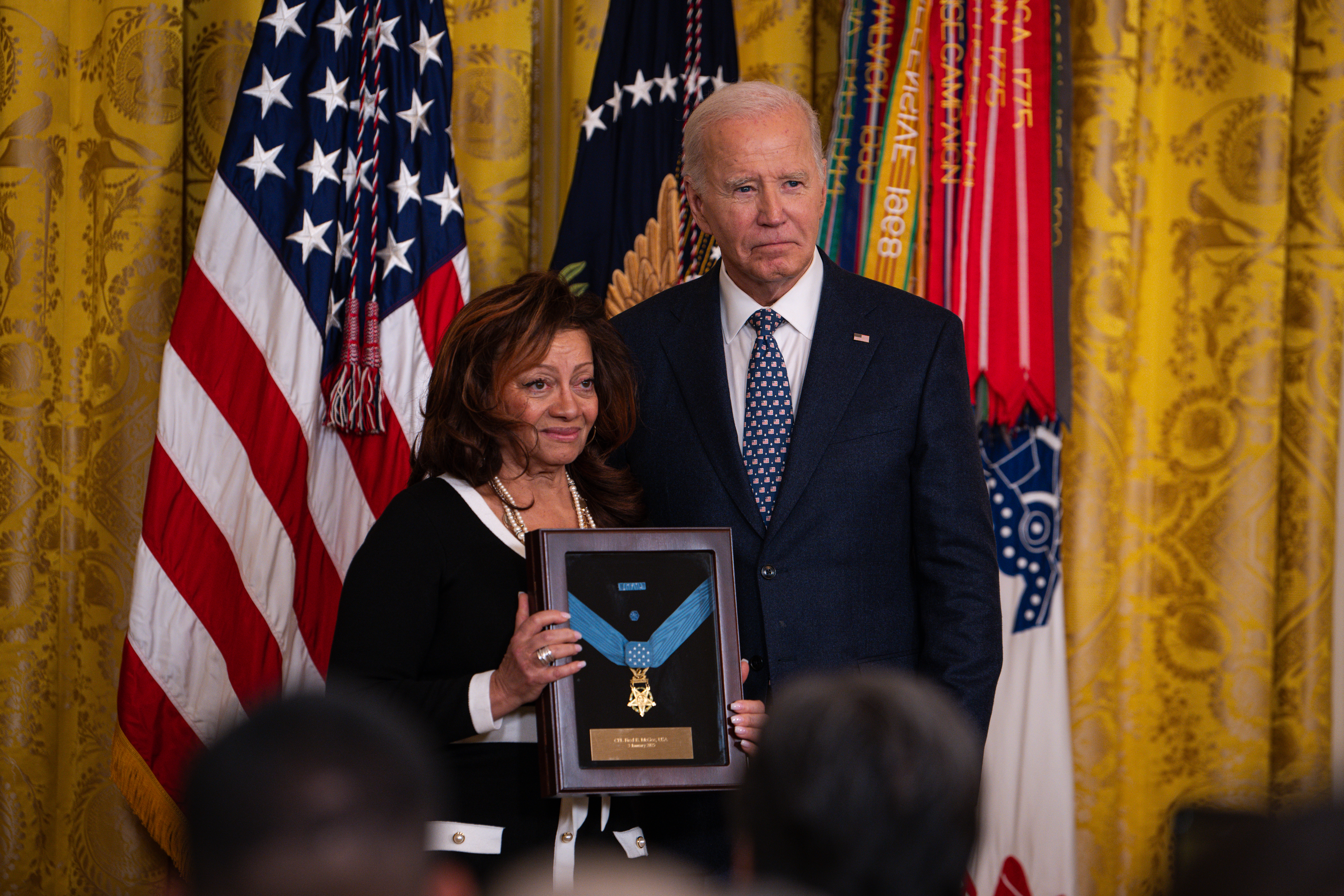
President Joe Biden with Victoria F. Secrest after presenting her the Medal of Honor for her father, former U.S. Army Cpl. Fred B. McGee

The President of the United States of America, in the name of Congress, takes pride in presenting the Medal of Honor (Posthumously) to Corporal Fred B. McGee, United States Army. Corporal McGee distinguished himself by gallantry in action near Tang-Wan-Ni, Korea, on June 16, 1952, in an assault on enemy fortified positions. As gunner on a light machine gun in a weapons squad, Corporal McGee delivered a heavy volume of supporting fire from an exposed position despite intense enemy machine-gun and mortar fire directly on his location. Though forced to move his gun several times, he continued to support the assault and give covering fire to the assault elements of his platoon. When his squad leader was wounded, together with several other members of his squad, he assumed command and moved the squad even farther forward to a more exposed position in order to deliver neutralizing fire on an enemy machine gun sweeping the other assault platoon with deadly flanking fire. When his machine gunner was mortally wounded, he again took over the gun. On order, he directed his squad to withdraw and voluntarily remained behind to help evacuate the wounded and dead. Though wounded in the face, he heroically exposed himself by standing straight up in intense enemy machine-gun and mortar fire while attempting to evacuate the body of the company runner. Forced to abandon the body, he aided a wounded man to be moved to the rear and safely through a huge volume of enemy mortar and artillery fire. The gallantry displayed by Corporal McGee reflects great credit upon himself and is in keeping with the highest traditions of the military service.

== Awards and Decorations ==
Corporal McGee was awarded the following awards for his service

Badge	Combat Infantryman Badge		
1st row	Medal of Honor Upgraded from Silver Star, 2025		Purple Heart
2nd row	Army Commendation Medal	Army Good Conduct Medal	National Defense Service Medal
3rd row	Korean Service Medal with 2 Campaign stars	United Nations Service Medal Korea	Korean War Service Medal Retroactively Awarded, 2003
Unit Awards	Korean Presidential Unit Citation		

== See also ==
- List of Korean War Medal of Honor recipients
