= Eddie Feigner =

American softball player (1925–2007)

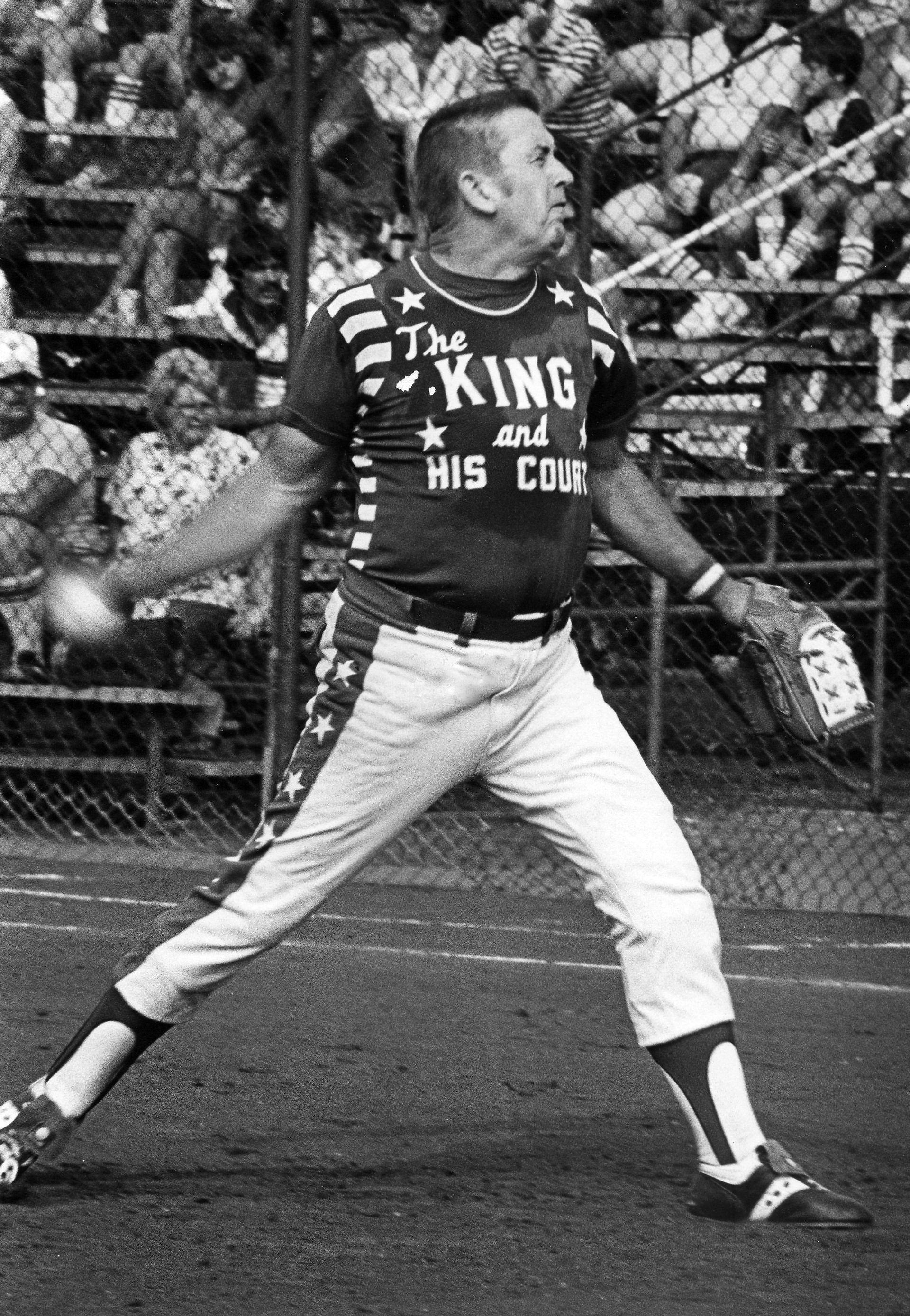
- Eddie Feigner in the early 1980s
- Born: Myrle Vernon King; March 28, 1925; Walla Walla, Washington, U.S.
- Died: February 9, 2007 (aged 81); Huntsville, Alabama, U.S.
- Burial place: Nashville National Cemetery, Madison, Tennessee, U.S.
- Occupation: Softball player
- Years active: 1940s–2000
- Known for: The King and His Court; Struck out six MLB superstars in a row (1967)

Edward W. "The King" Feigner (/ˈfeɪnər/, FAY-nər; March 28, 1925 – February 9, 2007) was an American softball pitcher and entertainer.

== Early life ==
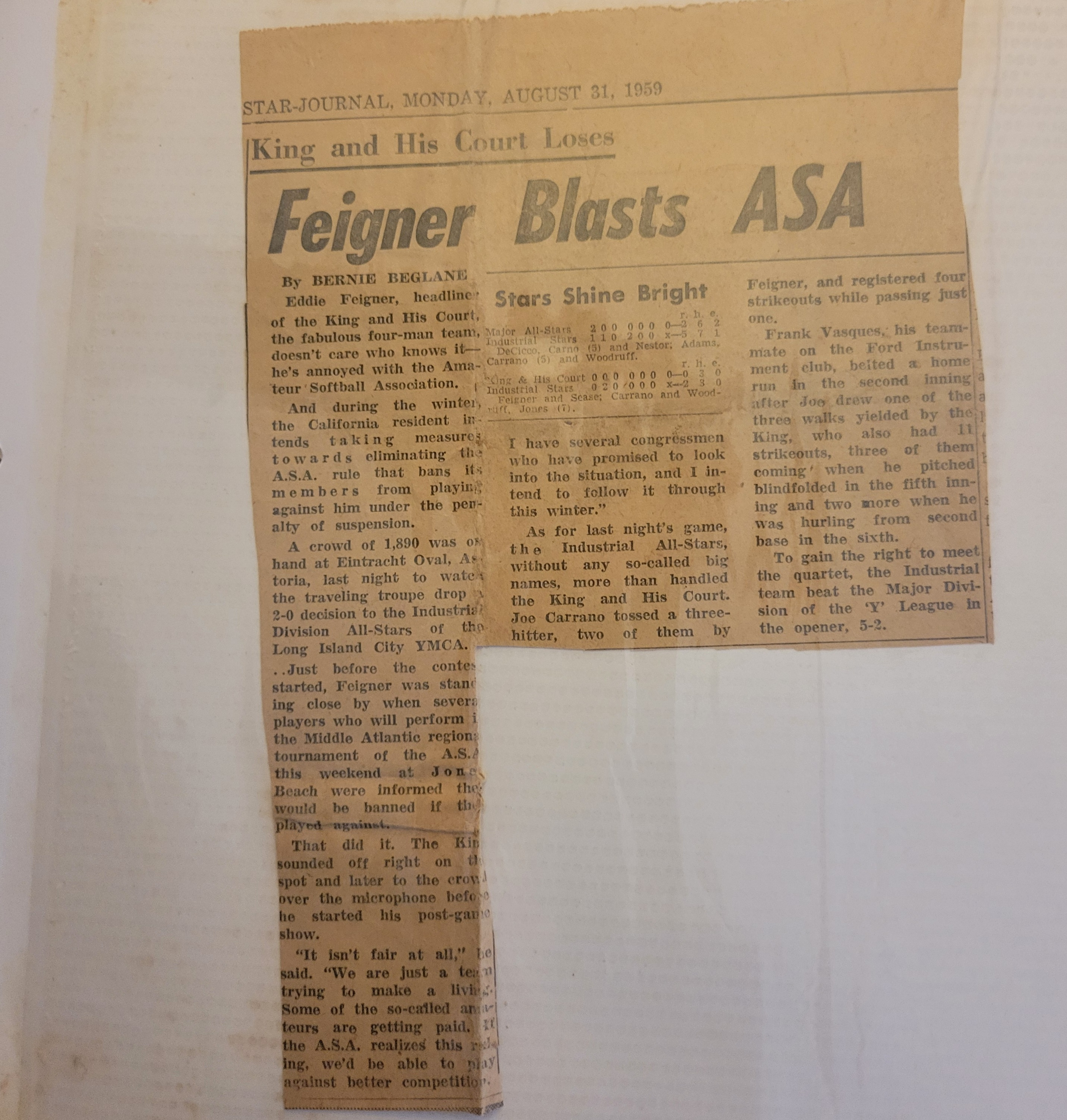
August 1959 article from the Long Island Star Journal about Frank Vasques hitting a home run off Feigner.

Born Myrle Vernon King in Walla Walla, Washington, he played softball for much of his early life, and turned his attention to the sport full-time following an enlistment in the U.S. Marine Corps. He first assembled his four-man touring team, known as "The King and His Court", in 1946 and took on all comers, first in the Pacific Northwest and then around the country. The team, which fielded only a pitcher (Feigner), catcher, first baseman, and shortstop, was known for performing tricks that entertained the audience.

== Career ==
The King and His Court would play over ten thousand softball games in a hundred countries from the late 1940s to the beginning of the 21st century and achieved a reputation and fame similar to that of the Harlem Globetrotters. Feigner's meticulous records claim 9,743 victories, 141,517 strikeouts, 930 no-hitters and 238 perfect games. He also only allowed three home runs in his whole career: one to Frank Vasques at Eintracht Oval in Astoria, Queens, New York, one to Bruce Bomers of Grandville, Michigan, and one to Thomas Leroy Barris in Rockford, Illinois, in 1957, while playing the R.I.A.A. All Stars at Beyer Stadium. The Washington Post described him as "the greatest softball pitcher who ever lived." In the 1950s and 60s, Feigner could pitch a softball faster than any league pitcher, with some pitches reaching speeds exceeding 100 MPH.

Despite his substantial record, Feigner said that while his team was known for taking on local softball teams and often winning by considerable margins, the intent of the King and His Court was to entertain audiences, never to embarrass opposing players. "When a man steps up to the plate, we have nothing but respect for him," he was noted for oft quoting.

When asked why his team only had four members, Feigner answered he had been told no team could take on his pitching so he should reduce the roster to simply himself. Feigner accepted the dare and originally wanted a two-man team of himself and catcher, but increased it to three in case an opposing player got a hit. He then added a fourth player when he realized that if all three of his team were on base, no one would be up to bat.

In honor of Feigner's time in the Marines, the King and His Court often played against military personnel, often at venues such as United States Army bases or the decks of aircraft carriers. They were also known for donating considerable amounts of ticket profits to charity, and following Operation Desert Storm, had put veteran support as the chief charity they played for.

Feigner appeared on the CBS television program, I've Got a Secret, on the July 6, 1960 episode. His secret was, “I pitched 89 games in 78 days…I’ve pitched 128 ‘perfect’ games…I’ve pitched 409 no-hit games…I’ve pitched 734 shut-out games…I once struck out 18 men and won a game – blindfolded”.

On February 18, 1967, Feigner appeared in a celebrity charity softball game against many Major League Baseball (MLB) players. In the game, Feigner struck out Willie Mays, Willie McCovey, Brooks Robinson, Roberto Clemente, Maury Wills, and Harmon Killebrew all in a row.

Feigner retired from pitching after suffering a stroke in 2000 but continued to tour with his team, acting as emcee and telling stories while the team played. The team was satirized on a 2006 episode of the Fox sitcom King of the Hill entitled "You Gotta Believe (In Moderation)" by a team called The Ace of Diamonds and His Jewels.

== Death and legacy ==
Feigner died on February 9, 2007 in Huntsville, Alabama. The King's burial took place on October 21, 2022, at the Nashville National Cemetery.

Feigner was inducted into the Baseball Reliquary's Shrine of the Eternals in 2013.
