= USNS Private John F. Thorson =

American coastal cargo ship

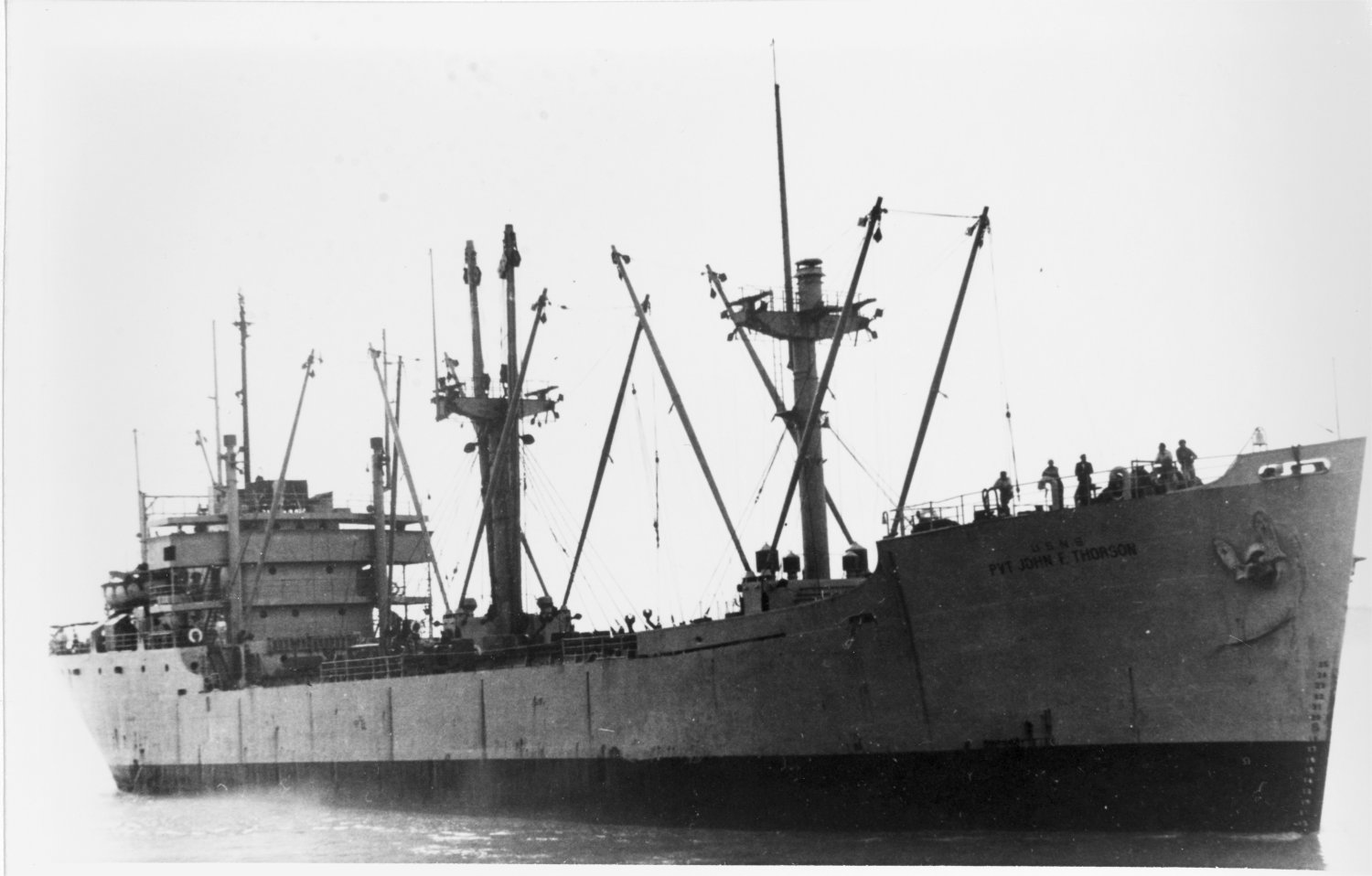
- Pvt. John F. Thorson underway, circa 1954

History

United States
- Name: Becket Bend
- Namesake: Becket bend
- Ordered: as type (C1-M-AV1) hull, MC hull 2486
- Builder: Southeastern Shipbuilding Corporation, Savannah, Georgia
- Yard number: AV2
- Laid down: 8 January 1945
- Launched: 26 February 1945
- Sponsored by: Mrs. L. S. deSevilla
- Commissioned: delivered to the Maritime Commission (MARCOM) prior to commissioning, 6 July 1945
- Identification: Hull symbol: AK-247 (never received number)
- Fate: Transferred to the War Shipping Administration (WSA), 23 July 1946

United States
- Name: Becket Bend; Private John F. Thorson
- Namesake: John F. Thorson, awarded Medal of Honor during WWII
- Owner: WSA
- Operator: US Army
- Acquired: 25 July 1946
- In service: 25 July 1946
- Out of service: 1 March 1950
- Renamed: 31 October 1947
- Fate: Transferred to the US Navy, 1 March 1950

United States
- Name: Private John F. Thorson
- Owner: US Navy
- Operator: Military Sea Transportation Service (MSTS)
- Acquired: 1 March 1950
- In service: 1 March 1950
- Out of service: 1954
- Stricken: 1 October 1958
- Identification: Hull symbol: T-AK-247
- Fate: Transferred to the Maritime Administration (MARAD), 29 August 1960

United States
- Name: Private John F. Thorson
- Owner: MARAD
- Acquired: 29 August 1960
- Fate: Sold for scrapping, 29 August 1960

General characteristics
- Class & type: Alamosa-class cargo ship
- Type: C1-M-AV1
- Tonnage: 5,032 long tons deadweight (DWT)
- Displacement: 2,382 long tons (2,420 t) (standard); 7,450 long tons (7,570 t) (full load)
- Length: 388 ft 8 in (118.47 m)
- Beam: 50 ft (15 m)
- Draft: 21 ft 1 in (6.43 m)
- Installed power: 1 × Nordberg, TSM 6 diesel engine; 1,750 shp (1,300 kW)
- Propulsion: 1 × propeller
- Speed: 11.5 kn (21.3 km/h; 13.2 mph)
- Capacity: 3,945 t (3,883 long tons) DWT; 9,830 cu ft (278 m^{3}) (refrigerated); 227,730 cu ft (6,449 m^{3}) (non-refrigerated)
- Complement: 15 Officers; 70 Enlisted
- Armament: 1 × 3 in (76 mm)/50 caliber dual purpose gun (DP); 6 × 20 mm (0.8 in) Oerlikon anti-aircraft (AA) cannons

USNS Private John F. Thorson (T-AK-247) was a US Maritime Administration (MARCOM) C1-M-AV1 type coastal cargo ship, originally planned as an Alamosa-class cargo ship. Constructed as Becket Bend for MARCOM, completed in August 1945 and placed in operation by the War Shipping Administration. However, the war ended, and she was transferred to the US Army as USAT Private John F. Thorson who kept her in service until transferred to the US Navy in 1950. She was struck in 1960, ending her military career.

== Construction ==
Becket Bend was laid down under MARCOM contract, MC hull 2486, by the Southeastern Shipbuilding Corporation, Savannah, Georgia on 8 January 1945; launched 26 February 1945; sponsored by Mrs. L. S. deSevilla; and delivered via MARCOM to Moore–McCormack Lines, Inc., 6 July 1945.

As Becket Bend, the cargo ship was operated by Moore–McCormack under General Agency Agreement (GAA). Title for the ship was transferred from the War Shipping Administration to the Army 23 July 1954 and the actual transfer to custody took place two days later at New Orleans, Louisiana.

== US Army service ==
Renamed Private John F. Thorson 31 October 1947, she operated as an Army Transportation Service ship until transferred to the Navy 1 March 1950.

== US Navy service ==
Placed in service as T–AK–247, she was assigned to the Military Sea Transportation Service (MSTS) and operated from Gulf ports until 1954. Transferred to the Atlantic Reserve Fleet, Charleston Group, she decommissioned 2 August 1954 and was struck from the Navy List 1 October 1958.

== Final inactivation ==
Private John F. Thorson remained at Charleston, South Carolina until transferred to the Maritime Administration (MARAD) 29 August 1960. The same day she was sold to Hugo New Steel Products, New York City, for scrap.

== Notes ==
Citations

== Bibliography ==
Online resources

- "Private John F. Thorson". Dictionary of American Naval Fighting Ships. Naval History and Heritage Command. 24 August 2015. This article incorporates text from this source, which is in the public domain.
- "C1 Cargo Ships". www.ShipbuildingHistory.com. 28 August 2009.
- "USNS Pvt John F. Thorson (T-AK-247)". NavSource. 23 October 2015.
