= James Durrell Greene =

American inventor and soldier (1828–1902)

James Durell Greene
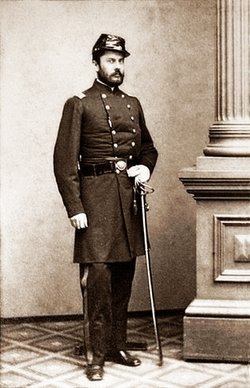
- Born: May 13, 1828; Lynn, Massachusetts, US
- Died: March 21, 1902 (aged 73); Ypsilanti, Michigan, US
- Military career
- Allegiance: United States of America; Union
- Branch: United States Army; Union Army
- Service years: 1861–1867
- Rank: Colonel; Brevet Brigadier General
- Commands: 17th United States Regulars, 2nd Brigade, 2nd Division, V Corps; 6th United States Regulars, 1st Brigade, 2nd Division, V Corps
- Conflicts: American Civil War: Battle of Gettysburg; New York Draft Riots

James Durell Greene (1828 – 1902) was the inventor of the Greene Rifle and a Brevet Brigadier General in the Union Army during the American Civil War.

== Biography ==
=== Early life ===
James Durell Greene was born on May 13, 1828, in Lynn, Massachusetts. Greene received excellent grades in school, and planned on attending West Point, but after his older brother who was attending the Academy died, his mother forbade it. Greene attended Harvard University.

=== Greene Rifle ===
Greene, college educated and obsessed with the military and technology, designed and patented many rifles. He modeled the Greene Rifle after Dreyse needle gun, which was the only bolt-action rifle to see combat use during the American Civil War. Greene also designed a similar weapon for the cavalry, the Greene Carbine. These were somewhat ineffective for cavalry use, because the primer would often fall out. In total, 900 of the Greene Rifles saw service by the US Government. Confederate military also issued this rifle to their infantry.

The Greene early bolt-action rifle contract was shipped to Russia and Egypt, but the estimated quantity is unknown.

=== Service in the American Civil War ===
On 23 July 1860, Greene joined the 5th Massachusetts Militia Regiment, being its Lieutenant Colonel when the civil war began. On June 26, 1861, he was transferred to the 17th US Infantry Regiment. He was stationed at Ft. Preble, while the rest of his regiment fought in early battles in the East. In late June 1863, Greene finally took command of the 17th Infantry. During the Battle of Gettysburg, Greene commanded the unit during heavy fighting in the Wheatfield, where the regiment lost 25 killed and 125 wounded. A monument to the 17th Infantry Regiment, inscribed with Greene's name, was erected on the site. Following the Battle of Chickamauga, on September 20, 1863, Greene was promoted to full colonel and transferred to the 6th US Infantry. On 13 April 1865, Colonel James D. Greene was promoted to Brevet Brigadier General. Greene resigned his commission on 25 June 1867, after nearly 7 years of service.

=== Later life ===
After resigning his commission in 1867, Greene continued inventing service rifles. Greene became a member of Grand Army of the Republic Post #11 in Charlestown, Massachusetts. On March 21, 1902, Greene died and was buried in Ypsilanti, Michigan.

== See also ==
- List of American Civil War brevet generals (Union)
