= William F. Lyell =

United States Army Medal of Honor recipient

- Born: February 14, 1929; Hickman County, Tennessee, U.S.
- Died: August 31, 1951 (aged 22) near Chup'a-ri, Korea
- Burial place: Nashville National Cemetery, Madison, Tennessee
- Military career
- Allegiance: United States
- Branch: United States Army
- Service years: 1950–1951
- Rank: Corporal
- Units: Company F, 17th Infantry Regiment, 7th Infantry Division
- Conflicts: Korean War (DOW)
- Awards: Medal of Honor; Purple Heart

William Franklin Lyell (February 14, 1929 – August 31, 1951) was a soldier in the United States Army during the Korean War who was posthumously awarded the Medal of Honor for his actions on August 31, 1951.

Lyell joined the army from Old Hickory, Tennessee, in 1950.

== Medal of Honor citation ==
Rank and organization: Corporal, U.S. Army, Company F, 17th Infantry Regiment, 7th Infantry Division

Place and date: Near Chup'a-ri, Korea, August 31, 1951

Entered service at: Old Hickory, Tennessee Birth: Hickman County, Tennessee

G.O. No.: 4, January 9, 1953.

Citation:

Cpl. Lyell, a member of Company F, distinguished himself by conspicuous gallantry and outstanding courage above and beyond the call of duty in action against the enemy. When his platoon leader was killed, Cpl. Lyell assumed command and led his unit in an assault on strongly fortified enemy positions located on commanding terrain. When his platoon came under vicious, raking fire which halted the forward movement, Cpl. Lyell seized a 57mm. recoilless rifle and unhesitatingly moved ahead to a suitable firing position from which he delivered deadly accurate fire completely destroying an enemy bunker, killing its occupants. He then returned to his platoon and was resuming the assault when the unit was again subjected to intense hostile fire from 2 other bunkers. Disregarding his personal safety, armed with grenades he charged forward hurling grenades into 1 of the enemy emplacements, and although painfully wounded in this action he pressed on destroying the bunker and killing 6 of the foe. He then continued his attack against a third enemy position, throwing grenades as he ran forward, annihilating 4 enemy soldiers. He then led his platoon to the north slope of the hill where positions were occupied from which effective fire was delivered against the enemy in support of friendly troops moving up. Fearlessly exposing himself to enemy fire, he continuously moved about directing and encouraging his men until he was mortally wounded by enemy mortar fire. Cpl. Lyell's extraordinary heroism, indomitable courage, and aggressive leadership reflect great credit on himself and are in keeping with the highest traditions of the military service.

His remains were returned to the United States and interred at Nashville National Cemetery on December 10, 1951.

== Awards and Decorations ==

Badge	Combat Infantryman Badge		
1st row	Medal of Honor	Purple Heart	National Defense Service Medal
2nd row	Korean Service Medal with 1 Campaign star	United Nations Service Medal Korea	Korean War Service Medal Retroactively Awarded, 2003
Unit Awards	Korean Presidential Unit Citation		

7th Infantry Division Insignia

== See also ==
- List of Korean War Medal of Honor recipients
