= Thomas J. Graves =

- Born: September 29, 1866; Milton, Indiana, U.S.
- Died: January 27, 1944 (aged 77); Pershing, Indiana, U.S.
- Burial place: East Germantown Lutheran Cemetery Pershing, Indiana
- Military career
- Allegiance: United States of America
- Branch: United States Army
- Service years: 1898 - 1901
- Rank: Quartermaster Sergeant
- Unit: 17th Infantry Regiment
- Conflicts: Spanish–American War
- Awards: Medal of Honor

Thomas J. Graves (September 29, 1866 – January 27, 1944) was a private serving in the United States Army during the Spanish–American War who received the Medal of Honor for bravery.

== Biography ==
Graves was born September 29, 1866, in Milton, Indiana and joined the army from Columbus, Ohio in May 1898. He was sent to fight in the Spanish–American War with Company C, 17th U.S. Infantry as a private where he received the Medal of Honor for his actions. He was discharged in May 1901.

He died January 27, 1944, and is buried in Zion Lutheran Cemetery Pershing, Indiana.

== Medal of Honor citation ==
Rank and organization: Private, Company C, 17th U.S. Infantry. Place and date: At El Caney, Cuba, 1 July 1898. Entered service at: Millville, Ind. Birth: Milton, Ind. Date of issue: 22 June 1899.

Citation:

Gallantly assisted in the rescue of the wounded from in front of the lines and under heavy fire from the enemy.

== See also ==
- List of Medal of Honor recipients for the Spanish–American War
