= Anthony T. Kahoʻohanohano =

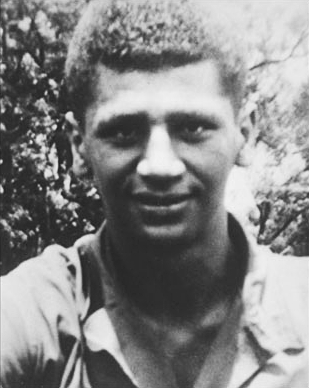
- Born: July 22, 1930; Maui, Hawaii, U.S.
- Died: September 1, 1951 (aged 21) near Chup'a-ri, Korea
- Burial place: Maui Veterans Cemetery, Makawao, Hawaii
- Military career
- Allegiance: United States
- Branch: United States Army
- Service years: 1950–1951
- Rank: Private First Class
- Service number: 29040479
- Units: 17th Infantry Regiment, 7th Infantry Division
- Conflicts: Korean War †
- Awards: Medal of Honor; Purple Heart

Anthony Thomas Kahoʻohanohano (July 22, 1930 – September 1, 1951) was a United States Army soldier who was killed in action on September 1, 1951, during the Korean War. He became a recipient of the United States military's highest decoration for valor, the Medal of Honor.

== Early life and family ==
A native of Maui, Hawaii, Kahoʻohanohano was the son of a police officer and one of seven siblings, six brothers and one sister. He lived in Wailuku and played football and basketball at St. Anthony's School for Boys (now known as St. Anthony High School) before graduating in 1949. All six of the Kahoʻohanohano brothers served in the U.S. military: Anthony and three others in the active duty army, one in the Marine Corps, and one in the National Guard.

== Korean War ==
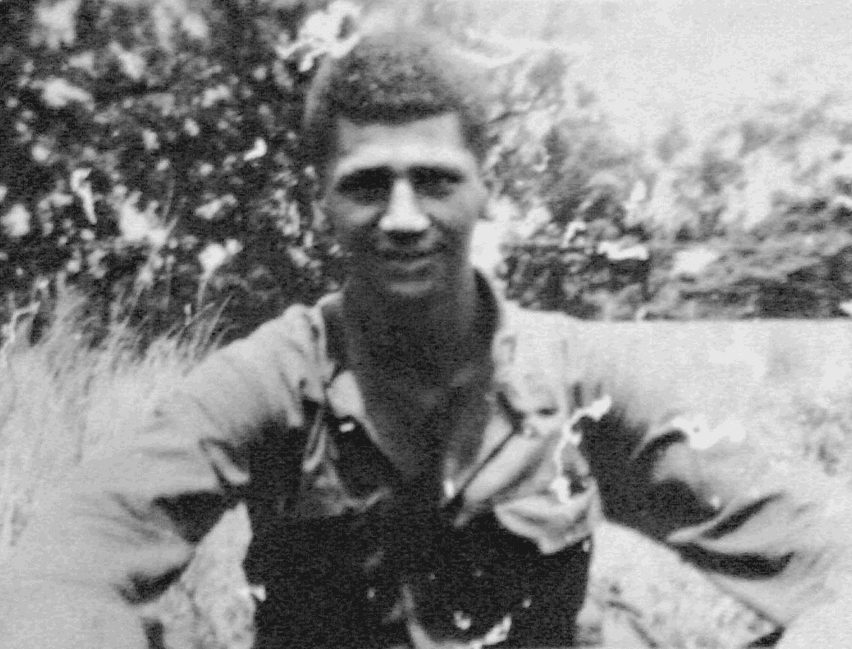

By September 1, 1951, Kahoʻohanohano was serving in Korea as a private first class with Company H, 2nd Battalion, 17th Infantry Regiment, 7th Infantry Division. On that day, near Chup'a-ri, he was in charge of a machine gun squad tasked with supporting another company. When a numerically superior enemy force launched an attack, he and his squad withdrew to a more defensible position. Although wounded in the shoulder, Kahoʻohanohano ordered his men to hold their ground while he gathered ammunition and returned to their original post. From that position, he single-handedly held off the enemy advance, fighting hand to hand with an entrenching tool after running out of ammunition, until he was killed. An American counter-attack later retook the position and found thirteen dead Chinese soldiers around Kahoʻohanohano's body. For these actions, he was posthumously awarded the U.S. Army's second-highest military decoration, the Distinguished Service Cross.

The medal was presented to his parents in 1952 on Maui.

== Medal of Honor recommendation ==
In the late 1990s, Kahoʻohanohano's brother, Abel Kahoʻohanohano, Sr., began an effort to have the Distinguished Service Cross upgraded to the Medal of Honor. Abel's son George took up the cause after his father's death. After an unsuccessful Medal of Honor nomination in 2001 by Representative Patsy Mink, which was rejected by the Army, the family enlisted the help of Senator Daniel Akaka. Akaka nominated Kahoʻohanohano for the medal again, and in March 2009 was informed by Secretary of the Army Pete Geren that, after "careful, personal consideration", the request had been approved. A provision making the upgrade official was included in the 2010 National Defense Authorization Act (H.R. 2647), signed into law by President Barack Obama on October 28, 2009.

The Medal of Honor was formally presented to the Kahoʻohanohano family at a White House ceremony on May 2, 2011.

== Military decorations and awards ==

Badge	Combat Infantryman Badge		
1st row	Medal of Honor Retroactively Awarded, 2011	Purple Heart	National Defense Service Medal
2nd row	Korean Service Medal with 1 Campaign star	United Nations Service Medal Korea	Korean War Service Medal Retroactively Awarded, 2003
Unit awards	Korean Presidential Unit Citation		

== Medal of Honor citation ==
His Medal of Honor citation reads:

The President of the United States in the name of The Congress takes pride in presenting the MEDAL OF HONOR posthumously to

PRIVATE FIRST CLASS ANTHONY T. KAHO'OHANOHANO
UNITED STATES ARMY

CITATION:

For conspicuous gallantry and intrepidity at the risk of his life above and beyond the call of duty: Private First Class Anthony T. KAHO'OHANOHANO, Company H, 17th Infantry Regiment, 7th Infantry Division, distinguished himself by acts of gallantry and intrepidity above the call of duty in action against the enemy in the vicinity of Chupa-ri, Korea, on 1 September 1951. On that date, Private First Class KAHO'OHANOHANO was in charge of a machine-gun squad supporting the defensive positioning of Company F when a numerically superior enemy force launched a fierce attack. Because of the enemy's overwhelming numbers, friendly troops were forced to execute a limited withdrawal. As the men fell back, Private First Class KAHO'OHANOHANO ordered his squad to take up more defensible positions and provide covering fire for the withdrawing friendly force. Although having been wounded in the shoulder during the initial enemy assault, Private First Class KAHO'OHANOHANO gathered a supply of grenades and ammunition and returned to his original position to face the enemy alone. As the hostile troops concentrated their strength against his emplacement in an effort to overrun it, Private First Class KAHO'OHANOHANO fought fiercely and courageously, delivering deadly accurate fire into the ranks of the onrushing enemy. When his ammunition was depleted, he engaged the enemy in hand-to-hand combat until he was killed. Private First Class KAHO'OHANOHANO's heroic stand so inspired his comrades that they launched a counterattack that completely repulsed the enemy. Upon reaching Private First Class KAHO'OHANOHANO's emplacement, friendly troops discovered 11 enemy soldiers lying dead in front of the emplacement and two inside it, killed in hand-to-hand combat. Private First Class KAHO'OHANOHANO's extraordinary heroism and selfless devotion to duty are in keeping with the finest traditions of military service and reflect great credit upon himself, the 7th Infantry Division, and the United States Army.

== See also ==
- List of Korean War Medal of Honor recipients
