= Joseph C. Rodríguez =

United States Army Medal of Honor recipient

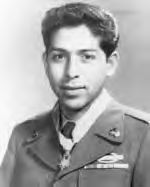
- Joseph C. Rodríguez, Medal of Honor recipient
- Born: November 14, 1928; San Bernardino, California, US
- Died: November 1, 2005 (aged 76); El Paso, Texas, US
- Burial place: Mountain View Cemetery San Bernardino, California
- Military career
- Allegiance: United States of America
- Branch: United States Army
- Service years: 1950–1980
- Rank: Colonel
- Units: Company F, 17th Infantry Regiment, 7th Infantry Division
- Conflicts: Korean War
- Awards: Medal of Honor; Purple Heart

Colonel Joseph Charles Rodríguez (November 14, 1928 – November 1, 2005) was a United States Army soldier who earned the Medal of Honor – the United States' highest military decoration for his actions near Munye-ri, Korea, during the Korean War.

== Early years ==
Rodríguez, a Mexican-American born in San Bernardino, California, was raised in the town of San Bernardino, where he also received his primary and secondary education. In October 1950, Rodriguez was drafted into the United States Army and ordered to report for induction in his hometown.

He received his basic training at Camp Carson in Colorado. There he was assigned to Company H, 2nd Battalion of the 196th Regimental Combat Team. Private Rodriguez completed his basic training in February 1951 and volunteered for duty in Korea. He was promoted to private first class (PFC) and sent overseas and assigned to Company F, 2nd Battalion, 17th Infantry Regiment, 7th Infantry Division.

== Korean War ==
On May 21, 1951, Company F was assigned the mission of occupying some high ground near the village of Munye-ri during the UN May–June 1951 counteroffensive. The high ground was held by firmly entrenched enemy forces. Three times Company F attacked the ridge, and three times they were thrown back.

PFC Joseph C. Rodríguez was the assistant squad leader of the 2nd Platoon. His squad's advance was halted by enemy hostile fire coming from five different emplacements. Rodriguez then took it upon himself to destroy these emplacements. He charged the emplacements and hurled grenades into each of the foxholes. Rodriguez destroyed the emplacements and killed 15 enemy soldiers. As a result, the enemy was routed and the strategic strongpoint secured. Rodriguez was promoted to the rank of sergeant and nominated for the Medal of Honor.

== Medal of Honor Citation ==
On February 5, 1952, President Harry S. Truman bestowed upon Sergeant Rodríguez the Medal of Honor in a ceremony held in the Rose Garden in the White House. The citation reads:

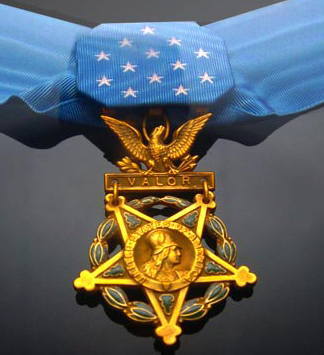

JOSEPH C. RODRÍGUEZ
Rank and organization: Sergeant (then Pfc.), U.S. Army, Company F, 17th Infantry Regiment, 7th Infantry Division.
Place and date: Near Munye-ri, Korea, May 21, 1951.
Entered service at: California
Born: November 14, 1928, San Bernardino, Calif.
G.O. No.: 22, February 5, 1952.

Citation:

Sgt. Rodríguez, distinguished himself by conspicuous gallantry and intrepidity at the risk of his life above and beyond the call of duty in action against an armed enemy of the United Nations. Sgt. Rodriguez, an assistant squad leader of the 2d Platoon, was participating in an attack against a fanatical hostile force occupying well-fortified positions on rugged commanding terrain, when his squad's advance was halted within approximately 60 yards by a withering barrage of automatic weapons and small-arms fire from 5 emplacements directly to the front and right and left flanks, together with grenades which the enemy rolled down the hill toward the advancing troops. Fully aware of the odds against him, Sgt. Rodriguez leaped to his feet, dashed 60 yards up the fire-swept slope, and, after lobbing grenades into the first foxhole with deadly accuracy, ran around the left flank, silenced an automatic weapon with 2 grenades and continued his whirlwind assault to the top of the peak, wiping out 2 more foxholes and then, reaching the right flank, he tossed grenades into the remaining emplacement, destroying the gun and annihilating its crew. Sgt. Rodriguez' intrepid actions exacted a toll of 15 enemy dead and, as a result of his incredible display of valor, the defense of the opposition was broken, and the enemy routed, and the strategic strongpoint secured. His unflinching courage under fire and inspirational devotion to duty reflect highest credit on himself and uphold the honored traditions of the military service.

== Later years ==
After the Korean War, Rodríguez decided to make the military his career. He was assigned to the administrative staff at the ORC headquarters in San Bernardino.

On April 23, 1952, Rodríguez and his fiancée Miss Rose Aranda were the invited guests on You Bet Your Life, a 1950s television game show hosted by Groucho Marx. The following is part of the conversation between Rodriguez and Marx in the show:

Groucho: If you don't win any money here tonight it won't be my fault, son! Well, Joe, that's the most amazing thing I ever heard. There's just one thing I'd like to know – when you were running through all that lead, what were you thinking about?

Joe: Well, I wasn't thinking – I was just mad, I guess.

Groucho: You wiped out a whole army just because you got mad? Joe...if I said anything here tonight that you resent, I was just being facetious.

Groucho: What are your plans for the future, Joe?

Joe: I hope to make a career in the Army.

Groucho: Well, I'm sure glad you're on our side. Rose, take good care of this fella. My advice is, don't ever make him mad – he's liable to wipe out Los Angeles! Well, you're a fine couple, and I'm sure you're going to have many happy, handsome, bright, and brave children.

In 1953, Rodríguez married Rose and together they had three children. He subsequently became a commissioned officer in the US Army Corps of Engineers, serving more than 30 years in the military, through four Latin American assignments, and unaccompanied tours in Korea and Vietnam. In 1980, Rodriguez retired from the Army with the rank of colonel.

Rodríguez was residing with his wife, Rose, in El Paso, Texas, at the time of his retirement. He spent the next ten years as Facilities Director at the University of Texas. He dedicated much of his time of his last fifteen years to national speech engagements addressing young people and soldiers, encouraging them to pursue their education.

Colonel Joseph C. Rodríguez died on November 1, 2005, in El Paso and was buried with full military honors at Mountain View Cemetery in San Bernardino, California. Rodriguez is survived by his wife Rose; his sons, Lieutenant General Charles G. Rodriguez and Lawrence R. Rodriguez; daughter, Karen Sharp; 11 grandchildren; ten sisters and two brothers.

== Awards and recognitions ==
Among Joseph C. Rodríguez's decorations and medals were the following:

Badge	Combat Infantryman Badge		
1st row	Medal of Honor		Legion of Merit with 2 Oak leaf clusters
2nd row	Purple Heart	Meritorious Service Medal	Air Medal
3rd row	Army Commendation Medal with 1 Oak leaf cluster	Army Good Conduct Medal	National Defense Service Medal with 1 Oak leaf cluster
4th row	Korean Service Medal with 3 Campaign stars	Vietnam Service Medal with 4 Campaign stars	Korea Defense Service Medal Retroactively Awarded, 2004
5th row	United Nations Service Medal Korea	Vietnam Campaign Medal	Korean War Service Medal Retroactively Awarded, 2003
Badge	Parachutist Badge		
Unit Awards	Meritorious Unit Commendation	Korean Presidential Unit Citation	RVN Gallantry Cross Unit Citation with Palm

7th Infantry Division Insignia

== See also ==
- List of Medal of Honor recipients
- List of Korean War Medal of Honor recipients
- Hispanic Medal of Honor recipients
