= Charles Barker (cricketer) =

English cricketer

Personal information
- Full name: Charles Frederick Barker
- Born: 5 July 1847; Hereford, England
- Died: 29 November 1891 (aged 44); Hereford, England
- Role: Batsman

Domestic team information
- Years: Team
- 1873/74: Canterbury
- Source: Cricinfo, 14 October 2020

Charles Frederick Barker (5 July 1847 – 29 November 1891) was an English cricketer. He played in two first-class matches in New Zealand for Canterbury during the 1873–74 season.

Born at Hereford in England in 1847, Barker's family moved to New Zealand when he was child and he was educated at Christ's College in Christchurch. Described as "a good bat, with great power of hitting" and a "fair field", he played club cricket for Kaiapoi, whom he captained, and Christchurch Cricket Club and was elected secretary and treasurer of the Canterbury match committee in December 1873. He had been selected as a replacement for an injured player in the Canterbury squad ahead of its match against Otago in January 1873, with The Press considering that he was good enough to have been selected in the initial squad of 18 players.

Barker did not play in the match, and made both of his representative appearances came during the 1873–74 season. He made scores of 13 and 30 on debut against Auckland at Hagley Oval in November 1873, before scoring 29 and two against Otago at South Dunedin Recreation Ground in January 1874. Although the Canterbury team which played Otago was considered weak, writing five years later The Globe considered that Barker was the "one good player" who was new in the side. The paper described him as "one of the most punishing batsmen we have seen", although it was critical of his fielding during the match. He was still playing for Christchurch in the mid 1880s, by that time being described by The Star as "an old cricketing identity".

Professionally Barker worked as a solicitor. He died at Hereford in 1891 aged 44.
