= Benjamin F. Hardaway =

US Army officer and Medal of Honor recipient (1865–1955)

Benjamin Franklin Hardaway
- Born: July 17, 1865; Benleyville, Kentucky, US
- Died: July 9, 1955 (aged 89)
- Burial place: Arlington National Cemetery
- Military career
- Allegiance: United States
- Branch: United States Army
- Service years: 1886–1919
- Rank: Colonel
- Unit: 17th Infantry Regiment
- Commands: 55th Infantry Regiment
- Conflicts: Spanish–American War
- Awards: Medal of Honor

Benjamin Franklin Hardaway (July 17, 1865 – July 9, 1955) was an officer serving in the United States Army during the Spanish–American War who received the Medal of Honor for bravery.

== Biography ==
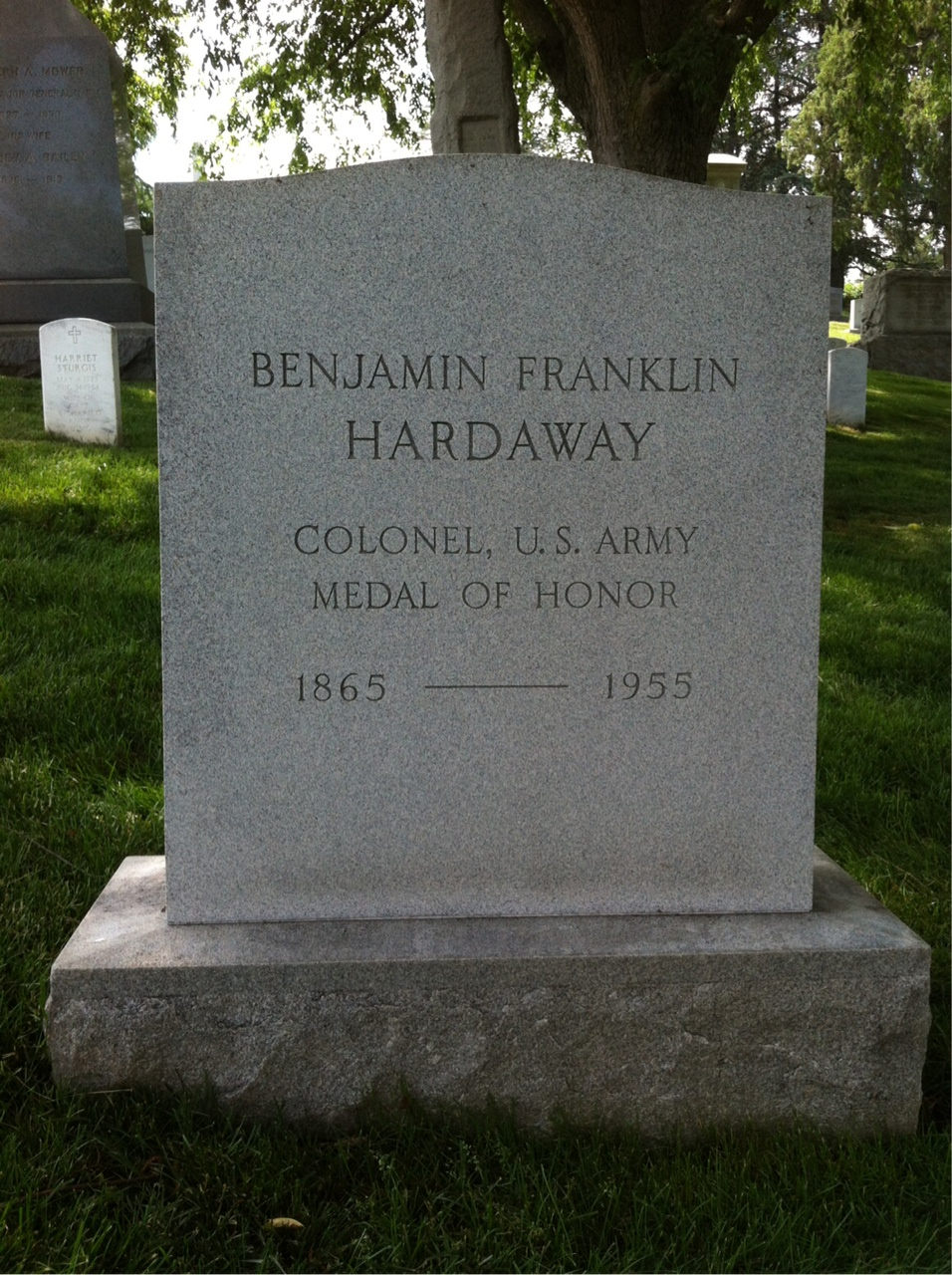
Grave at Arlington National Cemetery

Hardaway was born July 17, 1865, in Benleyville, Kentucky, and, after entering the army in April 1886, worked his way up to the rank of sergeant while in Company C, 17th U.S. Infantry. On July 31, 1891, he was promoted to the rank of second lieutenant and then to first lieutenant April 26, 1898 before being sent to fight in the Spanish–American War with the 17th U.S. Infantry. While his unit was fighting at El Caney, Cuba, July 1, 1898, he received the Medal of Honor for assisting in the rescue of wounded while under heavy fire from the enemy. He received his medal on June 21, 1899. He remained in the army after the war and was promoted to the rank of captain on February 2, 1901. He retired with the rank of colonel in February 1919.

Hardaway died July 9, 1955, and was buried at Arlington National Cemetery, in Arlington, Virginia.

== Medal of Honor citation ==
Rank and organization: First Lieutenant, 17th U.S. Infantry. Place and date: At El Caney, Cuba, 1 July 1898. Entered service at:______. Birth: Benleyville, Ky. Date of issue: 21 June 1899.

Citation

Gallantly assisted in the rescue of the wounded from in front of the lines and under heavy fire from the enemy.

== See also ==
- List of Medal of Honor recipients for the Spanish–American War
