= Ulysses G. Buzzard =

- Born: January 31, 1865; Armstrong County, Pennsylvania, US
- Died: August 2, 1939 (aged 74)
- Burial place: Veterans Cemetery community of Labangon, Cebu City, Philippines
- Military career
- Allegiance: United States of America
- Branch: United States Army
- Service years: 1888–1911
- Rank: Sergeant
- Unit: 17th Infantry Regiment
- Conflicts: Spanish–American War
- Awards: Medal of Honor

Ulysses G. Buzzard (January 31, 1865 – August 2, 1939) was an American soldier who served in the United States Army during the Spanish–American War and whose actions during that conflict led to him receiving the Medal of Honor for bravery.

== Biography ==
Ulysses Grant Buzzard was born January 31, 1865, in Armstrong County, Pennsylvania. He joined the army from Pittsburgh, Pennsylvania, in May 1888, and served with Company C, 17th U.S. Infantry in the Spanish–American War. He later served in the Philippines, and retired there in December 1911.

Buzzard died at age 74 and was buried at Cebu city veterans memorial park in Cebu City, the Philippines.

== Medal of Honor citation ==
Rank and organization: Corporal, Company C, 17th U.S. Infantry. Place and date: At El Caney, Cuba, 1 July 1898. Entered service at: ______. Birth: Armstrong, Pa. Date of issue: 24 June 1899.

Citation:

Gallantly assisted in the rescue of the wounded from in front of the lines and under heavy fire from the enemy.

== See also ==
- List of Medal of Honor recipients for the Spanish–American War
