= Richard Thomas Shea =

United States Army Medal of Honor recipient

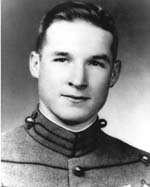
- Richard Shea, Medal of Honor recipient
- Born: January 3, 1927; Portsmouth, Virginia
- Died: July 8, 1953 (aged 26) near Sokkogae in Yeoncheon, South Korea
- Burial place: Olive Branch Cemetery; Portsmouth, Virginia
- Military career
- Allegiance: United States of America
- Branch: United States Army
- Service years: 1944–1953
- Rank: First Lieutenant
- Units: Company A 17th Infantry Regiment, 7th Infantry Division
- Conflicts: Korean War Second Battle of Pork Chop Hill †
- Awards: Medal of Honor; Purple Heart

Richard Thomas Shea, Jr. (January 3, 1927 – July 8, 1953) was a soldier in the United States Army in the Korean War. He was listed as missing in action on July 8, 1953, during the Second Battle of Pork Chop Hill, and was later declared killed in action. Lt. Shea received the Medal of Honor posthumously. In 1987, Shea was inducted into the Virginia Sports Hall of Fame.

== Early life ==
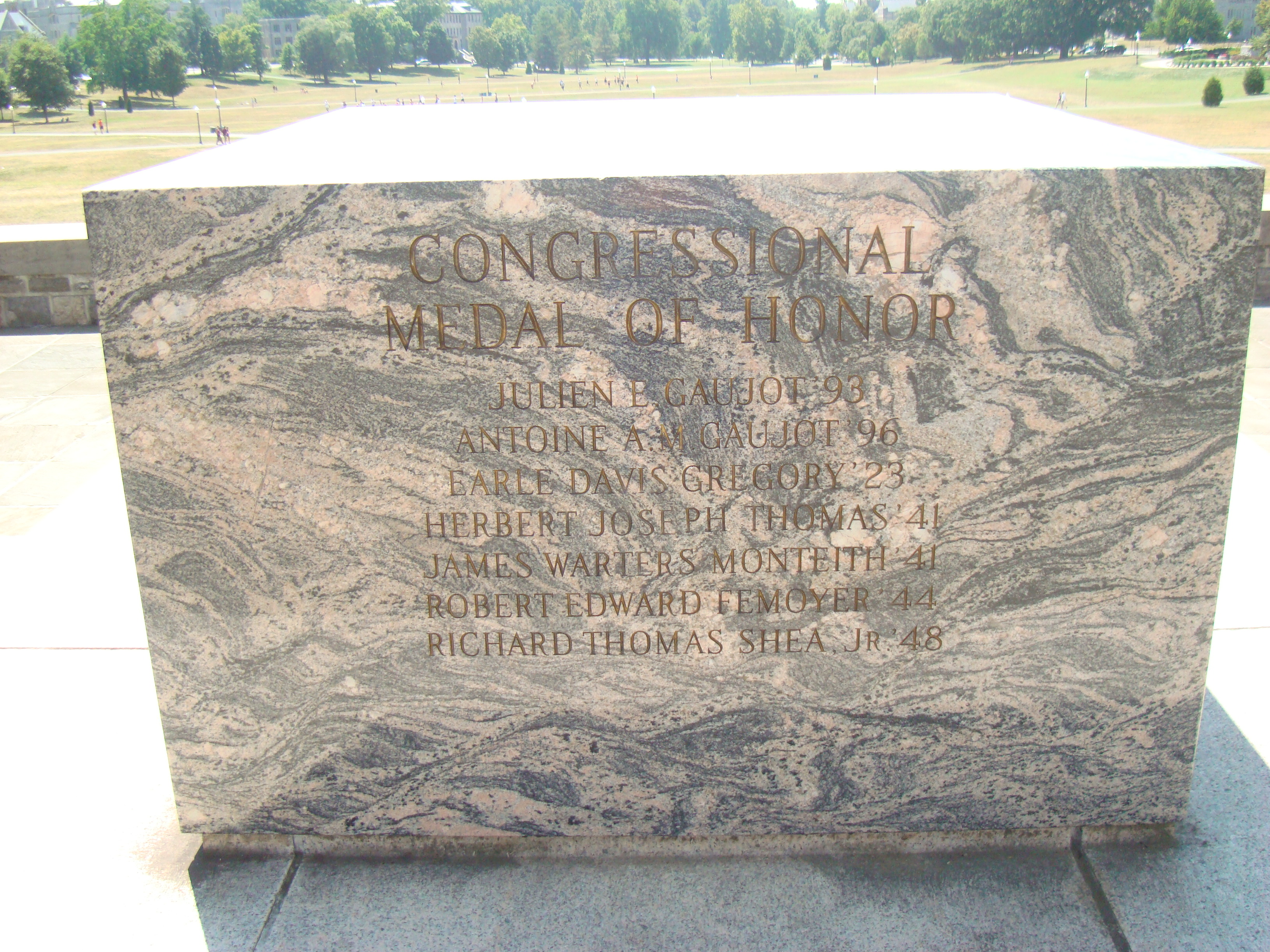
Shea's name on the Virginia Tech's MOH memorial stone.

A native of Norfolk County, Virginia, Shea graduated from Churchland High School. He first studied in uniform at Virginia Polytechnic Institute at the height of World War II, but left early to join the US Army in 1944. He served in the US Constabulary in post-war Europe, rising to the rank of staff Sergeant, before he entered West Point in 1948.

== Track star at West Point ==
Shea was an All-American in track and was said to have been the greatest track star to attend West Point. He ran his first competitive race at VPI. One of the West Point Black Knights' most celebrated distance runners, Dick Shea captured Heptagonal and IC4A individual cross country titles in three successive years (1949–51), helping Army to three straight team "Heps" titles during that time. The top performer on Army's dominant cross country team, Shea led the Black Knights to a 19–2 record during his West Point career, a mark that included three straight "shutouts" of arch-rival Navy. He set seven Academy records in indoor and outdoor track and field and established a meet record in the 2 miles (3.2 km) run at the prestigious Penn Relays in 1951. Shea repeated as the two-mile champ at both the Penn Relays and Heptagonal Championships in 1951 and 1952. His standards in the indoor 1 mile (1.6 km) run (4:10) and 2 miles (3.2 km) run (9:05.8) remained on Army's record books for more than a decade. Since 1952, only eight Army runners have achieved a better time in the mile, either indoors or outdoors. Today, Army's outdoor track and field complex bears his name.

Turning down the opportunity to attend the Olympic Games, after graduating in 1952, he joined his classmates in the Korean War.

== Medal of Honor recipient ==
Richard Shea received the Medal of Honor for actions on July 7 and 8, 1953 as an Army first lieutenant and acting company commander at Pork Chop Hill, near Sokkogae in Yeoncheon during the Korean War. Fighting outnumbered, he voluntarily proceeded to the area most threatened, organizing and leading a counterattack. In the ensuing bitter fighting, he killed two of the enemy with his trench knife. In over 18 hours of heavy fighting, he moved among the defenders of Pork Chop Hill organizing a successful defense. Leading a counterattack, he killed three enemy soldiers single-handedly. Wounded he refused evacuation. He was last seen alive fighting hand-to-hand while leading another desperate counterattack.

He left behind both a wife and an unborn son. His Medal of Honor was presented to his widow at the parade grounds of Fort Myer, Virginia, by Secretary of the Army Robert T. Stevens on May 16, 1955. He is buried at Olive Branch Cemetery in Portsmouth, Virginia.

VFW Post 9382 in Suffolk, Virginia, is named in his honor.

== Medal of Honor citation ==
Rank and organization: First Lieutenant, U.S. Army, Company A 17th Infantry Regiment, 7th Infantry Division

Place and date: Near Sokkogae, Korea, July 6 to 8, 1953.

Entered service at: Portsmouth, Va. Born: January 3, 1927, Portsmouth, Va.

G.O. No.: 38, June 8, 1955.

Citation:

1st Lt. Shea, executive officer, Company A, distinguished himself by conspicuous gallantry and indomitable courage above and beyond the call of duty in action against the enemy. On the night of 6 July, he was supervising the reinforcement of defensive positions when the enemy attacked with great numerical superiority. Voluntarily proceeding to the area most threatened, he organized and led a counterattack and, in the bitter fighting which ensued, closed with and killed 2 hostile soldiers with his trench knife. Calmly moving among the men, checking positions, steadying and urging the troops to hold firm, he fought side by side with them throughout the night. Despite heavy losses, the hostile force pressed the assault with determination, and at dawn made an all-out attempt to overrun friendly elements. Charging forward to meet the challenge, 1st Lt. Shea and his gallant men drove back the hostile troops. Elements of Company G joined the defense on the afternoon of 7 July, having lost key personnel through casualties. Immediately integrating these troops into his unit, 1st Lt. Shea rallied a group of 20 men and again charged the enemy. Although wounded in this action, he refused evacuation and continued to lead the counterattack. When the assaulting element was pinned down by heavy machine gun fire, he personally rushed the emplacement and, firing his carbine and lobbing grenades with deadly accuracy, neutralized the weapon and killed 3 of the enemy. With forceful leadership and by his heroic example, 1st Lt. Shea coordinated and directed a holding action throughout the night and the following morning. On 8 July, the enemy attacked again. Despite additional wounds, he launched a determined counterattack and was last seen in close hand-to-hand combat with the enemy. 1st Lt. Shea's inspirational leadership and unflinching courage set an illustrious example of valor to the men of his regiment, reflecting lasting glory upon himself and upholding the noble traditions of the military service.

== See also ==
- List of Medal of Honor recipients
- List of Korean War Medal of Honor recipients
