= John F. Thorson =

- Born: May 10, 1920; Armstrong, Iowa, US
- Died: October 28, 1944 (aged 24); Dagami, Leyte, the Philippines
- Burial place: Keokuk National Cemetery, Keokuk, Iowa
- Military career
- Allegiance: United States of America
- Branch: United States Army
- Service years: 1942 - 1944
- Rank: Private First Class
- Units: G Company, 2nd Battalion, 17th Infantry Regiment, 7th Infantry Division
- Conflicts: World War II: Philippines campaign; Battle of Leyte †
- Awards: Medal of Honor; Purple Heart

John F. Thorson (May 10, 1920 – October 28, 1944) was a United States Army infantry soldier who was killed in action on October 28, 1944, in World War II. He was a posthumous recipient of the United States military's highest decoration for valor—the Medal of Honor—for his heroic actions above and beyond the call of duty during the war.

== Biography ==
Thorson was the seventh of eight children born to Norwegian immigrants. He joined the U.S. Army from his birth city of Armstrong, Iowa in 1942, and by October 28, 1944, was serving as a private first class in Company G, 2nd Battalion, 17th Infantry Regiment, 7th Infantry Division. On that day, in Dagami, Leyte province, in the Philippines, Thorson was wounded while single-handedly attacking an enemy trench, then smothered an enemy-thrown hand grenade with his own body to protect his fellow soldiers from the blast, but was immediately killed. He was posthumously awarded the Medal of Honor nine months later, on July 19, 1945.

Thorson, aged 24 at his death, was buried in Keokuk National Cemetery, Keokuk, Iowa.

== Medal of Honor citation ==
Private First Class Thorson's official Medal of Honor citation reads:

He was an automatic rifleman on 28 October 1944, in the attack on Dagami Leyte, Philippine Islands. A heavily fortified enemy position consisting of pillboxes and supporting trenches held up the advance of his company. His platoon was ordered to out-flank and neutralize the strongpoint. Voluntarily moving well out in front of his group, Pvt. Thorson came upon an enemy fire trench defended by several hostile riflemen and, disregarding the intense fire directed at him, attacked single-handed. He was seriously wounded and fell about 6 yards from the trench. Just as the remaining 20 members of the platoon reached him, 1 of the enemy threw a grenade into their midst. Shouting a warning and making a final effort, Pvt. Thorson rolled onto the grenade and smothered the explosion with his body. He was instantly killed, but his magnificent courage and supreme self-sacrifice prevented the injury and possible death of his comrades, and remain with them as a lasting inspiration.

== Honored in ship naming ==
The United States Army ship USAT Private John F. Thorson which served in the Pacific Ocean at the end of World War II was named in his honor.

== See also ==
- List of Medal of Honor recipients
- List of Medal of Honor recipients for World War II
