= Keokuk National Cemetery =

Veterans cemetery in Lee County, Iowa

- U.S. National Register of Historic Places
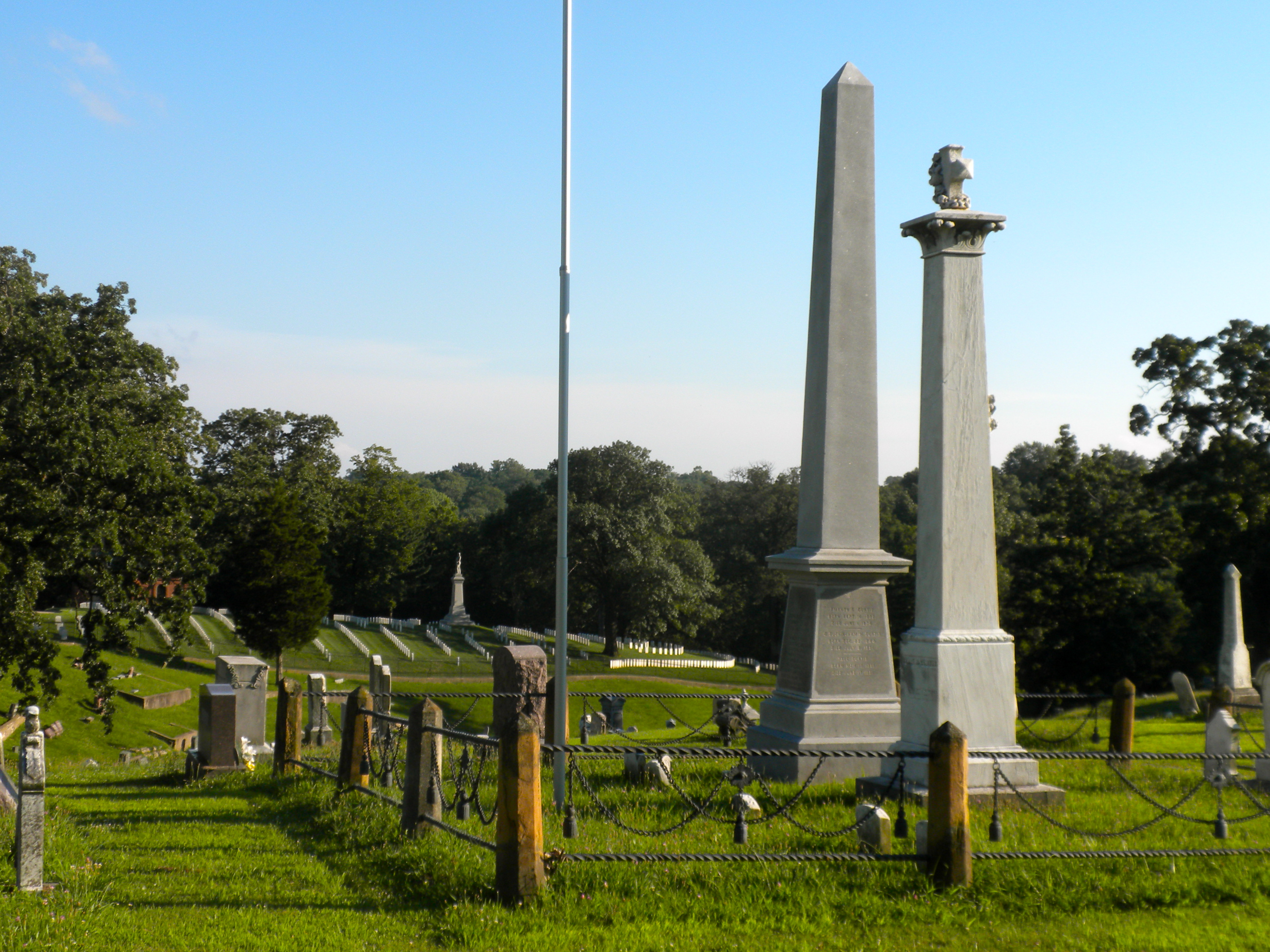

- Location within Iowa Location within the United States
- Location: 1701 J St. Keokuk, Iowa
- Coordinates: 40°23′58″N 91°24′13″W
- Area: 21.7 acres (8.8 ha)
- Built: 1862
- Architect: Montgomery C. Meigs
- Architectural style: Second Empire
- MPS: Civil War Era National Cemeteries MPS
- NRHP reference No.: 97000528
- Added to NRHP: June 04, 1997

Keokuk National Cemetery is a United States National Cemetery located in the city of Keokuk in Lee County, Iowa. It encompasses 22.7 acres (9.2 ha), and as of 2021, had over 6,000 interments. It is administered by Rock Island National Cemetery.

== History ==
Keokuk National Cemetery was created in a separate, donated plot of Oakland Cemetery during the American Civil War as a place to inter veterans who died in the five military hospitals in the area. It was one of the original twelve United States National Cemeteries established by President Abraham Lincoln and opened one year before Arlington National Cemetery. By the end of the Civil War, the cemetery had the interments of over 600 Union soldiers, and 8 Confederate prisoners of war. The gravestones distinguish between whom the soldiers fought for. If the soldiers fought for the Union then the graves have round tops whereas those that fought for the Confederacy have pointed tops.

In 1908 when Fort Yates, North Dakota was abandoned, the remains in its post cemetery were moved to Keokuk National Cemetery. In 1948, another post cemetery, in Des Moines, Iowa, also had its remains moved to the National Cemetery.

Keokuk National Cemetery was placed on the National Register of Historic Places in 1997.

== Notable monuments ==
The Unknown Soldiers monument was erected in 1912 by the Women's Corps of Keokuk in honor of 48 unknown soldiers buried at the cemetery. $2,000 in funding for the new monument was provided by the Iowa General Assembly. The monument is a large granite obelisk topped with the figure of a Union soldier standing at parade rest.

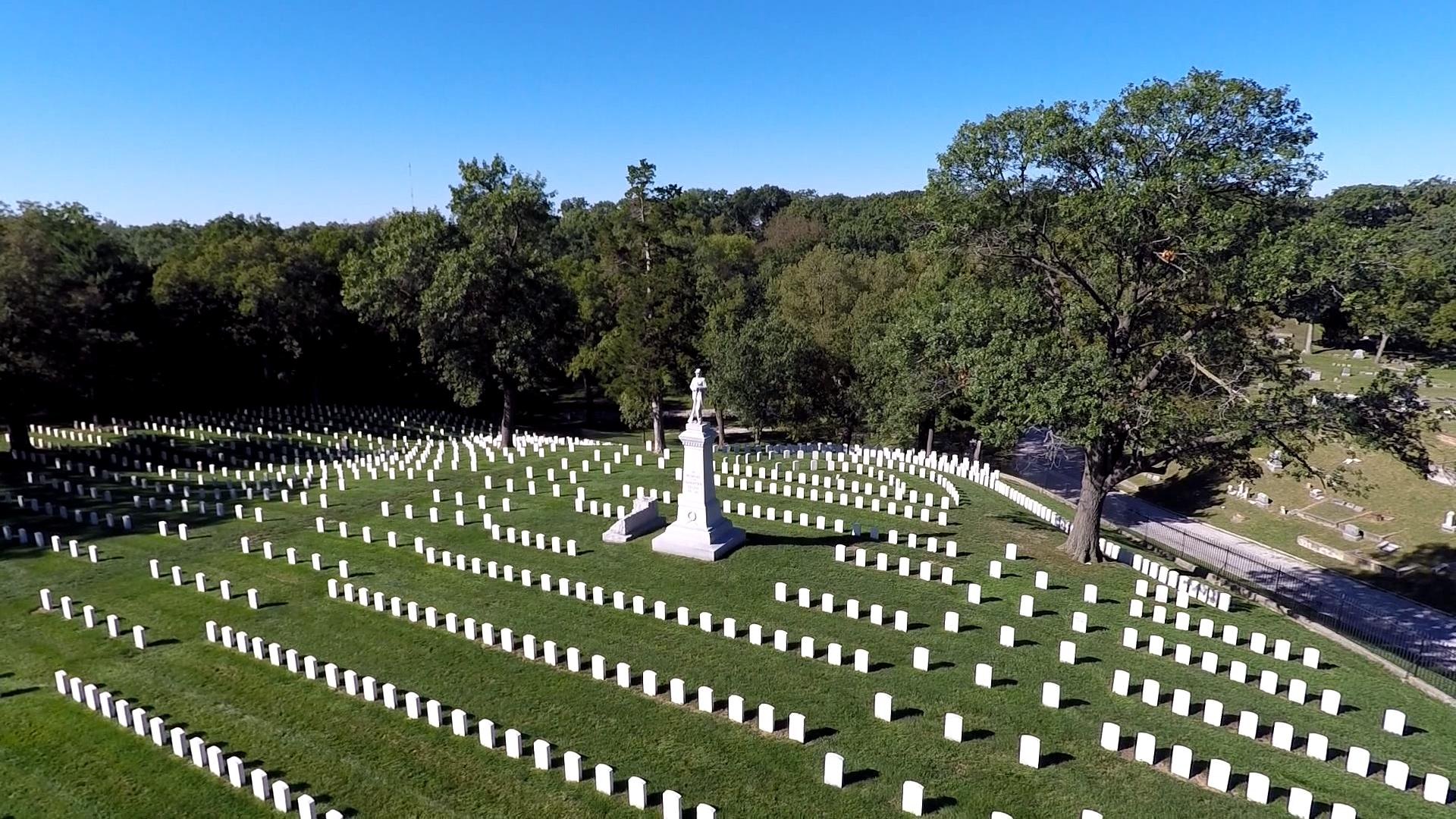
Unknown Soldiers Monument

The American War Dads and Auxiliaries of Iowa erected a bronze wreath dedicated to Unknown Soldiers. However the date of dedication of this monument is unknown.

== Notable interments ==
- Major General Samuel Ryan Curtis, American Civil War officer commanding, Battle of Pea Ridge, Battle of Westport.
- Private First Class John F. Thorson, Medal of Honor recipient for action in World War II.
- One Commonwealth war grave, of a Royal Canadian Air Force airman of World War II.
