= Raymond Harvey =

United States Army officer and Medal of Honor recipient

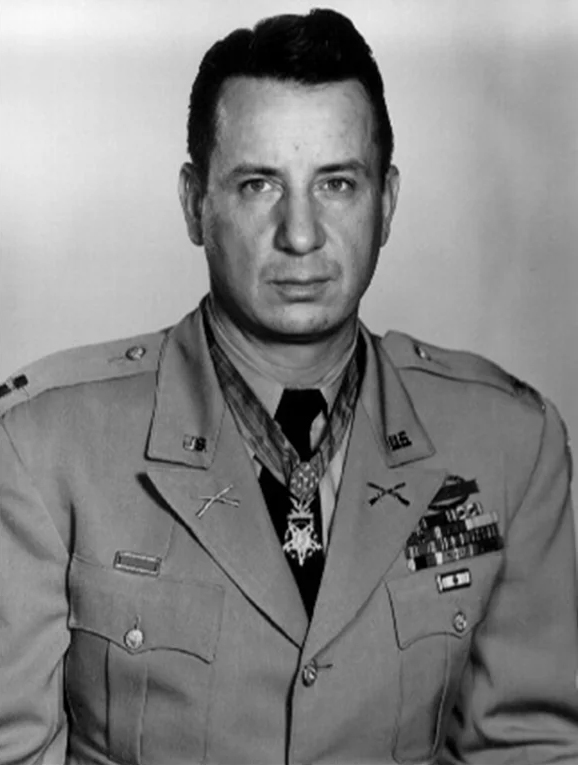
- Harvey in 1952
- Born: March 1, 1920; Ford City, Pennsylvania, U.S.
- Died: November 18, 1996 (aged 76); Scottsdale, Arizona, U.S.
- Burial place: Arlington National Cemetery
- Military career
- Allegiance: United States
- Branch: United States Army
- Service years: 1939–1962
- Rank: Lieutenant Colonel
- Units: 79th Infantry Division; 7th Infantry Division
- Commands: Company C, 17th Infantry Regiment, 7th Infantry Division
- Conflicts: World War II: Operation Overlord; Battle of the Bulge; Korean War: Battle of Inchon
- Awards: Medal of Honor; Distinguished Service Cross; Silver Star (3); Bronze Star Medal (3); Purple Heart (3)

Raymond G. Harvey (March 1, 1920 – November 18, 1996) was a lieutenant colonel in the United States Army who served during World War II and the Korean War. He received the Medal of Honor for his actions on March 9, 1951.

== Military service ==
Harvey enlisted in the United States Army on August 16, 1939.

=== World War II ===
During World War II, he served in the 79th Infantry Division, landing in Normandy, France, one week after the invasion of Normandy and participated in the division's campaigns in northern France and Germany. Harvey was decorated for valor several times, earning the Distinguished Service Cross, two Silver Stars, two Bronze Star Medals and two Purple Hearts.

=== Korean War ===
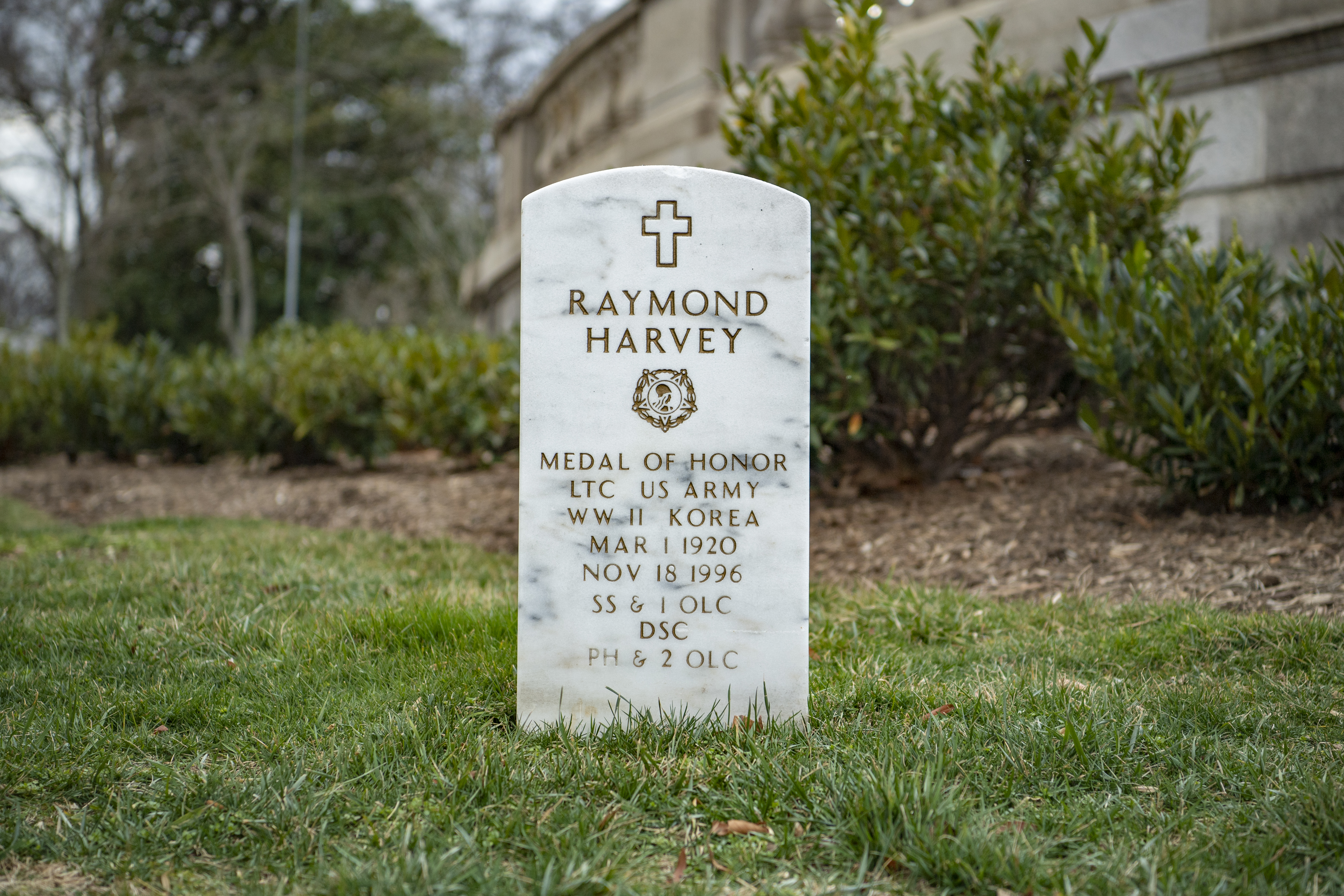
Grave at Arlington National Cemetery

After World War II ended, Harvey entered the Army's Organized Reserve, and returned to active duty in 1948. He was serving with the 7th Infantry Division in 1950 when the Korean War began, and landed with the division at Inchon, Korea, in September 1950. Shortly after the landing, and before the Chinese counterattack in November, Harvey took command of the division's Company C, 17th Infantry Regiment.

Harvey was in command of the company the following March, when it led the attack of 1st Battalion, 17th Infantry Regiment on Hill 1232 near Taemi-Dong, where he would earn the Medal of Honor. On that day Harvey, commanding Company C of the 17th Infantry Regiment, received orders to lead the attack on Hill 1232 overlooking Taemi-dong. But North Korean machine gun nests canvassed the hillside inside fortifications. Harvey and his men were soon pinned down under a hail of North Korean machine gun fire. Harvey charged up the hill alone in the face of enemy fire. He tossed grenades into the first pillbox he got to, killing those inside. He then advanced on the next entrenchment and dispatched all five occupants with his M1 carbine. The men of Company C eventually joined Harvey, only to watch their commander charge the next machine gun nest. He single-handedly wiped out gunners in another fortification while taking a bullet to the chest.

Eyewitnesses then saw Harvey, bleeding and probably moving on adrenaline, crawl toward another enemy stronghold disguised with logs. He burst upon them with his carbine. Unable to move, he ordered his men to complete the mission with a final push. Harvey refused medical care until Hill 1232 had been taken.

Wounded in the battle, Harvey was presented a third Silver Star while in the aid station, for bravery in the fall 1950 campaign after the Inchon landings. On July 5, 1951, Harvey was presented the Medal of Honor by President Harry S Truman at a White House ceremony. Truman called them the "backbone of the government" and the "reason we will win the Cold War." He then added with a touch of reverence that he would rather have that Medal of Honor than be president.

== Medal of Honor citation ==
Medal of Honor

Rank and organization: Captain, U.S. Army, Company C, 17th Infantry Regiment, 7th Infantry Division

Place and date: Vicinity of Taemi-Dong, Korea, March 9, 1951

Entered service at: Pasadena, Calif. Born: March 1, 1920 Ford City, Pennsylvania

G.O. No.: 67, August 2, 1951

Citation:

Capt. Harvey Company C, distinguished himself by conspicuous gallantry and intrepidity above and beyond the call of duty in action. When his company was pinned down by a barrage of automatic weapons fire from numerous well-entrenched emplacements, imperiling accomplishment of its mission, Capt. Harvey braved a hail of fire and exploding grenades to advance to the first enemy machine gun nest, killing its crew with grenades. Rushing to the edge of the next emplacement, he killed its crew with carbine fire. He then moved the 1st Platoon forward until it was again halted by a curtain of automatic fire from well fortified hostile positions. Disregarding the hail of fire, he personally charged and neutralized a third emplacement. Miraculously escaping death from intense crossfire, Capt. Harvey continued to lead the assault. Spotting an enemy pillbox well camouflaged by logs, he moved close enough to sweep the emplacement with carbine fire and throw grenades through the openings, annihilating its 5 occupants. Though wounded he then turned to order the company forward, and, suffering agonizing pain, he continued to direct the reduction of the remaining hostile positions, refusing evacuation until assured that the mission would be accomplished. Capt. Harvey's valorous and intrepid actions served as an inspiration to his company, reflecting the utmost glory upon himself and upholding the heroic traditions of the military service.

== Later years ==
Harvey was assigned to be military technical adviser to Samuel Fuller for his Korean War film Fixed Bayonets! (1951). The two of them struck up a friendship with Harvey also acting as technical advisor on Fuller's Verboten! (1958) and accompanied Fuller and his wife to Europe at the end of the 1950s to scout locations for a projected filming of The Big Red One for Warner Bros. that was not produced. Harvey remained in the army after the Korean War and rose to the rank of lieutenant colonel before retiring in 1962. After retirement, he was employed by the Northrop Corporation, then worked as an investment banker, and also served as Director of Indian Affairs for the Arizona Division of Emergency Services. He retired fully after a stroke in 1981.

He died in 1996 at the age of 76 and is buried with full military honors at Arlington National Cemetery, Arlington County, Virginia.

== Military awards ==
Harvey's military awards, which include the Medal of Honor, Distinguished Service Cross, three Silver Stars, three Bronze Star Medals and three Purple Hearts, make him one of the most highly decorated infantry soldiers in U.S Army history. He was also awarded the French Croix de Guerre with Palm (from the government of France) and the Chungmu Cordon Medal with Gold Star (by the government of South Korea).

Badge	Combat Infantryman Badge with star denoting 2nd award		
1st row	Medal of Honor		
2nd row	Distinguished Service Cross	Silver Star	Bronze Star Medal with "V" Device and 2 Oak leaf clusters
3rd row	Purple Heart with 2 Oak leaf clusters	Army Good Conduct Medal with 1 Good Conduct Loop	American Defense Service Medal
4th row	American Campaign Medal	European-African-Middle Eastern Campaign Medal with 4 Campaign stars	World War II Victory Medal
5th row	Army of Occupation Medal	National Defense Service Medal with 1 Oak leaf cluster	Korean Service Medal with 4 Campaign stars
6th row	Armed Forces Reserve Medal	United Nations Service Medal Korea	Korean War Service Medal Retroactively Awarded, 2003
Unit Awards	Presidential Unit Citation with 1 Oak leaf cluster		Korean Presidential Unit Citation

Croix de Guerre with Palm	Order of Military Merit Chungmu Cordon Medal

== Personal awards and honors ==
Harvey's personal awards and honors include:

- Clyde Elrod Award
- Medal of Valor (Arizona)
- George Washington Award (Arizona)
- Military Order of Distinguished Service and Patriotism Award
- Retired Officers Association Heritage Award
- Medal of Honor (New York City)
- American Red Cross Certificate of Merit
- Man of the Year Award, Pasadena, California

== See also ==
- List of Korean War Medal of Honor recipients
