= Einar H. Ingman Jr. =

United States Army Medal of Honor recipient (1929–2015)

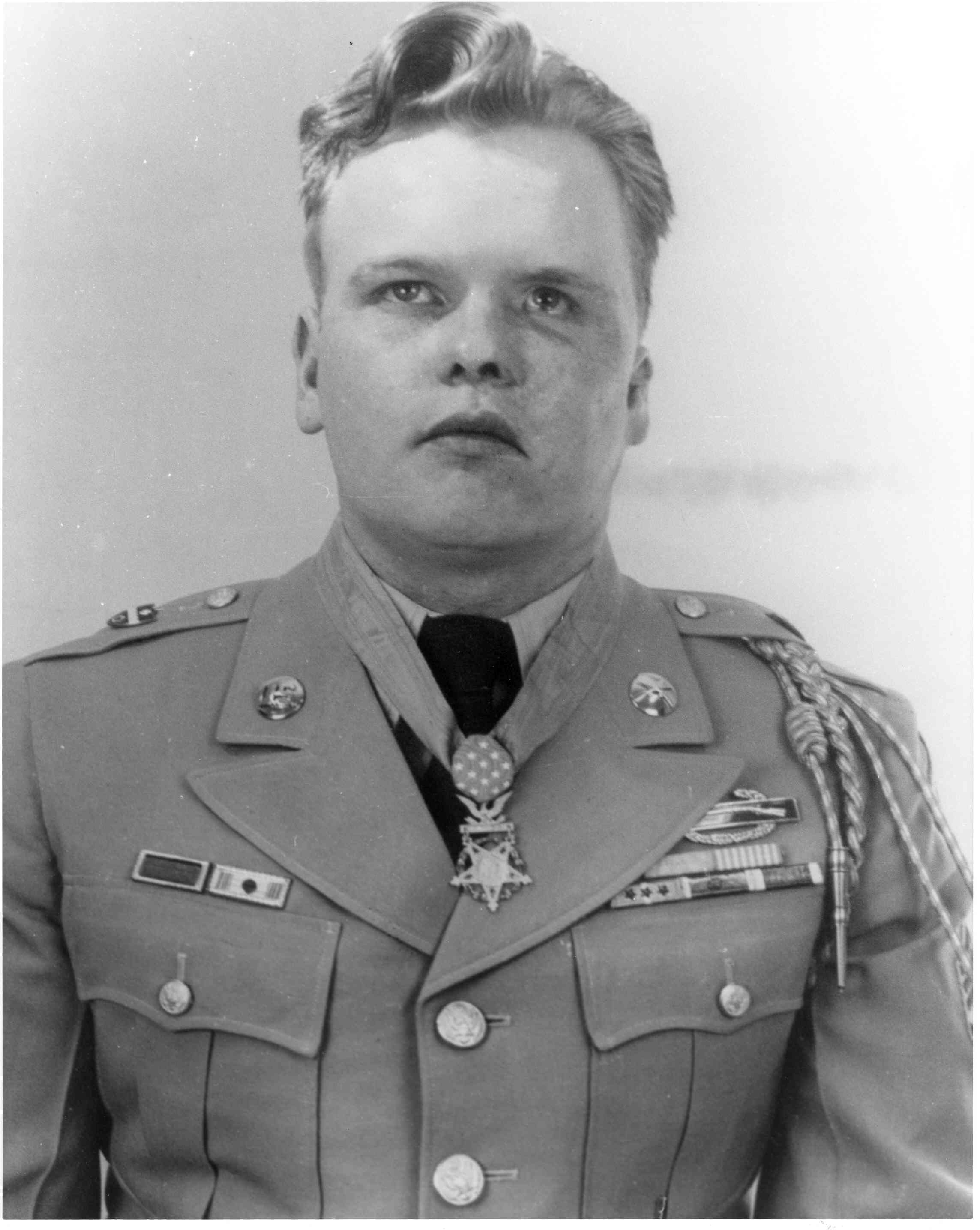
- Medal of Honor recipient Einar Ingman
- Born: Einar Harold Ingman Jr. October 6, 1929; Milwaukee, Wisconsin
- Died: September 9, 2015 (aged 85); Tomahawk, Wisconsin
- Burial place: Oak Hill Cemetery, Skanawan, Wisconsin
- Military career
- Allegiance: United States
- Branch: United States Army
- Rank: Sergeant
- Units: 17th Infantry Regiment, 7th Infantry Division
- Conflicts: Korean War
- Awards: Medal of Honor; Purple Heart (2)

Einar Harold Ingman Jr. (October 6, 1929 – September 9, 2015) was a United States Army soldier who received the Medal of Honor for his actions during the Third Battle of Wonju in the Korean War.

== Military service ==
Ingman was born on October 6, 1929, in Milwaukee, Wisconsin, and grew up on a farm. He joined the Army from Kewaskum, Wisconsin in November 1948, hoping to work with heavy machinery, but instead served as an infantryman.

By February 26, 1951, he was a corporal serving with Company E, 17th Infantry Regiment, 7th Infantry Division, in Korea. On that day, near the town of Malta-ri, he was among two squads of men tasked with assaulting a fortified ridge-top position. When both squad leaders were wounded, Ingman combined the squads and took command. After making a radio call for artillery and tank support, he led his soldiers against the position, encouraging them and directing their fire.

He single-handedly attacked a machine gun which was firing on his group, tossing a hand grenade into the emplacement and killing the crew with his rifle. While approaching a second machine gun, he was knocked to the ground and lost part of his left ear when a grenade exploded near his head. As he got to his feet, he was shot in the face by a Chinese soldier; the bullet entered his upper lip and exited behind his ear. He continued his attack on the machine gun, firing his rifle and killing the remaining crew with his bayonet, until falling unconscious. His men went on to capture their objective and force the opposing troops into a disorganized retreat.

Evacuated to Tokyo, Japan, for medical treatment, Ingman regained consciousness seven days later. His left eye was destroyed, his left ear was deaf, and he had suffered a brain injury which rendered him a complete amnesiac, unable to recall his own name. After having emergency brain surgery, his memories slowly returned, although he never regained any memory of being shot or of the events which immediately followed, and continued to have memory trouble for the rest of his life. Sent to Percy Jones Army Hospital in Battle Creek, Michigan, for further treatment, he spent the next two years undergoing twenty-three surgeries.

In mid-1951, Ingman, recently promoted to sergeant, was flown from his hospital to Washington, D.C., where President Harry Truman formally presented him with the Medal of Honor on July 5. Upon arriving home in Tomahawk, Wisconsin, the townspeople gave him a new car and boat during a celebration of his return.

== Post-war life ==
Following his discharge from the Army, Ingman returned to Tomahawk and worked 32 years for a paper company, first as a security guard and then as a mail clerk. One year after receiving the medal, Ingman married; he and his wife the former Mardelle Goodfellow, went on to have seven children. The couple attended numerous government and military-related events through the years, including eleven presidential inaugurations and several trips to Korea.

Ingman suffered a debilitating stroke in 2003 which affected his speech and mobility. He lived in Irma, Wisconsin, just south of Tomahawk. He died in a hospital at Tomahawk on September 9, 2015, at the age of 85.

== Awards and honors ==

Badge	Combat Infantryman Badge		
1st row	Medal of Honor		
2nd row	Purple Heart with bronze oak leaf cluster	Army Good Conduct Medal	National Defense Service Medal
3rd row	Korean Service Medal with three bronze campaign stars	United Nations Korea Medal	Republic of Korea War Service Medal
Unit awards	Presidential Unit Citation		Korean Presidential Unit Citation

=== Medal of Honor citation ===
Ingman's official Medal of Honor citation reads:

Sgt. Ingman, a member of Company E, distinguished himself by conspicuous gallantry and intrepidity above and beyond the call of duty in action against the enemy. The 2 leading squads of the assault platoon of his company, while attacking a strongly fortified ridge held by the enemy, were pinned down by withering fire and both squad leaders and several men were wounded. Cpl. Ingman assumed command, reorganized and combined the 2 squads, then moved from 1 position to another, designating fields of fire and giving advice and encouragement to the men. Locating an enemy machine gun position that was raking his men with devastating fire he charged it alone, threw a grenade into the position, and killed the remaining crew with rifle fire. Another enemy machine gun opened fire approximately 15 yards away and inflicted additional casualties to the group and stopped the attack. When Cpl. Ingman charged the second position he was hit by grenade fragments and a hail of fire which seriously wounded him about the face and neck and knocked him to the ground. With incredible courage and stamina, he arose instantly and, using only his rifle, killed the entire guncrew before falling unconscious from his wounds. As a result of the singular action by Cpl. Ingman the defense of the enemy was broken, his squad secured its objective, and more than 100 hostile troops abandoned their weapons and fled in disorganized retreat. Cpl. Ingman's indomitable courage, extraordinary heroism, and superb leadership reflect the highest credit on himself and are in keeping with the esteemed traditions of the infantry and the U.S. Army.

== See also ==
- List of Korean War Medal of Honor recipients
