= Christian Ressler =

Austrian footballer

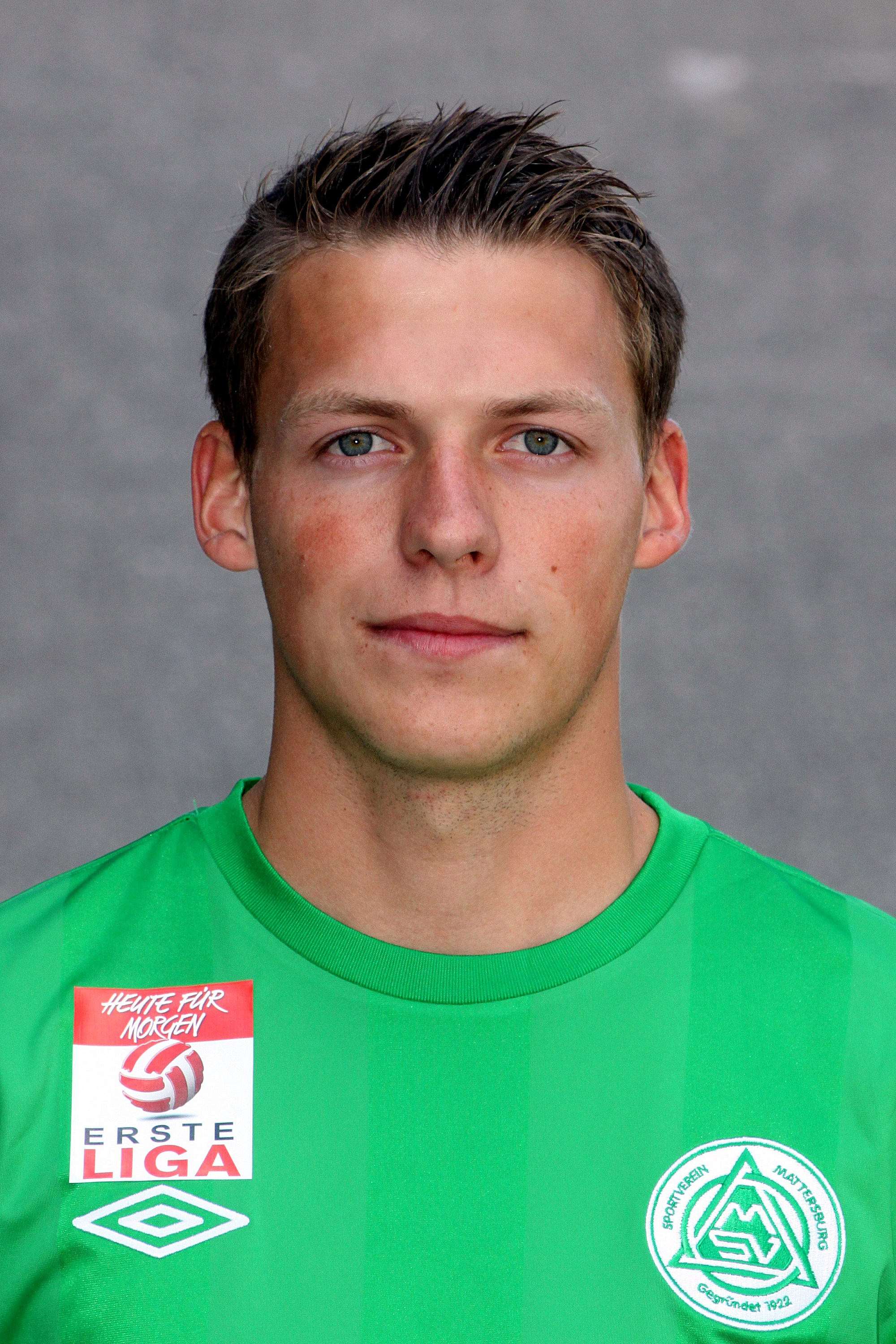
- Ressler in 2013.

Personal information
- Full name: Christian Ressler
- Date of birth: 13 July 1991 (age 35)
- Place of birth: Austria
- Position: Forward

Team information
- Current team: SV Mattersburg
- Number: 13

Senior career*
Years	Team	Apps	(Gls)
2012–	SV Mattersburg	14	(0)
- * Club domestic league appearances and goals as of 24 May 2014

Christian Ressler (born 13 July 1991) is an Austrian footballer who plays for SV Mattersburg.
