= Charles Barker (advertising agent) =

English advertising agent

Charles Barker (1791–1859) was an English advertising agent.

Charles Barker was born in Durham in 1791, the son of an attorney. Working as a King's Messenger in France, he returned to England in 1812, bringing news of Napoleon’s retreat from Moscow. Instead of delivering it directly to the King, Charles delivered the news to Nathan Mayer Rothschild, who used the advance knowledge to make a killing on the Stock Exchange.

In return, Rothschild set Charles up in business, brokering space in The Times – the fledgling steps of one of the world's first advertising agencies. The agency continues to this day as the oldest advertising agency in the City of London. His sons followed him into the business and they covered a wide spectrum of interests. He died in 1859.

The agency was floated in 1986 and changed its name initially to BNB Resources in 1989 and subsequently to BNB Recruitment Solutions in 2004. On the 29th of June 2009, Barkers Group Ltd. went into administration. The business and assets were purchased by Penna PLC and the company currently continues to trade as "Penna Communications" specialising in recruitment advertising with a wide range of public and private sector clients. Producing traditional press advertising, outdoor, radio, television and digital work.
