= George Berg =

George Francis Berg
- Born: December 2, 1868; Mount Erie, Illinois, U.S.
- Died: November 27, 1945 (aged 76); Washington, D.C., U.S.
- Burial place: Mount Pleasant Cemetery South Portland, Maine
- Military career
- Allegiance: United States of America
- Branch: United States Army
- Rank: Master Sergeant
- Unit: 17th Infantry Regiment
- Conflicts: Spanish–American War
- Awards: Medal of Honor

George Francis Berg (December 2, 1868 - November 27, 1945) was an American soldier serving in the United States Army during the Spanish–American War who received the Medal of Honor for bravery.

== Biography ==
Berg was born December 2, 1868, in Mount Erie, Illinois. After entering the army, he was sent to fight with Company C, 17th U.S. Infantry in the Spanish–American War.

He died November 27, 1945, and is buried in Mount Pleasant Cemetery South Portland, Maine.

== Medal of Honor citation ==
Rank and organization: Private, Company C, 17th U.S. Infantry. Place and date: At El Caney, Cuba, 1 July 1898. Entered service at: ______. Birth: Wayne County, Ill. Date of issue: Unknown.

Citation:

Gallantly assisted in the rescue of the wounded from in front of the lines and while under heavy fire of the enemy.

== See also ==
- List of Medal of Honor recipients for the Spanish–American War
