= Oscar Brookin =

- Born: July 19, 1869; Byron, Wisconsin, US
- Died: August 18, 1938 (aged 69); Ohio, US
- Military career
- Allegiance: United States
- Branch: United States Army
- Service years: 1893 - 1899
- Rank: Private
- Unit: 17th Infantry Regiment
- Conflicts: Spanish–American War; *Battle of El Caney
- Awards: Medal of Honor

Oscar Brookin (or Brookins) (19 July 1869 in Byron, Wisconsin – 18 August 1938) served in the United States Army during the Spanish–American War. He received the Medal of Honor for his actions during the Battle of El Caney.

Brookin joined the army from Milwaukee, Wisconsin in January 1893, and served until being discharged in March 1899. He died in 1938 and is buried in Sunset Cemetery in Galloway, Ohio.

== Medal of Honor citation ==
His award citation reads:

For The President of the United States of America, in the name of Congress, takes pleasure in presenting the Medal of Honor to Private Oscar Brookin, United States Army, for extraordinary heroism on 1 July 1898, while serving with Company C, 17th U.S. Infantry, in action at El Caney, Cuba. Private Brookin gallantly assisted in the rescue of the wounded from in front of the lines and under heavy fire from the enemy.

== See also ==
- List of Medal of Honor recipients
