= Warren J. Shepherd =

- Born: September 28, 1871; Cherry Tree, Pennsylvania, US
- Died: April 22, 1942 (aged 70)
- Burial place: Inglewood Park Cemetery Inglewood, California
- Military career
- Allegiance: United States
- Branch: United States Army
- Service years: 1895 - 1898
- Rank: Corporal
- Units: Company D, 17th U.S. Infantry
- Conflicts: Spanish–American War
- Awards: Medal of Honor

Warren Julius Shepherd (September 28, 1871 - April 22, 1942) was a corporal serving in the United States Army during the Spanish–American War who received the Medal of Honor for bravery.

== Biography ==
Shepherd was born September 28, 1871, in Cherry Tree, Pennsylvania and joined the army from St. Louis, Missouri in October 1895. He was sent to fight in the Spanish–American War with Company D, 17th U.S. Infantry as a corporal where he received the Medal of Honor for his actions.

His heroism in the El Carney battle has received recognition by various groups and organizations. The Pennsylvania Historic Marker erected in his honor is inscribed as follows:

Shepherd fought in the Spanish-American War at El Caney, Cuba with Company D, 7th U.S. Infantry. He was awarded the Medal of Honor on July 1, 1898. Superior officers repeatedly cited him for bravery above and beyond the call of duty. Born in Bullsburg (Cherry Tree), September 28, 1871, he attended the Pine Grove School across the street. He was born and raised a short distance just up Sylvis Road. After the war he moved to California and started his own business and was very successful. He died there April 24, 1942. He served his generation in his time because of his love for his Lord and Savior Jesus Christ. He was discharged in November 1898.

Shepherd died on April 22, 1942, and as interred April 28 in Inglewood Park Cemetery in Inglewood, California.

== Medal of Honor citation ==
Rank and organization: Corporal, Company D, 17th U.S. Infantry. Place and date: At El Caney, Cuba, 1 July 1898. Entered service at: Westover, Pa. Birth: Cherry Tree, Pa. Date of issue: 21 August 1899.

Citation:

Gallantly assisted in the rescue of the wounded from in front of the lines under heavy fire from the enemy.

== See also ==
- List of Medal of Honor recipients for the Spanish–American War
