= Charles H. Barker =

United States Army Medal of Honor recipient

Charles Heyward Barker
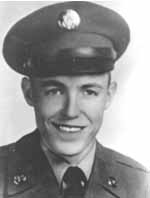
- Private Charles Barker
- Born: April 12, 1935; Six Mile, South Carolina, U.S.
- Died: June 4, 1953 (aged 18); Pork Chop Hill, Yeoncheon, Korea
- Burial place: National Memorial Cemetery of the Pacific, Honolulu, Hawaii
- Military career
- Allegiance: United States of America
- Branch: United States Army
- Service years: 1952–1953
- Rank: Private First Class
- Units: 3rd Battalion, 17th Infantry Regiment, 7th Infantry Division
- Conflicts: Korean War: Second Battle of Pork Chop Hill (MIA)
- Awards: Medal of Honor; Purple Heart

Charles Heyward Barker (April 12, 1935 – June 4, 1953) was a United States Army soldier in the Korean War who received the U.S. military's highest decoration, the Medal of Honor.

== Biography ==
Born on April 12, 1935, in Pickens County, South Carolina, Barker joined the Army from that county in 1952. He served in Korea as a private with Company K of the 17th Infantry Regiment, 7th Infantry Division. During the Battle of Pork Chop Hill on June 4, 1953, near Sokkogae in Yeoncheon, his platoon was on patrol outside the Pork Chop outpost when they surprised a group of Chinese soldiers digging entrenchments. Barker and another soldier provided covering fire with their rifles and grenades while the rest of the platoon moved to a better position on higher ground. As the fight intensified and ammunition ran low, the platoon was ordered to withdraw to the outpost. Barker volunteered to stay behind and cover the retreat; he was last seen engaging Chinese soldiers in hand-to-hand combat.

Barker was initially classified as missing in action, then declared dead one year after the battle. He was posthumously promoted to private first class and, on June 7, 1955, awarded the Medal of Honor for his actions on Pork Chop Hill.

== Medal of Honor citation ==
Barker's official Medal of Honor citation reads:

Pfc. Barker, a member of Company K, distinguished himself by conspicuous gallantry and indomitable courage above and beyond the call of duty in action against the enemy. While participating in a combat patrol engaged in screening an approach to "Pork-Chop Outpost," Pfc. Barker and his companions surprised and engaged an enemy group digging emplacements on the slope. Totally unprepared, the hostile troops sought cover. After ordering Pfc. Barker and a comrade to lay down a base of fire, the patrol leader maneuvered the remainder of the platoon to a vantage point on higher ground. Pfc. Barker moved to an open area firing his rifle and hurling grenades on the hostile positions. As enemy action increased in volume and intensity, mortar bursts fell on friendly positions, ammunition was in critical supply, and the platoon was ordered to withdraw into a perimeter defense preparatory to moving back to the outpost. Voluntarily electing to cover the retrograde movement, he gallantly maintained a defense and was last seen in close hand-to-hand combat with the enemy. Pfc. Barker's unflinching courage, consummate devotion to duty, and supreme sacrifice enabled the patrol to complete the mission and effect an orderly withdrawal to friendly lines, reflecting lasting glory upon himself and upholding the highest traditions of the military service.

== Medals and Decorations ==

Badge	Combat Infantryman Badge		
1st row	Medal of Honor	Purple Heart	National Defense Service Medal
2nd row	Korean Service Medal with 1 Campaign star	United Nations Service Medal Korea	Korean War Service Medal Retroactively Awarded, 2003
Unit awards	Korean Presidential Unit Citation		

== See also ==
- List of Korean War Medal of Honor recipients
