= Bruno Wende =

- Born: April 17, 1859; Germany
- Died: December 27, 1929 (aged 70)
- Military career
- Allegiance: United States
- Branch: United States Army
- Rank: Sergeant Major
- Units: Company C, 17th U.S. Infantry
- Conflicts: Spanish–American War
- Awards: Medal of Honor

Bruno Wende (April 17, 1859 – December 27, 1929) was a private serving in the United States Army during the Spanish–American War who received the Medal of Honor for bravery.

== Biography ==
Wende was born April 17, 1859, in Germany and after immigrating to the United States, entered the army from Canton, Ohio. He was sent to fight in the Spanish–American War with Company C, 17th U.S. Infantry as a private where he received the Medal of Honor for his actions.

He died December 27, 1929.

== Medal of Honor citation ==
Rank and organization: Private, Company C, 17th U.S. Infantry. Place and date: At El Caney, Cuba, 1 July 1898. Entered service at: Canton, Ohio. Birth: Germany. Date of issue: 22 June 1899.

Citation:

Gallantly assisted in the rescue of the wounded from in front of the lines and under heavy fire from the enemy.

== See also ==
- List of Medal of Honor recipients for the Spanish–American War
