= Norman W. Ressler =

Norman Ward Ressler
- Born: May 27, 1873; Dalmatia, Pennsylvania, US
- Died: September 29, 1914 (aged 41)
- Military career
- Allegiance: United States
- Branch: United States Army
- Service years: 1895 - 1900, 1902 - 1914
- Rank: Sergeant
- Units: Company D, 17th U.S. Infantry
- Conflicts: Spanish–American War
- Awards: Medal of Honor

Norman W. Ressler (May 27, 1873 – September 29, 1914) was a corporal serving in the United States Army during the Spanish–American War who received the Medal of Honor for bravery.

== Biography ==
Ressler was born May 27, 1873, in Dalmatia, Pennsylvania and entered the army from St. Louis, Missouri in October 1895. He was sent to fight in the Spanish–American War with Company D, 17th U.S. Infantry as a corporal where he received the Medal of Honor for his actions. He was discharged in October 1900, and rejoined the army in January 1902.

Ressler died on September 29, 1914.

== Medal of Honor citation ==
Rank and organization: Corporal, Company D, 17th U.S. Infantry. Place and date: At El Caney, Cuba, 1 July 1898. Entered service at: Dalmatia, Pa. Birth: Dalmatia, Pa. Date of issue: 21 August 1899.

Citation:

Gallantly assisted in the rescue of the wounded from in front of the lines and under heavy fire of the enemy.

== See also ==
- List of Medal of Honor recipients for the Spanish–American War
