= Kilmer =

Kilmer may refer to:

== People ==
- Aline Murray Kilmer (1888–1941), American poet and children's book author
- Anne Draffkorn Kilmer (1931–2023), American historian and professor of Assyriology
- Bev Kilmer (born 1951), American politician in Florida
- Billy Kilmer (born 1939), American football player, coach, and commissioner
- Derek Kilmer (born 1974), American politician from Washington State
- Ethan Kilmer (born 1983), American football player
- Frederick Barnett Kilmer (1851–1934), American pharmacist, author, public health activist and director
- Jack Kilmer (born 1995), American actor, son of Val Kilmer
- Joanne Whalley-Kilmer (born 1961), British actress
- John E. Kilmer (1930–1952), U.S. Navy Medal of Honor recipient
- Josh Kilmer-Purcell (born 1969), American writer, businessperson, and television personality
- Joyce Kilmer (1886–1918), American poet, teacher and soldier killed in World War I
- Misha Kilmer, American mathematician
- Scotty Kilmer (born 1953), American Youtubber
- Val Kilmer (1959–2025), American stage, film and television actor
- Willis Sharpe Kilmer (1869–1940), American patent medicine manufacturer, newspaperman, horse breeder, and entrepreneur
- Kilmer B. Corbin (1919–1993), American politician and attorney
- Kilmer S. McCully (1933–2025), Chief of Pathology and Laboratory Medicine Services for the United States Department of Veterans Affairs Medical Center

== Fictional ==
- Kilmer (Marvel Comics), cartoon character, a Neo superhuman

== Other ==
- Camp Kilmer, U.S. military facility in New Jersey
- Joyce Kilmer Middle School, Vienna, Virginia
- USS John E. Kilmer, American destroyer

== See also ==
- Douglas Killmer (1947–2005), American bass guitarist whose name is commonly misspelled Kilmer
- Kilmar (disambiguation)
