= William R. Charette =

United States Navy Medal of Honor recipient (1932–2012)

William Richard Charette
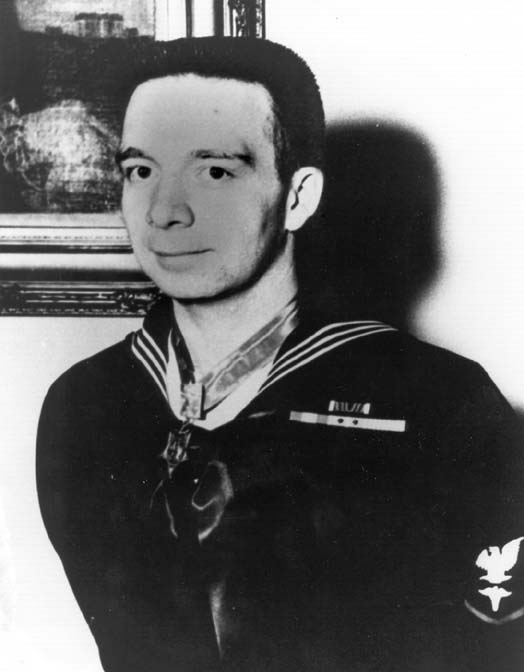
- Charette in c. 1954
- Born: March 29, 1932; Ludington, Michigan
- Died: March 18, 2012 (aged 79); Lakeland, Florida
- Burial place: Florida National Cemetery
- Military career
- Allegiance: United States
- Branch: United States Navy
- Service years: 1951–1977
- Rank: Master Chief Hospital Corpsman
- Units: F Company, 2nd Battalion, 7th Marine Regiment, 1st Marine Division
- Conflicts: Korean War; Battle for Outpost Vegas
- Awards: Medal of Honor; Purple Heart

William Richard Charette (March 29, 1932 – March 18, 2012) was a United States Navy master chief hospital corpsman who received the nation's highest military decoration for valor, the Medal of Honor. He was awarded the medal for heroic actions "above and beyond the call of duty" on March 27, 1953, while assigned to a Marine Corps rifle company during the Korean War. He retired from the navy after 26 years of service.

== Early life ==
Charette was born on March 29, 1932, in Ludington, Michigan. Both of his parents died when he was four and he was raised by his uncle. He graduated from high school in Ludington, in 1951. He then took a job on a Lake Michigan ferry boat which led him to join the Navy.

== U.S. Navy career ==
=== Early career ===
Charette enlisted in the United States Navy on January 11, 1951, during the Korean War (1950–1953) and underwent recruit training at Naval Station Great Lakes, Illinois. He then attended the Hospital Corps School at Naval Training Center, Bainbridge, Maryland, becoming a Hospital Corpsman upon graduation. Afterwards, he was assigned to duty at the Naval Hospital in Charleston, South Carolina. On April 16, 1952, he was promoted to hospital corpsman third class.

=== Korea ===
He volunteered to serve in Korea with the Fleet Marine Force (FMF) as a hospital corpsman attached to a Marine Corps unit, and on November 25, 1952, he reported for duty at the Field Medical Service School, Camp Pendleton, California, for field training. After completing the course and graduating as a FMF corpsman, he was assigned to 3rd Platoon, Company F, 2nd Battalion, 7th Marine Regiment, 1st Marine Division, which embarked for South Korea on February 5, 1953.

=== Medal of Honor action ===
On the night of March 26, 1953, Chinese soldiers in North Korea attacked, and on March 27, overran two of three Marine hill outposts in North Korea manned by Marines and corpsmen from the 5th Marine Regiment, 1st Marine Division, named Vegas, Carson, and Reno (Vegas and Reno were overrun); Vegas was considered to be the most important outpost and the highest outpost that supported the other two outposts. Late morning that day, a head-on Marine assault was made to try and retake Vegas with the three rifle companies of the 5th Marines taking heavy casualties.

Fox Company, 2/7 Marines (2nd Battalion, 7th Marines were held in reserve) were then committed to the fight for Vegas. Charette and the other Fox Company corpsmen faced a growing number of casualties exposed to hostile small arms and mortar fire when Marines from his rifle company joined in the counterattack on March 27 against "Vegas Hill" with Charette's Third Platoon Commander, 2nd Lieutenant Theodore H. Chenoweth (Navy Cross), leading the assault in hand-to-hand fighting up the south side of the hill. When an enemy grenade landed near Charette and a badly wounded Marine he was aiding, he placed himself on top of the Marine in order to shield him from the explosion, and in doing so, the grenade's blast tore off Charette's helmet and destroyed his medical bag and knocked him unconscious. When he awoke, he found his face bleeding from shrapnel wounds and he couldn't see. He recovered enough to continue to aid Marines in the battle using torn parts of his uniform in order to dress battle wounds. In another instance, he removed his battle vest and placed it on another wounded Marine whose vest was destroyed from another explosion. In yet another instance, he attended to five Marines who were wounded in a trench from another explosion, and then stood up in the trench exposing himself to incoming rounds in order to carry the one most serious wounded comrade to safety. Charette sustained painful wounds during the day's battle and was recommended for the Navy Cross for extraordinary heroism. While still serving in Korea after the fighting ended there, he learned that he would receive the United States' highest military decoration for valor, the Medal of Honor.

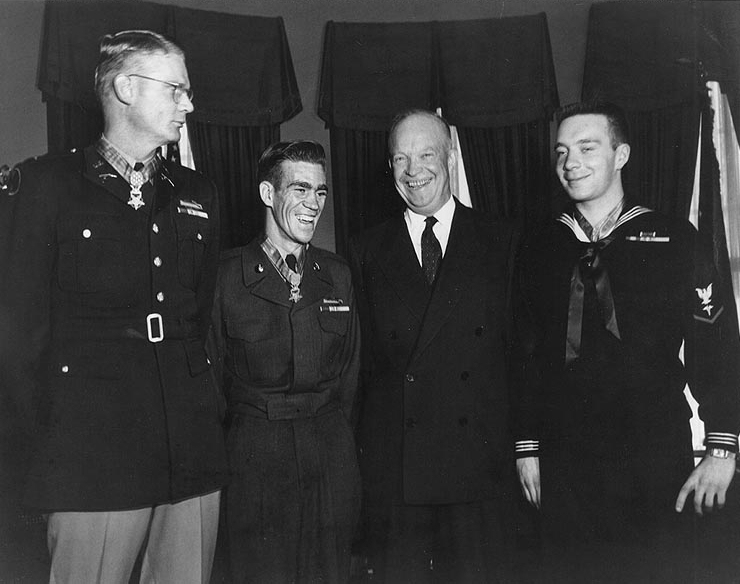
Charette stands with two other Medal of Honor recipients shortly after receiving their medals from President Dwight D. Eisenhower in 1954. From left: Edward R. Schowalter, Jr., Ernest E. West, Eisenhower, and Charette

Charette was presented the Medal of Honor from President Dwight D. Eisenhower during a ceremony at the White House in Washington, D.C., on January 12, 1954. Only five enlisted sailors were awarded the Medal of Honor for their heroic actions during the Korean War. All were Navy hospital corpsmen attached to the Marine Corps. Of the five (Edward C. Benfold, Richard Dewert, Francis C. Hammond, John E. Kilmer, and Charette), Charette was the only living recipient of the medal.

=== Later career ===
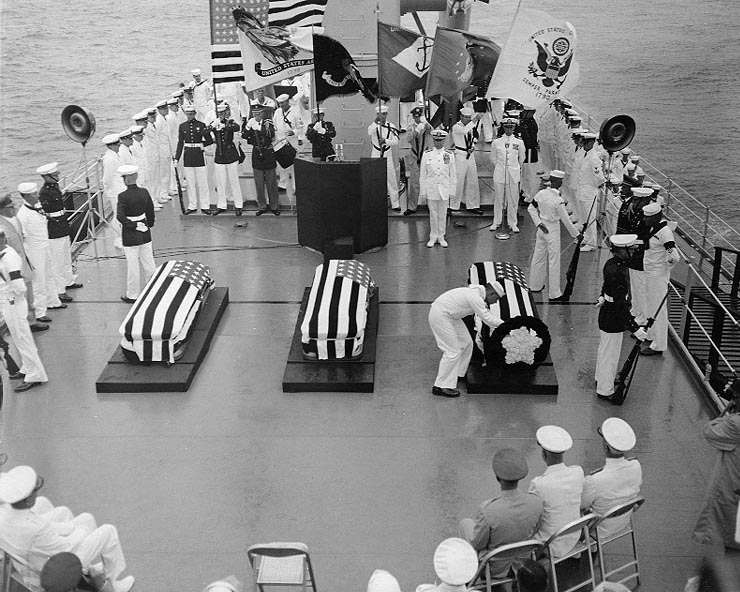
Charette selects a coffin for burial in the World War II Tomb of the Unknown from the three coffins representing World War II (Pacific and European theaters) and Korea during ceremonies on board the USS Canberra, May 26, 1958

Charette continued serving in the Navy, training new hospital corpsmen at the Naval Hospital Corps School in Great Lakes, Illinois. In 1958, aboard the USS Canberra, he had the honor of selecting the World War II remains (one from the Pacific, and one from the European) that would be placed in the Tomb of the Unknowns in Arlington National Cemetery.

He eventually transferred to the Submarine Service, becoming one of the first hospital corpsmen to serve on a nuclear submarine. He served as an Independent Duty Corpsman (IDC) in the Navy's nuclear submarine program. He served under Captain Edward L. Beach, Jr. on the USS Triton, but joined the crew too late to participate in Triton's historic circumnavigation voyage in 1960. He was also an IDC on the USS Sam Houston Gold crew 1962–1965.

Charette's other assignments included the USS Quillback; Fleet Ballistic Missile Training Center, Charleston, SC; USS Daniel Webster; Naval Hospital, Orlando, FL; USS Simon Bolivar; and at the Recruit Dispensary, Orlando, FL.

=== Retirement ===
Charette retired from the Navy at the rate (rank) of Master Chief Hospital Corpsman (HMCM) on April 1, 1977, after 26 years of service.

== Later years ==
Charette was a member of the following organizations:

- Congressional Medal of Honor Society
- Fleet Reserve Association in Charleston, South Carolina
- Korean War Veterans Association
- Sea Poacher Base United States Submarine Veterans Inc. (USSVI)
- Veterans of Foreign Wars Post 2420 in Lake Wales, Florida
- AMVETS Charette Post 82 in Ludington, Michigan (named in 1982)
- William R. Charette Chapter 158, Elks Lodge (named in 1974)

=== Death ===
Charette died at his home in Lake Wales, Florida, on March 18, 2012, due to complications from heart surgery. He was interred at the Florida National Cemetery in Bushnell, Florida. He was married for 57 years with four children.

== Medal of Honor citation ==
The President of the United States in the name of The Congress takes pleasure in presenting the MEDAL OF HONOR to

Hospital Corpsman Third Class William R. Charette
UNITED STATES NAVY

for service as set forth in the following
CITATION:

For conspicuous gallantry and intrepidity at the risk of his life above and beyond the call of duty in action against enemy aggressor forces during the early morning hours of 27 March 1953. Participating in a fierce encounter with a cleverly concealed and well-entrenched enemy force occupying positions on a vital and bitterly contested outpost far in advance of the main line of resistance, HM3 Charette repeatedly and unhesitatingly moved about through a murderous barrage of hostile small-arms and mortar fire to render assistance to his wounded comrades. When an enemy grenade landed within a few feet of a marine he was attending, he immediately threw himself upon the stricken man and absorbed the entire concussion of the deadly missile with his body. Although sustaining painful facial wounds, and undergoing shock from the intensity of the blast which ripped the helmet and medical aid kit from his person, HM3 Charette resourcefully improvised emergency bandages by tearing off part of his clothing, and gallantly continued to administer medical aid to the wounded in his own unit and to those in adjacent platoon areas as well. Observing a seriously wounded comrade whose armored vest had been torn from his body by the blast from an exploding shell, he selflessly removed his own battle vest and placed it upon the helpless man although fully aware of the added jeopardy to himself. Moving to the side of another casualty who was suffering excruciating pain from a serious leg wound, HM3. CHARETTE stood upright in the trench line and exposed himself to a deadly hail of enemy fire in order to lend more effective aid to the victim and to alleviate his anguish while being removed to a position of safety. By his indomitable courage and inspiring efforts in behalf of his wounded comrades, HM3 Charette was directly responsible for saving many lives. His great personal valor reflects the highest credit upon himself and enhances the finest traditions of the U.S. Naval Service.

Dwight D. Eisenhower

== Awards and Decorations ==
Charette's military decorations and awards include:

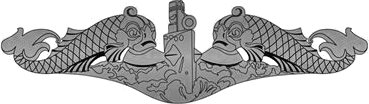

Badge	Submarine Warfare Insignia		
1st row	Medal of Honor		Purple Heart
2nd row	Navy Achievement Medal	Combat Action Ribbon Retroactively Awarded, 1999	Navy Unit Commendation
3rd row	Navy Good Conduct Medal with 6 Service stars	National Defense Service Medal with 1 Service star	Korean Service Medal with Fleet Marine Force Insignia and 2 Campaign stars
4th row	Korean Presidential Unit Citation	United Nations Service Medal Korea	Korean War Service Medal Retroactively Awarded, 2003

== Legacy ==
On April 30, 1999, the Charette Health Care Center, a part of the Naval Medical Center Portsmouth, Virginia, was dedicated in his honor.

AMVETS Post 82 of Ludington, Michigan, was named after Charette in 1982.

In downtown Ludington, there is a mural dedicated to William R. Charette. It depicts his tour of duty during which he earned the Medal of Honor. Charette was able to come to Ludington to view the mural in the years before his death.

A sign was put up near Spectrum Health Ludington Hospital that honors him.

A Sea Cadet unit is named in his honor, National Naval Medical Center Bethesda William R. Charette Battalion.

An Arleigh Burke-class guided missile destroyer, DDG-130, was commissioned in honor of William R. Charette on 1 August 2026.

== See also ==
- List of Korean War Medal of Honor recipients
