= Killmer =

Killmer may refer to:

== People ==
- Anja Killmer-Korn (1897-1981), German resistance fighter
- Douglas Killmer (1947-2005), American blues and rock guitarist
- Kara Killmer (born 1988), American actress
- Vonnie Killmer (born 1965), American basketball player
- Yvonne-Ruth Killmer (1921-2014), East German journalist

== See also ==
- Kilmer
