= Eduardo Gómez =

Eduardo Gómez may refer to:

- Eduardo Gómez (actor) (1951–2019), Spanish actor
- Eduardo Gómez (footballer) (born 1958), Chilean footballer
- Eduardo C. Gomez, U.S. Army soldier and recipient of the Medal of Honor
