= Baldonado =

Baldonado is a surname. Notable people with the surname include:

- Alberto Baldonado (born 1993), Panamanian baseball player
- Alonzo Baldonado (born 1974), American politician
- Habakkuk Baldonado (born 1999), Italian-born American football player
- Joe R. Baldonado (1930–1950), United States Army recipient of the Medal of Honor
