= Ernest E. West =

American soldier (1931–2021)

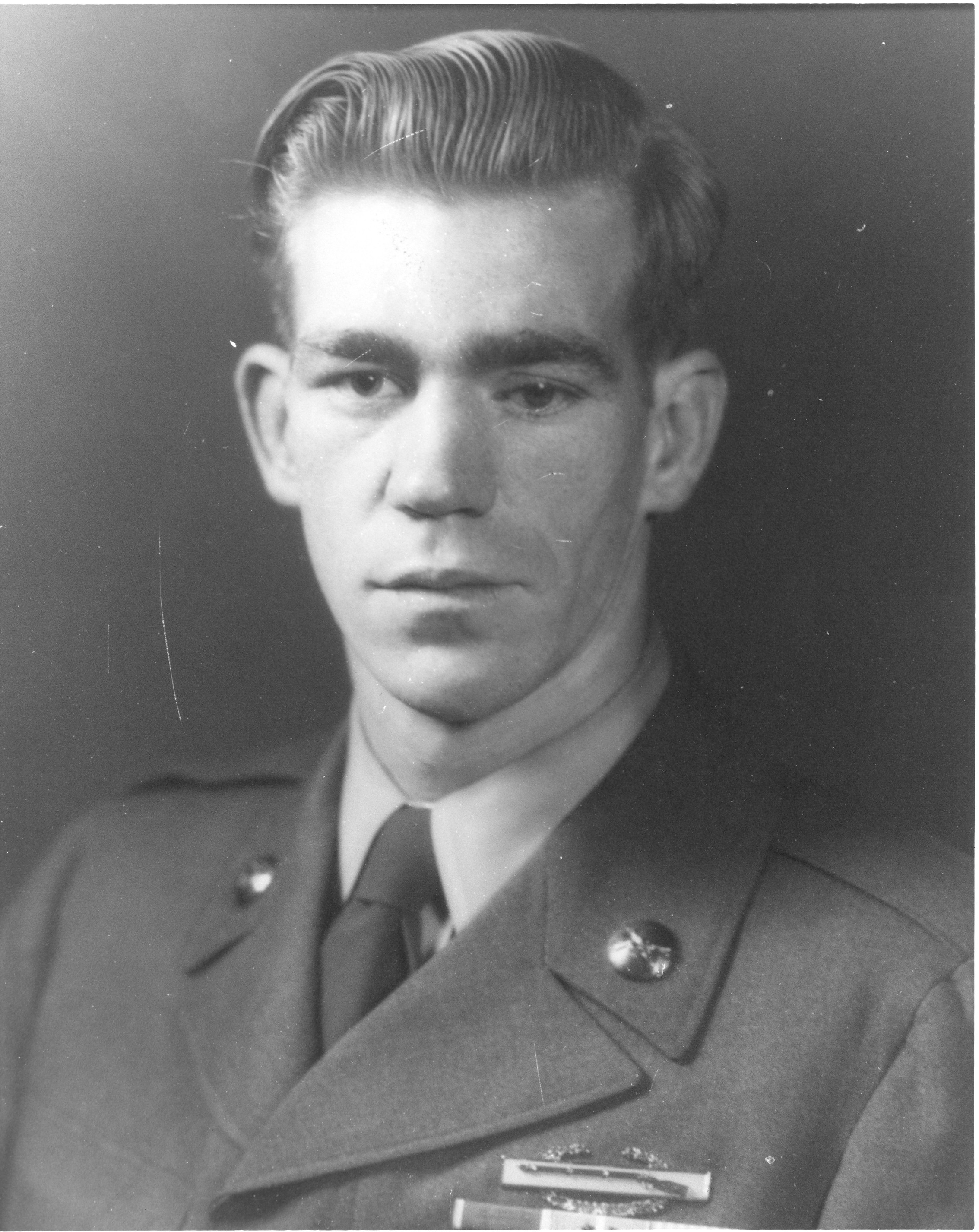
- Born: September 2, 1931; Russell, Kentucky, U.S.
- Died: May 1, 2021 (aged 89); Huntington, West Virginia, U.S.
- Burial place: Kentucky Veterans Cemetery Northeast; Greenup County, Kentucky
- Military career
- Allegiance: United States
- Branch: United States Army
- Service years: 1950–1953
- Rank: Private first class
- Units: 3rd Battalion, 14th Infantry Regiment
- Conflicts: Korean War
- Awards: Medal of Honor; Purple Heart

Ernest Edison West (September 2, 1931 – May 1, 2021) was a United States Army soldier and a recipient of the United States military's highest decoration, the Medal of Honor, for his actions during the Korean War.

== Early life ==
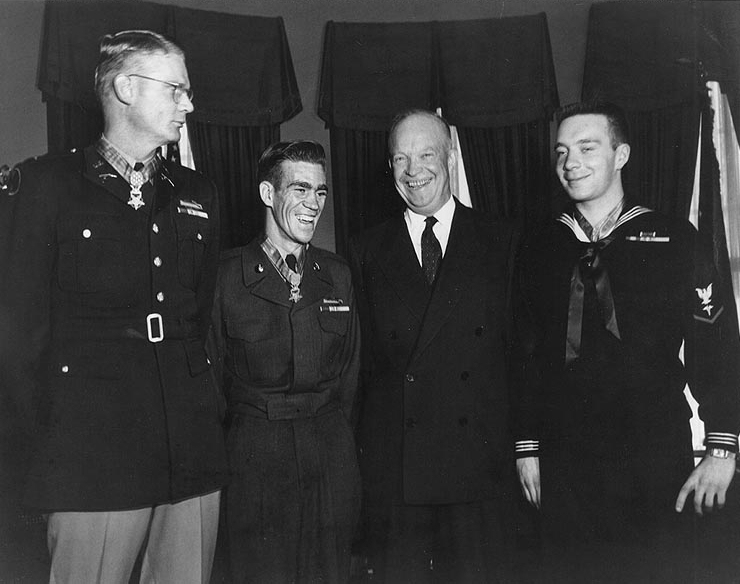
West stands with two other Medal of Honor recipients shortly after receiving their medals from President Dwight D. Eisenhower. From left: Edward R. Schowalter Jr., West, Eisenhower, and William R. Charette

West was born in Russell, Kentucky, on September 2, 1931. He grew up in an orphanage at the Methodist Children's Home in Versailles, Kentucky. He went on to reside in Wurtland and was employed by Chesapeake and Ohio Railway (now CSX Transportation).

== Korean War ==
West was drafted into the United States Army in 1950. By October 12, 1952, he was serving in Korea as a private first class with Company L, 14th Infantry Regiment, 25th Infantry Division. After his unit was ambushed near Sataeri on that day, he ran through heavy fire to rescue his wounded commander, Captain George Gividen. As he was pulling the man to safety, three hostile soldiers attacked. West shielded the commander with his body and killed the attackers with his rifle, suffering a wound which resulted in the loss of his eye in the process. Despite this injury, he remained on the field and assisted in the evacuation of other wounded men, at one point killing three more hostile soldiers.

For these actions, West was awarded the Medal of Honor just over a year later, on January 29, 1954. He was hesitant to receive the honor, believing that "if one was going to get a medal, everybody ought to have one. We all went, we all served." He was the second person from Greenup County to be conferred the Medal of Honor (after John W. Collier) and the first living recipient from that county.

== Post-war life ==
Upon his return from military service, West went back to Wurtland and to his job at C&O Railway. The company was initially reluctant to re-hire him due to his disability, but relented after a phone call with the Veterans Administration.

West died on May 1, 2021, at St. Mary's Medical Center in Huntington, West Virginia, at the age of 89. West was buried at Kentucky Veterans Cemetery Northeast in his home county.

== Medal of Honor citation ==
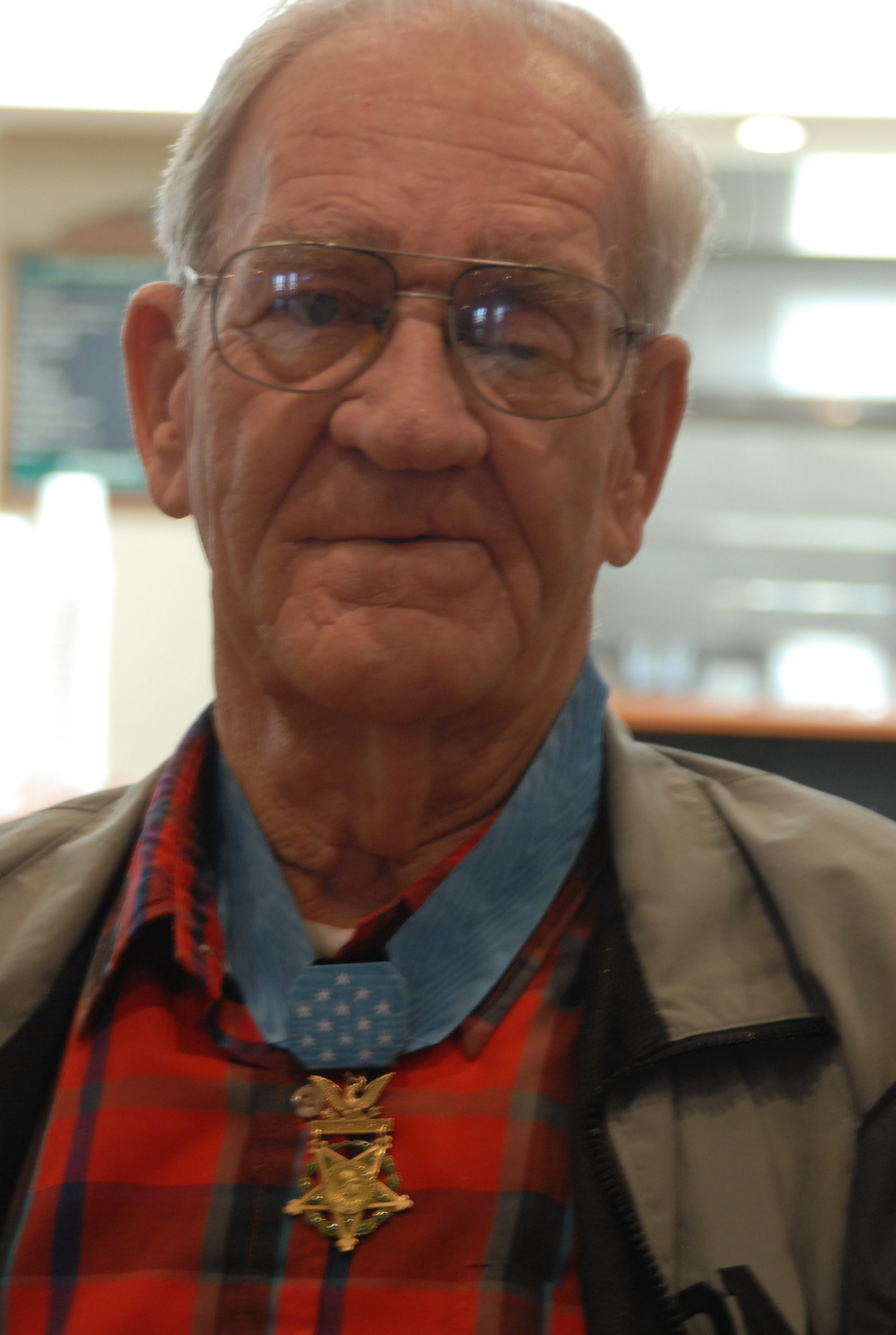
West in 2009

West's official Medal of Honor citation reads:

Pfc. West distinguished himself by conspicuous gallantry above and beyond the call of duty in action against the enemy. He voluntarily accompanied a contingent to locate and destroy a reported enemy outpost. Nearing the objective, the patrol was ambushed and suffered numerous casualties. Observing his wounded leader lying in an exposed position, Pfc. West ordered the troops to withdraw, then braved intense fire to reach and assist him. While attempting evacuation, he was attacked by 3 hostile soldiers employing grenades and small-arms fire. Quickly shifting his body to shelter the officer, he killed the assailants with his rifle, then carried the helpless man to safety. He was critically wounded and lost an eye in this action but courageously returned through withering fire and bursting shells to assist the wounded. While evacuating 2 comrades, he closed with and killed 3 more of the foe. Pfc. West's indomitable spirit, consummate valor, and intrepid actions inspired all who observed him, reflect the highest credit on himself, and uphold the honored traditions of the military service.

== Awards and decorations ==

Badge	Combat Infantryman Badge		
1st row	Medal of Honor		
2nd row	Purple Heart	Army Good Conduct Medal	National Defense Service Medal
3rd row	Korean Service Medal with 2 Campaign stars	United Nations Service Medal Korea	Korean War Service Medal Retroactively Awarded, 2003
Unit awards	Presidential Unit Citation		Korean Presidential Unit Citation

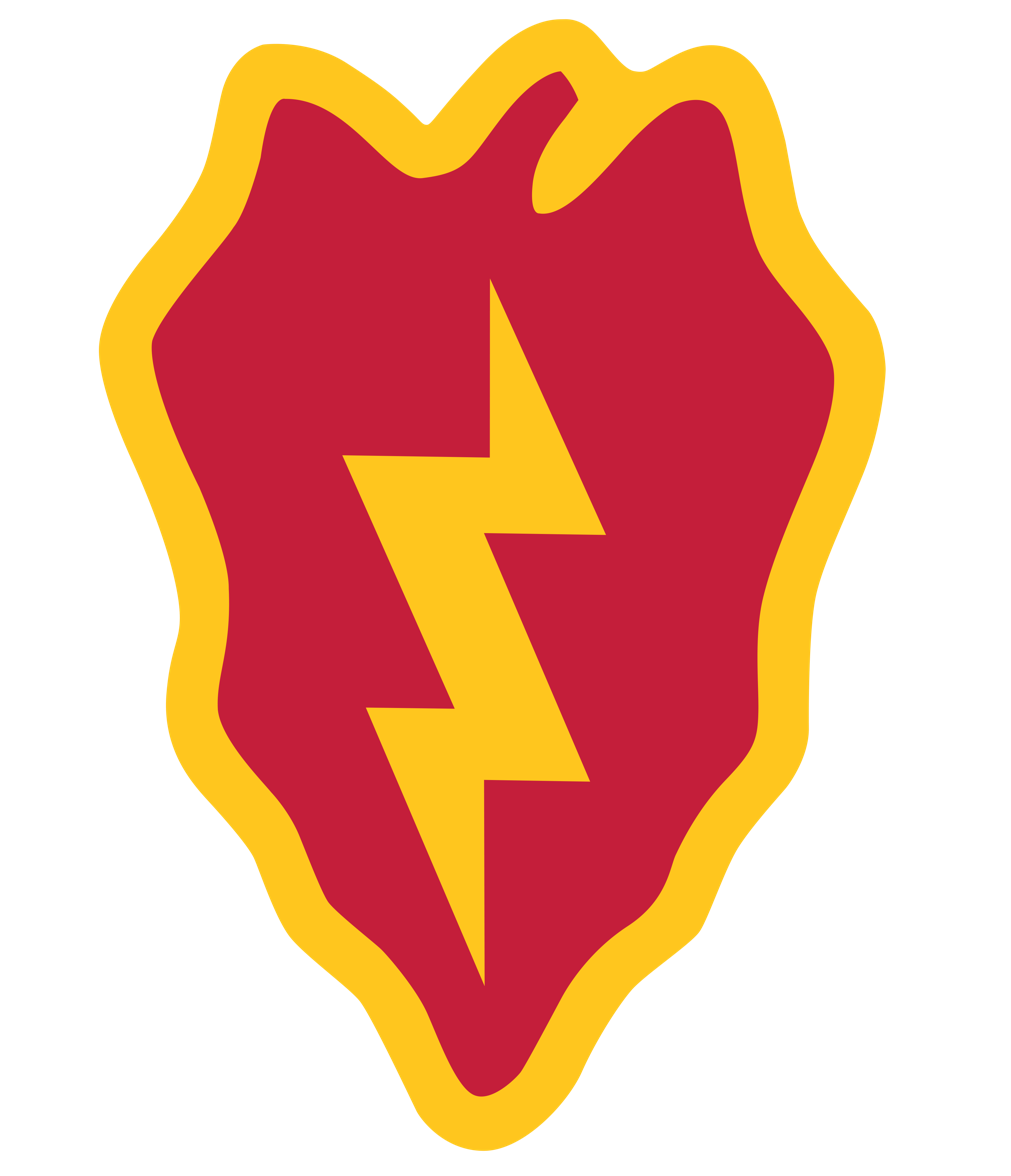

25th Infantry Division Insignia

== See also ==
- List of Medal of Honor recipients
- List of Korean War Medal of Honor recipients
