= Kilmar =

Kilmar may refer to:

== People ==
- Kilmar Abrego Garcia (born 1995), Salvadoran sheet metal worker illegally deported from the United States to El Salvador in 2025
- Kilmar Campos (born 1963), Venezuelan judoka

== Places ==
- Kilmar Tor, a hill in Cornwall, UK
- Kilmar, a community in Grenville-sur-la-Rouge, Quebec, Canada

== See also ==
- Kilmer (disambiguation)
