= List of Korean War Medal of Honor recipients =

This list represents all of the 153 United States military personnel who received the Medal of Honor for valor in combat during the Korean War. 107 Medals of Honor were awarded posthumously.

North Korea invaded South Korea on June 25, 1950, to attempt to reunite the Korean peninsula, which had been formally divided since 1948. The conflict was then expanded by Chinese, Soviet Union and United Nations involvement as part of the larger Cold War. The conflict continued until the armistice was signed on July 27, 1953.

== Korean War ==
=== Medal of Honor recipients ===
The Medal of Honor was created during the American Civil War and is the highest military decoration presented by the United States government to a member of its armed forces. Recipients must have distinguished themselves at the risk of their own life above and beyond the call of duty in action against an enemy of the United States.

Korean War Medal of Honor recipients by service branch

US Air Force – 4
US Army – 98
US Marine Corps – 42
US Navy – 8

Unknown – 1

Korean War Medal of Honor recipients

Lavender background indicates that the Medal of Honor was awarded posthumously

† indicates that the recipient was killed in action.
Note: Notes in quotations are derived or are copied from the official Medal of Honor citation

Photo	Name	Service	Rank	Place of action	Date of action	Unit	Notes
	Charles G. Abrell †	Marine Corps	Corporal	Hangnyong, Hwacheon, South Korea	June 10, 1951	2nd Battalion, 1st Marines, 1st Marine Division	Sacrificed his life to defeat an enemy bunker
	Stanley T. Adams	Army	Sergeant First Class	Sesim-ri, Korea	February 4, 1951	19th Infantry Regiment	For leading the repelling of an enemy attack
	Joe R. Baldonado †	Army	Corporal	Kangdong, Korea	November 25, 1950	1st Battalion, 187th Airborne Infantry Regiment	Sacrificed his life by remaining in an exposed machine gun position during an enemy attack; killed numerous enemy troops.
	William E. Barber	Marine Corps	Captain	Changjin, North Korea (Battle of Chosin Reservoir)	November 28, 1950 to December 2, 1950	Company F, 2nd Battalion, 7th Marines, 1st Marine Division	Risked his life as a commanding officer in action against enemy aggressor forces
	Charles H. Barker †	Army	Private	Sokkogae, Yeoncheon, South Korea	June 4, 1953	Company K, 17th Infantry Regiment, 7th Infantry Division	Killed while fighting the enemy in hand-to-hand combat
	William B. Baugh †	Marine Corps	Private First Class	Koto-ri to Hagaru-ri (along road between), Changjin, North Korea (Battle of Chosin Reservoir)	November 29, 1950	Company G, 3rd Battalion, 1st Marines, 1st Marine Division (Rein)	Sacrificed his life to save his fellow Marines during a nighttime enemy attack against a motorized column.
	Edward C. Benfold †	Navy	Hospitalman Third class	Korea	September 5, 1952	Company E, 2nd Battalion, 1st Marines, 1st Marine Division	Medical corpsman; sacrificed his life treating wounds and saving the lives of wounded Marines.
	Emory L. Bennett †	Army	Private First Class	Sobangsan, Korea	June 24, 1951	Company B, 15th Infantry Regiment, 3d Infantry Division.	Sacrificed his life to provide cover fire for withdrawing troops, continued to fire at the enemy until mortally wounded.
	David B. Bleak	Army	Sergeant	Minari-gol, Korea	June 14, 1952	Medical Company 223d Infantry Regiment, 40th Infantry Division	Risked his life to administer first aid to several wounded soldiers and killing several of the enemy
	Nelson V. Brittin †	Army	Sergeant First Class	Yonggong-ri, Korea	March 7, 1951	Company I, 19th Infantry Regiment	Sacrificed his life to kill 20 enemy soldiers and destroying four automatic weapons to help his company advance into an enemy position
	Melvin L. Brown †	Army	Private First Class	Chilgok, South Korea (Battle of Ka-san)	September 4, 1950	Company D, 8th Engineer Combat Battalion	Single-handedly defended a section of wall until all of his grenades and ammo was expended. He was reported KIA, September 5, 1950.
	Lloyd L. Burke	Army	First Lieutenant	Chong-dong, Korea	October 28, 1951	Company G, 5th Cavalry Regiment, 1st Cavalry Division	Risked his life to attack the enemy in order to rescue his company who had been pinned down
	Tony K. Burris †	Army	Sergeant First Class	Mundung-ri, Korea	October 8, 1951 to October 9, 1951	Company L, 38th Infantry Regiment, 2nd Infantry Division	Sacrificed his life to destroy multiple enemy positions and killing several of the enemy
	Hector A. Cafferata, Jr.	Marine Corps	Private	Changjin, North Korea (Battle of Chosin Reservoir)	November 28, 1950	Company F, 2nd Battalion, 7th Marines, 1st Marine Division (Rein.)	Risked his life to single-handedly fight off an enemy attack
	Richard E. Cavazos	Army	First lieutenant	Sagimgak, South Korea	June 14, 1953	Company E, 2nd Battalion, 65th Infantry Regiment, 3rd Infantry Division	Led his unit in repeated assaults on enemy positions and rescued wounded men under fire
	David B. Champagne †	Marine Corps	Corporal	Korea	May 28, 1952	Company A, 1st Battalion, 7th Marines, 1st Marine Division (Rein.)	Sacrificed his life to save the other members of his fireteam by throwing an enemy grenade out of the trench
	William R. Charette	Navy	Hospitalman Third class	Vegas Hill, Korea	March 27, 1953	Company F, 2nd Battalion, 7th Marines, 1st Marine Division	Medical corpsman; aided many fallen Marines under heavy fire.
	Cornelius H. Charlton †	Army	Sergeant	Chipo-ri, Korea	June 2, 1951	Company C, 24th Infantry Regiment, 25th Infantry Division	Killed due to multiple wounds sustained after several attacks against the enemy
	Stanley R. Christianson †	Marine Corps	Private First Class	Seoul, South Korea (Second Battle of Seoul)	September 29, 1950	Company E, 2nd Battalion, 1st Marines, 1st Marine Division (Rein.)	Killed after remaining in his position to allow his fellow Marines to be notified of an enemy attack
	Gilbert G. Collier †	Army	Corporal	Tutayon, Korea	July 19, 1953 to July 20, 1953	Company F, 223rd Infantry Regiment, 40th Infantry Division	Risked his life to remain with his wounded commanding officer while the remainder of the company returned to camp
—	John W. Collier †	Army	Corporal	Chindong-ri, Korea	September 19, 1950	Company C, 27th Infantry Regiment	Killed when he threw himself on a grenade
	Henry A. Commiskey, Sr.	Marine Corps	Second Lieutenant	Yongdungpo, South Korea	September 20, 1950	Company C, 1st Battalion, 1st Marines, 1st Marine Division (Rein.)	Risked his life to attack the enemy multiple times killing several and inflicting significant damage
Samuel S Coursen USMA 1949	Samuel Streit Coursen †	Army	First Lieutenant	Kaesong, North Korea	October 12, 1950	Company C, 5th Cavalry Regiment, 1st Cavalry Division	Killed while attempting to protect a fallen comrade
	Gordon M. Craig †	Army	Corporal	Ka-san, South Korea	September 10, 1950	Reconnaissance Company, 1st Cavalry Division	Killed after smothering a grenade with his body
	Jerry K. Crump	Army	Corporal	Chorwon, Korea	September 6, 1951 to September 7, 1951	Company L, 7th Infantry Regiment, 3rd Infantry Division	Wounded after smothering a grenade with his body
	Jack A. Davenport †	Marine Corps	Corporal	Songnae-dong, Korea	September 21, 1951	Company G, 3rd Battalion, 5th Marines, 1st Marine Division (Rein.)	Killed after throwing himself on a grenade
	George A. Davis †	Air Force	Major	Yalu River area, Sinuiju, North Korea	February 10, 1952	334th Fighter Squadron, 4th Fighter Group, 5th Air Force	Killed when trying to protect a squadron of bombers from a group of 15 enemy MiG's
	Ray Davis	Marine Corps	Lieutenant Colonel	Hagaru-ri, Changjin, North Korea (Battle of Chosin Reservoir)	December 1, 1950 to December 4, 1950	1st Battalion, 7th Marines, 1st Marine Division (Rein.)	For leading the rescue of a trapped rifle company
	Richard De Wert †	Navy	Hospitalman Third class	Korea	April 5, 1951	1st Marine Division (Rein.)	Medical corpsman; although wounded twice, continued to aid fallen Marines until killed while giving first aid to a fallen comrade.
	William F. Dean	Army	Major General	Taejon, South Korea (Battle of Taejon)	July 20, 1950 to July 21, 1950	Headquarters, 24th Infantry Division	Risked his life to lead the evacuation of Taejon after it had been overrun by the enemy.
	Reginald B. Desiderio †	Army	Captain	Ipsok, Korea	November 27, 1950	Company E, 27th Infantry Regiment, 25th Infantry Division	Although wounded, repeatedly attacked the enemy which motivated his men to defeat the opposing enemy force
	Duane E. Dewey	Marine Corps	Corporal	Panmunjom, Korea	April 16, 1952	Company E, 2nd Battalion, 5th Marines, 1st Marine Division (Rein.)	Risked his life to save a corpsman and several fellow Marines by smothering a grenade with his body
	Carl H. Dodd	Army	Second Lieutenant	Subuk, Korea	January 30, 1951 to January 31, 1951	Company E, 5th Infantry Regiment, 24th Infantry Division	Repeatedly attacked the enemy until he and his men successfully captured Hill 256
	Ray E. Duke †	Army	Sergeant First Class	Mugok, Korea	April 26, 1951	Company C, 21st Infantry Regiment, 24th Infantry Division	Convinced others to leave him and seek safety as he continued to fire at the enemy force until he was killed
	Junior D. Edwards †	Army	Sergeant First Class	Changbong-ri, Korea	January 2, 1951	Company E, 23d Infantry Regiment, 2nd Infantry Division	Killed after attacking the enemy multiple times killing several of them
	Victor H. Espinoza	Army	Corporal	Chorwon, Korea	August 1, 1952	1st Battalion, 23rd Infantry Regiment, 2nd Infantry Division	Single-handedly silenced a machine gun crew, discovered and destroyed covert enemy tunnel, wiped out two bunkers
—	John Essebagger, Jr. †	Army	Corporal	Popsudong, Korea	April 25, 1951	Company A, 7th Infantry Regiment, 3rd Infantry Division	Repeatedly attacked the enemy with machine gun fire until killed
	Don C. Faith, Jr. †	Army	Lieutenant Colonel	Changjin, North Korea (Battle of Chosin Reservoir)	November 27, 1950 to December 1, 1950	1st Battalion, 32nd Infantry Regiment, 7th Infantry Division	Risked his life repeatedly leading his men in combat for five days until he was killed
	Fernando Luis García †	Marine Corps	Private First Class	Korea	September 5, 1952	Company I, 3rd Battalion, 5th Marines, 1st Marine Division (Rein.)	For falling on a grenade to save his squad.
—	Charles George †	Army	Private First Class	Songnae-dong, Korea	November 30, 1952	Company C, 179th Infantry Regiment, 45th Infantry Division	Killed after smothering a grenade with his body
	Charles L. Gilliland †	Army	Private First Class	Tongmang-ri, Korea	April 25, 1951	Company I, 7th Infantry Regiment, 3rd Infantry Division	Killed after volunteering to stay behind and keep the enemy at bay so his unit could pull out
	Eduardo C. Gomez	Army	Sergeant	Tabu-dong, South Korea	September 3, 1950	8th Cavalry Regiment, 1st Cavalry Division	Crawled thirty yards across an open rice field to single-handedly destroy an enemy tank
	Edward Gomez †	Marine Corps	Private First Class	Hill 749, Korea	September 14, 1951	Company E, 2nd Battalion, 1st Marines, 1st Marine Division (Rein.)	Sacrificed his life to save his fellow Marines by smothering a grenade with his body
	Clair Goodblood †	Army	Corporal	Popsu-dong, Korea	April 24, 1951 to April 25, 1951	Company D, 7th Infantry Regiment, 3rd Infantry Division	Killed after refusing medical aid and being charged by the enemy he was found with over 100 enemy dead
	Ambrosio Guillen †	Marine Corps	Staff Sergeant	Songuch-on, Korea	July 25, 1953	Company F, 2nd Battalion, 7th Marines, 1st Marine Division (Rein.)	Exposed himself to attacks to supervise the defense of their position and the treatment and evacuation of the wounded
	Francis C. Hammond †	Navy	Hospitalman	Korea	March 26, 1953 to March 27, 1953	1st Battalion, 5th Marines, 1st Marine Division	Medical corpsman; sacrificed his life treating and directing wounded Marines until struck by a round of enemy mortar fire.
	Lester Hammond, Jr. †	Army	Corporal	Kumhwa, North Korea	August 14, 1952	Company A, 187th Airborne Regimental Combat Team	Killed while assisting the corpsmen with casualties and evacuation
	Melvin O. Handrich †	Army	Master Sergeant	Sobuk-san, Korea	August 25, 1950 to August 26, 1950	Company C, 5th Infantry Regiment	Killed after fighting off an enemy attack. Was found with more than 70 dead enemy around him
—	Jack G. Hanson †	Army	Private First Class	Pachi-dong, Korea	June 7, 1951	Company F, 31st Infantry Regiment, 7th Infantry Division	Was found dead with an empty pistol in his right hand, a bloody machete in his left hand and 22 dead enemy around him
	Lee R. Hartell †	Army	First Lieutenant	Kobangsan-ri, Korea	August 27, 1951	Battery A, 15th Field Artillery Battalion, 2nd Infantry Division	Died while directing fire on an attacking enemy force
	Raymond Harvey	Army	Captain	Taemi-dong, Korea	March 9, 1951	Company C, 17th Infantry Regiment	Severely wounded after attacking the enemy multiple times and inflicting multiple enemy casualties
LT FredrickHenry CMH	Frederick F. Henry †	Army	First Lieutenant	Am-dong, Korea	September 1, 1950	Company F, 38th Infantry Regiment	Killed after causing an estimated 50 enemy casualties
	Rodolfo P. Hernandez	Army	Corporal	Wontong-ri, Korea	May 31, 1951	Company G, 187th Airborne Regimental Combat Team	Although wounded, killed six of the enemy before falling unconscious from grenade, bayonet, and bullet wounds
	Thomas J. Hudner, Jr.	Navy	Lieutenant, Junior Grade	Changjin, North Korea (Battle of Chosin Reservoir)	December 4, 1950	Fighter Squadron 32, attached to U.S.S. Leyte	Risked his life to rescue a downed pilot
	Einar H. Ingman, Jr.	Army	Corporal	Maltari, Korea	February 26, 1951	Company E, 17th Infantry Regiment, 7th Infantry Division	Risked his life to destroy an enemy gun emplacement and allow his squad to finish their objective
	William R. Jecelin †	Army	Sergeant	Saga, Korea	September 19, 1950	Company C, 35th Infantry Regiment, 25th Infantry Division	Sacrificed his life by smothering a grenade with his body
	Charles R. Johnson (soldier) †	Army	Private first class	Outpost Harry; South Korea	June 12, 1953	Company B, 15th Infantry Regiment, 3rd Infantry Division	Defended wounded soldiers against enemy attack
	James E. Johnson †	Marine Corps	Sergeant	Yudam-ri (Ryudam-ri), Changjin, North Korea (Battle of Chosin Reservoir)	December 2, 1950	Company J, 3rd Battalion, 7th Marines, 1st Marine Division (Rein.)	Although seriously wounded, was last seen fighting the enemy hand to hand
—	Mack A. Jordan †	Army	Private First Class	Kumsong, Korea	November 15, 1951	Company K, 21st Infantry Regiment, 24th Infantry Division	Killed after volunteering to stay behind allowing his squad to escape
Anthony T. Kahoʻohanohano	Anthony T. Kahoʻohanohano †	Army	Private First Class	Near Chup'a-ri, Cheorwon, South Korea	September 1, 1951	Company H, 17th Infantry Regiment, 7th Infantry Division	Although wounded, held a position alone and fought hand-to-hand until being killed
—	Billie G. Kanell †	Army	Private	Pyonggang, Korea	September 7, 1951	Company I, 35th Infantry Regiment, 25th Infantry Division	Sacrificed his life by smothering a grenade with his body
Emil Kapaun	Emil Kapaun †	Army	Captain, US Army Chaplain Corps	Pyoktong, North Korea	May 23, 1951	3rd Battalion, 8th Cavalry, 1st Cavalry Division	Inside dismal prison camps, Kapaun risked his life by sneaking around the camp after dark, foraging for food, caring for the sick, and encouraging his fellow Soldiers
—	Loren R. Kaufman †	Army	Sergeant First Class	Yongsan, South Korea	September 4, 1950 to September 5, 1950	Company G, 9th Infantry Regiment	Repeatedly attacked the enemy forcing them to retreat
Head and torso of a man sitting with his arms folded on his lap, wearing a garrison cap, horn-rimmed glasses, and a military jacket. The jacket's left breast is completely covered in ribbon bars and medals.	Woodrow W. Keeble	Army	Master Sergeant	Sangsan-ri, Korea	October 20, 1951	Company G, 19th Infantry	Risked his life to personally destroy three enemy machine gun emplacements with hand grenades. Presented posthumously by President George W. Bush March 3, 2008
	John D. Kelly †	Marine Corps	Private First Class	Korea	May 28, 1952	Company C, 1st Battalion, 7th Marines, 1st Marine Division (Rein.)	Killed while attacking and destroying several enemy bunkers singlehandedly
	Jack W. Kelso †	Marine Corps	Private First Class	Korea	October 2, 1952	Company I, 3rd Battalion, 7th Marines, 1st Marine Division (Rein.)	Killed while providing cover fire for several Marines pinned down in a bunker allowing them to escape
	Robert S. Kennemore	Marine Corps	Staff Sergeant	Changjin, North Korea (Battle of Chosin Reservoir)	November 27, 1950 to November 28, 1950	Company E, 2nd Battalion, 7th Marines, 1st Marine Division (Rein.)	Deliberately covered an enemy grenade with his foot to keep his men from being wounded or killed
	John E. Kilmer †	Navy	Hospitalman	Korea	August 13, 1952	3rd Battalion, 7th Marines, 1st Marine Division	Medical corpsman; killed while shielding a wounded Marine with his body.
—	Noah O. Knight †	Army	Private First Class	Kowang-San, Korea	November 23, 1951 to November 24, 1951	Company F, 7th Infantry Regiment, 3rd Infantry Division	Killed while attacking three enemy troops attempting to place demolition charges
	John K. Koelsch †	Navy	Lieutenant, Junior Grade	Korea	July 3, 1951	Navy helicopter rescue unit	Died as a POW after rescuing several crewman from a downed helicopter and evading the enemy for nine days.
—	Ernest R. Kouma	Army	Sergeant First Class	Agok, Korea	August 31, 1950 to September 1, 1950	Company A, 72nd Tank Battalion	Risked his life by attacking and killing at least 250 of the enemy
	Leonard M. Kravitz †	Army	Private First Class	Yangpyong, South Korea	March 6, 1951 to March 7, 1951	Company M, 3rd Battalion, 5th Infantry Regiment	Provided suppressive fire for his retreating unit after position had been overrun by the enemy
—	Edward C. Krzyzowski †	Army	Captain	Tondul, Korea	August 31, 1951 to September 3, 1951	Company B, 9th Infantry Regiment, 2nd Infantry Division	For spearheading an assault against strongly defended Hill 700. Killed by an enemy sniper
	Darwin K. Kyle †	Army	Second Lieutenant	Kamil-ri, Korea	February 16, 1951	Company K, 7th Infantry Regiment, 3rd Infantry Division	For repeatedly attacking and destroying the enemy. Killed by a burst from an enemy submachine gun
	Hubert L. Lee	Army	Master Sergeant	Ip-ori, Korea	February 1, 1951	Company I, 23rd Infantry Regiment, 2nd Infantry Division	Although seriously wounded continued to lead his men and fight the enemy
	George D. Libby †	Army	Sergeant	Taejon, South Korea (Battle of Taejon)	July 20, 1950	Company C, 3rd Engineer Combat Battalion, 24th Infantry Division	Sacrificed his life to shield the driver of a rescue vehicle from enemy rounds
	Herbert A. Littleton †	Marine Corps	Private First Class	Chungchon, Korea	April 22, 1951	Company C, 1st Battalion, 7th Marines, 1st Marine Division (Rein.)	Sacrificed his life by smothering a grenade with his body
	Charles R. Long †	Army	Sergeant	Near Hoengseong, South Korea	February 12, 1951	Company M, 38th Infantry Regiment, 2nd Infantry Division	Remained in a forward position to target the enemy with mortar fire. Killed when his position was surrounded by the enemy
	Baldomero Lopez †	Marine Corps	First Lieutenant	Battle of Inchon, Korea	September 15, 1950	Company A, 1st Battalion, 5th Marines, 1st Marine Division (Rein.)	For smothering a hand grenade with his own body.
	Charles J. Loring, Jr. †	Air Force	Major	Sniper Ridge, Kumhwa, North Korea	November 22, 1952	80th Fighter-Bomber Squadron, 8th Fighter-Bomber Wing	Sacrificed his life by diving his damaged airplane into enemy gun emplacements
—	William F. Lyell †	Army	Corporal	Chup'a-ri, South Korea	August 31, 1951	Company F, 17th Infantry Regiment, 7th Infantry Division	Repeatedly exposed himself to enemy fire in order to defeat the enemy and was eventually killed by enemy mortar fire.
	Benito Martinez †	Army	Corporal	Satae-ri, Korea	September 6, 1952	Company A, 27th Infantry Regiment, 25th Infantry Division	Refused to be rescued due to enemy troop activity and continued to fight the enemy until killed.
	Daniel P. Matthews †	Marine Corps	Sergeant	Vegas Hill, Korea	March 28, 1953	Company F, 2nd Battalion, 7th Marines, 1st Marine Division (Rein.)	Sacrificed his life to silence an enemy gun emplacement
	Frederick W. Mausert, III †	Marine Corps	Sergeant	Songnap-yong, Korea	September 12, 1951	Company B, 1st Battalion, 7th Marines, 1st Marine Division (Rein.)	Although severely wounded singlehandedly defeated an enemy gun emplacement and drew enemy fire away from his men.
	Fred B. McGee	Army	Corporal	Tang-wan-ni, South Korea	June 16, 1952	Company K, 3rd Battalion, 17th Infantry Regiment, 7th Infantry Division	Covered the withdrawal of wounded soldiers
—	Robert M. McGovern †	Army	First Lieutenant	Kamyangjan-ri, Korea	January 30, 1951	Company A, 5th Cavalry Regiment, 1st Cavalry Division	Killed by a burst of machine gun fire after destroying an enemy gun emplacement
	Alford L. McLaughlin	Marine Corps	Private First Class	Korea	September 4, 1952 to September 5, 1952	Company L, 3rd Battalion, 5th Marines, 1st Marine Division (Rein.)	Although painfully wounded he continued to fight off the enemy until they were defeated
Head and shoulders of a smiling young man with dark hair wearing a garrison cap and a military jacket with two round pins on each lapel.	Leroy A. Mendonca †	Army	Sergeant	Chich-on, Korea	July 4, 1951	Company B, 7th Infantry Regiment, 3rd Infantry Division	Sacrificed his life by remaining in an exposed position and covering the platoon's withdrawal
Lewis Millett saluting 1985	Lewis L. Millett	Army	Captain	Hill 180 near Songtan or Anyang,South Korea	February 7, 1951	Company E, 27th Infantry Regiment, 25th Infantry Division	In taking an occupied hill, he led the last major American bayonet charge
	Frank N. Mitchell †	Marine Corps	First Lieutenant	Hansan-ri, Korea	November 26, 1950	Company A, 1st Battalion, 7th Marines, 1st Marine Division (Rein.)	Killed by a burst of small arms fire after single-handedly covering his squad's escape
	Ola L. Mize	Army	Sergeant	Surang-ri, Korea	June 10, 1953 to June 11, 1953	Company K, 15th Infantry Regiment, 3rd Infantry Division	Repeatedly risked his life to fight back the enemy and protect several wounded soldiers
	Walter C. Monegan, Jr. †	Marine Corps	Private First Class	Sosa-ri, Korea	September 17, 1950 and September 20, 1950	Company F, 2nd Battalion, 1st Marines, 1st Marine Division (Rein.)	Killed while repeatedly attacking the enemy at night
	Whitt L. Moreland †	Marine Corps	Private First Class	Kwagch'i-dong, Korea	May 29, 1951	Company C, 1st Battalion, 5th Marines, 1st Marine Division (Rein.)	Sacrificed his life by smothering a grenade with his body
—	Donald R. Moyer †	Army	Sergeant First Class	Near Seoul, South Korea (UN May–June 1951 counteroffensive)	May 20, 1951	Company E, 35th Infantry Regiment	Sacrificed his life by smothering a grenade with his body
	Raymond G. Murphy	Marine Corps	Second Lieutenant	Korea	February 3, 1953	Company A, 1st Battalion, 5th Marines, 1st Marine Division (Rein.)	Although wounded he refused medical care to fight the enemy until all his men and casualties had been taken care of.
	Hiroshi H. Miyamura	Army	Corporal	Taejon-ri, Korea	April 24, 1951 to April 25, 1951	Company H, 7th Infantry Regiment, 3rd Infantry Division	The first Medal of Honor to be classified Top Secret. This was because he was being held as a Prisoner of War by the Communists at the time.
	Reginald R. Myers	Marine Corps	Major	Hagaru-ri, Changjin, North Korea (Battle of Chosin Reservoir)	November 29, 1950	3rd Battalion, 1st Marines, 1st Marine Division (Rein.)	Although losing 170 of his men during 14 hours of combat in subzero temperatures, continued to reorganize his unit and spearhead the attack which resulted in 600 enemy killed and 500 wounded
	Wataru Nakamura †	Army	Private First Class	P’ungch’on-ni, South Korea (Battle of the Soyang River)	May 18, 1951	Company I, 3rd Battalion, 38th Infantry Regiment, 2nd Infantry Division	Single-handedly cleared several enemy bunkers
	Juan Negrón	Army	Master Sergeant	Kalma-Eri, Korea	April 28, 1951	65th Infantry Regiment, 3rd Infantry Division	Held the most vulnerable position on his company's position throughout the night, accurately hurling hand grenades at short range when hostile troops approached.
	Eugene A. Obregon †	Marine Corps	Private First Class	Seoul, South Korea (Second Battle of Seoul)	September 26, 1950	Company G, 3rd Battalion, 5th Marines, 1st Marine Division (Rein.)	Sacrificed his life by using his own body as a shield to protect another wounded Marine
	George H. O'Brien, Jr.	Marine Corps	Second Lieutenant	Korea	October 27, 1952	Company H, 3rd Battalion, 7th Marines, 1st Marine Division (Rein.)	Provided cover and care for wounded while his unit was attacking the enemy
	Bruno R. Orig †	Army	Private First Class	Chipyong-ni, South Korea (Battle of Chipyong-ni)	February 15, 1951	Company G, 2nd Battalion, 23rd Infantry Regiment, 2nd Infantry Division	Covered the withdrawal of wounded soldiers
	Joseph R. Ouellette †	Army	Private First Class	Yongsan, South Korea	August 31, 1950 to September 3, 1950	Company H, 9th Infantry Regiment, 2nd Infantry Division	Repeatedly risked his life to gather grenades and ammunition until killed by enemy fire
	John U. D. Page †	Army	Lieutenant Colonel	Changjin, North Korea (Battle of Chosin Reservoir)	November 29, 1950 to December 10, 1950	X Corps Artillery, while attached to the 52d Transportation Truck Battalion	Repeatedly attacked the enemy and defended his convoy until killed
	Mike C. Pena †	Army	Master Sergeant	Waegwan, Korea	September 4, 1950	2nd Battalion, 5th Cavalry Regiment	Covered his unit's retreat and single-handedly held off large enemy force overnight, until being killed the following morning
	Charles F. Pendleton †	Army	Corporal	Choo Gung-dong, Korea	July 16, 1953 to July 17, 1953	Company D, 15th Infantry Regiment, 3rd Infantry Division	Although wounded he refused medical treatment and continued to fight back the enemy until killed
	Lee H. Phillips †	Marine Corps	Corporal	Korea	November 27, 1950	Company E, 2nd Battalion, 7th Marines, 1st Marine Division (Rein.)	Risked his life to defeat a pocket of enemy resistance
	Herbert K. Pililaau †	Army	Private First Class	Pia-ri, Korea	September 17, 1951	Company C, 23rd Infantry Regiment, 2nd Infantry Division	After being killed fighting the enemy it was determined that he singlehandedly defeated more than 40 of the enemy
	John A. Pittman	Army	Sergeant	Kujangdong, Korea	November 26, 1950	Company C, 23rd Infantry Regiment, 2nd Infantry Division	Protected his squad by smothering a grenade with his body
	Ralph E. Pomeroy †	Army	Private First Class	Kumwha, North Korea	October 15, 1952	Company E, 31st Infantry Regiment, 7th Infantry Division	Sacrificed his life manning a heavy machine gun until mortally wounded
—	Donn F. Porter †	Army	Sergeant	Mundung-ri, Korea	September 7, 1952	Company G, 14th Infantry Regiment, 25th Infantry Division	Killed after fighting back a superior enemy force
	James I. Poynter †	Marine Corps	Sergeant	Sudong, Korea	November 4, 1950	Company A, 1st Battalion, 7th Marines, 1st Marine Division (Rein.)	Sacrificed his life to kill several of the enemy with hand grenades to save a group of fellow Marines
	Ralph Puckett	Army	First Lieutenant	Near Unsan, North Korea	November 25, 1950 to November 26, 1950	8th Ranger Company, 8213th Army Unit, 8th U.S. Army	Gallantry at the Battle for Hill 205 against several hundred Chinese troops
	George H. Ramer †	Marine Corps	Second Lieutenant	Korea	September 12, 1951	Company I, 3rd Battalion, 7th Marines, 1st Marine Division (Rein.)	Led his men against a superior enemy force and although wounded refused medical aid, manning his post until the enemy overran his position
Head and shoulders of a young man wearing a peaked cap and a military jacket with ribbon bars and a badge on the left breast.	Mitchell Red Cloud, Jr. †	Army	Corporal	Chonghyon, Korea	November 5, 1950	Company E, 19th Infantry Regiment, 24th Infantry Division	After being seriously wounded, refused medical treatment to continue to fight the enemy until he was killed
	Robert D. Reem †	Marine Corps	Second Lieutenant	Chinhung-ri, Korea	November 6, 1950	Company H, 3rd Battalion, 7th Marines, 1st Marine Division (Rein.)	Killed after he covered a grenade with his body
	Demensio Rivera	Army	Private First Class	Changyongni, Korea	May 22, 1951 to May 23, 1951	Company G, 2nd Battalion, 7th Infantry Regiment, 3rd Infantry Division	An automatic rifleman, Rivera tenaciously held a forward position exposed to heavy fire; when his rifle became inoperative, Rivera used his pistol and grenades, and eventually fought hand-to-hand and forced back the enemy.
	Joseph C. Rodriguez	Army	Private First Class	Munye-ri, Korea	May 21, 1951	Company F, 17th Infantry Regiment, 7th Infantry Division	Singlehandedly destroyed several enemy gun emplacements and foxholes
	Ronald E. Rosser	Army	Corporal	Ponggilli, Korea	January 12, 1952	Heavy Mortar Company, 38th Infantry Regiment, 2nd Infantry Division	Repeatedly risked his life to fight the enemy and rescue several wounded soldiers
	Tibor Rubin	Army	Corporal	Korea	July 23, 1950 to April 20, 1953	Company I, 8th Cavalry Regiment, 1st Cavalry Division	For single-handedly defending his regiment during their retreat, and saving the lives of many fellow soldiers in a Chinese POW camp.
	Daniel D. Schoonover †	Army	Corporal	Sokkogae, Yeoncheon, South Korea	July 8, 1953 to July 10, 1953	Company A, 13th Engineer Combat Battalion, 7th Infantry Division	Was last seen fighting the enemy with a machine gun before he was killed by artillery fire
	Edward R. Schowalter, Jr.	Army	First Lieutenant	Kumhwa, North Korea	October 14, 1952	Company A, 31st Infantry Regiment, 7th Infantry Division	Although wounded he continued to fight and lead his men until they defeated the enemy
	Louis J. Sebille †	Air Force	Major	Hanchang, Korea	August 5, 1950	67th Fighter-Bomber Squadron, 18th Fighter-Bomber Group, 5th Air Force	Killed after diving his aircraft into enemy troops
	Richard Thomas Shea †	Army	First Lieutenant	Sokkogae, Yeoncheon, South Korea	July 6, 1953 to July 8, 1953	Company A, 17th Infantry Regiment, 7th Infantry Division	After fighting off and killing several of the enemy he was last seen in close hand-to-hand combat with the enemy
	William E. Shuck, Jr. †	Marine Corps	Staff Sergeant	Korea	July 3, 1952	Company G, 3rd Battalion, 7th Marines, 1st Marine Division (Rein.)	Sacrificed his life to assure that all dead and wounded were evacuated
	Robert E. Simanek	Marine Corps	Private First Class	Korea	August 17, 1952	Company F, 2nd Battalion, 5th Marines, 1st Marine Division (Rein.)	Risked his life to save his comrades by smothering a grenade with his body
	William S. Sitman †	Army	Sergeant First Class	Chipyong-ri, South Korea	February 14, 1951	Company M, 23rd Infantry Regiment, 2nd Infantry Division	Sacrificed his life to save his comrades by smothering a grenade with his body
	Carl L. Sitter	Marine Corps	Captain	Hagaru-ri, Changjin, North Korea (Battle of Chosin Reservoir)	November 29, 1950 to November 30, 1950	Company G, 3rd Battalion, 1st Marines, 1st Marine Division (Rein.)	Although painfully wounded he refused to be evacuated and continued to fight until defense of the area was assured
	Sherrod E. Skinner, Jr. †	Marine Corps	Second Lieutenant	Korea	October 26, 1952	Battery F, 2nd Battalion, 11th Marines, 1st Marine Division (Rein.)	In addition to fighting off an enemy force for three hours he sacrificed his life by smothering a grenade with his body
	David M. Smith †	Army	Private First Class	Yongsan, South Korea	September 1, 1950	Company E, 9th Infantry Regiment, 2nd Infantry Division	Sacrificed his life to save his comrades by smothering a grenade with his body
—	Clifton T. Speicher †	Army	Corporal	Minarigol, Korea	June 14, 1952	Company F, 223rd Infantry Regiment, 40th Infantry Division	Died after wounds received after charging into an enemy machine gun nest
	James L. Stone	Army	First Lieutenant	Sokkogae, Yeoncheon, South Korea	November 21, 1951 to November 22, 1951	Company E, 8th Cavalry Regiment, 1st Cavalry Division	Captured while leading his men against an overwhelming enemy assault
—	Luther H. Story †	Army	Private First Class	Agok, Korea	September 1, 1950	Company A, 9th Infantry Regiment, 2nd Infantry Division	Sacrificed his life to save his unit by remaining behind and covering them as they withdrew
—	Jerome A. Sudut †	Army	Second Lieutenant	Kumhwa, North Korea	September 12, 1951	Company B, 27th Infantry Regiment, 25th Infantry Division	Although wounded he led his men against the enemy and single-handedly defeated a group of them after the rifleman he was with was wounded
—	Henry Svehla †	Army	Private First Class	Korea	June 12, 1952	Company F, 32nd Infantry Regiment, 7th Infantry Division	Charged forward, then smothered a grenade blast with his body
	William Thompson †	Army	Private First Class	Haman, Korea	August 6, 1950	24th Company M, 24th Infantry Regiment, 25th Infantry Division	Killed by an enemy grenade while covering his units withdrawal
—	Charles W. Turner †	Army	Sergeant First Class	Yongsan, South Korea	September 1, 1950	2nd Reconnaissance Company, 2nd Infantry Division	Directed his tank to destroy seven enemy machine gun nests and covered his units withdrawal until killed
	_{Unknown Soldier of the United States}	Unknown	Unknown				
	Archie Van Winkle	Marine Corps	Staff Sergeant	Sudong, Korea	November 2, 1950	Company B, 1st Battalion, 7th Marines, 1st Marine Division (Rein.)	Although severely wounded he continued to fight and lead his men until he passed out from loss of blood
	Miguel Vera †	Army	Private	Chorwon, Korea	September 21, 1952	Company F, 2nd Battalion, 38th Infantry Regiment	Selflessly chose to remain in position during an enemy attack and cover friendly troops' withdrawal from part of "Old Baldy" hill.
	Joseph Vittori †	Marine Corps	Corporal	Hill 749, Korea	September 15, 1951 to September 16, 1951	Company F, 2nd Battalion, 1st Marines, 1st Marine Division (Rein.)	Among numerous accomplishments he was found dead among 200 enemy soldiers that he had singlehandedly killed in fighting
	John S. Walmsley, Jr. †	Air Force	Captain	Yangdok, Korea	September 14, 1951	8th Bombardment Squadron, 3d Bomb Group	Flew his plane through an intense enemy barrage to defend ground forces and maximize enemy damage
	Lewis G. Watkins †	Marine Corps	Staff Sergeant	Korea	October 7, 1952	Company I, 3rd Battalion, 7th Marines, 1st Marine Division (Rein.)	Killed by an enemy grenade when it exploded in his hand
	Travis E. Watkins †	Army	Master Sergeant	Yongsan, South Korea	August 31, 1950 to September 3, 1950	Company H, 9th Infantry Regiment, 2nd Infantry Division	Volunteered to remain and defend his units withdrawal because he knew his injuries would slow them down
	Jack Weinstein	Army	Sergeant	Kumson, Korea	October 19, 1951	Company G, 21st Infantry Regiment, 24th Infantry Division	Alone and unaided, held ground in the face of an enemy attack to permit his platoon to withdraw, even using enemy hand grenades to halt enemy advance.
	Ernest E. West	Army	Private First Class	Sataeri, Korea	October 12, 1952	Company L, 14th Infantry Regiment, 25th Infantry Division	Although wounded he assisted in evacuating the wounded and killed several of the enemy
	Royce Williams	Navy	Lieutenant	Hoeryong, North Korea	November 18, 1952	Fighter Squadron 121, attached to U.S.S. Oriskany	Intercepted and shot down four enemy MiG-15 fighters despite severe damage to his own aircraft, saving the ships of Task Force 77 from attack.
Man with army uniform looking to the side.	Benjamin F. Wilson	Army	Master Sergeant	Hwach'on-Myon, Korea	June 5, 1951	Company I, 31st Infantry Regiment, 7th Infantry Division	Repeatedly risked his life in order for his troops to reorganize and counterattack
	Harold E. Wilson	Marine Corps	Technical Sergeant	Korea	April 23, 1951 to April 24, 1951	Company G, 3rd Battalion, 1st Marines, 1st Marine Division (Rein.)	Served in World War II, Korea and Vietnam War; In addition to the Medal of Honor he received five purple hearts.
	Richard G. Wilson †	Army	Private First Class	Opari, Korea	October 21, 1950	Co. 1, Medical Company, 187th Airborne Infantry Regiment	Sacrificed his life to aid a fellow soldier shielding them from enemy fire with his own body
	William G. Windrich †	Marine Corps	Staff Sergeant	Yudam-ri (Ryudam-ri), Changjin, North Korea (Battle of Chosin Reservoir)	December 1, 1950	Company I, 3rd Battalion, 5th Marines, 1st Marine Division (Rein.)	Sacrificed his life to direct his men and rescue several wounded Marines from a hillside
	Bryant H. Womack †	Army	Private First Class	Sokso-ri, Korea	March 12, 1952	Medical Company, 14th Infantry Regiment, 25th Infantry Division	Sacrificed his life aiding other wounded soldiers
	Robert H. Young †	Army	Private First Class	North of Kaesong, North Korea	October 9, 1950	Company E, 8th Cavalry Regiment, 1st Cavalry Division	Although wounded, repeatedly repelled the enemy and insisted other wounded be treated first

== See also ==
- List of Medal of Honor recipients
- The American Unknown Soldier from the Korean War
