= Edward R. Schowalter Jr. =

United States Army Medal of Honor recipient

Edward Rightor Schowalter Jr.
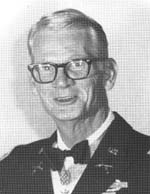
- Medal of Honor recipient Edward Schowalter
- Born: December 24, 1927; New Orleans, Louisiana, US
- Died: November 21, 2003 (aged 75)
- Burial place: Fort Benning Post Cemetery, Georgia, US
- Military career
- Allegiance: United States
- Branch: United States Merchant Marine United States Army
- Service years: 1945 – 1977
- Rank: Colonel
- Units: 1st Battalion, 31st Infantry Regiment, 7th Infantry Division
- Conflicts: World War II Korean War: Battle of Triangle Hill; Vietnam War
- Awards: Medal of Honor; Silver Star; Purple Heart (2)

Edward Rightor Schowalter Jr. (December 24, 1927 – November 21, 2003) was a United States Army officer in the Korean War who received the U.S. military's highest decoration, the Medal of Honor. He was awarded the medal for commanding his company in an assault against a fortified position, and for continuing to lead after being seriously wounded.

== Biography ==
Schowalter was born on December 24, 1927, in New Orleans, Louisiana, to Edward R. Schowalter, Sr., and Ruth Johnson. After graduating from Metairie High School in nearby Metairie in June 1945, he enlisted in the Merchant Marine during the final months of World War II. Afterwards, he attended the Virginia Military Institute in Lexington, Virginia, and upon his graduation in 1951 with a B.S. degree in chemistry he was commissioned a second lieutenant in the U.S. Army. He was later promoted to first lieutenant and served in Korea with Company A, 31st Infantry Regiment, 7th Infantry Division.

On October 14, 1952, near Kumhwa and what is today the border between North and South Korea, Schowalter's company was selected to spearhead an attack on a fortified Chinese position known as Jane Russell Hill. As he led Company A toward the hill, they came under intense small-arms, grenade, and mortar fire. Schowalter received two grazing wounds to his hand and ankle before being shot in the helmet by a sniper. The bullet lodged under the skin in his right ear and knocked him unconscious. When he awoke, he refused medical attention and resumed leading his soldiers forward. When he was wounded in the right side by a grenade, he again turned away medical aid and continued to command Company A until the hill was taken.

For these actions, Schowalter was awarded the Medal of Honor. The medal was formally presented to him roughly four months later by President Dwight D. Eisenhower, during a ceremony at the White House. In his home of Jefferson Parish, Louisiana, a military parade was held in his honor and parish officials gave him a new car, and the mayor of New Orleans, Chep Morrison, gave him the keys to the city.

Schowalter reached the rank of colonel and served two tours of duty in the Vietnam War before retiring in 1977. He graduated from the Infantry School Advanced Course in 1960 and the Army Command and General Staff College in 1964. In addition to the Medal of Honor, Schowalter also received the Silver Star and two Purple Hearts.

Schowalter married after the Korean War and he and his wife, Bonney, had five children. Two of his sons also served in the military. After his retirement, the family settled in Auburn, Alabama. He died at age 75 on November 21, 2003, and was buried at the Fort Benning Post Cemetery in Fort Benning, Georgia.

== Medal of Honor citation ==
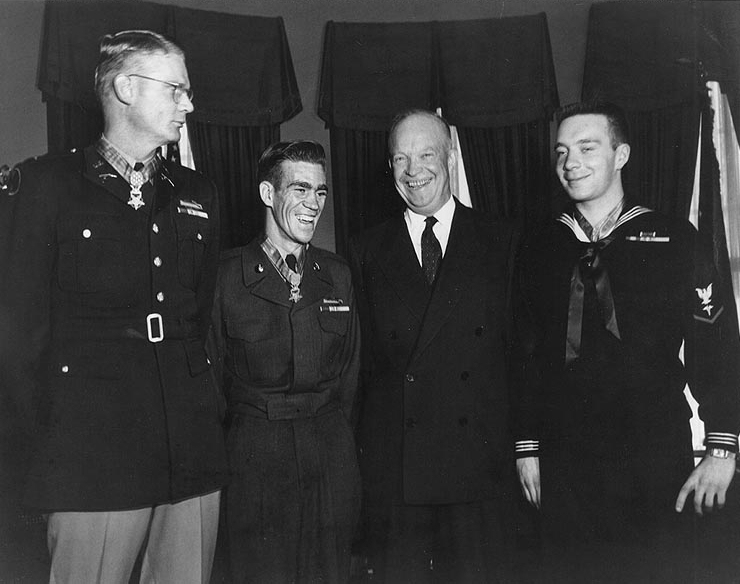
Schowalter stands with two other Medal of Honor recipients shortly after receiving their medals from President Dwight D. Eisenhower. From left: Schowalter, Ernest E. West, Eisenhower, and William R. Charette

Schowalter's official Medal of Honor citation reads:

1st Lt. Schowalter, commanding, Company A, distinguished himself by conspicuous gallantry and indomitable courage above and beyond the call of duty in action against the enemy. Committed to attack and occupy a key-approach to the primary objective, the 1st Platoon of his company came under heavy vicious small-arms, grenade, and mortar fire within 50 yards of the enemy-held strongpoint, halting the advance and inflicting several casualties. The 2d Platoon moved up in support at this juncture, and although wounded, 1st Lt. Schowalter continued to spearhead the assault. Nearing the objective he was severely wounded by a grenade fragment but, refusing medical aid, he led his men into the trenches and began routing the enemy from the bunkers with grenades. Suddenly from a burst of fire from a hidden cove off the trench he was again wounded. Although suffering from his wounds, he refused to relinquish command and continued issuing orders and encouraging his men until the commanding ground was secured and then he was evacuated. 1st Lt. Schowalter's unflinching courage, extraordinary heroism, and inspirational leadership reflect the highest credit upon himself and are in keeping with the highest traditions of the military service.

== See also ==
- List of Korean War Medal of Honor recipients
