= Daniel D. Schoonover =

United States Army Medal of Honor recipient

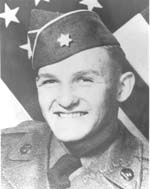
- Medal of Honor recipient Dan Schoonover
- Born: October 8, 1933; Boise, Idaho, US
- Died: July 10, 1953 (aged 19); Yeoncheon, Korea
- Burial place: National Memorial Cemetery of the Pacific, Honolulu, Hawaii
- Military career
- Allegiance: United States of America
- Branch: United States Army
- Rank: Corporal
- Units: 13th Engineer Combat Battalion, 7th Infantry Division
- Conflicts: Korean War: Second Battle of Pork Chop Hill †
- Awards: Medal of Honor; Purple Heart

Daniel Dwain Schoonover (October 8, 1933 – July 10, 1953) was an enlisted soldier of the United States Army during the Korean War and a posthumous recipient of the Medal of Honor at the Second Battle of Pork Chop Hill.

He was killed in action July 10, 1953 and is memorialized in the National Memorial Cemetery of the Pacific, Honolulu, Hawaii; there is also a cenotaph at Morris Hill Cemetery in Boise, Idaho.

== Medal of Honor citation ==
Rank and organization: Corporal, U.S. Army, Company A, 13th Engineer Combat Battalion, 7th Infantry Division

Place and date: Near Sokkogae, Korea, 8 to July 10, 1953

Entered service at: Boise, Idaho. Born: October 8, 1933, Boise, Idaho

G.O. No.: 5, January 14, 1955

Citation:

Cpl. Schoonover, distinguished himself by conspicuous gallantry and outstanding courage above and beyond the call of duty in action against the enemy. He was in charge of an engineer demolition squad attached to an infantry company which was committed to dislodge the enemy from a vital hill. Realizing that the heavy fighting and intense enemy fire made it impossible to carry out his mission, he voluntarily employed his unit as a rifle squad and, forging up the steep barren slope, participated in the assault on hostile positions. When an artillery round exploded on the roof of an enemy bunker, he courageously ran forward and leaped into the position, killing 1 hostile infantryman and taking another prisoner. Later in the action, when friendly forces were pinned down by vicious fire from another enemy bunker, he dashed through the hail of fire, hurled grenades in the nearest aperture, then ran to the doorway and emptied his pistol, killing the remainder of the enemy. His brave action neutralized the position and enabled friendly troops to continue their advance to the crest of the hill. When the enemy counterattacked he constantly exposed himself to the heavy bombardment to direct the fire of his men and to call in an effective artillery barrage on hostile forces. Although the company was relieved early the following morning, he voluntarily remained in the area, manned a machine gun for several hours, and subsequently joined another assault on enemy emplacements. When last seen he was operating an automatic rifle with devastating effect until mortally wounded by artillery fire. Cpl. Schoonover's heroic leadership during 2 days of heavy fighting, superb personal bravery, and willing self-sacrifice inspired his comrades and saved many lives, reflecting lasting glory upon himself and upholding the honored traditions of the military service.

== See also ==
- List of Medal of Honor recipients
- List of Korean War Medal of Honor recipients
