= Whitt L. Moreland =

United States Marine Corps Medal of Honor recipient

Whitt Lloyd Moreland
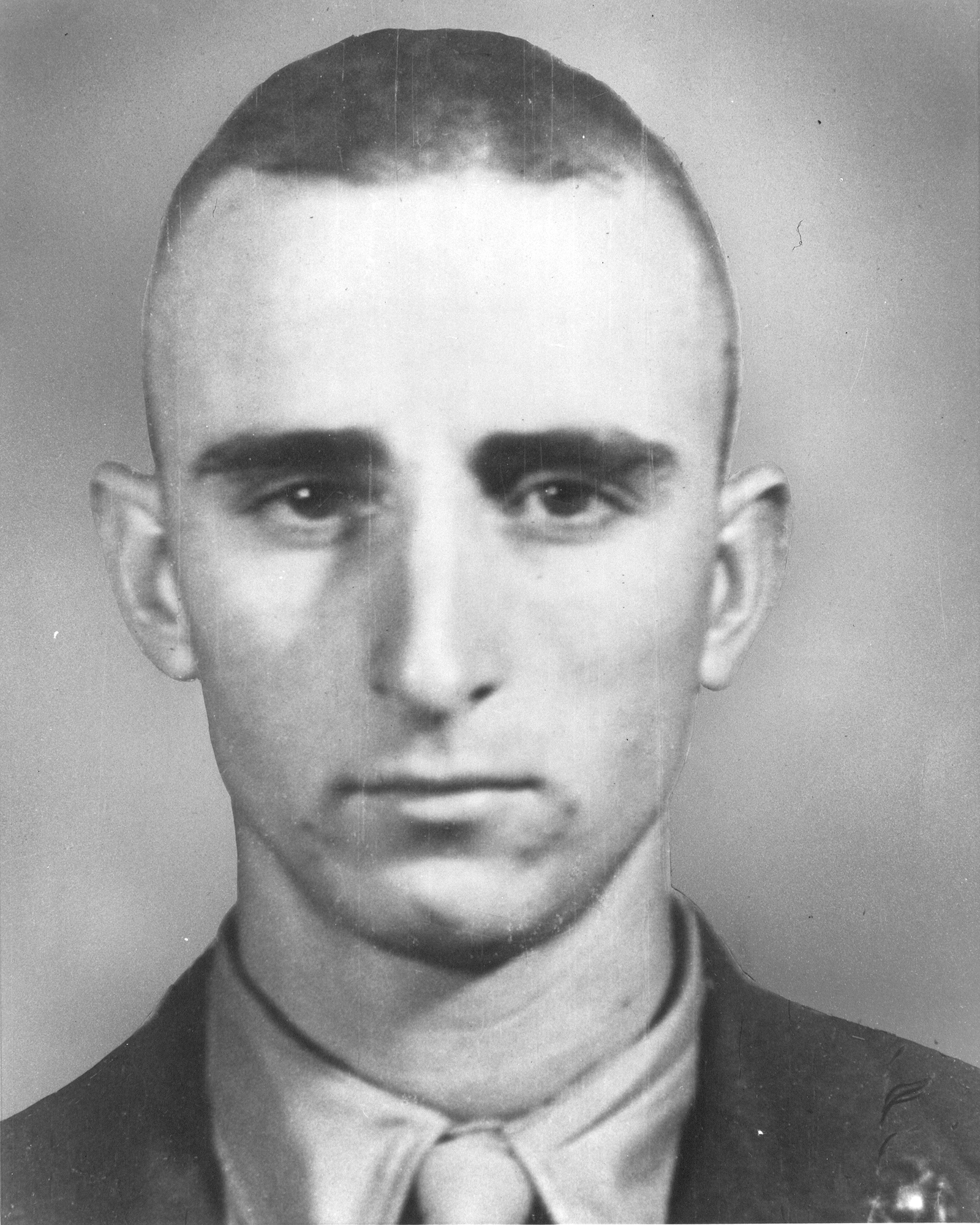
- Whitt L. Moreland
- Born: March 7, 1930; Waco, Texas, United States
- Died: May 29, 1951 (aged 21); Kwagch’i-Dong, Korea
- Burial place: Whittington Cemetery Mount Ida, Arkansas
- Military career
- Allegiance: United States
- Branch: United States Marine Corps
- Service years: 1948–1951
- Rank: Private First Class
- Units: Company C, 1st Battalion, 5th Marines, 1st Marine Division
- Conflicts: Korean War: UN May–June 1951 counteroffensive (DOW)
- Awards: Medal of Honor; Purple Heart

Whitt Lloyd Moreland (March 7, 1930 – May 29, 1951) was a United States Marine who was posthumously awarded the United States' highest military decoration, the Medal of Honor, for sacrificing his life to save the lives of fellow Marines by smothering a hand grenade with his body during the UN May–June 1951 counteroffensive of the Korean War. He was the 17th Marine to be awarded the Medal of Honor during the Korean War.

== Biography ==
Born in Waco, Texas on March 7, 1930, Whitt Lloyd Moreland attended public school in Austin, and graduated from Junction High School in 1948, where he played football for two years. In September 1948, he enlisted in the United States Marine Corps for one year, serving in San Diego and Camp Pendleton, California. Upon discharge he enlisted in the Marine Corps Reserve for six years. On November 30, 1950, he was called to active duty, and received advanced training at Camp Pendleton, California.

PFC Moreland was an intelligence scout attached to the 1st Battalion, 5th Marines, 1st Marine Division when he was killed in action at Kwangch'i-Dong, Korea, on May 29, 1951.

Moreland is buried at Whittington Cemetery in Mount Ida, Arkansas.

There is a monument dedicated to him in Llano, Texas along with others who served in the war.

== Medal of Honor citation ==
The President of the United States takes pride in presenting the MEDAL OF HONOR posthumously to

PRIVATE FIRST CLASS WHITT L. MORELAND
UNITED STATES MARINE CORPS RESERVE

for service as set forth in the following CITATION:

For conspicuous gallantry and intrepidity at the risk of his life above and beyond the call of duty while serving as an Intelligence Scout attached to Company C, First Battalion, Fifth Marines, First Marine Division (Reinforced), in action against enemy aggressor forces in Korea on May 29, 1951. Voluntarily accompanying a rifle platoon in a daring assault against a strongly defended enemy hill position, Private First Class Moreland delivered accurate rifle fire on the hostile emplacement and thereby aided materially in seizing the objective. After the position had been secured, he unhesitatingly led a party forward to neutralize an enemy bunker which he had observed some 400 meters beyond and, moving boldly through a fireswept area, almost reached the hostile emplacement when the enemy launched a volley of hand grenades on his group. Quick to act despite the personal danger involved, he kicked several of the grenades off the ridgeline where they exploded harmlessly and, while attempting to kick away another, slipped and fell near the deadly missile. Aware that the sputtering grenade would explode before he could regain his feet and dispose of it, he shouted a warning to his comrades, covered the missile with his body and absorbed the full blast of the explosion, but in saving his companions from possible injury or death, was mortally wounded. His heroic initiative and valiant spirit of self-sacrifice in the face of certain death reflect the highest credit upon Private First Class Moreland and the United States Naval Service. He gallantly gave his life for his country.

/S/ HARRY S. TRUMAN

== Awards and decorations ==
Moreland's decorations include:

1st row	Medal of Honor		
2nd row	Purple Heart	Combat Action Ribbon Retroactively Awarded, 1999	Navy Presidential Unit Citation
3rd row	Marine Corps Good Conduct Medal	National Defense Service Medal	Korean Service Medal with 1 Campaign star
4th row	Korean Presidential Unit Citation	United Nations Service Medal Korea	Korean War Service Medal Retroactively Awarded, 2003

== See also ==
- List of Medal of Honor recipients
- List of Korean War Medal of Honor recipients
