= Jack Weinstein (Medal of Honor) =

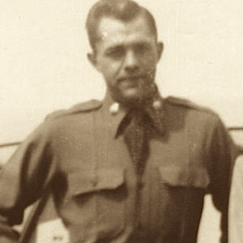
- Born: October 18, 1928; St. Francis, Kansas
- Died: April 20, 2006 (aged 77); Saint Francis, Kansas
- Burial place: Wheeler Cemetery, Wheeler, Kansas
- Military career
- Allegiance: United States
- Branch: United States Army
- Rank: Sergeant
- Units: 21st Infantry Regiment, 24th Infantry Division
- Conflicts: Korean War
- Awards: Medal of Honor

Jack Weinstein (October 18, 1928 – April 20, 2006) was a U.S. Army veteran of the Korean War and a recipient of the Medal of Honor.

== Biographical details ==
Born on October 18, 1928, in St. Francis, Kansas, Weinstein was drafted into the U.S. Army in 1950, serving a year and a half in Korea before settling in St. Francis. Weinstein and his wife had five children, ten grandchildren, and four great-grandchildren.

Weinstein died on April 20, 2006.

== Medal of Honor ==
The bestowal of the Medal of Honor recognized Weinstein for his exceptionally valorous actions on October 19, 1951, near Kumsong, Korea, when his platoon came under enemy attack and Weinstein volunteered to stay and provide cover while his men withdrew. Weinstein killed six enemy combatants and, after running out of ammunition, used enemy grenades around him to keep the enemy forces back. Weinstein held his position until friendly forces moved back in and pushed the enemy back.

Weinstein was posthumously awarded the Medal of Honor by President Barack Obama in a March 18, 2014, White House ceremony.

Weinstein's widow Nancy Weinstein accepted the Medal of Honor on her late husband's behalf in 2014.

The award came through the Defense Authorization Act which called for a review of Jewish American and Hispanic American veterans from World War II, the Korean War and the Vietnam War to ensure that no prejudice was shown to those deserving the Medal of Honor.

=== Medal of Honor citation ===

The President of the United States of America, authorized by Act of Congress, July 9, 1918 (amended by act of July 25, 1963), takes pride in presenting the Medal of Honor (posthumously) to:

JACK WEINSTEIN
United States Army

For conspicuous gallantry and intrepidity at the risk of his life above and beyond the call of duty:

Sergeant Jack Weinstein distinguished himself by acts of gallantry and intrepidity above and beyond the call of duty while leading 1st Platoon, Company G, 21st Infantry Regiment, 24th Infantry Division in Kumsong, Korea on October 19, 1951.

That afternoon, thirty enemy troops counterattacked Sergeant Weinstein's platoon. Most of the platoon's members had been wounded in the previous action and withdrew under the heavy fire. Sergeant Weinstein, however, remained in his position and continued to fight off the onrushing enemy, killing at least six with his M-1 rifle before running out of ammunition. Although under extremely heavy enemy fire, Sergeant Weinstein refused to withdraw and continued fighting by throwing enemy hand grenades found lying near his position. He again halted the enemy's progress and inflicted numerous casualties. Alone and unaided, he held the ground which his platoon had fought tenaciously to take and held out against overwhelming odds until another platoon was able to relieve him and drive back the enemy. Sergeant Weinstein's leg had been broken by an enemy grenade and old wounds suffered in previous battles had reopened, but he refused to withdraw and successfully bought time for his wounded comrades to reach friendly lines.

Sergeant Weinstein's extraordinary heroism and selflessness above and beyond the call of duty are in keeping with the highest traditions of the military service and reflect great credit upon himself, his unit and the United States Army.

== Awards, citations and decorations ==
In addition to the Medal of Honor, Weinstein received:

- Combat Infantryman Badge
- Purple Heart with one Bronze Oak Leaf Cluster
- Presidential Unit Citation
- National Defense Service Medal
- Korean Service Medal with two Bronze Service Stars
- United Nations Service Medal
- Republic of Korea-Korean War Service Medal

== See also ==
- List of Korean War Medal of Honor recipients
