= Hubert L. Lee =

Soldier

Hubert Louis Lee
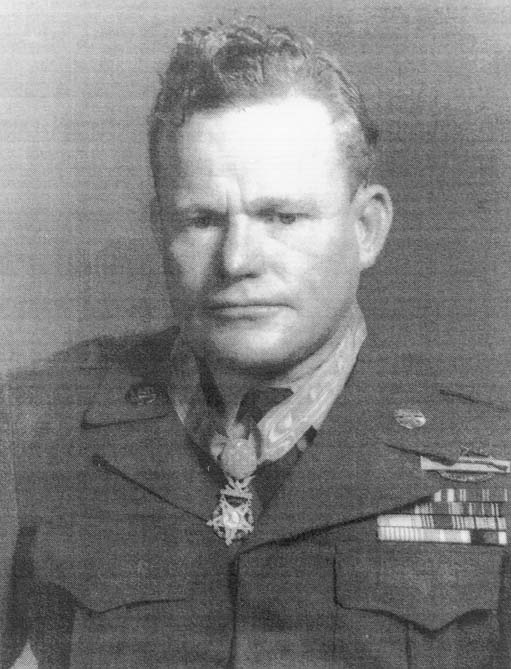
- Hubert Lee
- Born: February 2, 1915; Arburg, Missouri, US
- Died: November 5, 1982 (aged 67); Stoneville, Mississippi, US
- Burial place: Stoneville-Leland Cemetery, Stoneville, Mississippi
- Military career
- Allegiance: United States
- Branch: United States Army
- Rank: Master Sergeant
- Units: Company I, 23rd Infantry Regiment, 2nd Infantry Division
- Conflicts: World War II; Korean War
- Awards: Medal of Honor; Silver Star; Bronze Star; Purple Heart

Hubert Louis Lee (February 2, 1915 – November 5, 1982) was a soldier in the United States Army during the Korean War. He received the Medal of Honor for his actions on February 1, 1951.

He was born in Arburg, Missouri, and moved to Little Rock, Arkansas, with his family, as a boy. He lived in Leland, Mississippi, until his death and was married later in life.

Lee joined the Army in May 1939. After World War II he repaired radio and electronic equipment, a trade he had been taught and learned on the GI Bill. The Stoneville Cemetery is located on Old Leland Road, between Leland and Greenville, MS.

== Medal of Honor citation ==
Rank and organization: Master Sergeant, U.S. Army, Company I, 23rd Infantry Regiment, 2nd Infantry Division

Place and date: Near Ip-ori, Korea, February 1, 1951

Entered service at: Leland, Miss. Born: February 2, 1915, Arburg, Mo.

G.O. No.: 21, February 5, 1952.

Citation:

'M/Sgt. Lee, a member of Company I, distinguished himself by conspicuous gallantry and intrepidity above and beyond the call of duty in action against the enemy. When his platoon was forced from its position by a numerically superior enemy force, and his platoon leader wounded, M/Sgt. Lee assumed command, regrouped the remnants of his unit, and led them in repeated assaults to regain the position. Within 25 yards of his objective he received a leg wound from grenade fragments, but refused assistance and continued the attack. Although forced to withdraw 5 times, each time he regrouped his remaining men and renewed the assault. Moving forward at the head of his small group in the fifth attempt, he was struck by an exploding grenade, knocked to the ground, and seriously wounded in both legs. Still refusing assistance, he advanced by crawling, rising to his knees to fire, and urging his men to follow. While thus directing the final assault he was wounded a third time, by small-arms fire. Persistently continuing to crawl forward, he directed his men in a final and successful attack which regained the vital objective. His intrepid leadership and determination led to the destruction of 83 of the enemy and withdrawal of the remainder, and was a vital factor in stopping the enemy attack. M/Sgt. Lee's indomitable courage, consummate valor, and outstanding leadership reflect the highest credit upon himself and are in keeping with the finest traditions of the infantry and the U.S. Army.

== Awards and Decorations ==
Master Sergeant Lee received the following awards for his service

Badge	Combat Infantryman Badge with star denoting 2nd award		
1st row	Medal of Honor		Silver Star
2nd row	Bronze Star Medal	Purple Heart	Army Good Conduct Medal
3rd row	American Defense Service Medal	American Campaign Medal	European-African-Middle Eastern Campaign Medal
4th row	Korean Service Medal	United Nations Service Medal Korea	Korean War Service Medal
1st row	Presidential Unit Citation		Korean Presidential Unit Citation

== See also ==
- List of Medal of Honor recipients
- List of Korean War Medal of Honor recipients
