= USS William Charette =

United States Navy guided missile destroyer

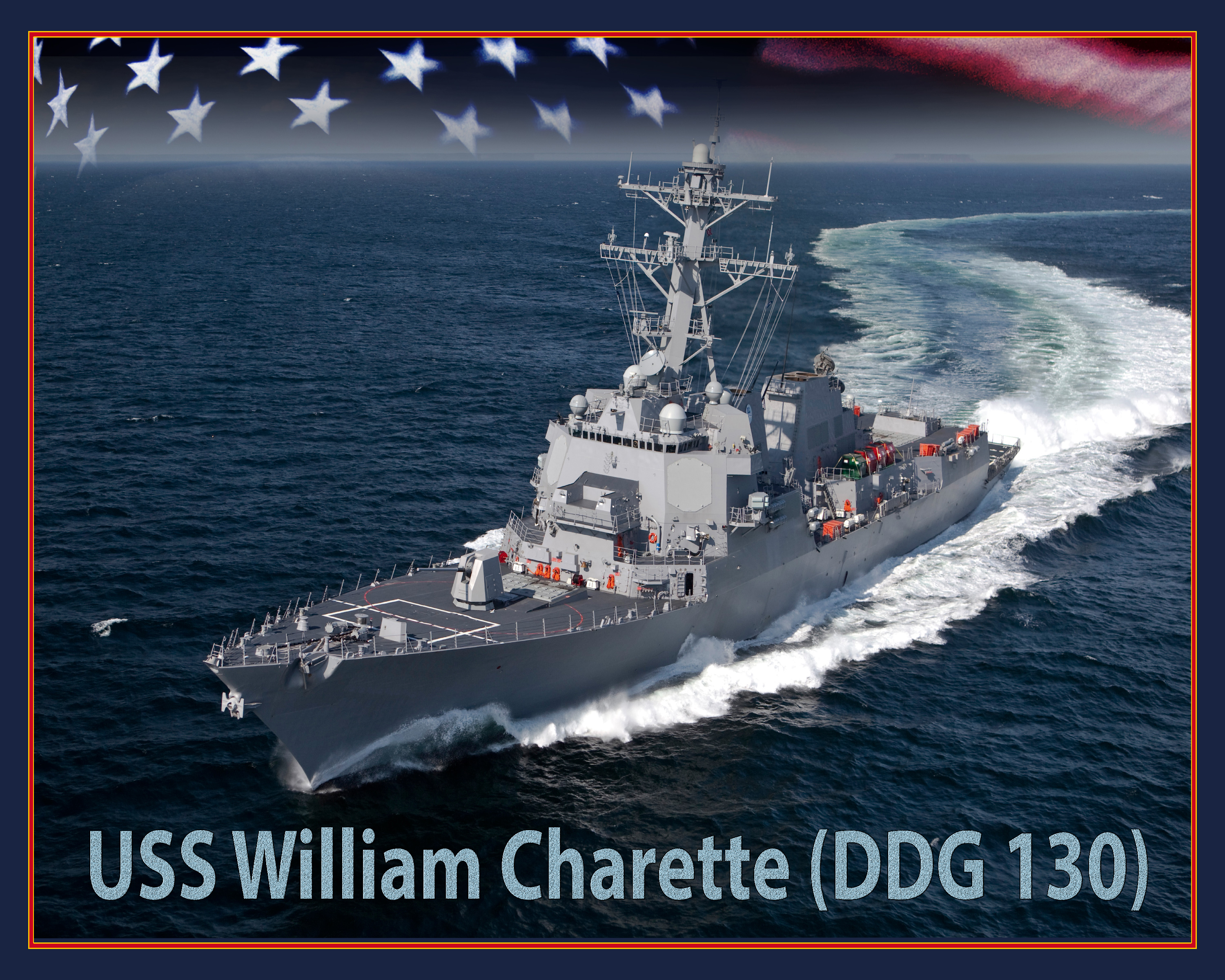
- Graphical depiction of USS William Charette (DDG-130)

History

United States
- Name: William Charette
- Namesake: William Charette
- Awarded: 27 September 2018
- Builder: Bath Iron Works
- Laid down: 29 August 2024
- Christened: 1 August 2026
- Identification: Hull number: DDG-130
- Motto: Valor in service
- Status: Christened
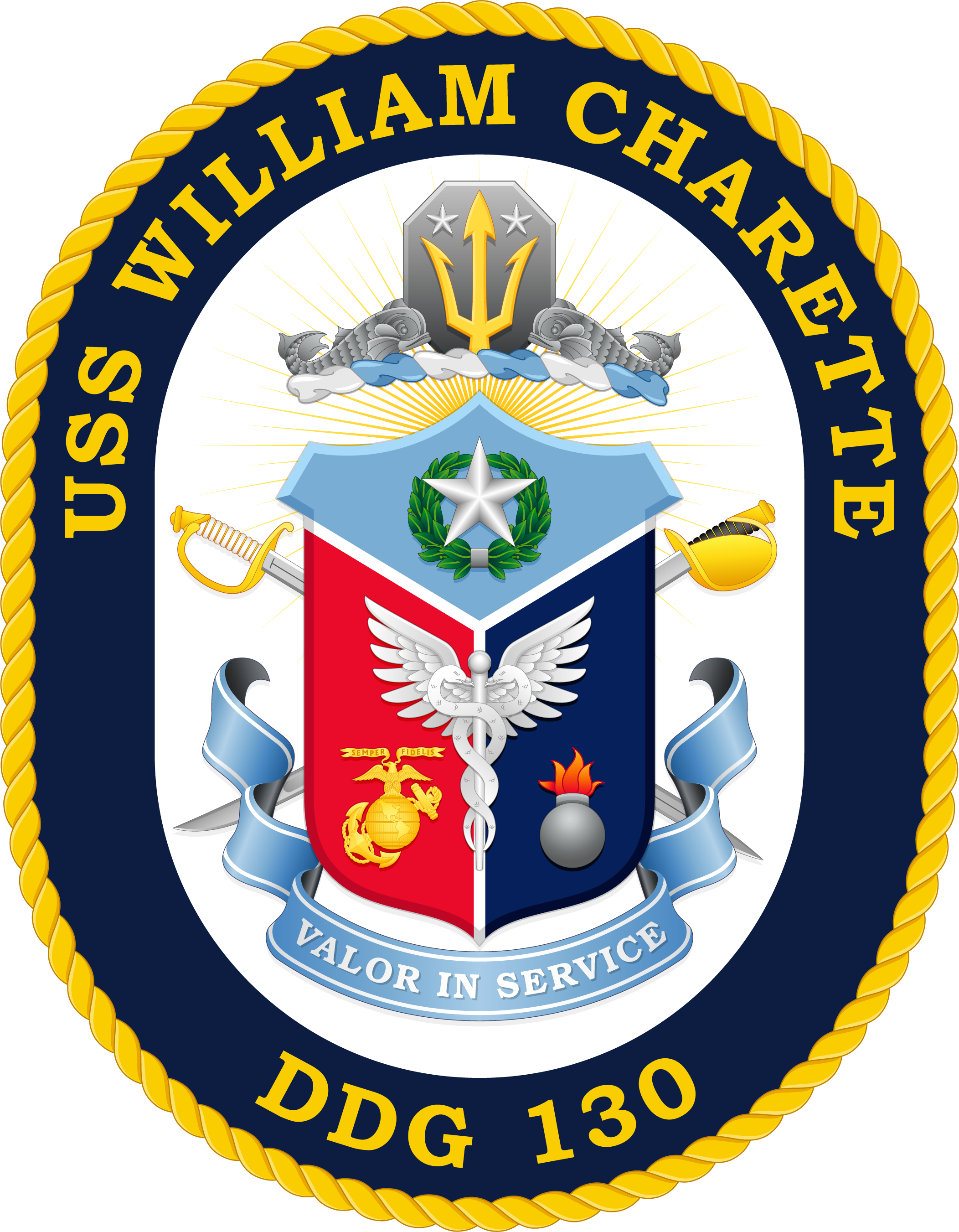
- Badge

General characteristics
- Class & type: Arleigh Burke-class destroyer
- Displacement: 9,217 tons (full load)
- Length: 510 ft (160 m)
- Beam: 66 ft (20 m)
- Propulsion: 4 × General Electric LM2500 gas turbines 100,000 shp (75,000 kW)
- Speed: 31 knots (57 km/h; 36 mph)
- Complement: 380 officers and enlisted
- Armament: Guns: 1 × 5-inch (127 mm)/62 Mk 45 Mod 4 (lightweight gun); 1 × 20 mm (0.8 in) Phalanx CIWS; 2 × 25 mm (0.98 in) Mk 38 machine gun system; 4 × 0.50 in (12.7 mm) caliber guns; Missiles: 1 × 32-cell, 1 × 64-cell (96 total cells) Mk 41 vertical launching system (VLS): RIM-66M surface-to-air missile; RIM-156 surface-to-air missile; RIM-174A Standard ERAM; RIM-161 anti-ballistic missile; RIM-162 ESSM (quad-packed); BGM-109 Tomahawk cruise missile; RUM-139 vertical launch ASROC; Torpedoes: 2 × Mark 32 triple torpedo tubes: Mark 46 lightweight torpedo; Mark 50 lightweight torpedo; Mark 54 lightweight torpedo
- Armor: Kevlar-type armor with steel hull. Numerous passive survivability measures.
- Aircraft carried: 2 × MH-60R Seahawk helicopters
- Aviation facilities: Double hangar and helipad

USS William Charette (DDG-130) is an Arleigh Burke-class (Flight III) Aegis guided missile destroyer of the United States Navy, the fifth Flight III variant. She is named in honor of Master Chief William R. Charette, a Korean War veteran and recipient of the Medal of Honor.

The start of fabrication ceremony took place at the General Dynamics Bath Iron Works facility in Bath, Maine, on 30 November 2020. The keel laying ceremony was held at General Dynamics Bath Iron Works in Bath, Maine, on 29 August 2024. She was christened on 1 August 2026.
