= Leonard M. Kravitz =

American soldier who served in the Korean War

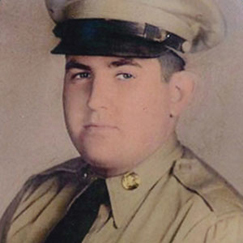
- Kravitz c. 1950
- Born: August 8, 1930; New York City, United States
- Died: March 7, 1951 (aged 20); Yangpyeong County, South Korea
- Burial place: Mount Carmel Cemetery, Queens, New York
- Relatives: Sy Kravitz (brother); Lenny Kravitz (nephew); Zoë Kravitz (great-niece)
- Military career
- Allegiance: United States
- Branch: United States Army
- Rank: Private first class
- Units: 3rd Battalion, 5th Infantry Regiment, 24th Infantry Division
- Conflicts: Korean War †
- Awards: Medal of Honor; Purple Heart

Leonard Martin Kravitz (August 8, 1930 – March 7, 1951) was an American soldier in the United States Army who served in the Korean War. He is a posthumous recipient of the Medal of Honor.

== Early life and family ==
Leonard Kravitz was born and raised in Brooklyn, New York. His parents were Jean (née Kaufman) and Joseph Kravitz. He was the younger brother of filmmaker and TV producer Sy Kravitz, and uncle of musician Lenny Kravitz.

== Medal of Honor ==
On March 6–7, 1951, the position of Kravitz's unit at Jipyeong-ri was attacked by the enemy. When a machinegunner was wounded, Kravitz replaced him, forcing the enemy to direct its efforts against him and helping his comrades to retreat after their positions were overrun. Kravitz was reported to have shouted, "Get the hell out of here while you can!" When American troops retook their positions, they found that Kravitz had killed a large number of enemy soldiers before dying in action.

Kravitz's niece Laurie Wegner accepting the Medal of Honor on her uncle's behalf from President Barack Obama in a March 18, 2014, White House ceremony.

The award of the Medal of Honor was made as a result of the National Defense Authorization Act of 2002 which called for a review of Jewish American and Hispanic American veterans of World War II, the Korean War and the Vietnam War to ensure that no prejudice was shown to those deserving the Medal of Honor. The re-examination of the Medal of Honor process was pursued for over 50 years by Mitchel Libman, who had been Kravitz's childhood friend from Crown Heights, Brooklyn. Libman's research led him to conclude that a number of Jewish recipients of the Distinguished Service Cross should have been nominated for the Medal of Honor instead. After decades of lobbying, Libman convinced Representative Robert Wexler to propose the "Leonard Kravitz Jewish War Veterans Act of 2001". The legislation was ultimately not adopted, but its consideration led Congress to direct the armed forces to re-examine past practices in selecting Medal of Honor recipients. When the decision was made in 2012 to award the Medal of Honor to Kravitz, President Barack Obama phoned Libman personally to inform him.

== Medal of Honor citation ==
Medal of Honor

The President of the United States of America, authorized by Act of Congress, July 9, 1918 (amended by act of July 25, 1963), takes pride in presenting the Medal of Honor (posthumously) to:

LEONARD M. KRAVITZ
United States Army

For conspicuous gallantry and intrepidity at the risk of his life above and beyond the call of duty:

Private First Class Leonard M. Kravitz distinguished himself by acts of gallantry and intrepidity above and beyond the call of duty while serving as an assistant machinegunner with Company M, 5th Infantry Regiment, 24th Infantry Division during combat operations against an armed enemy in Yangpyong, Korea on March 6 and 7, 1951. After friendly elements had repulsed two probing attacks, the enemy launched a fanatical banzai charge with heavy supporting fire and, despite staggering losses, pressed the assault with ruthless determination. When the machinegunner was wounded in the initial phase of the action, Private First Class Kravitz immediately seized the weapon and poured devastating fire into the ranks of the onrushing assailants. The enemy effected and exploited a breach on the left flank, rendering the friendly positions untenable. Upon order to withdraw, Private First Class Kravitz voluntarily remained to provide protective fire for the retiring elements. Detecting enemy troops moving toward friendly positions, Private First Class Kravitz swept the hostile soldiers with deadly, accurate fire, killing the entire group. His destructive retaliation caused the enemy to concentrate vicious fire on his position and enabled the friendly elements to withdraw. Later, after friendly troops had returned, Private First Class Kravitz was found dead behind the gun he had so heroically manned, surrounded by numerous enemy dead. Private First Class Kravitz's extraordinary heroism and selflessness at the cost of his own life, above and beyond the call of duty, are in keeping with the highest traditions of military service and reflect great credit upon himself, his unit and the United States Army.

== Awards and decorations ==

Badge	Combat Infantryman Badge		
1st row	Medal of Honor Upgraded from DSC, 2014	Purple Heart	National Defense Service Medal
2nd row	Korean Service Medal with 1 campaign star	United Nations Service Medal Korea	Korean War Service Medal Retroactively awarded, 2003
Unit awards	Korean Presidential Unit Citation		

== See also ==
- List of Korean War Medal of Honor recipients
