= USS John E. Kilmer =

Guided missile destroyer

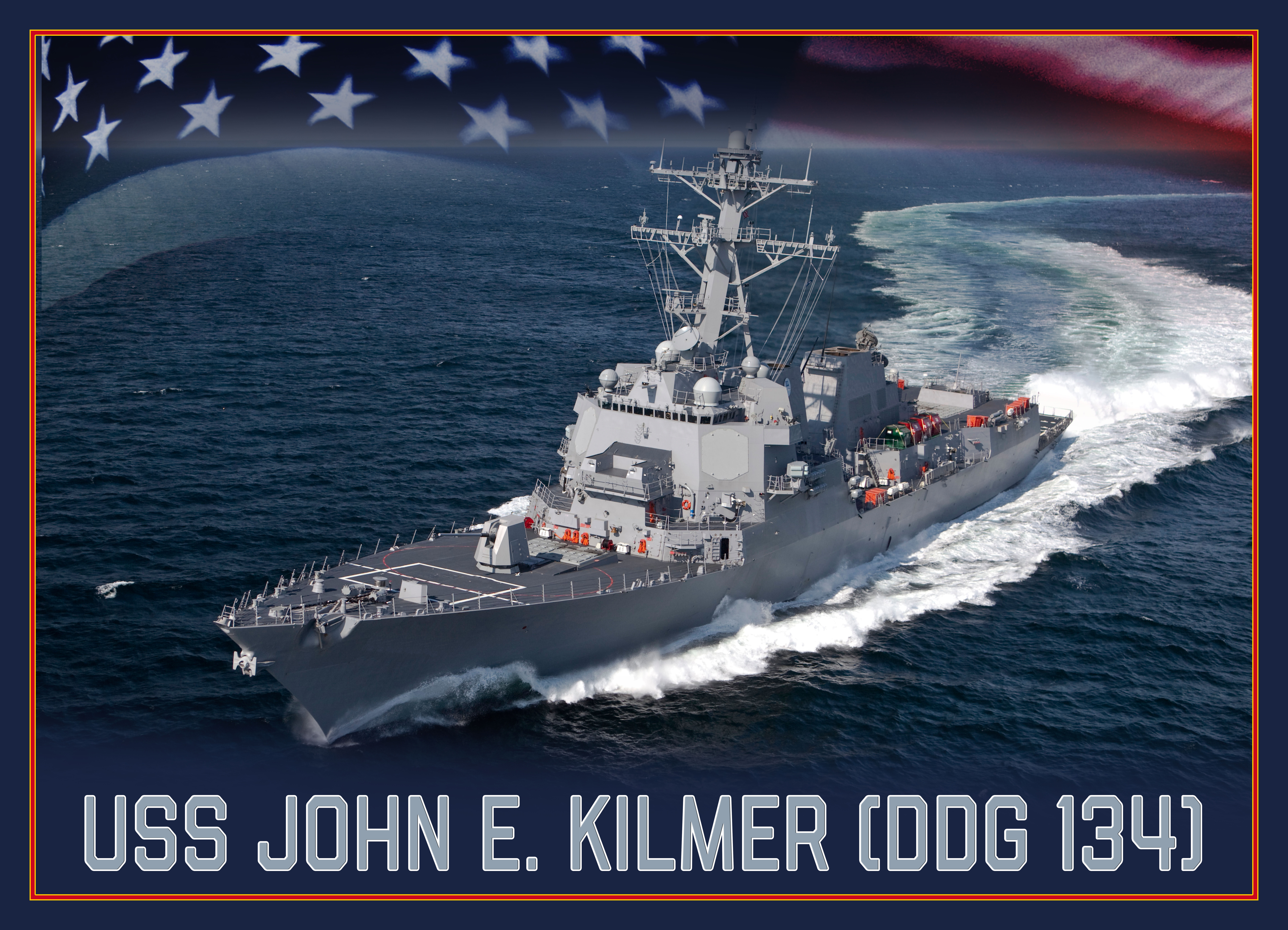
- Graphical depiction of USS John E. Kilmer (DDG-134)

History

United States
- Name: John E. Kilmer
- Namesake: John E. Kilmer
- Awarded: 27 September 2018
- Builder: Bath Iron Works
- Laid down: 10 September 2026
- Identification: Hull number: DDG-134
- Status: Under construction

General characteristics
- Class & type: Arleigh Burke-class destroyer
- Displacement: 9,217 tons (full load)
- Length: 510 ft (160 m)
- Beam: 66 ft (20 m)
- Propulsion: 4 × General Electric LM2500 gas turbines 100,000 shp (75,000 kW)
- Speed: 31 knots (57 km/h; 36 mph)
- Complement: 380 officers and enlisted
- Armament: Guns: 1 × 5-inch (127 mm)/62 Mk 45 Mod 4 (lightweight gun); 1 × 20 mm (0.8 in) Phalanx CIWS; 2 × 25 mm (0.98 in) Mk 38 machine gun system; 4 × 0.50 in (12.7 mm) caliber guns; Missiles: 1 × 32-cell, 1 × 64-cell (96 total cells) Mk 41 vertical launching system (VLS): RIM-66M surface-to-air missile; RIM-156 surface-to-air missile; RIM-174A Standard ERAM; RIM-161 anti-ballistic missile; RIM-162 ESSM (quad-packed); BGM-109 Tomahawk cruise missile; RUM-139 vertical launch ASROC; Torpedoes: 2 × Mark 32 triple torpedo tubes: Mark 46 lightweight torpedo; Mark 50 lightweight torpedo; Mark 54 lightweight torpedo
- Armor: Kevlar-type armor with steel hull. Numerous passive survivability measures.
- Aircraft carried: 2 × MH-60R Seahawk helicopters
- Aviation facilities: Double hangar and helipad

USS John E. Kilmer (DDG-134) is a planned Arleigh Burke-class (Flight III) Aegis guided missile destroyer of the United States Navy. The ship was authorized for construction by Bath Iron Works on 27 September 2018. On 16 October 2019, U.S. Secretary of the Navy Richard V. Spencer announced that the ship will be named in honor of United States Navy Hospital corpsman John E. Kilmer, who was killed in the Battle of Bunker Hill during the Korean War and posthumously awarded the Medal of Honor for his heroic actions in the battle.

== Construction ==
The start of fabrication ceremony took place at a General Dynamics Bath Iron Works facility in Brunswick, Maine, on 8 November 2023.
