= Joe R. Baldonado =

Medal of Honor recipient (1930–1950)

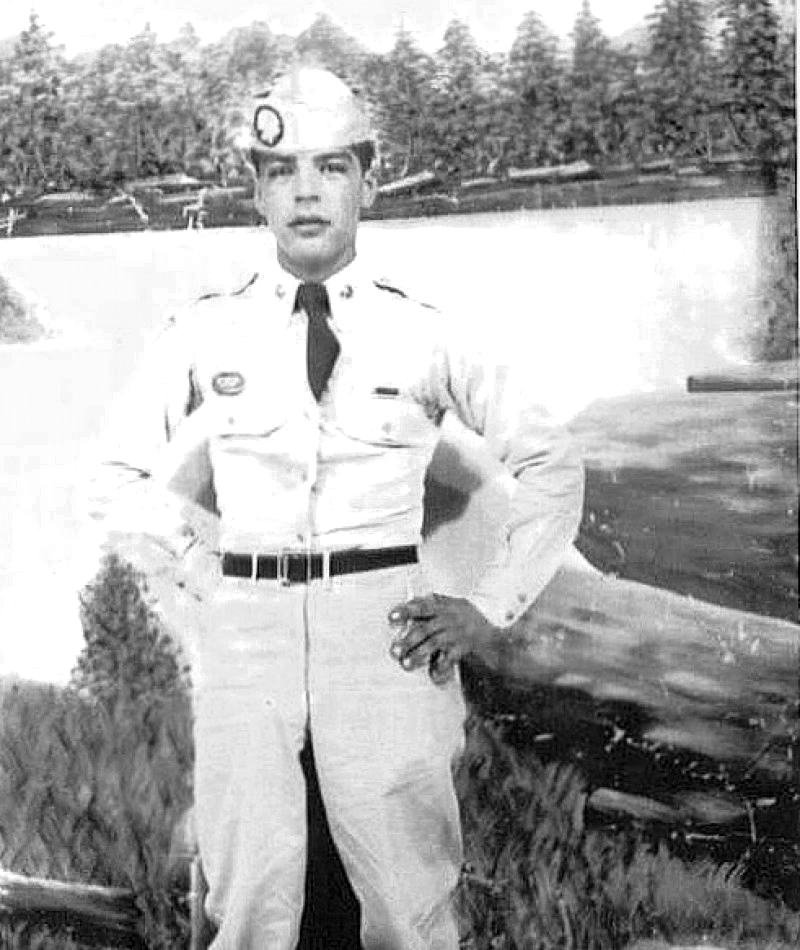
- Born: August 28, 1930; Colorado, U.S.
- Died: November 25, 1950 (aged 20); Ch'ongch'on River, Korea
- Burial place: Arlington National Cemetery, Arlington, Virginia
- Military career
- Allegiance: United States
- Branch: United States Army
- Rank: Corporal
- Units: 1st Battalion, 187th Airborne Infantry Regiment
- Conflicts: Korean War: Second Phase Offensive; Battle of the Ch'ongch'on River †
- Awards: Medal of Honor; Purple Heart

Joe Rodriguez Baldonado (August 28, 1930 – November 25, 1950) was a United States Army paratrooper who received the Medal of Honor for his actions during the Battle of the Ch'ongch'on River in the Korean War.

== Biography ==
Baldonado, the son of Mexican migrant workers, was born in Colorado on August 28, 1930. He joined the U.S. Army as a light weapons infantryman (parachutist) during the Korean War. In that conflict, Baldonado was killed in an action for which he was to posthumously receive the Medal of Honor.

Baldonado's acts of bravery were briefly described in a 1989 book, Disaster in Korea: The Chinese Confront MacArthur.

== Medal of Honor ==
Baldonado's Medal of Honor was accepted on his behalf by his brother Charles in a White House ceremony March 18, 2014.

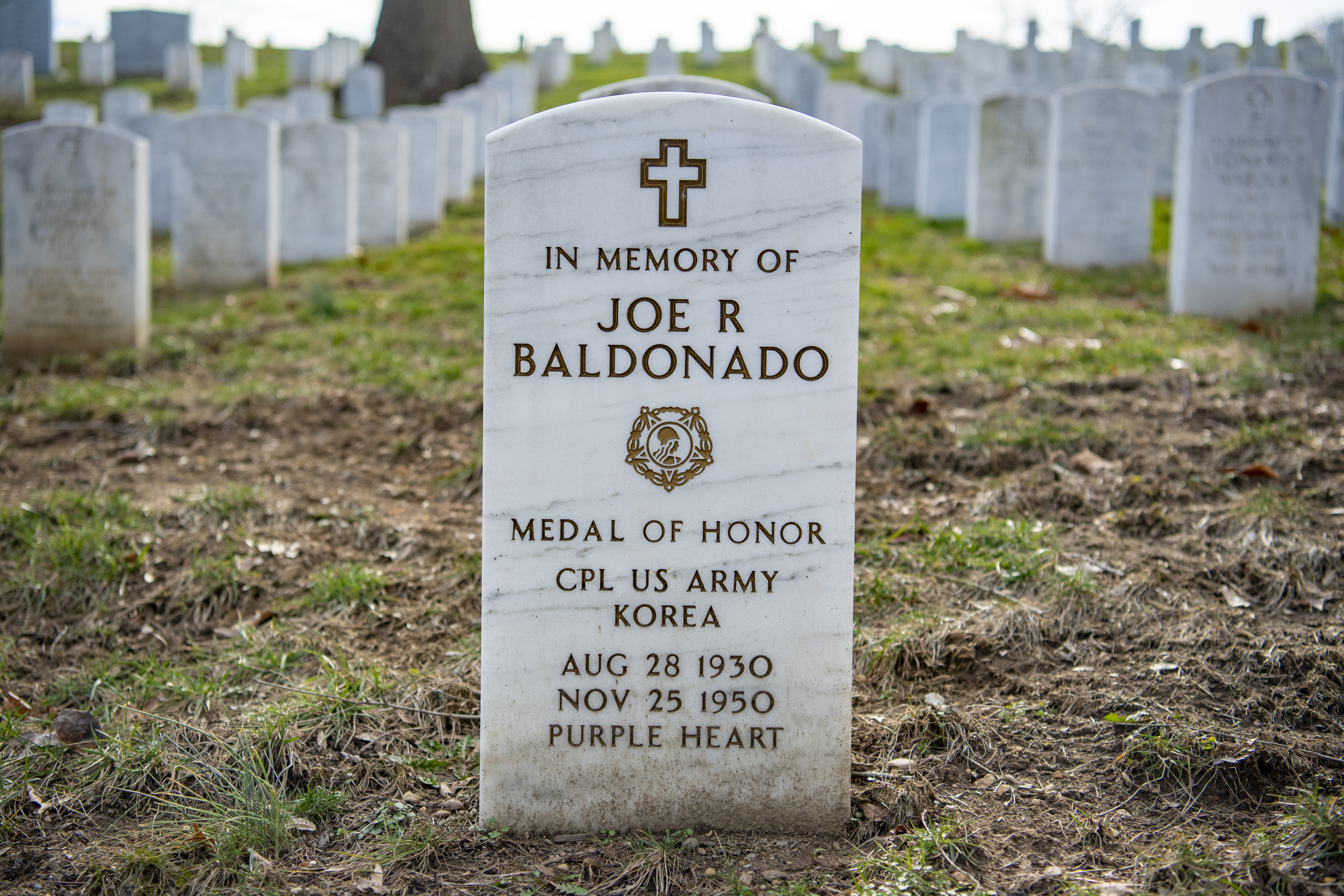
Grave at Arlington National Cemetery

Baldonado distinguished himself on November 25, 1950, while serving as a machine gunner near Kangdong, Korea. Baldonado's platoon was occupying Hill 171 when the enemy attacked. Baldonado was forced to emplace his machine gun in an exposed position; he remained there, cutting down wave after wave of enemy troops even as they targeted his position. During the final assault by the enemy, a grenade landed near Baldonado's gun, killing him instantly.

Baldonado was initially awarded the Distinguished Service Cross, the U.S. Army's second-highest award. In 2014, his award was upgraded to a Medal of Honor through the Defense Authorization Act, which called for a review of Jewish American and Hispanic American veterans from World War II, the Korean War and the Vietnam War to ensure that no prejudice had been shown to those deserving the Medal of Honor.

=== Citation ===

The President of the United States of America, authorized by Act of Congress, July 9, 1918 (amended by act of July 25, 1963), takes pride in presenting the Medal of Honor (posthumously) to:

JOE R. BALDONADO
United States Army

For conspicuous gallantry and intrepidity at the risk of his life above and beyond the call of duty:

Corporal Joe R. Baldonado distinguished himself by acts of gallantry and intrepidity above and beyond the call of duty while serving as an acting machinegunner in 3d Squad, 2d Platoon, Company B, 187th Airborne Infantry Regiment during combat operations against an armed enemy in Kangdong, Korea on November 25, 1950. On that morning, the enemy launched a strong attack in an effort to seize the hill occupied by Corporal Baldonado and his company. The platoon had expended most of its ammunition in repelling the enemy attack and the platoon leader decided to commit his 3d Squad, with its supply of ammunition, in the defensive action. Since there was no time to dig in because of the proximity of the enemy, who had advanced to within twenty-five yards of the platoon position, Corporal Baldonado emplaced his weapon in an exposed position and delivered a withering stream of fire on the advancing enemy, causing them to fall back in disorder. The enemy then concentrated all their fire on Corporal Baldonado's gun and attempted to knock it out by rushing the position in small groups and hurling hand grenades. Several times, grenades exploded extremely close to Corporal Baldonado but failed to interrupt his continuous firing. The hostile troops made repeated attempts to storm his position and were driven back each time with appalling casualties. The enemy finally withdrew after making a final assault on Corporal Baldonado's position during which a grenade landed near his gun, killing him instantly. Corporal Baldonado's extraordinary heroism and selflessness at the cost of his own life, above and beyond the call of duty, are in keeping with the highest traditions of military service and reflect great credit upon himself, his unit and the United States Army.

== Awards and Decorations ==
Baldonado also received the following:

Badge	Combat Infantryman Badge		
1st row	Medal of Honor	Purple Heart	National Defense Service Medal
2nd row	Korean Service Medal with 1 Campaign star	United Nations Service Medal Korea	Korean War Service Medal Retroactively Awarded, 2003
Badge	Parachutists Badge		
Unit awards	Presidential Unit Citation		Korean Presidential Unit Citation

== See also ==
- List of Korean War Medal of Honor recipients
