= Eduardo C. Gomez =

- Born: October 28, 1919; Los Angeles, California, US
- Died: January 29, 1972 (aged 52); Cuajimalpa de Morelos Borough, Mexico
- Military career
- Allegiance: United States
- Branch: United States Army
- Rank: Sergeant First Class
- Units: 3rd Battalion, 8th Cavalry Regiment, 1st Cavalry Division
- Conflicts: World War II; Korean War: Battle of Pusan Perimeter; Battle of Tabu-dong (WIA)
- Awards: Medal of Honor; Bronze Star Medal (2); Purple Heart (3)

Eduardo Corral Gomez (28 October 1919 – 29 January 1972) was a United States Army veteran of the Korean War and a recipient of the Medal of Honor for his actions during the Battle of Tabu-dong on 3 September 1950.

== Biography ==
Gomez was born in Los Angeles, California, on October 28, 1919, He enlisted in the United States Army during World War Two, eventually leaving the service. He re-enlisted on February 9, 1949.

His actions during his time of service in the Korean War resulted in his being posthumously awarded the Medal of Honor on March 18, 2014.

== Medal of Honor ==
Gomez distinguished himself by defending his company as it was ruthlessly attacked by a hostile force, maneuvering across open ground to successfully assault a manned enemy tank. Wounded during his retreat from the tank, Gomez refused medical attention, instead manning his post and firing upon the enemy until his company formed a defensive perimeter.

Gomez' nephew Pete Corrall accepted the Medal of Honor on his uncle's behalf from President Barack Obama during a White House ceremony on March 18, 2014.

The award came through the Defense Authorization Act which called for a review of Jewish American and Hispanic American veterans from World War II, the Korean War and the Vietnam War to ensure that no prejudice was shown to those deserving the Medal of Honor.

=== Medal of Honor citation ===

The President of the United States of America, authorized by Act of Congress, July 9, 1918 (amended by act of July 25, 1963), takes pride in presenting the Medal of Honor (posthumously) to:

EDUARDO CORRAL GOMEZ
United States Army

For conspicuous gallantry and intrepidity at the risk of his life above and beyond the call of duty:

Sergeant Eduardo C. Gomez distinguished himself by acts of gallantry and intrepidity above and beyond the call of duty while serving with Company I, 8th Cavalry Regiment, 1st Cavalry Division during combat operations against an armed enemy in Tabu-dong, Korea on September 3, 1950. That afternoon, while conducting combat patrol, Sergeant Gomez' company was ruthlessly attacked by a hostile force which moved within seventy-five yards of the command post before it was immobilized by rocket fire. However, an enemy tank and multiple enemy machineguns continued to rake the company perimeter with devastating fire. Realizing the tank posed a serious threat to the entire perimeter, Sergeant Gomez voluntarily crawled thirty yards across an open rice field vulnerable to enemy observation and fire, boarded the tank, pried open one of the hatches on the turret and dropped an activated grenade into the hull, killing the crew. Wounded in the left side while returning to his position, Sergeant Gomez refused evacuation. Observing that the tripod of a .30 caliber machinegun was rendered inoperable by enemy fire, he cradled the weapon in his arms, returned to the forward defensive positions, and swept the assaulting force with withering fire. Although his weapon overheated and burned his hands and his painful wound still bled, Sergeant Gomez maintained his stand and, upon orders to withdraw in the face of overwhelming enemy superiority, remained to provide protective fire. Sergeant Gomez continued to pour accurate fire into the enemy ranks, exacting a heavy toll in casualties and retarding their advance. Sergeant Gomez would not consent to leave his post for medical attention until the company established new defensive positions. Sergeant Gomez's extraordinary heroism and selflessness above and beyond the call of duty are in keeping with the highest traditions of military service and reflect great credit upon himself, his unit and the United States Army.

== Honor and awards ==
In addition to receiving the Medal of Honor, Gomez received:

`

| Badge | Combat Infantryman Badge With star denoting 2nd award | | |
| 1st row | Medal of Honor Upgraded from DSC, 2014 | | |
| 2nd row | Bronze Star Medal with "V" Device and 1 Oak leaf cluster | Purple Heart with 2 Oak leaf clusters | Army Good Conduct Medal with 1 Good Conduct Loop |
| 3rd row | American Defense Service Medal | American Campaign Medal | European-African-Middle Eastern Campaign Medal with 1 Campaign star |
| 4th row | World War II Victory Medal | Army of Occupation Medal with 'Germany' clasp | National Defense Service Medal |
| 5th row | Korean Service Medal with 1 Campaign star | United Nations Service Medal Korea | Korean War Service Medal Retroactively Awarded, 2003 |
| Unit awards | Presidential Unit Citation with 2 Oak leaf clusters | | Korean Presidential Unit Citation |

== See also ==
- List of Korean War Medal of Honor recipients
