= John E. Kilmer =

United States Navy Medal of Honor recipient

John Edward Kilmer
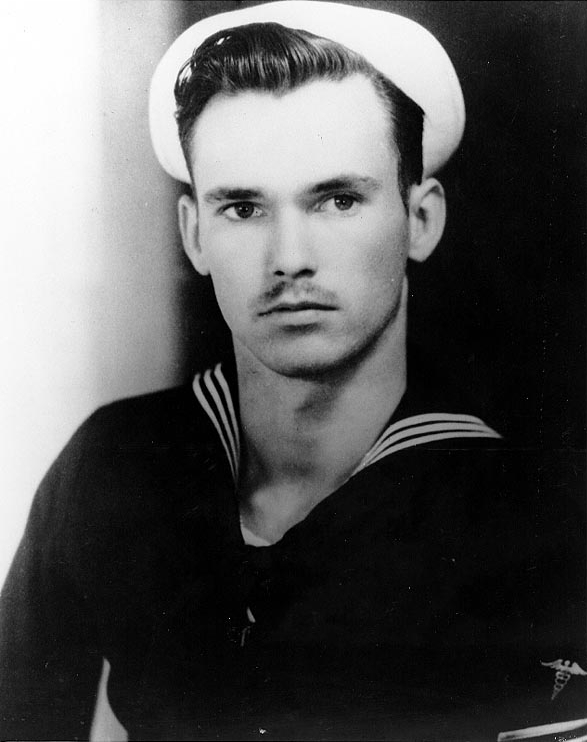
- Born: August 15, 1930; Highland Park, Illinois, U.S.
- Died: August 13, 1952 (aged 21) near Panmunjom, Korea
- Burial place: San Jose Burial Park, San Antonio, Texas, U.S.
- Military career
- Allegiance: United States
- Branch: United States Navy
- Service years: 1947–1952
- Rank: Hospitalman
- Nickname: "Jackie"
- Units: H Company, 3rd Battalion, 7th Marines, 1st Marine Division
- Conflicts: Korean War: Battle of Bunker Hill (DOW)
- Awards: Medal of Honor; Purple Heart (2)

John Edward Kilmer (August 15, 1930 – August 13, 1952) was a United States Navy hospitalman who was posthumously awarded the Medal of Honor for his heroism during the Battle of Bunker Hill while attached to a Marine Corps rifle company in the Korean War.

== Early life ==
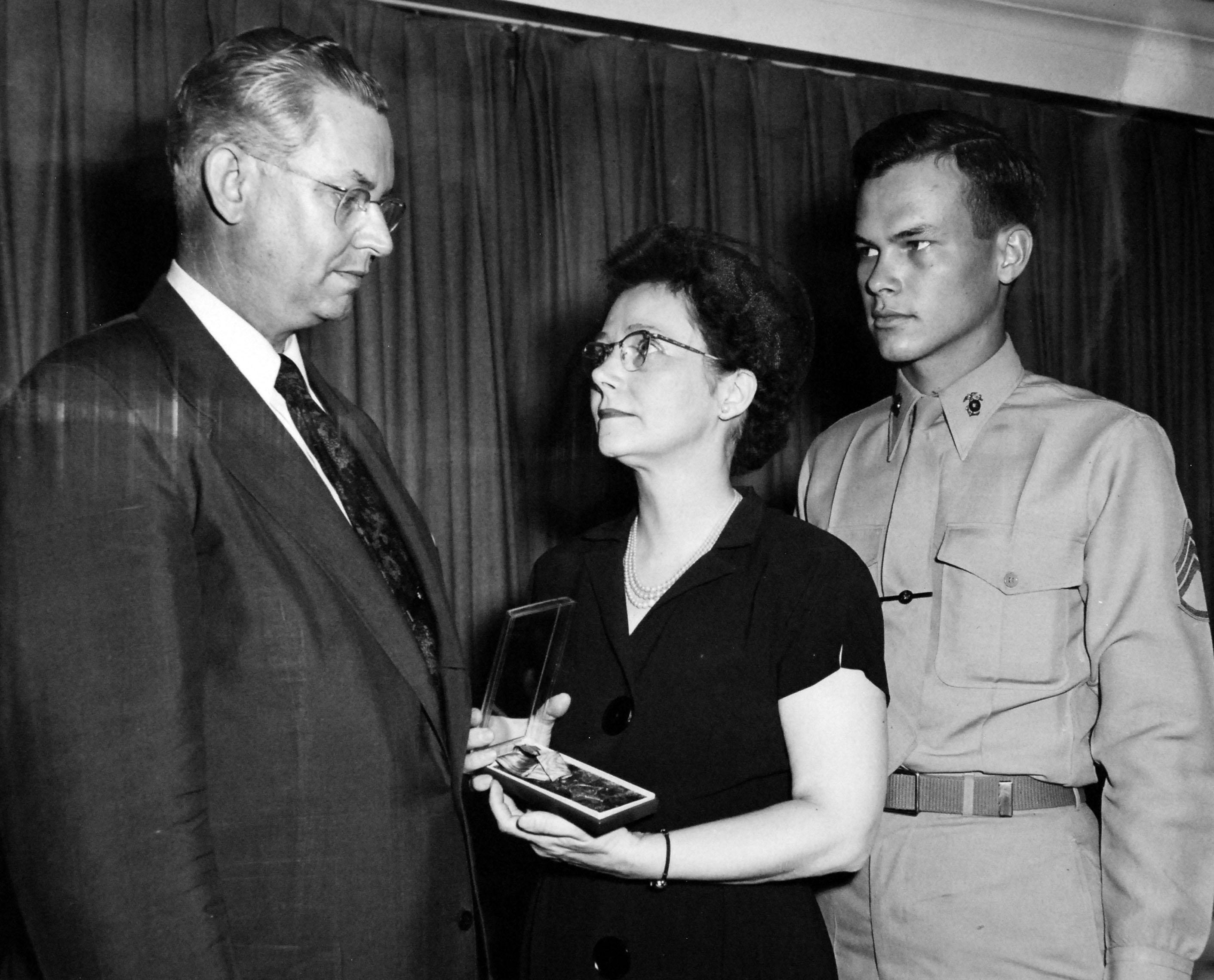
Medal of Honor presentation to the family of John E. Kilmer

Kilmer was born in Highland Park, Illinois. He quit high school at seventeen to enlist in the U.S. Navy on August 16, 1947, from Houston, Texas. He enlisted as an Apprentice Seaman, and after his recruit training, he attended Hospital Corps School, San Diego, California. After graduation in April 1948, he advanced in rate (rank) to hospital apprentice, and then hospitalman on September 1, 1950.

== Korean War ==
Kilmer was assigned to the hospital ship USS Repose when the Korean War began in June 1950. When his 4-year enlistment term expired in August 1951, he reenlisted in the Navy. In April 1952, after running afoul of a superior, Kilmer chose to volunteer to serve as a corpsman with a Fleet Marine Force (FMF) unit. After completing instruction for combat field training in June at the Field Medical Service School at Camp Pendleton, California, he was assigned to the 3rd Battalion, 7th Marine Regiment, 1st Marine Division.

In Korea, Kilmer was a member of H Company, 3rd Battalion, 7 Marines. On August 12–13, 1952, he took part in the attack on Bunker Hill in Korea. He attended to the wounded during the battle and was wounded, then was mortally wounded after using his body to protect a wounded Marine from enemy fire. For his actions on August 13, he was posthumously awarded the Medal of Honor.

On June 18, 1953, Hospitalman Kilmer's mother, Lois Kilmer, was presented with her son's Medal of Honor by Secretary of the Navy Robert Bernard Anderson.

Kilmer is buried in San Jose Burial Park, San Antonio, Texas.

On 16 October 2019, U.S. Secretary of the Navy Richard V. Spencer announced that it will name a new Arleigh Burke-class guided missile destroyer in his honor – the USS John E. Kilmer (DDG-134).

== Medal of Honor citation ==
Hospitalman Kilmer's official citation reads:

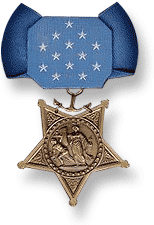

The President of the United States in the name of The Congress takes pride in presenting the MEDAL OF HONOR posthumously to

HOSPITALMAN JOHN E. KILMER
UNITED STATES NAVY

for service as set forth in the following

CITATION:

For conspicuous gallantry and intrepidity at the risk of his life above and beyond the call of duty in action against enemy aggressor forces. With his company engaged in defending a vitally important hill position well forward of the main line of resistance during an assault by large concentrations of hostile troops, HM Kilmer repeatedly braved intense enemy mortar, artillery, and sniper fire to move from 1 position to another, administering aid to the wounded and expediting their evacuation. Painfully wounded himself when struck by mortar fragments while moving to the aid of a casualty, he persisted in his efforts and inched his way to the side of the stricken marine through a hail of enemy shells falling around him. Undaunted by the devastating hostile fire, he skillfully administered first aid to his comrade and, as another mounting barrage of enemy fire shattered the immediate area, unhesitatingly shielded the wounded man with his body. Mortally wounded by flying shrapnel while carrying out this heroic action, HM Kilmer, by his great personal valor and gallant spirit of self-sacrifice in saving the life of a comrade, served to inspire all who observed him. His unyielding devotion to duty in the face of heavy odds reflects the highest credit upon himself and enhances the finest traditions of the U.S. Naval Service. He gallantly gave his life for another.

Harry S. Truman

== Awards and decorations ==
Kilmer's military awards and decorations include:

1st row	Medal of Honor		
2nd row	Purple Heart with 5/16 inch star	Combat Action Ribbon Retroactively Awarded, 1999	Navy Unit Commendation
3rd row	Navy Good Conduct Medal	National Defense Service Medal	Korean Service Medal with FMF Device and 1 Campaign star
4th row	Korean Presidential Unit Citation	United Nations Service Medal Korea	Korean War Service Medal Retroactively Awarded, 2003

== See also ==
- List of Korean War Medal of Honor recipients
