= William E. Barber =

US Marine Corps officer and Medal of Honor recipient (1919–2002)

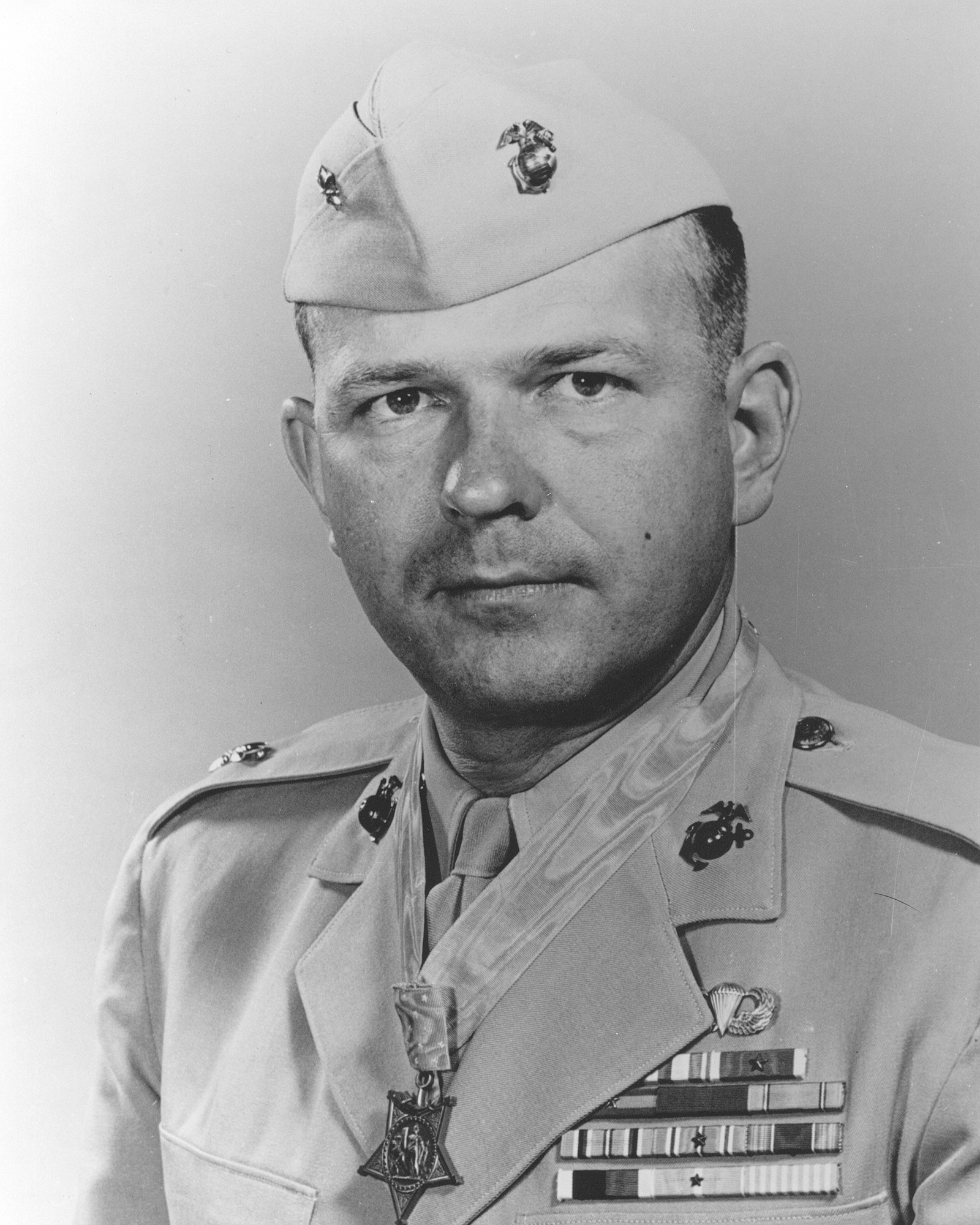
- Born: November 30, 1919; Dehart, Kentucky, U.S.
- Died: April 19, 2002 (aged 82); Irvine, California, U.S.
- Burial place: Arlington National Cemetery
- Military career
- Allegiance: United States
- Branch: United States Marine Corps
- Service years: 1940–1970
- Rank: Colonel
- Commands: 2nd Marine Regiment; 3rd Reconnaissance Battalion
- Conflicts: World War II: Battle of Iwo Jima; Korean War: Battle of Chosin Reservoir; Vietnam War
- Awards: Medal of Honor; Silver Star; Legion of Merit with Combat "V"; Purple Heart (2)

William Earl Barber (November 30, 1919 – April 19, 2002) was a United States Marine Corps colonel. He fought on Iwo Jima during World War II and was awarded the Medal of Honor for his actions in the Battle of Chosin Reservoir during the Korean War.

Then Captain Barber and his company of 220 men held off more than 1,400 Chinese soldiers during six days of fighting in North Korea. Despite the extremely cold weather conditions and a bullet wound to the leg, Barber refused evacuation and an order for his company to withdraw from their mountain pass defensive position, which was surrounded. Barber, aware that leaving would cause 8,000 Marines of his division to be trapped in North Korea, held on to the position with his men, killing over 1,000 enemy troops; only 82 of his men were able to walk away after eventually being relieved.

== Personal life ==
William Earl Barber was born in Dehart, Kentucky, on November 30, 1919. He completed Morgan County High School in West Liberty, Kentucky, and attended Morehead State Teachers College for two years before enlisting in the United States Marine Corps at age 20. Barber was married to his wife, Ione, for 59 years. He had three children, Sharon, Diane, and John, and three grandchildren.

== Marine Corps career ==
Barber enlisted in the Marine Corps in March 1940 and completed his recruit training at Marine Corps Recruit Depot Parris Island, South Carolina, followed by parachute training at the Naval Air Station, Lakehurst, New Jersey. After parachute training, Barber was designated a paramarine and assigned as a parachute instructor at the newly activated Parachute Training School at New River, North Carolina. In May 1943, he entered Officer Candidates School at Marine Corps Base Quantico, Virginia, and was commissioned a second lieutenant on August 11, 1943.

=== World War II ===
Second Lieutenant Barber served with the 1st Parachute Regiment on the West Coast until 1944. Assigned as a platoon commander with Company E, 2nd Battalion, 26th Marine Regiment, 5th Marine Division, at Marine Corps Base Camp Pendleton, California, he embarked for the Pacific area and later took part in the Battle of Iwo Jima. After being wounded, twice, he was evacuated and later returned to his unit, serving as a company commander during the last two weeks of the operation. Shortly after, he was promoted to first lieutenant and again commanded the company during the initial occupation of Japan. He was awarded the Silver Star and two Purple Hearts for his actions on Iwo Jima, in which "he disregarded his own wounds and directed enemy fire to rescue two wounded Marines from enemy territory."

Barber returned to the United States in 1946; he served on recruiting duty in Milwaukee, Wisconsin; served as a rifle company commander with the 8th Marines, 2nd Marine Division, at Marine Corps Base Camp Lejeune, North Carolina; Inspector-Instructor of the Marine Corps Reserve's Company D, 6th Infantry Battalion, in Altoona and Philadelphia, respectively.

=== Korean War ===
In October 1950, Captain Barber was ordered to Korea and took part in the action for which he was awarded the Medal of Honor and the Purple Heart Medal – at the Battle of Chosin Reservoir in November and December 1950. Having only recently arrived and been assigned as Commanding Officer, he led Company F, 2nd Battalion, 7th Marine Regiment in a desperate five-night, six-day defense of a frozen mountain pass vital to the 1st Marine Division's breakout to the sea. The stakes of this battle were high: if Company F did not hold its position at Toktong Pass, 8,000 Marines at Yudam Ni would be cut off from the other 3,000 Marines at Haguru Ri by tens of thousands of Chinese troops. The Marines fought in sub-zero temperatures, outnumbered five to one. Captain Barber was hit on the second night of action (November 29) by a ricochet bullet lodged in his pelvis, fracturing the bone. Despite increasing pain, he refused morphine and continued to lead his troops using a makeshift crutch. The unit was ordered to withdraw and fight back to safety, but with no way to transport the 45 wounded (plus 20 killed) that he had suffered on the first night of battle, and knowing the critical importance of holding the pass, Captain Barber refused to budge. His position was under constant sniper fire during the days, and the enemy broke through the lines three times during five successive nights of relentless attacks numbering hundreds of Chinese, but Barber managed to hold on with the help of air support & resupply during daylight hours, and with the support of marine artillery located nearly seven miles away at Haguru Ri.

After a heroic rescue mission led by Lt. Colonel Ray Davis (who was also awarded the Medal of Honor) finally reached their position and flushed out the surviving Chinese (who were then destroyed by artillery & air support), Captain Barber & the survivors of Fox company joined Davis' "Ridge Runners" and the 1st Division marines in their fighting retreat – reaching Haguru Ri on the night of December 3–4. On December 8, Barber joined thousands of seriously wounded marines being evacuated by air from the newly (& heroically) constructed airstrip at Haguru Ri. He was hospitalized at United States Fleet Activities Yokosuka, Japan until his return to the United States in March 1951. By the end of the battle for Toktong Pass, more than 1,000 enemy soldiers had been killed in the vicinity of "Fox Hill", with an estimated 6500 to 7000 (the entire division which had been tasked with taking out Charlie & Fox companies and with blocking the road between Yudam-ni and Hagaru-ri) having been wiped out. Of Captain Barber's original 246 men (counting at least eight US Navy corpsmen & Marines temporarily attached to the company), only 82 were able to walk away from the battle, and only 60 were still on their feet when they reached Haguru Ri.

In April 1951, he joined Marine Corps Recruit Depot San Diego as a company commander and later became executive officer of the 1st Recruit Training Battalion. He was promoted to major in July 1952.

On August 20, 1952, Major Barber was presented the Medal of Honor by President Harry S. Truman in ceremonies at the White House.

=== Post-Korean War ===
Major Barber completed the Advanced Infantry Course, Fort Benning, Georgia, in March 1954, then served as operations and training officer, 2nd Battalion 2nd Marines at MCB Camp Lejeune. From 1956 to 1958, he served in Thailand as Assistant Naval Attache and Assistant Naval Attache for Air at the American Embassy in Bangkok. During the next four years, he was assigned to Marine Corps Schools at MCB Quantico and served as Assistant Chief Instructor of the Junior School. While there, he was promoted to lieutenant colonel in April 1960.

Again ordered overseas, Lieutenant Colonel Barber joined the 3rd Marine Division on Okinawa, Japan in July 1962 as commanding officer of 3rd Reconnaissance Battalion. Following his return to the United States, he completed his college degree and served at Headquarters Marine Corps as head of the Combat Requirements Section until January 1966, when he became head of the Marksmanship Branch, G-3 Division, and served in this capacity until July 1967. He was promoted to colonel on September 22, 1965.

Transferred to the 2nd Marine Division, Marine Corps Base, Camp Lejeune, North Carolina, Colonel Barber served consecutively as division plans officer, assistant chief of staff, G-2 (Intelligence), and commanding officer of the 2nd Marine Regiment from 19 February 1968 to 13 May 1969.

=== Vietnam War ===
In 1969, he was ordered to Vietnam, where he served his last tour of active duty as Psychological Operations Officer, III Marine Amphibious Force, Military Assistance Command, Vietnam. For his service in this capacity, he was awarded the Legion of Merit with Combat "V."

== Retirement ==
Colonel Barber retired from active duty on May 1, 1970. He then became a civilian-military analyst for the Northrop Corporation. Barber died at his home in Irvine, California, on April 19, 2002, of bone marrow cancer and he was buried at Arlington National Cemetery.

== Military awards ==
Barber's decorations and awards include:

Basic Parachutist Badge
Medal of Honor		Silver Star
Legion of Merit w/ Combat "V"	Purple Heart w/ 5/16" Gold Star	Combat Action Ribbon w/ two 5/16" Gold Stars
Navy and Marine Corps Presidential Unit Citation w/ 3/16" Bronze Star	Marine Corps Good Conduct Medal	American Defense Service Medal
American Campaign Medal	Asiatic-Pacific Campaign Medal w/ 3/16" Bronze Star	World War II Victory Medal
Army of Occupation Medal w/ 'Japan' clasp	National Defense Service Medal w/ 3/16" Bronze Star	Korean Service Medal w/ three 3/16" Bronze Stars
Vietnam Service Medal w/ 3/16" Bronze Star	Republic of Korea Presidential Unit Citation	Republic of Vietnam Gallantry Cross Unit Citation
United Nations Korea Medal	Vietnam Campaign Medal	Republic of Korea War Service Medal

=== Medal of Honor citation ===
For his actions at the Chosin Reservoir, Korea from November 28, to December 2, 1950, Barber was awarded the Medal of Honor. His citation reads:

The President of the United States in the name of The Congress takes pleasure in presenting the MEDAL OF HONOR to

CAPTAIN WILLIAM E. BARBER
UNITED STATES MARINE CORPS

for service as set forth in the following CITATION:

For conspicuous gallantry and intrepidity at the risk of his life above and beyond the call of duty as Commanding Officer of Company F, Second Battalion, Seventh Marines, First Marine Division (Reinforced), in action against enemy aggressor forces in Korea from November 28, to December 2, 1950. Assigned to defend a three-mile mountain pass along the division's main supply line and commanding the only route of approach in the march from Yudam-Ni to Hagaru-ri, Captain Barber took position with his battle weary troops and, before nightfall, had dug in and set up a defense along the frozen snow-covered hillside. When a force of estimated regimental strength savagely attacked during the night, inflicting heavy casualties and finally surrounding his position following a bitterly fought seven-hour conflict, Captain Barber, after repulsing the enemy, gave assurance that he could hold if supplied by air drops and requested permission to stand fast when orders were received by radio to fight his way back to a relieving force after two reinforcing units had been driven back under fierce resistance in their attempts to reach the isolated troops. Aware that leaving the position would sever contact with the 8,000 Marines trapped at Yudam-ni and jeopardize their chances of joining the 3,000 more awaiting their arrival in Hagaru-ri for the continued drive to the sea, he chose to risk loss of his command rather than sacrifice more men if the enemy seized control and forced a renewed battle to regain the position, or abandon his many wounded who were unable to walk. Although severely wounded in the leg the early morning of the 29th, Captain Barber continued to maintain personal control, often moving up and down the lines on a stretcher to direct the defense and consistently encouraging and inspiring his men to supreme efforts despite the staggering opposition. Waging desperate battle throughout five days and six nights of repeated onslaughts launched by the fanatical aggressors, he and his heroic command accounted for approximately 1,000 enemy dead in this epic stand in bitter sub-zero weather, and when the company was relieved, only 82 of his original 220 men were able to walk away from the position so valiantly defended against insuperable odds. His profound faith and courage, great personal valor and unwavering fortitude were decisive factors in the successful withdrawal of the division from the deathtrap in the Chosin Reservoir sector and reflect the highest credit upon Captain Barber, his intrepid officers and men and the United States Naval Service.

=== Silver Star citation ===
Citation:

The President of the United States of America takes pleasure in presenting the Silver Star to First Lieutenant William Earl Barber (MCSN: 0-28331), United States Marine Corps, for conspicuous gallantry and intrepidity as a Platoon Leader of Company E, Second Battalion, Twenty-Sixth Marines, FIFTH Marine Division, in action against enemy Japanese forces on Iwo Jima, Volcano Islands, on 22 February 1945. When two men of his platoon were wounded while advancing beyond the company's front line during an attack against strongly-defended hostile positions, First Lieutenant Barber boldly moved forward into the enemy-held territory despite his own wounds and carried both Marines to safety in the face of direct Japanese fire. His courageous determination and devotion to duty were in keeping with the highest traditions of the United States Naval Service.

== Namesakes ==
The following have been named in honor of Medal of Honor recipient William Barber:

- Marine Corps League Detachment 1110 Sandpoint, Idaho
- Barber Fitness Center, Marine Corps Base, Quantico, Virginia.
- Colonel Bill Barber Marine Corps Memorial Park, Irvine, California.
- Camp Barber, Helmand Province, Afghanistan.
- Barber Bridge, Morgan County, Kentucky.
- Barber Hill, Marine Corps Base, Quantico, Virginia.

== See also ==
- List of Medal of Honor recipients
- List of Korean War Medal of Honor recipients
