= Paul Van Riper =

United States Marine Corps general

Paul K. Van Riper
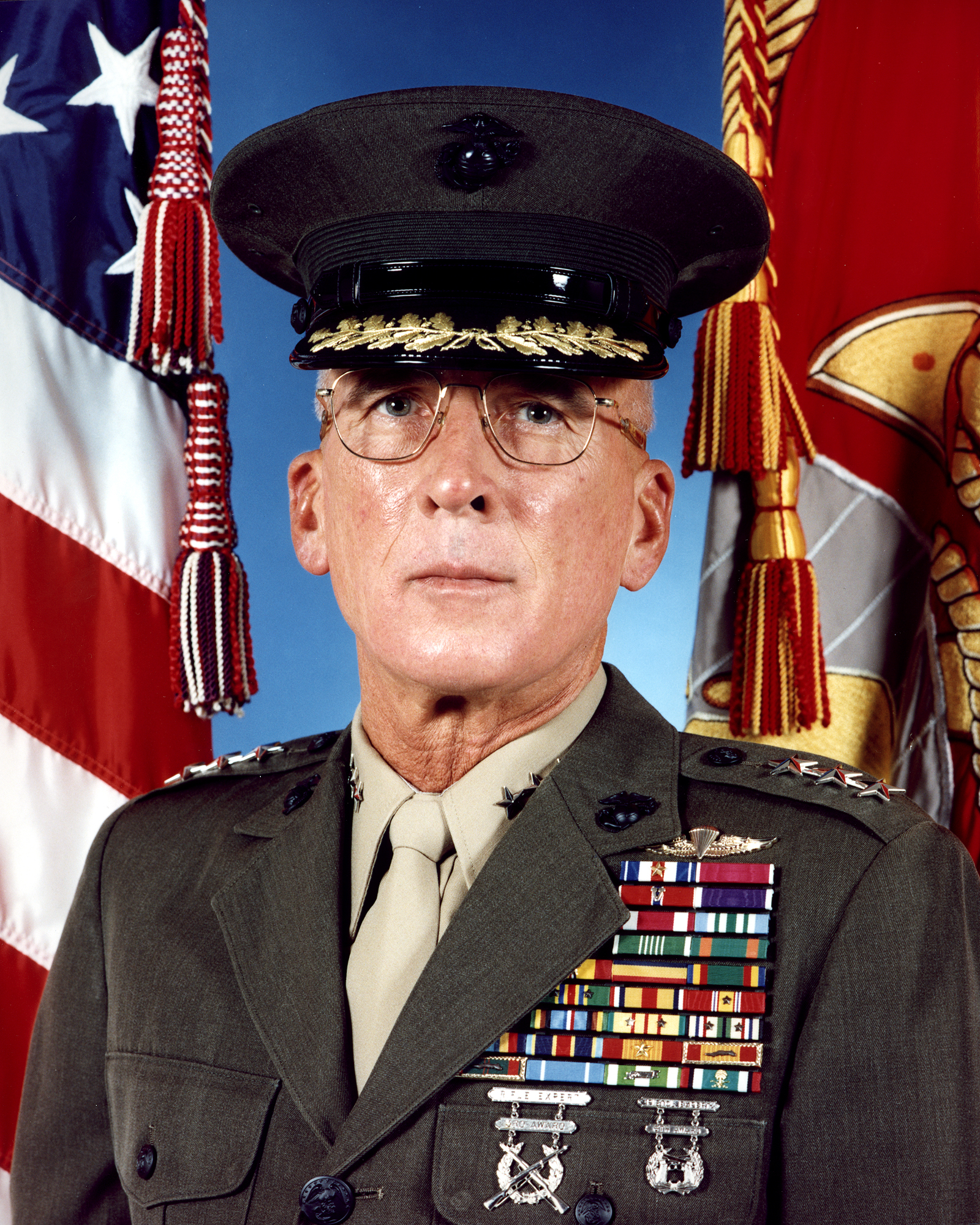
- Born: July 5, 1938 (age 88); Brownsville, Pennsylvania, U.S.
- Military career
- Allegiance: United States
- Branch: United States Marine Corps
- Service years: 1956–1997
- Rank: Lieutenant general
- Commands: 2nd Battalion, 7th Marines; 4th Marine Regiment; Marine Corps University; 2nd Marine Division; Marine Corps Combat Development Command
- Conflicts: Vietnam War; Gulf War
- Awards: Navy Distinguished Service Medal; Silver Star (2); Legion of Merit; Bronze Star Medal with Combat "V"; Purple Heart
- Other work: Marine Corps Heritage Foundation

Paul K. Van Riper (born July 5, 1938) is a retired United States Marine lieutenant general. Van Riper was a combat veteran, who was twice awarded the Silver Star for his heroic actions during the Vietnam War. At the time of his retirement, Van Riper was serving as the Commanding General, 2nd Marine Division and Marine Corps Combat Development Command, Quantico, Virginia. Since his retirement, Van Riper has served on several advisory boards and panels.

== Early life ==
Paul K. Van Riper was born on July 5, 1938, in Brownsville, Pennsylvania. He has a twin brother, James.

== Marine Corps career ==
Van Riper enlisted in the Marine Corps Reserve and underwent recruit training at the Marine Corps Recruit Depot Parris Island, South Carolina, in the fall of 1956. He joined Officer Candidate Course in June 1963 and was commissioned a second lieutenant in November 1963. He completed the Basic School at MCB Quantico and received his first assignment to 1st Battalion, 8th Marines, 2nd Marine Division where he served as platoon commander and company executive officer.

In late 1965, Van Riper served in the Republic of Vietnam as an advisor with the Vietnamese Marine Corps. He was wounded while attacking a North Vietnamese Army (NVA) machine gun in a rice paddy outside Saigon, and evacuated on February 7, 1966. Van Riper served as an instructor at the Basic school then was a student in the Amphibious Warfare School. He was next assigned back to the Republic of Vietnam as a company commander and an assistant operations officer with the 3rd Battalion, 7th Marines, 1st Marine Division. He commanded the battalion's Mike Company in South Vietnam in 1968.

As a lieutenant colonel, Van Riper was a student in the College of Naval Command and Staff, Naval War College from August 1977 until June 1978, earning a master's degree. He later served in Egypt, Israel, Lebanon and Okinawa. Van Riper assumed duties of Commanding Officer, Marine Barracks, Naval Air Station, Cecil Field, Florida, from 1979 to 1981. As a colonel, Van Riper attended the Army War College in Carlisle, Pennsylvania, from August 1981 until June 1982. Van Riper assumed command of the 2nd Battalion, 7th Marine Regiment from May 1983 to August 1984 and later commanded the 4th Marines from June 1985 to December 1986. Van Riper served temporarily as a member of the MARCENT/I Marine Expeditionary Force staff during Operations Desert Shield and Desert Storm from January to March 1991. Van Riper served as Commanding General, 2nd Marine Division at Camp Lejeune from 25 June 1991 to 3 April 1993. Van Riper relinquished his command to Major General Richard I. Neal.

Returning to Washington, D.C., Van Riper served as Assistant Chief of Staff, Command, Control, Communications, and Computer and as Director of Marine Corps Intelligence from April 1993 until July 1995. He was advanced to lieutenant general and assumed his last post on July 13, 1995. At this post Van Riper was an honorary member of the Provost Marshal Office, and spent some of his lunch breaks issuing speeding tickets across MCB Quantico. Van Riper retired on 1 October 1997, after more than 41 years of service. He was decorated with Navy Distinguished Service Medal at his retirement ceremony.

== Post-retirement ==
Van Riper played the Red Team opposing force commander in the Millennium Challenge 2002 wargame. He easily sank a whole carrier battle group in the simulation with an inferior Middle Eastern "red" team in the first two days.

Van Riper adopted an asymmetric strategy. In particular, he used old methods to evade his opponent's sophisticated electronic surveillance network, using virtual motorcycle messengers to instantaneously transmit orders to front-line troops, World War II light signals to launch airplanes without radio communications, and fishing vessels as launching platforms for anti-ship missiles that outweighed the platforms themselves. He used a fleet of small boats to determine the position of the opponent's fleet by the second day of the exercise. In a preemptive strike, he launched a massive salvo of cruise missiles that overwhelmed the Blue forces' electronic sensors and destroyed sixteen warships. These included one aircraft carrier, ten cruisers, and five out of six amphibious ships. An equivalent success in a real conflict would have resulted in the deaths of over 20,000 service personnel. Soon after the cruise missile offensive, another significant portion of the opposing navy was "sunk" by an armada of small Red boats, which carried out both conventional and suicide attacks that capitalized on Blue's inability to detect them as well as expected.

Such defeat can be attributed to various shortfall in simulation capabilities and design that significantly hindered Blueforce fighting and command capabilities. Examples include: a time lag in intelligence, surveillance, and reconnaissance information being forwarded to the Blueforce by the simulation master, various glitches that limited Blue ships point-defense capabilities and error in the simulation which placed ships unrealistically close to Red assets.

After the simulation was restarted with different parameters, he claimed that the wargame had been fixed to falsely validate the current doctrine of the U.S. Navy. He was also critical of plans for the occupation of Iraq and their implementation following the Iraq War. On April 24, 2006, he joined several other retired generals in calling for then-U.S. Secretary of Defense and Iraq War architect Donald Rumsfeld's resignation.

Van Riper currently resides in Williamsburg, Virginia, in the Ford's Colony community.

Paul K. Van Riper authored "Planning For and Applying Military Force: An Examination of Terms," a Strategic Studies Institute (SSI) publication where he critiques joint doctrine's definitions for terms like strategy, center of gravity, and decisive point, arguing they often confuse rather than clarify, drawing from historical concepts by Clausewitz and Sun Tzu to suggest improvements for military planning. The paper highlights issues with current terminology and emphasizes understanding foundational concepts for effective military action.

== Decorations and awards ==
General Van Ripers's military awards include:

Navy and Marine Corps Parachutist Insignia
1st Row	Navy Distinguished Service Medal		Silver Star Medal with 1 gold 5/16 inch star	
2nd Row	Legion of Merit	Bronze Star Medal with Combat "V"	Purple Heart Medal	Meritorious Service Medal
3rd Row	Joint Service Commendation Medal	Army Commendation Medal	Navy and Marine Corps Achievement Medal	Combat Action Ribbon with 1 gold 5/16 inch star
4th Row	Presidential Unit Citation	Navy Unit Commendation	Navy Meritorious Unit Commendation with 2 bronze service stars	Selected Marine Corps Reserve Medal
5th Row	National Defense Service Medal with 1 bronze service star	Armed Forces Expeditionary Medal	Vietnam Service Medal with 1 silver and 1 bronze service star	Southwest Asia Service Medal with 2 bronze service stars
6th Row	Navy Sea Service Deployment Ribbon	Navy & Marine Corps Overseas Service Ribbon	Vietnam Gallantry Cross with 1 gold star	Vietnam Gallantry Cross Unit Citation with palm and frame
7th Row	Vietnam Civil Actions Unit Citation with palm and frame	United Nations Medal	Vietnam Campaign Medal with 1960's device	Kuwait Liberation Medal (Saudi Arabia)

He is a graduate of the Army's Airborne and Ranger Schools.

- Note: The gold US Navy Parachute Rigger badge was worn unofficially by USMC personnel in place of US Army parachutist badge from 1942 to 1963 before it officially became the Navy and Marine Corps Parachutist insignia on 12 July 1963 per BuPers Notice 1020. Members of the Marine Corps who attended jump school before 1963 were issued the silver Army parachutist badge, but may be depicted wearing the gold Navy Parachute Rigger badge as it was common practice during this time period.
