= Daniel P. Matthews =

United States Marine Corps Medal of Honor recipient

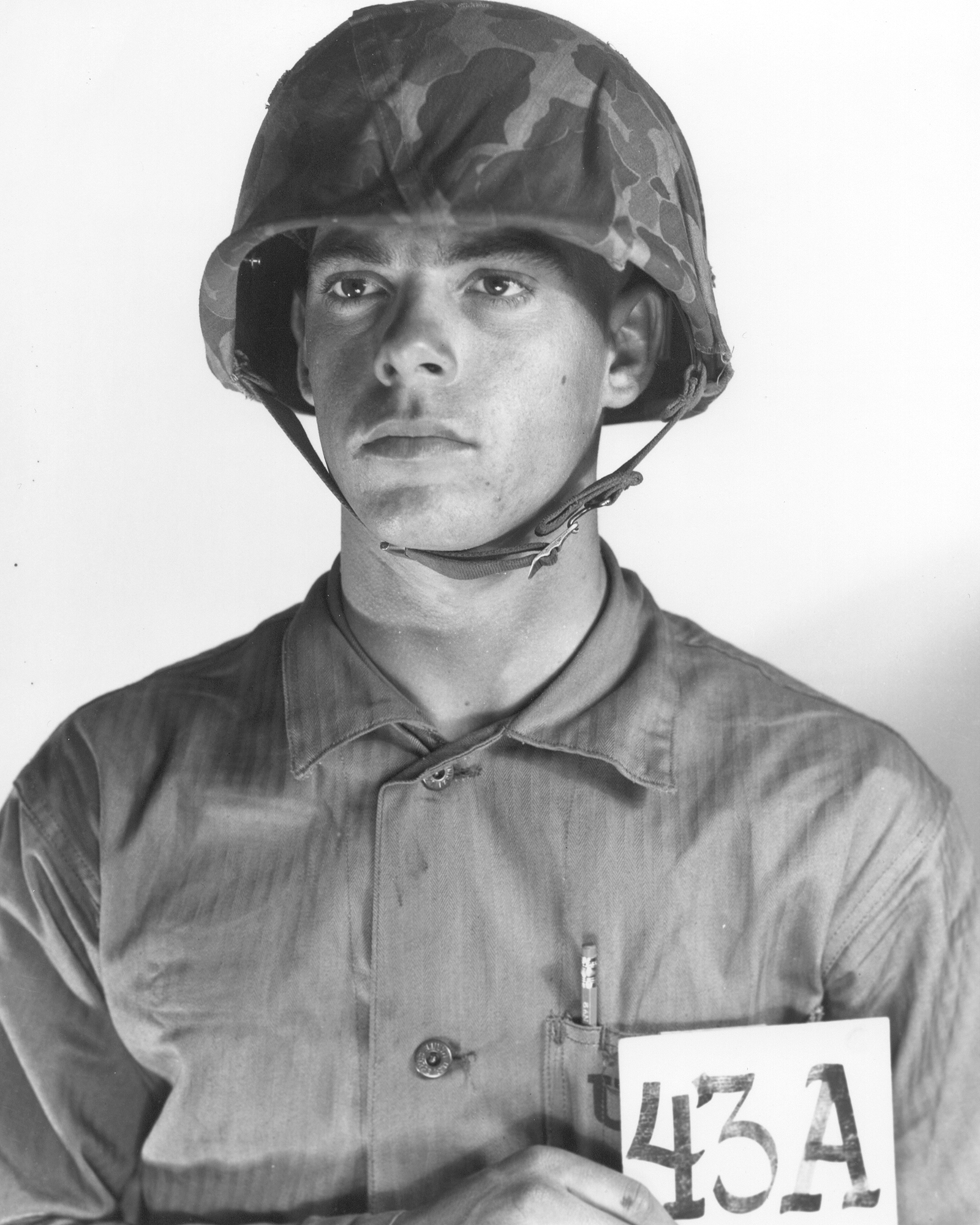
- Private Matthews as a Marine recruit in 1951
- Born: December 31, 1931; Van Nuys, California, United States
- Died: March 28, 1953 (aged 21) near Panmunjom, Korea
- Burial place: Glen Haven Cemetery; San Fernando, California
- Military career
- Allegiance: United States
- Branch: United States Marine Corps
- Service years: 1951–1953
- Rank: Sergeant
- Units: Company F, 2nd Battalion, 7th Marines, 1st Marine Division
- Conflicts: Korean War: Battle for Outpost Vegas (DOW)
- Awards: Medal of Honor; Purple Heart

Daniel Paul Matthews (December 31, 1931 – March 28, 1953) was a United States Marine Corps sergeant who was killed in action in 1953 and posthumously awarded the nation's highest military decoration, the Medal of Honor, during the Battle for Outpost Vegas for his single-handed attack under fire upon an enemy machine gun position which had prevented the evacuation of a wounded comrade.

He was the 41st Marine to receive the Medal of Honor for heroism above and beyond the call of duty during the Korean War.

== Early life ==
Daniel Paul Matthews and his twin brother were born in Van Nuys, California, on December 31, 1931. He was a member of the high school track and football teams before he left school in 1948 to work as a concrete-mixer operator for C.W. Organ, a Los Angeles contractor.

== U.S. Marine Corps ==
Matthews enlisted in the United States Marine Corps on February 21, 1951, during the Korean War, and after completing recruit training at Marine Corps Recruit Depot San Diego that April, was promoted to private first class and assigned to Camp Pendleton. While serving there with the 6th Infantry Training Battalion and the 1st Battalion 3rd Marines, 3rd Marine Division, he was promoted to corporal in March 1952 and to sergeant in July 1952.

Mathews sailed for South Korea in January 1953, joining Company F, 2nd Battalion 7th Marines, 1st Marine Division, the following month. One month later, on March 28, 1953, Matthews, a rifle platoon squad leader, was killed in action when he single-handedly attacked under fire with his rifle a Chinese three-man machine gun team position on top of a hill outpost named "Vegas" in North Korea.

== Legacy ==
After his death, Matthew's body was escorted to the United States in May 1953 by his brother, who had enlisted in the United States Navy. Matthews was buried in Glen Haven Cemetery, San Fernando, California.

The Medal of Honor was presented to his parents on March 29, 1954, by Secretary of the Navy Robert B. Anderson. The Pentagon ceremony also included presentation of posthumous Medals of Honor to the families of Marine Sergeant James E. Johnson and Marine Corporal Lee H. Phillips, who were also killed in Korea.

== Medal of Honor citation ==
The President of the United States in the name of The Congress takes pride in presenting the MEDAL OF HONOR posthumously to

SERGEANT DANIEL P. MATTHEWS
UNITED STATES MARINE CORPS

for service as set forth in the following
CITATION:

For conspicuous gallantry and intrepidity at the risk of his life above and beyond the call of duty while serving as a Squad Leader of Company F, Second Battalion, Seventh Marines, First Marine Division (Reinforced), in action against enemy aggressor forces in Korea on March 28, 1953. Participating in a counterattack against a firmly entrenched and well-concealed hostile force which had repelled six previous assaults on a vital enemy-held outpost far forward of the main line of resistance, Sergeant Matthews fearlessly advanced in the attack until his squad was pinned down by a murderous sweep of fire from an enemy machine gun located on the peak of the outpost. Observing that the deadly fire prevented a corpsman from removing a wounded man lying in an open area fully exposed to the brunt of the devastating gunfire, he worked his way to the base of the hostile machine-gun emplacement, leaped onto the rock fortification surrounding the gun and, taking the enemy by complete surprise, single-handedly charged the hostile emplacement with his rifle. Although severely wounded when the enemy brought a withering hail of fire to bear upon him, he gallantly continued his valiant one-man assault and, firing his rifle with deadly effectiveness, succeeded in killing two of the enemy, routing a third and completely silencing the enemy weapon, thereby enabling his comrades to evacuate the stricken Marine to a safe position. Succumbing to his wounds before aid could reach him, Sergeant Matthews, by his indomitable fighting spirit, courageous initiative and resolute determination in the face of almost certain death, served to inspire all who observed him and was directly instrumental in saving the life of his wounded comrade. His great personal valor reflects the highest credit upon himself and enhances the finest traditions of the United States Naval Service. He gallantly gave his life for his country.

/S/ DWIGHT D. EISENHOWER

== Awards and Decorations ==
Sergeant Matthews received the following awards for his service

1st row	Medal of Honor		
2nd row	Purple Heart	Combat Action Ribbon Retroactively Awarded, 1999	Navy Unit Commendation
3rd row	Marine Corps Good Conduct Medal	National Defense Service Medal	Korean Service Medal with 1 Campaign star
4th row	Korean Presidential Unit Citation	United Nations Service Medal Korea	Korean War Service Medal Retroactively Awarded, 2003

== See also ==
- List of Korean War Medal of Honor recipients
