= James E. Johnson =

American Medal of Honor recipient (1926–1950)

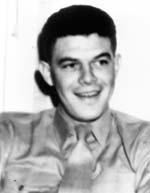
- Born: January 1, 1926; Pocatello, Idaho, United States
- Died: December 2, 1950 (aged 24); Chosin Reservoir, Korea
- Burial place: Remains not recovered; memorial headstone in Arlington National Cemetery
- Military career
- Allegiance: United States
- Branch: United States Marine Corps
- Service years: 1943–1946; 1948–1950
- Rank: Sergeant
- Units: Company J, 3rd Battalion, 7th Marines, 1st Marine Division
- Conflicts: World War II: Battle of Peleliu; Battle of Okinawa; Korean War: Battle of Inchon; Second Phase Offensive; Battle of Chosin Reservoir (MIA)
- Awards: Medal of Honor; Purple Heart

James Edmund Johnson (January 1, 1926 – December 2, 1950) was a United States Marine and a posthumous recipient of the United States' highest decoration, the Medal of Honor, for his heroic lone fight on December 2, 1950, to cover the withdrawal of his platoon during the bitter Battle of Chosin Reservoir in Korea. When last seen by his comrades Johnson was wounded, but still engaging the enemy in close grenade and hand-to-hand combat. The enemy were wearing the uniforms of friendly troops at the time. He was listed as missing in action until December 2, 1953, when his status was officially changed to killed in action.

Sergeant Johnson, a veteran of the Peleliu and Okinawa campaigns in World War II, was the seventh Marine awarded the Medal of Honor for heroism in Korea. Although Johnson was serving with a provisional company of the 7th Marines when he earned the Medal of Honor, his regular outfit was the 11th Marines, the same regiment his father had served in during World War I.

== Early life ==
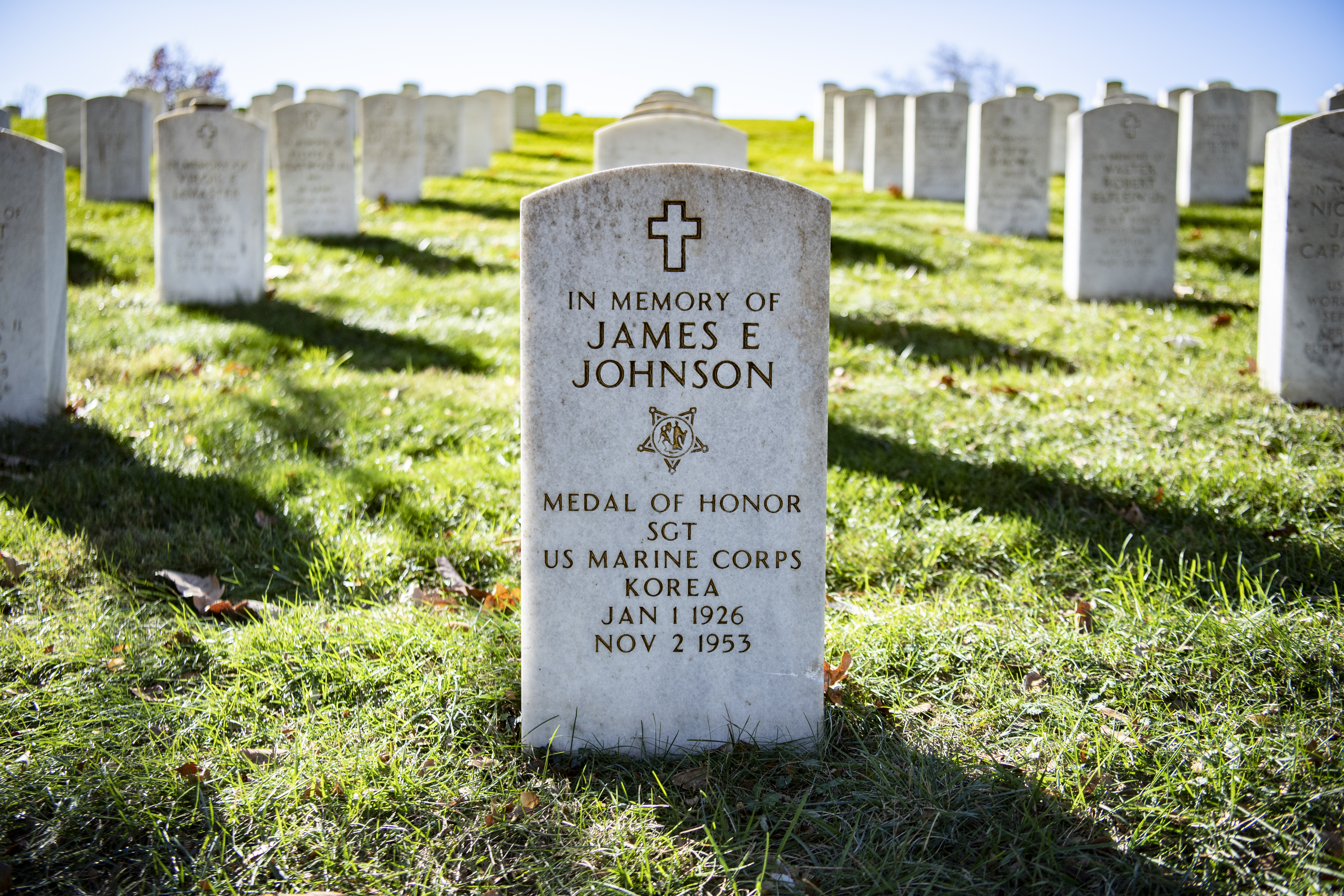
Memorial marker at Arlington National Cemetery

James Edmund Johnson was born in Pocatello, Idaho, on January 1, 1926. He attended public schools there and played junior varsity basketball for two years in high school before enlisting in the United States Marine Corps on November 10, 1943.

== Military career ==
After serving in the Pacific theater during World War II and at San Diego, Johnson was discharged on February 7, 1946, and returned to Pocatello, where he worked as a machinist in the Naval Ordnance plant. He also attended Western Washington College in Bellingham, Washington, before re-enlisting in the Marines on January 13, 1948. He embarked for Korea after a year as an instructor in post exchange accounting at the Marine Corps Institute, Marine Barracks, 8th and I Sts., S.E., Washington, D.C.

Johnson departed for Korea in August 1950, just five days after the birth of his daughter. On December 2, 1950, in Yudam-ni, Korea, Johnson fought against a disguised enemy force, allowing his unit to successfully withdraw and saving the lives of many. He was declared missing in action and as of December 2, 1953, his status was updated to killed in action. Decades after the war it was said by a fellow Marine that Johnson was last seen engaging numerous hostile enemies in hand-to-hand combat while suffering numerous gunshot wounds so they could escape. He was one of many who lost their lives in the Battle of Chosin Reservoir and whose remains were never recovered.

The Medal of Honor was presented to Johnson's widow on March 29, 1954, by Secretary of the Navy Robert B. Anderson. Medals of Honor were presented in the same Pentagon ceremony to the families of Sergeant Daniel P. Matthews and Corporal Lee H. Phillips.

Johnson is memorialized in Arlington National Cemetery, Arlington, Virginia. His cenotaph grave can be found in the Memorial Section H, Lot 451.

== Medal of Honor citation ==
The President of the United States takes pride in presenting the MEDAL OF HONOR to

SERGEANT JAMES E. JOHNSON
UNITED STATES MARINE CORPS

for service as set forth in the following CITATION:

For conspicuous gallantry and intrepidity at the risk of his life above and beyond the call of duty while serving as a Squad Leader in a Provisional Rifle Platoon composed of Artillery men and attached to Company J, Third Battalion, Seventh Marines, First Marine Division (Reinforced), in action against enemy aggressor forces at Yudam-ni, Korea, on 2 December 1950. Vastly outnumbered by a well-entrenched and cleverly concealed enemy force wearing the uniforms of friendly troops and attacking his platoon's open and unconcealed positions, Sergeant Johnson unhesitatingly took charge of his platoon in the absence of the leader and exhibiting great personal valor in the face of a heavy barrage of hostile fire, coolly proceeded to move about among his men, shouting words of encouragement and inspiration and skillfully directing their fire. Ordered to displace his platoon during the fire fight, he immediately placed himself in an extremely hazardous position from which he could provide covering fire for his men. Fully aware that his voluntary action meant either certain death or capture to himself, he courageously continued to provide effective cover for his men and was last observed in a wounded condition single-handedly engaging enemy troops in close hand grenade and hand-to-hand fighting. By his valiant and inspiring leadership, Sergeant Johnson was directly responsible for the successful completion of the platoon's displacement and the saving of many lives. His dauntless fighting spirit and unfaltering devotion to duty in the face of terrific odds reflect the highest credit upon himself and the United States Naval Service.

/S/ HARRY S. TRUMAN

== Awards and decorations ==
Johnson is also an alumnus of Sigma Tau Gamma fraternity.

1st row	Medal of Honor	Purple Heart	Combat Action Ribbon Retroactively Awarded, 1999
2nd row	Purple Heart	Navy Commendation Medal	Combat Action Ribbon With 5/16 inch star
3rd row	Navy Presidential Unit Citation with 2 Service stars	Navy Unit Commendation	Marine Corps Good Conduct Medal
4th row	American Campaign Medal	Asiatic-Pacific Campaign Medal with 2 Campaign stars	World War II Victory Medal
2nd row	Navy Occupation Service Medal with 'Asia' clasp	National Defense Service Medal	Korean Service Medal with 3 Campaign stars
3rd row	Korean Presidential Unit Citation	United Nations Service Medal Korea	Korean War Service Medal Retroactively Awarded, 2003

== See also ==
- List of Korean War Medal of Honor recipients
- List of people who disappeared
- William G. Windrich, USMC Medal of Honor recipient, also killed in action at Yudam-ni.
