= 2nd Battalion, 7th Marines =

US Marine Corps unit

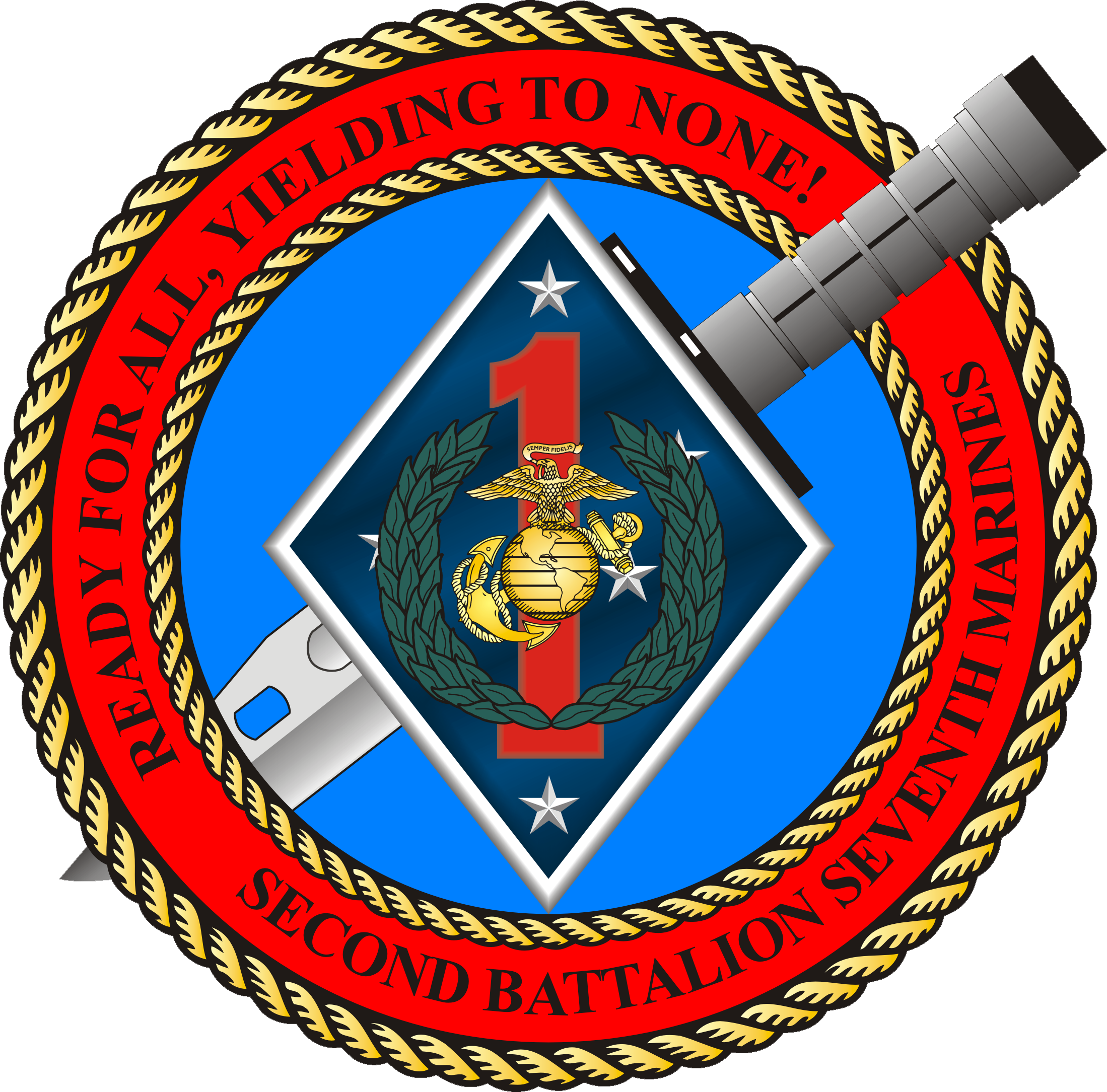
- 2nd Battalion, 7th Marines' insignia
- Active: 1 January 1940 – 26 February 1947; 17 August 1950 – present
- Country: United States
- Branch: United States Marine Corps
- Type: Light infantry
- Size: 800
- Part of: 7th Marine Regiment; 1st Marine Division
- Garrison/HQ: Marine Corps Air Ground Combat Center Twentynine Palms
- Nicknames: "War Dogs" and "Havoc"
- Mottos: "Ready for all, yielding to none!"
- Anniversaries: 1 January 1940
- Engagements: World War II; Guadalcanal campaign; Battle of Cape Gloucester; Battle of Peleliu; Battle of Okinawa; Korean War; Battle of Inchon; Second Battle of Seoul; Battle of Chosin Reservoir; Battle of Hwacheon; Battle of the Punchbowl; Battle of Bunker Hill (1952); First Battle of the Hook; Battle for Outpost Vegas; Battle of the Samichon River; Vietnam War; Persian Gulf War; Operation Desert Storm; Nicaraguan Revolution; Operation Golden Pheasant; Global War on Terrorism; Iraq War; Operation Iraqi Freedom; War in Afghanistan; June 2025 Los Angeles protests

Commanders
- Notable commanders: Herman H. Hanneken; James D. Hittle; Odell M. Conoley; Paul K. Van Riper

The 2nd Battalion, 7th Marines (2/7) is a light infantry battalion of the United States Marine Corps. They are based at the Marine Corps Air Ground Combat Center Twentynine Palms and consist of approximately 800 marines and sailors. The battalion falls under the command of the 7th Marine Regiment and the 1st Marine Division.

== Subordinate units ==
The battalion's current subordinate units are:

- Headquarters & Service Company
- Easy Company
- Fox Company
- Gunfighters Company
- Weapons Company

At the beginning of World War II, the battalion had three subordinate rifle companies – E (Easy), F (Fox), G (Gunfighters), a weapons company designated as H (How), and a Headquarters Company. As the war progressed, the weapons company was eliminated and the component elements redistributed throughout the headquarters and rifle companies. During the Korean War, the battalion's three rifle companies were designated D (Dog), E (Easy) and F (Fox). During the Vietnam War, the battalion was organized under a four rifle company order of battle – E (Echo), F (Fox), G (Golf) and H (Hotel). As of 2022, 2nd Battalion, 7th Marines utilizes the company callsigns of E (Easy), F (Fox), G (Gunfighters), and Weapons (Wildcard) for their subordinate companies.

== History ==
=== World War II ===
==== Guadalcanal ====
The battalion was activated on 1 January 1941 at Guantanamo Bay, Cuba. On 18 September 1942, 2/7 landed on Guadalcanal. They fought the Battle of Guadalcanal for four months until they were relieved by elements of the United States Army's Americal Division. The battalion was then sent to Australia along with the rest of the 1st Marine Division for rest and refit.

==== Operation Cartwheel ====
2/7 landed on Cape Gloucester, New Britain on 26 December 1943 under the command of Lieutenant colonel Odell M. Conoley securing an airfield the first day. That night, Japanese Marines counterattacked and 2/7 took the brunt of the assault and the fighting continued throughout the night. By the time the sun began to rise, the entire Japanese force had been wiped out. On 14 January, 2/7 along with the rest of the regiment assaulted and took the last Japanese stronghold on the island, Hill 660. Two days later, the counter-attack came but the Marines held the hilltop often resorting to hand-to-hand fighting.

The battalion continued to run patrols around the island to protect against guerrilla attacks from hold-out Japanese soldiers. In March 1944, New Britain was declared secure and on 1 April 1 Marine Division was relieved by the US Army 40th Infantry Division. 2/7, and the rest of the 1st Marine Division again returned to Australia.

==== Battle of Peleliu ====
On 15 September 1944 , the 7th Marines (minus the 2nd battalion) landed along with the rest of the 1st Marine Division. Note: The 2nd battalion was the only battalion to be held in reserve. They were to go in later in the day in support of the 7th Marines. However, Chesty Puller's 1st Marines were having the worst time as they were on the left flank and adjacent to where the mountainous area on Peleliu called the Umurbrogal Pocket began – where all the Japanese holed up. On the night of 20 September the 2nd battalion went out to the transfer line, but there were not enough LVT's. Instead, they had to wait and go in the next morning directly in support of Chesty Puller's 1st Marines. The 2nd battalion went right into the middle of the fighting of the 1st marine regiment. When they landed they were met by intense artillery and mortar fire from Japanese positions that had not been touched by the pre-invasion bombardment. On 20 September, the 7th Marines broke out of their beachhead and linked up with the 1st Marines. The battalion fought on the island for another eight weeks before it was secured.

==== Battle of Okinawa ====
On 1 April 1945, was part of the 80,000 marines that landed on Okinawa. The 1st Marine Division landed on the southern portion of Okinawa against light resistance. Their beachhead was quickly secured and supplies began flowing in. Resistance began to become stronger as the marines pushed north. The 1st Marine Division was ordered into Reserve to protect the right flank of the invasion forces. The battalion fought the Japanese along the coast and was stopped suddenly at the Shuri Castle. For 30 days, along with the rest of the Division and the Army 77th Infantry Division, battled the Japanese stronghold.

After Okinawa, 2/7 was part of the Operation Beleaguer in China where they went to repatriate the Japanese forces there. In addition they were called upon to keep the peace during the bloody civil war between the Chinese Nationalists and Communist forces. In 1947, 2/7 returned to California and were deactivated later that year.

=== Korean War ===
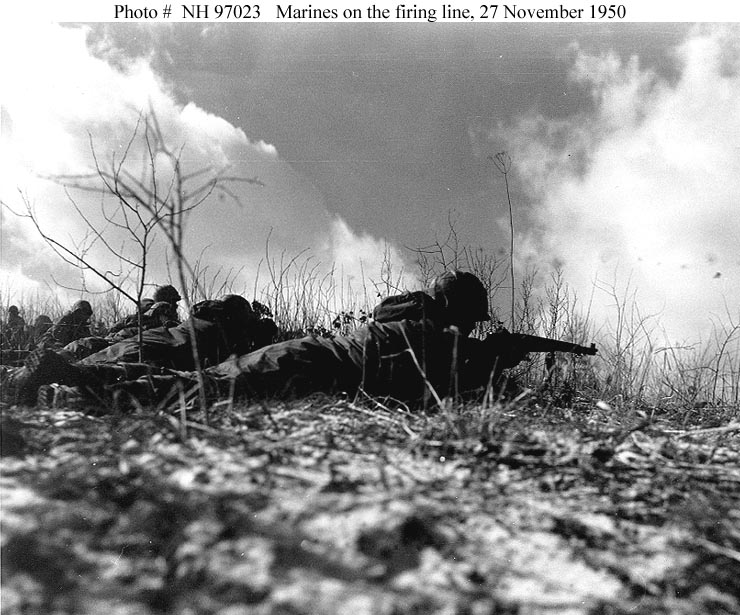
Weapons Company, in line with Headquarters and Service Company, 2d Battalion, 7th Marines, trying to contact the temporarily cut off Company F in a glancing engagement to permit the 5th and 7th Marines to withdraw from the Yudam-ni area 27 November 1950.

The Battalion participated in the Inchon Landing and the recapture of Seoul. The 1st Marine Division, was then put back on ship and sailed around to the east coast of Korea. They eventually landed at Wonsan in late October and from there participated in the Battle of Chosin Reservoir.

During the battle Captain William Barber earned the Medal of Honor for his actions as commander of Fox 2/7. F/2/7 held a position known as "Fox Hill" against vastly superior numbers of Chinese infantry, holding the Toktong Pass open and keeping the 5th Marine Regiment and the 7th Marine Regiment from getting cut off at Yudam-ni. His company's actions to keep the pass open, allowed these two regiments to perform their withdrawal from Yudam-ni and consolidate with the rest of the 1st Marine Division at Hagaru-ri.

The mission to relieve F/2/7 on top of Fox Hill also led to LtCol Raymond Davis, then commanding officer of 1st Battalion 7th Marines, receiving the Medal of Honor. After the withdrawal from Chosin the 1st Marine Division was evacuated from Hungnam. The battalion took part in fighting on the East Central Front and Western Front of the Jamestown Line for the remainder of the war.

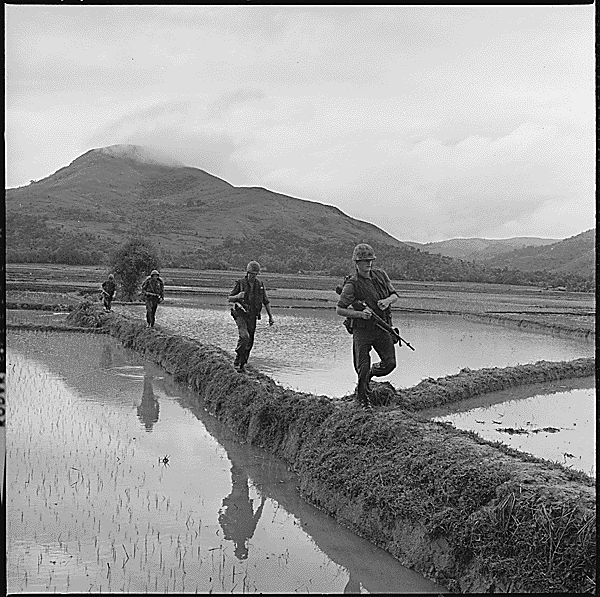
Men of Company H, 2d Battalion, 7th Marines, move along rice paddy dikes in pursuit of the Viet Cong, 12/10/1965 (Operation Harvest Moon)

Hospital Corpsman 3rd Class William R. Charette, USN was assigned as a medical corpsman with Company F, 2nd Battalion, 7th Marines on 27 March 1953, when his heroic actions earned him the Medal of Honor.

=== Vietnam War ===
2/7 was deployed to Vietnam from July 1965 until October 1970 as part of the 7th Marine Regiment, 1st Marine Division. The battalion operated in the southern half of I Corp most of the time. Qui Nhon, Chu Lai, Da Nang Air Base, Dai Loc and An Hoa. 2/7 were instrumental players in Operation Utah and Operation Harvest Moon.

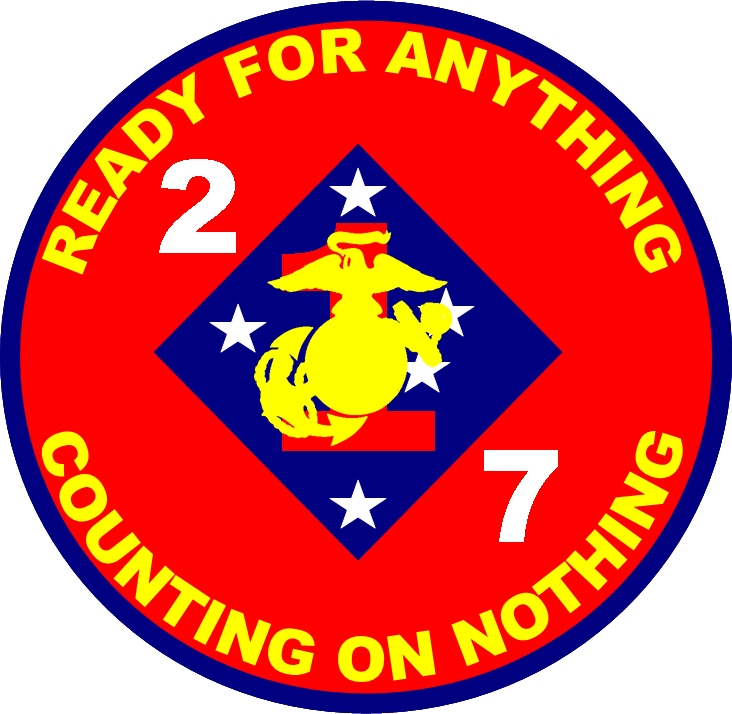
2/7's Vietnam Era battalion logo

=== The Gulf War and the 1990s ===
2/7 relocated during January 1990 to Marine Corps Air Ground Combat Center Twentynine Palms, California, and participated in Operations Desert Shield and Desert Storm in Saudi Arabia and Kuwait from August 1990 through March 1991 when they redeployed back to the United States. For the rest of the 1990s the battalion took part in the regular Unit Deployment Program (UDP) rotation to Okinawa. In this scheme, 7th Marine Regiment sequentially rotated one of its battalions to Camp Schwab for six months to serve as one of the three battalions attached to the 4th Marine Regiment. The battalion conducted jungle warfare training in Okinawa's Northern Training Area (NTA) and cold weather warfare training in mainland Japan by rotating to Marine Base Camp Fuji, at the base of Mt. Fuji. In October 1994, 2nd Battalion 7th Marines boarded the USS Belleau Wood (LHA-3) and USS San Bernardino (LST-1189) to sail from Okinawa to the Philippines to take part in the 50th Anniversary reenactment of the landings at Leyte Gulf.

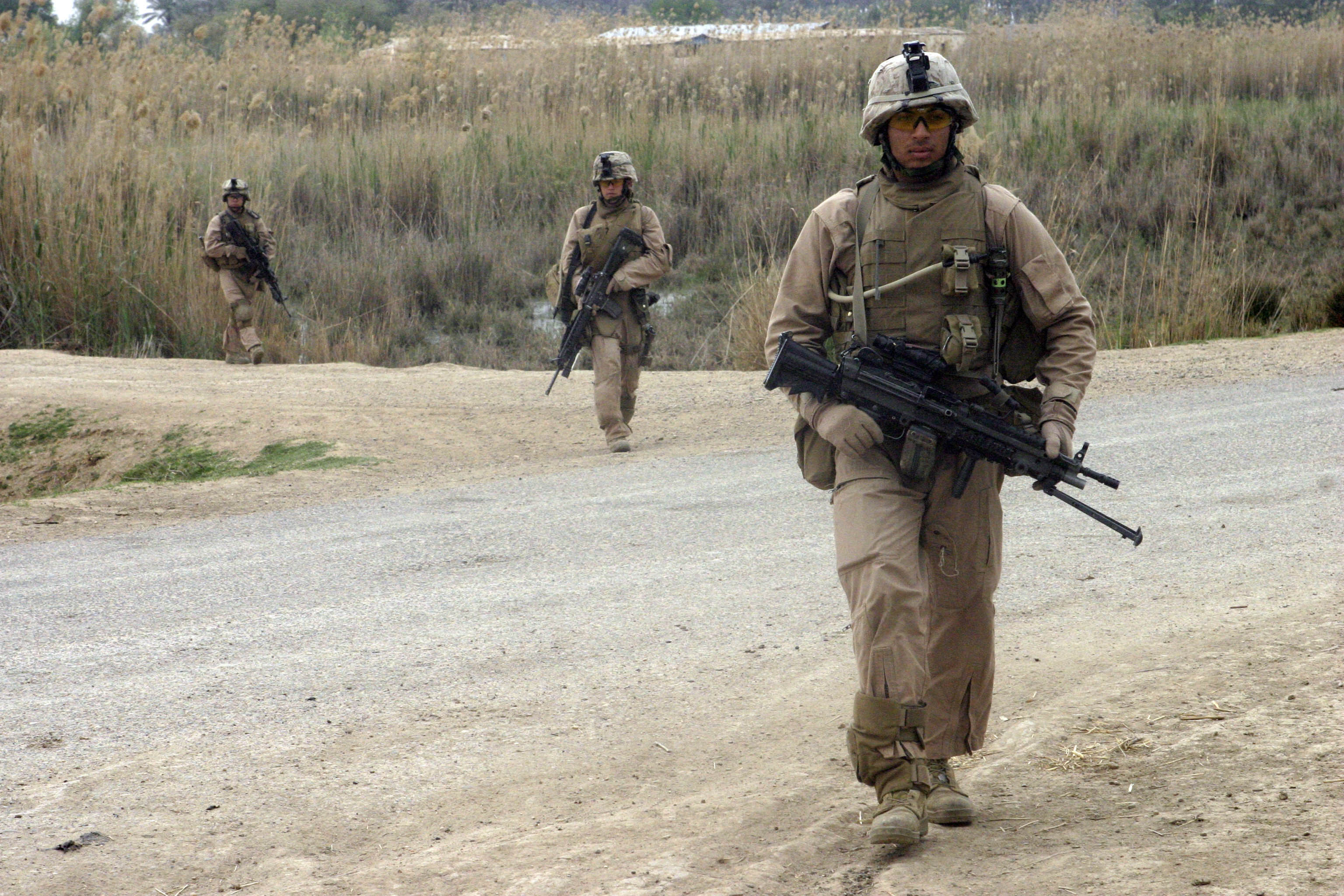
Marines from Company F, 2nd Battalion, 7th Marines patrol in Zaidon, Iraq.

=== Iraq War (2003–2007) ===
During the 2003 invasion of Iraq, 2/7 was stop-moved in Okinawa until the Summer of 2003, during this period they were known as the 2/7 War Dodgers Cry Havoc and let slip the Regiment. The battalion deployed in February 2004 in support of Operation Iraqi Freedom (OIF). They were among the first marines redeployed to the country after the initial invasion, and lost eight marines during that deployment. The battalion deployed in support of OIF for the second time from July 2005 to January 2006. They operated in the Al-Anbar Province and suffered 13 marines killed in action. The battalion was again deployed to Al-Anbar from January to August 2007. During this third Iraq deployment, 2/7 suffered 8 marines killed in action. Marines from the battalion took part in Operation Vigilant Resolve and Operation Alljah.

=== War in Afghanistan (2008, 2012–2013) ===
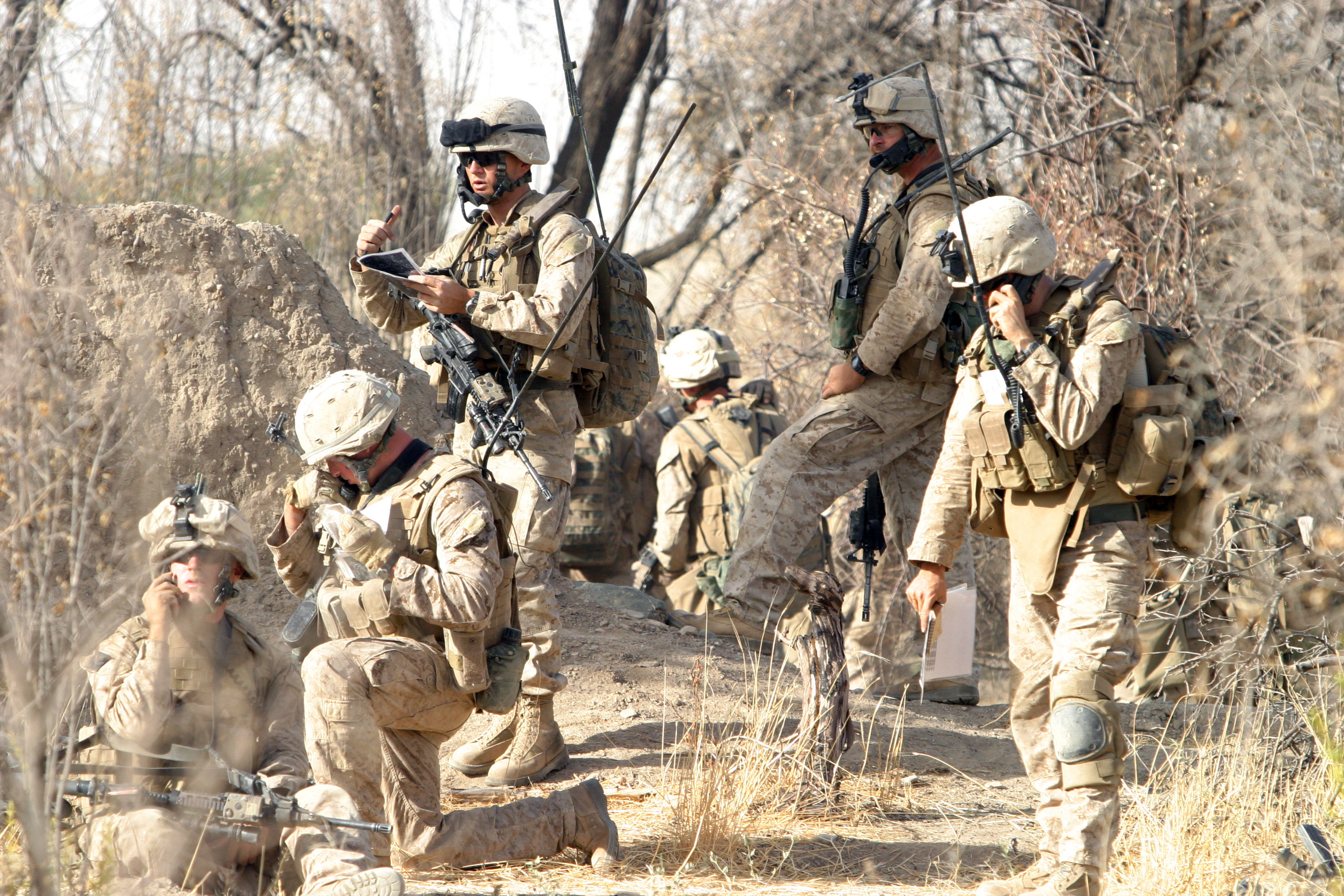
Marines from Company F, 2nd Battalion, 7th Marines conduct combat operations against the enemy in Now Zad, Helmand.

2/7 deployed to Helmand and Farah Provinces, Afghanistan from April to December 2008. The battalion spearheaded the return of Marines to Afghanistan, and was engaged in heavy combat with insurgent elements throughout their deployment. 2/7 operated from Camp Bastion and bases in Sangin, Gereshk, Musa Qaleh, Now Zad, Delaram, Gulistan, Bakwa and Bala Baluk. Called "the hardest hit battalion in the Corps this year ," in 2008, the battalion suffered 20 men killed and 160 wounded, thirty of which were amputees. Four marines assigned or attached to the battalion were awarded the Navy Cross for their actions during the 2008 deployment. The battalion deployed to Afghanistan again in the autumn of 2012 into early 2013.

=== Okinawa, Unit Deployment Program, and the 31st MEU, 2009-2011 ===
Following its Afghanistan deployment, 2/7 deployed to Okinawa, Japan in January 2010, for the first time since 2002. The Battalion was the ground combat element for the 31st Marine Expeditionary Unit from December 2009 – June 2010, and then again from June–December 2011.

=== Special Purpose Marine Air-Ground Task Force, Central-Command ===
As of June 2019, the battalion has deployed with the SP-MAGTF as the Ground Combat Element three separate times since late-2014. As the GCE, the unit has deployed to Iraq, Yemen, Jordan, Syria, Afghanistan, & Kuwait. Missions have included training with foreign partners, providing base security, isolated-personnel recovery, & crisis response.

On 7-8 February 2018, elements of Combined Anti-Armor Team (CAAT) 2 were attached to US Special Operations forces at the Conoco Gas plant near Khasham, Dier ez-Zor, Syria, where they were attacked by 500 pro-regime militia and Russian Wagner mercenaries. Additional elements of Weapons Company responded as a quick reactionary force (QRF) from nearby Firebase Ash-Shaddadi. The QRF team was stopped short of their objective due to the intensity of the fighting near the gas plant.

In October 2019, elements of V27 assisted in the US draw down in Northeastern Syria which caused intense standoffs with local Kurdish forces and nearby Russian Armed Forces units. During this same deployment, Easy Company and its attachments would deploy 100 marines and corpsmen in response to the attack on the US Embassy in Baghdad, Iraq.

=== 2025 Los Angeles Protests ===
On 9 June 2025, approximately 700 Marines from the 2nd Battalion, 7th Marines (2/7) were activated under Title 10 orders to deploy from Marine Corps Air–Ground Combat Center Twentynine Palms to Los Angeles, augmenting roughly 2,100 federalized California National Guard personnel guarding federal facilities during widespread protests against federal immigration raids; the move marked the first deployment of active-duty Marines to handle civil unrest in the city since the 1992 riots. Because President Donald Trump did not invoke the Insurrection Act and the state did not request assistance, legal scholars and civil-rights groups contend the deployment violates the Posse Comitatus Act, which bars active-duty forces from enforcing civilian law without explicit congressional authorization. However, since the Marines are solely being deployed to guard federal facilities and not enforcing the law, many legal scholars opine that it does not violate the Act.

== Unit awards ==
A unit citation or commendation is an award bestowed upon an organization for the action cited. Members of the unit who participated in said actions are allowed to wear on their uniforms the appropriate ribbon of the awarded unit citation. 2nd Battalion, 7th Marines have been awarded the following:

Streamer	Award	Year(s)	Additional Info
	Presidential Unit Citation Streamer with one Silver and four Bronze Stars	1942, 1944, 1945, 1950, 1950, 1951, 1965–1966, 1966–1967, 1967–1968, 1968	Solomon Islands, Peleliu – Ngesebus, Okinawa, Korea (Inchon Landing, Chosin Reservoir, Punchbowl), Vietnam War
	Navy Unit Commendation Streamer with one Silver and two Bronze Stars	1952–1953, 1965, 1968, 1990–1991, 2002–2003, 2005–2006, 2007, 2008	Korea, Vietnam, Southwest Asia, Western Pacific, Iraq, Afghanistan
	Meritorious Unit Commendation Streamer with two Bronze Stars	1968, 1968, 2014-2015	Vietnam War
	American Defense Service Streamer with one Bronze Star	1941	Cuba
	Asiatic-Pacific Campaign Streamer with one Silver Star	1943, 1944, 1945	Guadalcanal, Eastern New Guinea, New Britain, Peleliu, Okinawa
	World War II Victory Streamer	1942–1945	Pacific War
	Navy Occupation Service Streamer with "ASIA"	2–26 September 1945	Okinawa
	China Service Streamer	30 September 1945 – 5 January 1947	North China
	National Defense Service Streamer with three Bronze Stars	1950–1954, 1961–1974, 1990–1995, 2001–present	Korean War, Vietnam War, Gulf War, war on terrorism
	Korean Service Streamer with one Silver and four Bronze Stars	September 1950 – March 1955	Inchon-Seoul, Chosin Reservoir, East Central Front, Western Front, Defense of the Demilitarized Zone
	Vietnam Service Streamer with two Silver and three Bronze Stars	July 1965 – October 1970	Qui Nhon, Chu Lai, Da Nang, Dai Loc, An Hoa
	Southwest Asia Service Streamer with two Bronze Stars	1990–1991	Desert Shield, Desert Storm
	Afghanistan Campaign Streamer with two Bronze Stars	2008, 2012	Helmand and Farah Provinces (Consolidation II, Transition I)
	Iraq Campaign Streamer with three Bronze Stars	July 2005 – January 2006, February – August 2007	Al Anbar Province (Iraqi Governance, National Resolution, Iraqi Surge)
	Global War on Terrorism Expeditionary Streamer	March – October 2004	Al Anbar Province (Transition of Iraq)
	Global War on Terrorism Service Streamer	2001–present	
	Korea Presidential Unit Citation Streamer	21–27 September 1950, 26 October 1950 – 27 July 1953	Korea
	Vietnam Gallantry Cross with Palm Streamer	7 July 1965 – 20 September 1969	Vietnam
	Vietnam Meritorious Unit Citation Civil Actions Streamer	21 September 1969 – 12 October 1970	Vietnam

== Medal of Honor ==
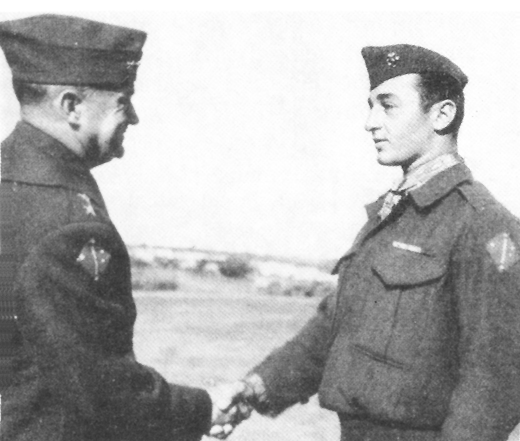
Sgt Mitchell Paige receives the Medal of Honor from General Vandegrift for outstanding heroism while manning a machine-gun of the 2d Battalion, 7th Marines during the late October 1942 battles for Henderson Field on Guadalcanal

Ten marines and two sailors have been awarded the Medal of Honor while serving with 2d Battalion, 7th Marines.

Battle of Guadalcanal

- Sgt Mitchell Paige – 26 October 1942

Battle of Peleliu

- PFC Charles H. Roan – 18 September 1944 (posthumously)
- PFC John D. New – 25 September 1944 (posthumously)

Korean War

- Cpl Lee H. Phillips – 4 November 1950 (posthumously)
- SSgt Robert S. Kennemore – 27–28 November 1950
- PFC Hector A. Cafferata Jr. – 28 November 1950
- Capt William E. Barber – 28 November-2 December 1950
- Sgt Daniel P. Matthews – 28 March 1953 (posthumously)
- Hospitalman Richard De Wert USN – 5 April 1951 (posthumously)
- Hospital Corpsman 3rd Class William R. Charette, USN – 27 March 1953
- SSgt Ambrosio Guillen – 25 July 1953 (posthumously)

Vietnam War

- PFC Oscar P. Austin – 23 February 1969 (posthumously)

== Other notable former personnel ==
- Henry H. Black – 2nd Battalion 7th Marines sergeant major, who also served as the 7th Sergeant Major of the Marine Corps from 1975 to 1977.
- James Brady – served with 2/7 during the Korean War, including platoon commander and executive officer with D Company and battalion intelligence officer.
- Ronald D. Castille – served with 2/7 during the Vietnam War.
- John Chafee – served with 2/7 during the Korean War as a captain. 60th Secretary of the Navy from 1969-1972.
- Herman H. Hanneken, Medal of Honor, Battalion Commander on Guadalcanal.
- Angel Mendez – Navy Cross, Vietnam War.
- Anthony Swofford – served with 2/7 during the Gulf War.
- Roy Tackett – served with 2/7 during World War II.
- John A. Toolan – Golf Company, 2/7 company commander 1982–1984
- Paul K. Van Riper, Battalion Commander 1983–1985
- John H. Yancey – served with E Company in the Battle of Chosin Reservoir, earning a Navy Cross and Silver Star.
- Micheal Barrett - 2nd Battalion 7th Marines sergeant major, who also served as the 17th Sergeant Major of the Marine Corps from 2011 to 2015
- Brent L. Morel - Navy Cross Recipient with 1st Recon BN, Gulf Gunfighter.
- David Wimberg - Navy Cross Recipient with 3/25, former 'E' Co Marine.

== In popular culture ==
- One of the subplots in Season 1 Episode 10 of the television series The West Wing, In Excelsis Deo, centers around Toby Ziegler getting involved in the fate of a dead homeless person who Zeigler identifies to the police as a former marine and Korean War veteran by a 2/7 tattoo on the dead man's arm.
- 2/7 is highlighted in a 2008 deployment to Afghanistan in the book '15 Years of War' where the Marines fought one of the most arduous battles the Marine Corps has seen in Now Zad, Afghanistan.
- A documentary titled The Forgotten Battalion about 2/7 and their unique suicide problem was released in 2020.

== See also ==
- Al Anbar campaign
- List of United States Marine Corps battalions
- Organization of the United States Marine Corps
