= Lee H. Phillips =

United States Marine Corps Medal of Honor recipient

Lee Hugh Phillips
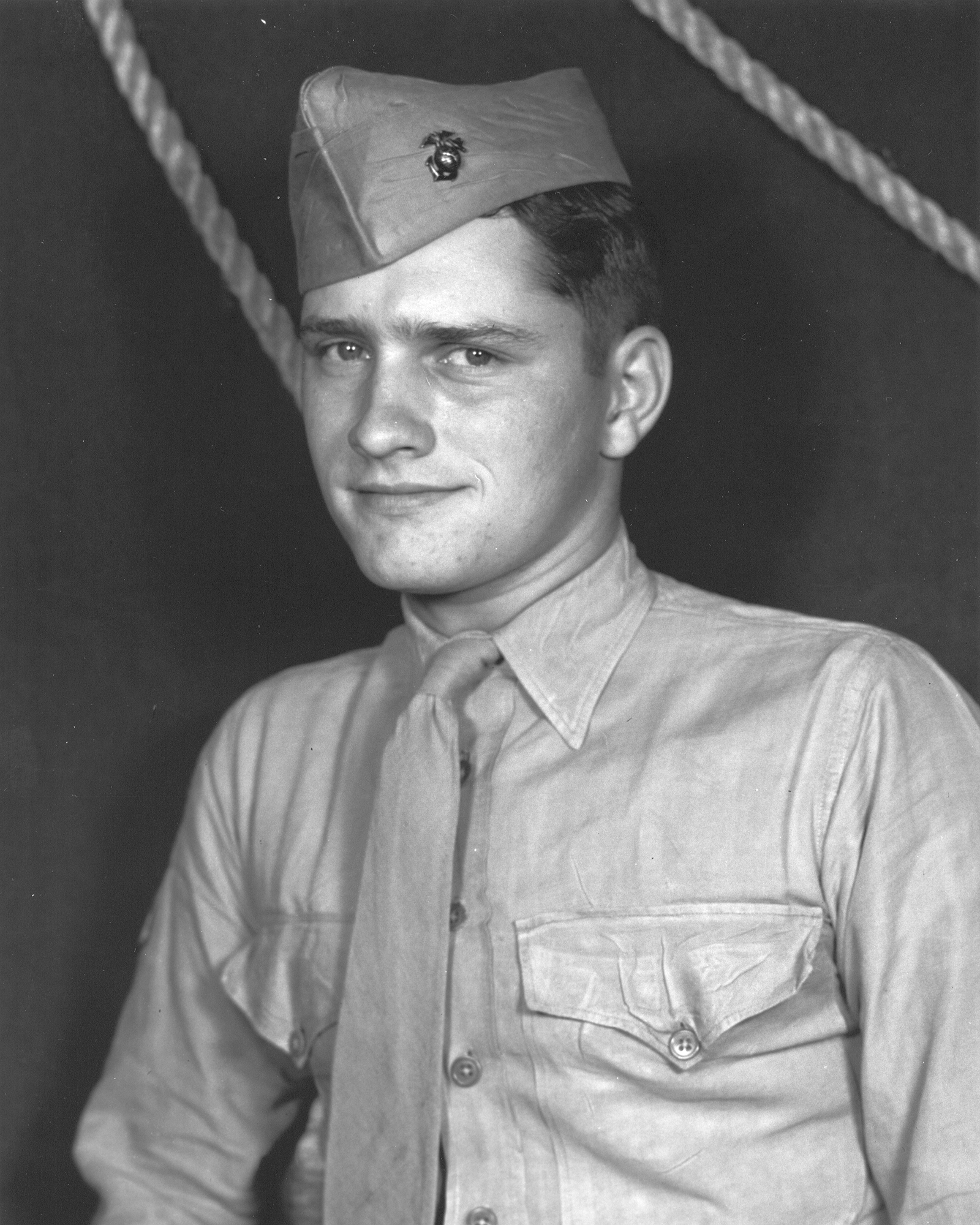
- Lee H. Phillips
- Born: February 3, 1930; Stockbridge, Georgia, US
- Died: November 27, 1950 (aged 20); Chosin Reservoir, Changjin County, North Korea
- Burial place: Marietta National Cemetery, Marietta, Georgia
- Military career
- Allegiance: United States
- Branch: United States Marine Corps
- Service years: 1948–1950
- Rank: Corporal
- Units: Company E, 2nd Battalion 7th Marines, 1st Marine Division
- Conflicts: Korean War: Second Battle of Seoul; Battle of Chosin Reservoir †
- Awards: Medal of Honor; Purple Heart

Lee Hugh Phillips (February 3, 1930 – November 27, 1950) was a United States Marine who was posthumously awarded the United States' highest military decoration – the Medal of Honor – for his heroism on November 4, 1950, while fighting in Korea with Company E, 2nd Battalion, 7th Marines, 1st Marine Division, in the push toward the Chosin Reservoir. The 20-year-old squad leader was the 40th Marine to be awarded the Medal of Honor for actions during the Korean War.

Although he survived that action, he was killed at Yudam-ni on November 27, 1950, during a later phase of the hard-fought Chosin Reservoir campaign. The medal was presented to his mother on March 29, 1954, by Secretary of the Navy Robert B. Anderson. The Pentagon ceremony also included presentation of posthumous Medals of Honor to the families of Sergeants James E. Johnson and Daniel P. Matthews.

== Biography ==
Lee Hugh Phillips was born on February 3, 1930, in Stockbridge, Georgia. He attended school in Ellenwood, Georgia, until 1945, then worked six months painting picture frames for the Georgia Art Supply Company of Atlanta, and more than a year as a stock clerk at the Davison-Paxton department store in that city. He enlisted in the Marine Corps Reserve on January 17, 1948, and after six months of inactive duty, joined the regular Marine Corps on July 19, 1948.

Completing his recruit training at Parris Island, South Carolina in October 1948, he was promoted to private first class and assigned to the 8th Marines, 2nd Marine Division, at Camp Lejeune, North Carolina. He remained with the 8th Marines for a year, serving with the regiment on Caribbean maneuvers in February and March 1949, and in the Mediterranean from May to September 1949. He then served with Company E, 2nd Battalion, 6th Marines until August 1950, when the battalion was assigned to the 7th Marines, 1st Marine Division for service in Korea. He sailed from San Diego, California, with that unit in September 1950, and had fought with Company E in the capture of Seoul before he was killed in action.

A cenotaph the Marietta National Cemetery in Marietta, Georgia was erected in his honor.

== Medal of Honor citation ==
The President of the United States takes pride in presenting the MEDAL OF HONOR posthumously to

CORPORAL LEE H. PHILLIPS
UNITED STATES MARINE CORPS

for service as set forth in the following CITATION:

For conspicuous gallantry and intrepidity at the risk of his life above and beyond the call of duty while serving as a Squad Leader of Company E, Second Battalion, Seventh Marines, First Marine Division(Reinforced), in action against enemy aggressor forces in Korea on 4 November 1950. Assuming the point position in the attack against a strongly defended and well-entrenched numerically superior enemy force occupying a vital hill position which had been unsuccessfully assaulted on five separate occasions by units of the Marine Corps and other friendly forces, Corporal Phillips fearlessly led his men in a bayonet charge up the precipitous slope under a deadly hail of hostile mortar, small-arms and machine-gun fire. Quickly rallying his squad when it was pinned down by a heavy and accurate mortar barrage, he continued to lead his men through the bombarded area and, although only five members were left in the casualty ridden unit, gained the military crest of the hill where he was immediately subjected to an enemy counterattack. Although greatly outnumbered by an estimated enemy squad, Corporal Phillips boldly engaged the hostile force with hand grenades and rifle fire and, exhorting his gallant group of Marines to follow him, stormed forward to completely overwhelm the enemy. With only three men now left in his squad, he proceeded to spearhead an assault on the last remaining strong point which was defended by four of the enemy on a rocky and almost inaccessible portion of the hill position. Using one hand to climb up the extremely hazardous precipice, he hurled grenades with the other and, with two remaining comrades, succeeded in annihilating the pocket of resistance and in consolidating the position. Immediately subjected to a sharp counterattack by an estimated enemy squad, he skillfully directed the fire of his men and employed his own weapon with deadly effectiveness to repulse the numerically superior hostile force. By his valiant leadership, indomitable fighting spirit and resolute determination in the face of heavy odds, Corporal Phillips served to inspire all who observed him and was directly responsible for the destruction of the enemy stronghold. His great personal valor reflects the highest credit upon himself and enhances and sustains the finest traditions of the United States Naval Service.

/S/ DWIGHT D. EISENHOWER

== Awards and decorations ==

1st row	Medal of Honor		
2nd row	Purple Heart	Combat Action Ribbon Retroactively Awarded, 1999	Navy Presidential Unit Citation with 1 Service star
3rd row	Navy Occupation Service Medal with 'Europe' clasp	National Defense Service Medal	Korean Service Medal with 2 Campaign stars
4th row	Korean Presidential Unit Citation	United Nations Service Medal Korea	Korean War Service Medal Retroactively Awarded, 2003

== See also ==
- List of Korean War Medal of Honor recipients
