= Oscar P. Austin =

United States Marine Corps Medal of Honor recipient (1948–1969)

Oscar Palmer Austin
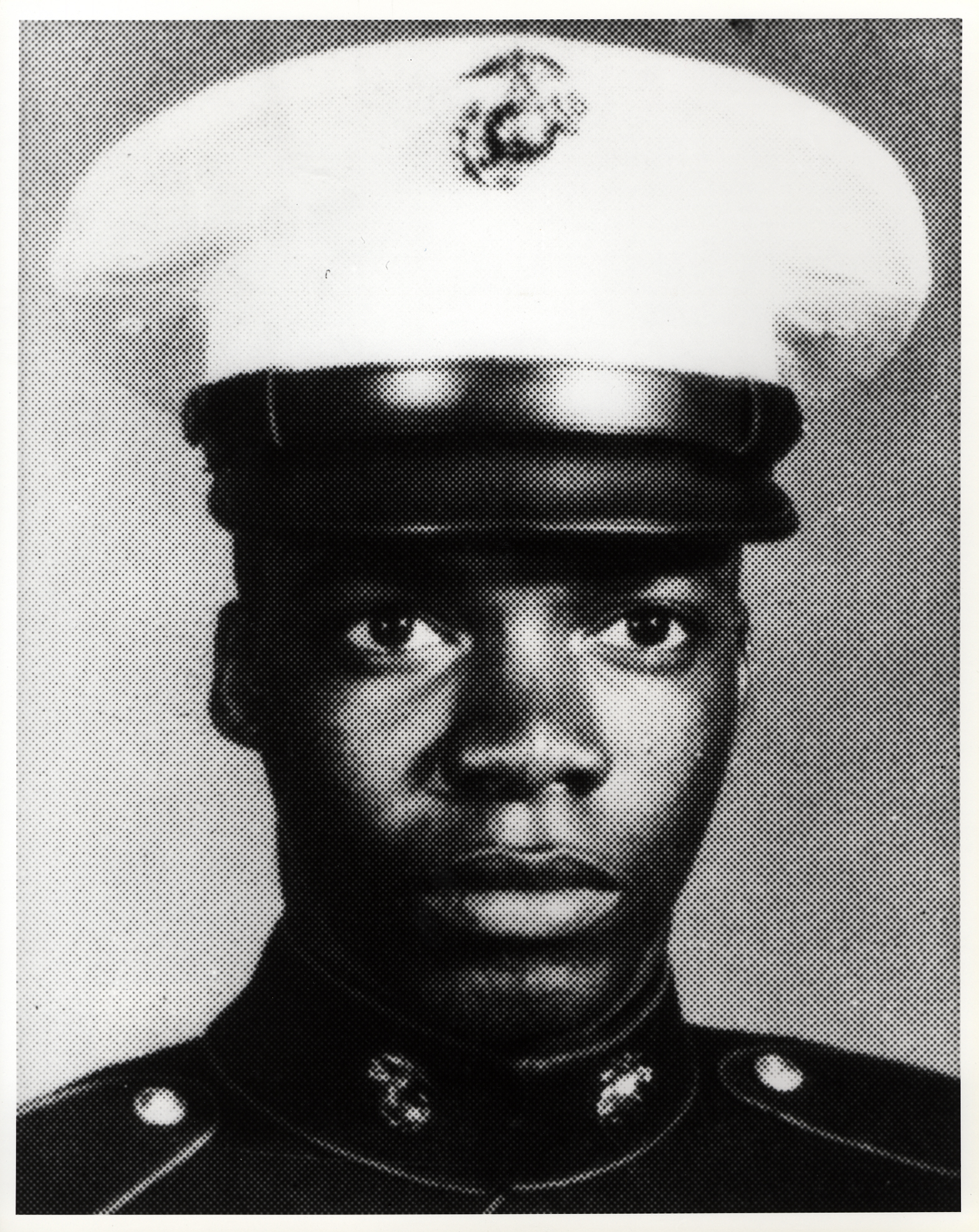
- Oscar P. Austin, Medal of Honor recipient
- Born: January 15, 1948; Nacogdoches, Texas, U.S.
- Died: February 23, 1969 (aged 21); Da Nang Province, Republic of Vietnam
- Burial place: Greenwood/Memory Lawn Mortuary & Cemetery, Phoenix, Arizona
- Military career
- Allegiance: United States
- Branch: United States Marine Corps
- Service years: 1968–1969
- Rank: Private First Class
- Units: Company E, 2nd Battalion, 7th Marines, 1st Marine Division
- Conflicts: Vietnam War (DOW)
- Awards: Medal of Honor; Purple Heart

Oscar Palmer Austin (January 15, 1948 – February 23, 1969) was a United States Marine who posthumously received his nation's highest military honor — the Medal of Honor — for heroism and sacrifice of his own life in Vietnam in February 1969.

On February 12, 1969, Austin's observation post near Da Nang was attacked by a large North Vietnamese force. His fellow Marine was wounded, and Austin went over to help him. Austin jumped onto an enemy grenade landing near the wounded man and suffered severe injuries, and then protected his fellow Marine by jumping between him and a shooting Vietnamese soldier. Austin was mortally wounded during this action and was posthumously awarded the Medal of Honor in 1970.

== Early life and education ==
Austin was born on January 15, 1948, in Nacogdoches, Texas. He attended Booker T. Washington Elementary School in Phoenix, Arizona, and Phoenix Union High School.

== Career ==
Austin joined the United States Marine Corps in Phoenix, Arizona April 22, 1968, and completed recruit training with the 3rd Recruit Training Battalion at Marine Corps Recruit Depot San Diego, California, in July 1968. He completed his individual combat training with Company T, 3rd Battalion, 2nd Infantry Training Regiment, Marine Corps Base Camp Pendleton, California, in August 1968; and basic infantry training with Weapons Company, Basic Infantry Training Battalion, 2nd Infantry Training Regiment at Camp Pendleton, in September.

Promoted to private first class on October 1, 1968, Austin was transferred later that month to South Vietnam, where he served as ammunitions man with Company E, 2nd Battalion, 7th Marines, 1st Marine Division.

During the early morning hours on February 23, 1969, PFC Austin's observation post came under a fierce ground attack by a large North Vietnamese Army force using a heavy volume of hand grenades, satchel charges, and small arms fire. Observing that one of his wounded companions had fallen unconscious in a position dangerously exposed to hostile fire, Austin unhesitatingly left the relative security of his fighting hole and, with complete disregard for his own safety, raced across the fire-swept terrain to drag the Marine to safety. As he neared his companion, he observed an enemy grenade land nearby. Leaping between the grenade and the injured Marine, Austin took the full force of the explosion himself. Although he was badly injured, Austin turned to help his fallen companion and saw a North Vietnamese soldier aiming a weapon at the unconscious man. With full knowledge of the probable consequences, Austin threw himself between the injured Marine and the hostile soldier. In doing so, Austin was mortally wounded. He is buried in Phoenix's Greenwood/Memory Lawn Mortuary & Cemetery.

== Medal of Honor citation ==
The President of the United States in the name of The Congress takes pride in presenting the MEDAL OF HONOR posthumously to

PRIVATE FIRST CLASS OSCAR P. AUSTIN
UNITED STATES MARINE CORPS

for service as set forth in the following CITATION:

For conspicuous gallantry and intrepidity at the risk of his life above and beyond the call of duty while serving as an Assistant Machine Gunner with Company E, Second Battalion, Seventh Marines, First Marine Division in connection with operations against enemy forces in the Republic of Vietnam. During the early morning hours of February 23, 1969, Private First Class Austin's observation post was subjected to a fierce ground attack by a large North Vietnamese Army force supported by a heavy volume of hand grenades, satchel charges and small arms fire. Observing that one of his wounded companions had fallen unconscious in a position dangerously exposed to the hostile fire, Private First Class Austin unhesitatingly left the relative security of his fighting hole and, with complete disregard for his own safety, raced across the fire-swept terrain to assist the Marine to a covered location. As he neared the casualty, he observed an enemy grenade land nearby and, reacting instantly, leaped between the injured Marine and the lethal object, absorbing the effect of its detonation. As he ignored his painful injuries and turned to examine the wounded man, he saw a North Vietnamese Army soldier aiming a weapon at his unconscious companion. With full knowledge of the probable consequences and thinking only to protect the Marine, Private First Class Austin resolutely threw himself between the casualty and the hostile soldier and, in so doing, was mortally wounded. Private First Class Austin's indomitable courage, inspiring initiative and selfless devotion to duty upheld the highest traditions of the Marine Corps and the United States Naval Service. He gallantly gave his life for his country.

/S/RICHARD M. NIXON

== Awards and decorations ==

1st row	Medal of Honor		
2nd row	Purple Heart	Combat Action Ribbon	Purple Heart
3rd row	Vietnam Service Medal with 2 Campaign stars	RVN Gallantry Cross Unit Citation with Palm	Vietnam Campaign Medal

== Other Honors ==
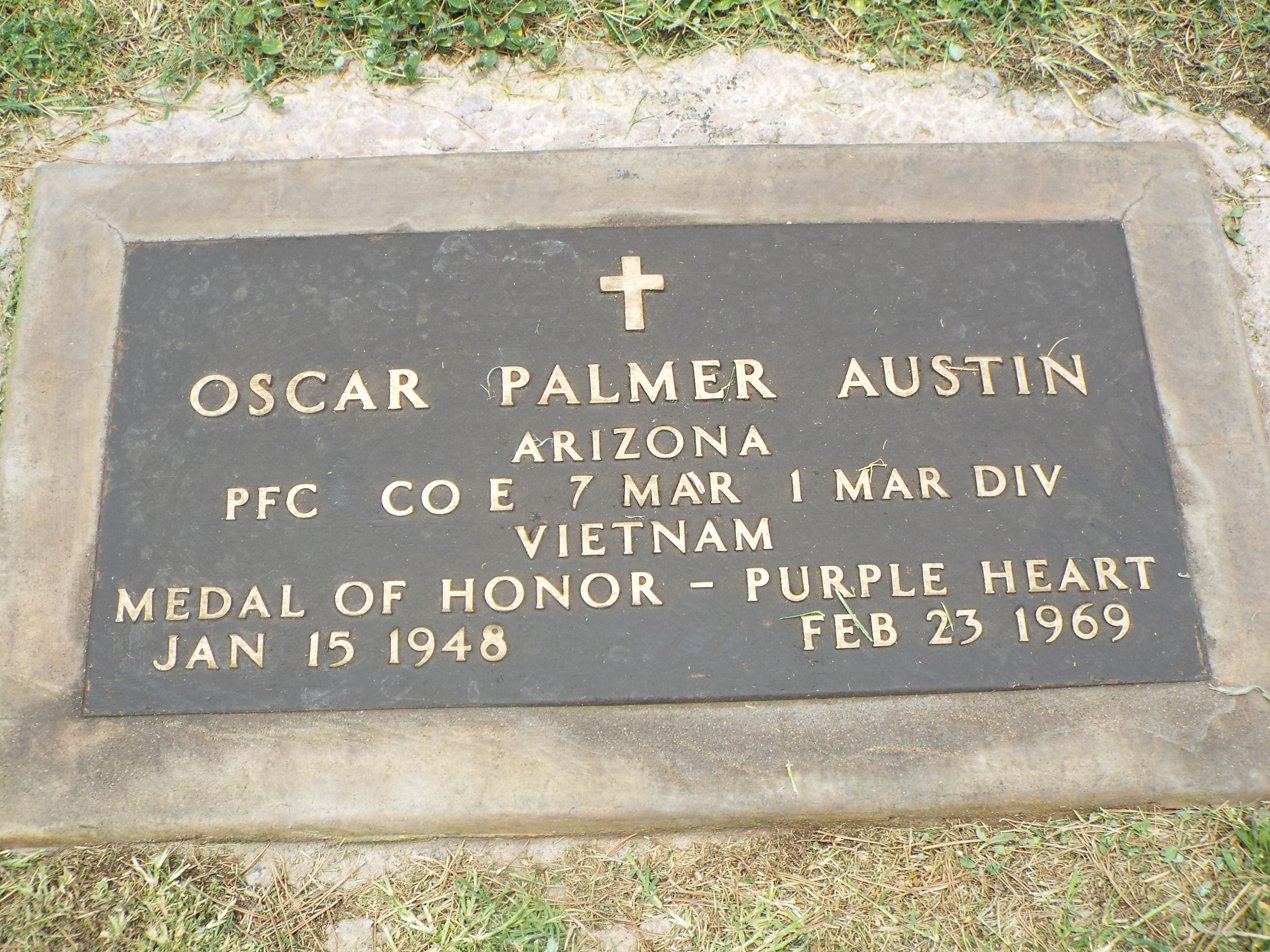
Gravesite of Oscar Palmer Austi

- The destroyer USS Oscar Austin (DDG-79), the first ship of the highly advanced Flight IIA subclass of the Arleigh Burke-class guided missile destroyer, commissioned in 2000, is named in his honor.
- Austin Hall Enlisted Club, The Basic School, Marine Corps Base Quantico, Virginia.

== See also ==
- List of Medal of Honor recipients
- List of Medal of Honor recipients for the Vietnam War
