= USS Oscar Austin =

Arleigh Burke-class destroyer

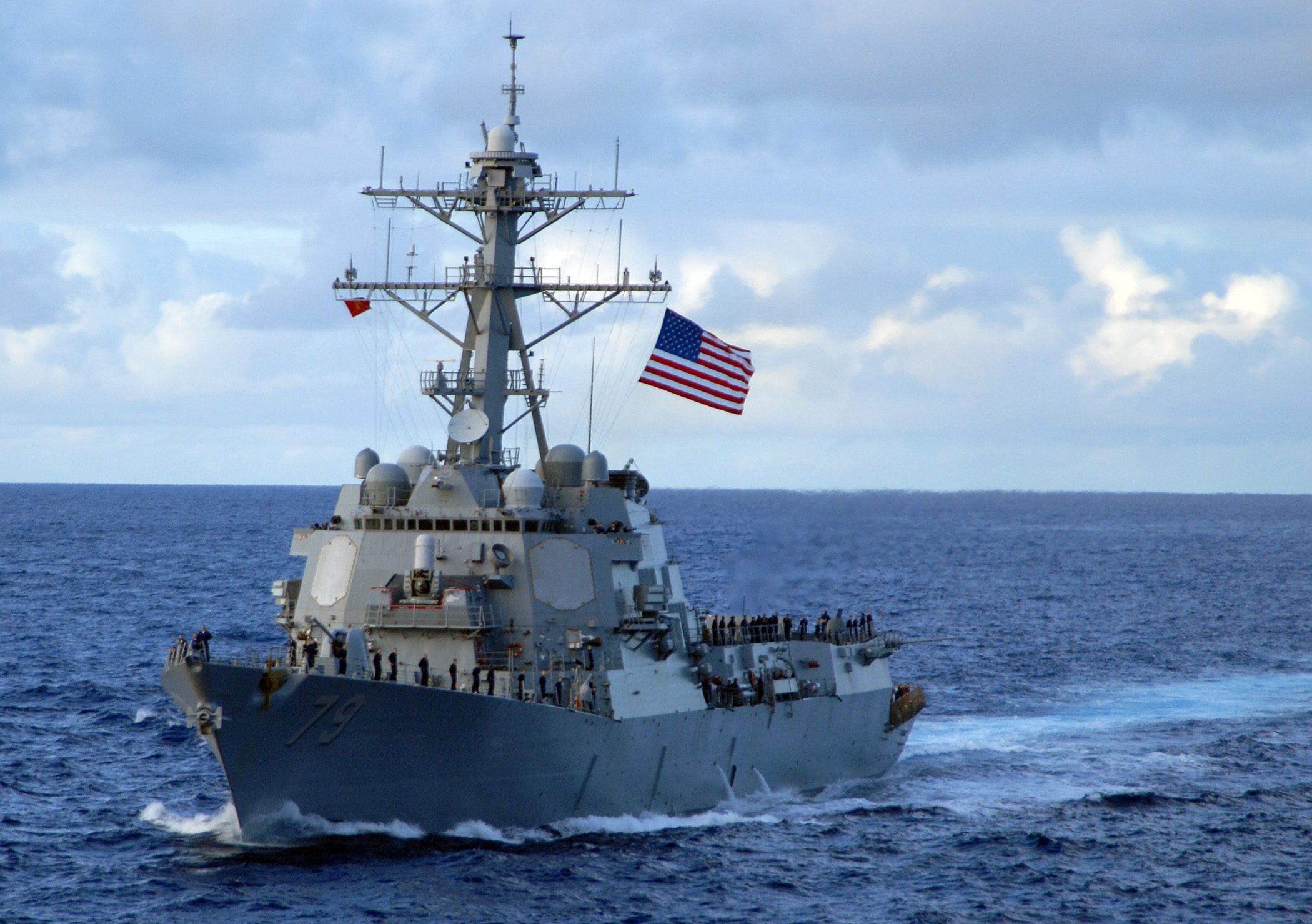
- USS Oscar Austin on 12 November 2007

History

United States
- Name: Oscar Austin
- Namesake: Oscar Palmer Austin
- Ordered: 20 July 1994
- Builder: Bath Iron Works
- Laid down: 9 October 1997
- Launched: 7 November 1998
- Commissioned: 19 August 2000
- Home port: Rota
- Identification: MMSI number: 334788000; Callsign: NOPA; Hull number: DDG-79
- Motto: Honor and Sacrifice
- Status: in active service
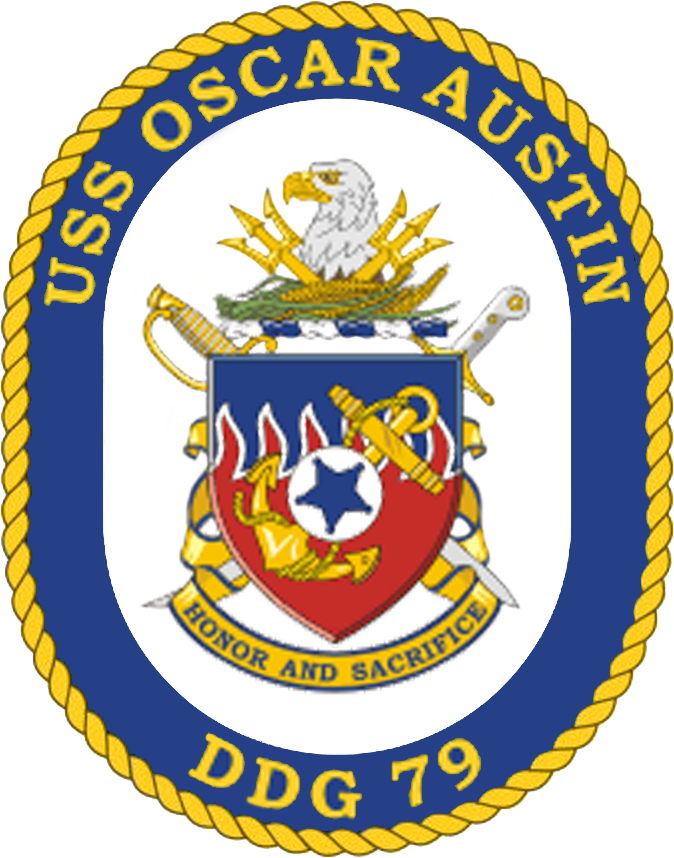
- Badge

General characteristics
- Class & type: Arleigh Burke-class destroyer
- Displacement: 9,200 long tons (9,300 t)
- Length: 509 ft 6 in (155.30 m)
- Beam: 66 ft (20 m)
- Draught: 31 ft (9.4 m)
- Propulsion: 4 × General Electric LM2500-30 gas turbines, 2 shafts, 100,000 shp (75 MW)
- Speed: 30 kn (56 km/h; 35 mph)
- Complement: 380 officers and enlisted
- Armament: Guns: 1 × 5-inch (127 mm)/54 mk 45 mod 1/2 (lightweight gun); 2 × 20 mm (0.8 in) Phalanx CIWS; 2 × 25 mm (0.98 in) Mk 38 machine gun system; 4 × 0.50 inches (12.7 mm) caliber guns; Missiles: 1 × 32-cell, 1 × 64-cell (96 total cells) Mk 41 vertical launching system (VLS): RIM-66M surface-to-air missile; RIM-156 surface-to-air missile; RIM-174A standard ERAM; RIM-161 anti-ballistic missile; RIM-162 ESSM (quad-packed); BGM-109 Tomahawk cruise missile; RUM-139 vertical launch ASROC; Torpedoes: 2 × Mark 32 triple torpedo tubes: Mark 46 lightweight torpedo; Mark 50 lightweight torpedo; Mark 54 lightweight torpedo
- Aircraft carried: 2 × MH-60R Seahawk helicopters

USS Oscar Austin (DDG-79) is an Arleigh Burke-class (Flight IIA) Aegis guided missile destroyer in the United States Navy and is the first of the Flight IIA variant. Oscar Austin is named for Medal of Honor and Purple Heart recipient Private First Class Oscar P. Austin. USS Oscar Austin was the 17th ship of this class to be built by Bath Iron Works in Bath, Maine, and construction began on 9 October 1997. She was launched and christened on 7 November 1998. On 19 August 2000 she was commissioned at Norfolk, Virginia. As of October 2024 the ship is part of Destroyer Squadron 60 based out of Naval Station Rota.

== Flight IIA ships ==
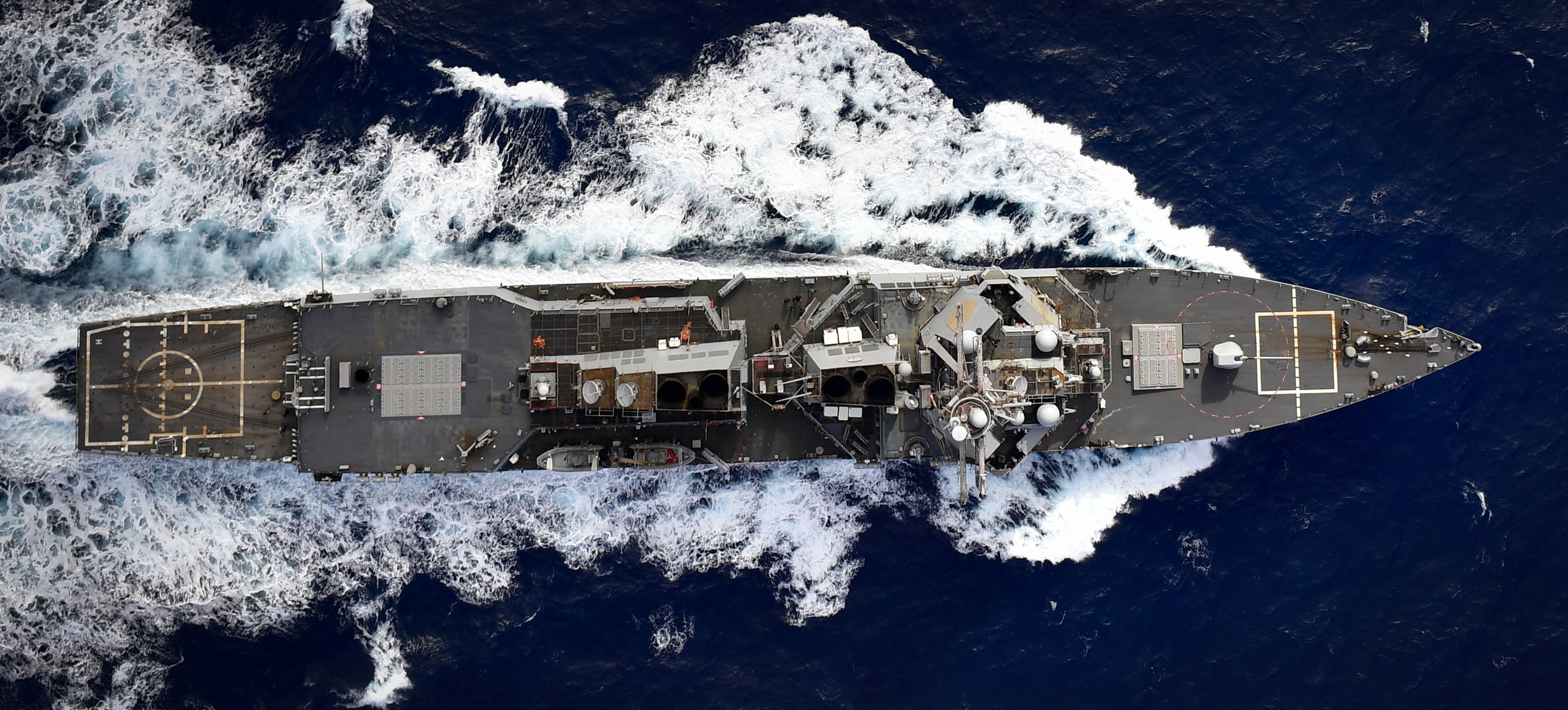
Oscar Austin seen from above in 2017

USS Oscar Austin is the first ship of the Flight IIA subclass of the Arleigh Burke-class destroyer. Compared to previous Burkes, Flight IIAs are 4 feet 6 inches (1.37 m) longer, displace about 900 tons more, carry six more Vertical Launching System cells, and have a hangar that can house two SH-60 Seahawk helicopters. To prevent the additional superstructure aft from fouling radar returns, the rear-facing SPY-1D panels are one deck higher. She is one of two Flight IIA ships using the older 5-inch/54 caliber naval gun, the other being USS Roosevelt (DDG-80), which cannot use certain advanced munitions that require the longer 5 in/62 caliber gun mounted on succeeding ships of the class like the USS Winston S. Churchill.

== Service history ==
USS Oscar Austin's maiden deployment in late 2002 resulted in her participation in the opening strikes of Operation Iraqi Freedom. She was deployed in September 2005, once again in support of Operation Iraqi Freedom. She returned from a successful deployment in March 2006.

As of 2007, USS Oscar Austin was operating in Destroyer Squadron 26.

As of 2008, USS Oscar Austin is the first combatant ship to deploy with a Scan Eagle UAV developed and flown by Insitu Inc.

As of 2015, USS Oscar Austin was operating in Destroyer Squadron 26.

On 10 November 2018, a fire broke out on Oscar Austin. The fire caused one sailor to be transported to a local hospital for smoke inhalation.

On March 4, 2026, during the 2026 Iran war, the Oscar Austin was credited with shooting down an Iranian surface-to-surface missile fired toward Incirlik Air Base with an SM-3 missile.

== Awards ==
- Presidential Unit Citation - (JUN 2026)
- Navy “E” Ribbon - (FY25)
- Combat Action Ribbon - (APR 2025)
- Marjorie Sterrett Battleship Fund Award - (2017)

== Coat of arms ==
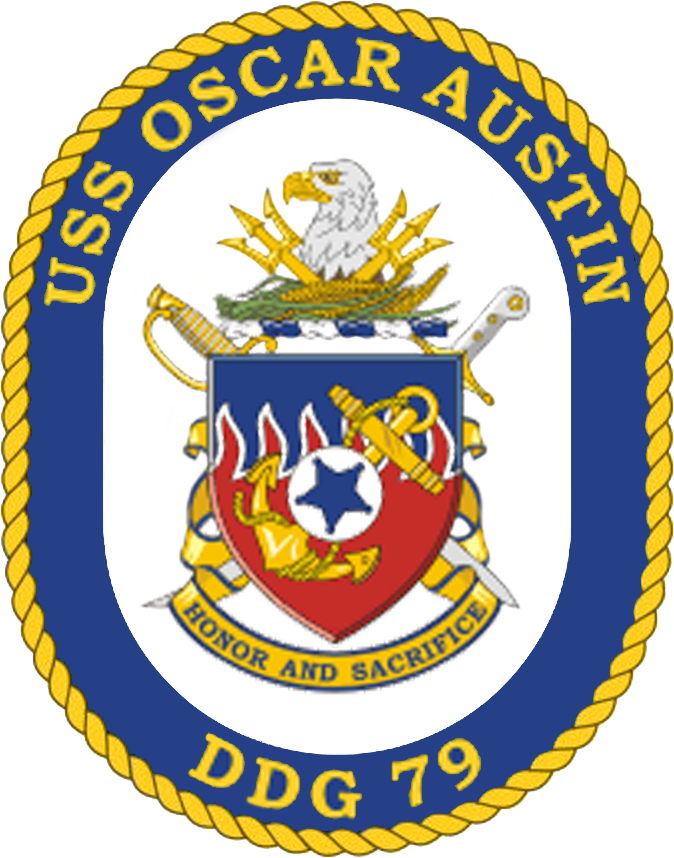

Shield

The shield has background of blue with red flames. The center encompasses a white globe with a reversed star center over an anchor.

The traditional Navy colors were chosen for the shield because dark blue and gold represents the sea and excellence respectively. Red signifies sacrifice and valor and white stands for integrity and purity of purpose. A reversed star represents the Medal of Honor awarded to Private First Class Oscar P. Austin, United States Marine Corps, for self-sacrifice and heroism he showed when throwing himself between an enemy grenade and an injured Marine. A white globe with a blue reversed star in the center are the Medal of Honor ribbon colors, while the reversed star is the silhouette of the pendant. The globe and anchor, also the USMC seal, signify the U.S. Navy's global mission. The flames represent the fire swept terrain as well as enemy fire where Austin sacrificed his life for comrades.

Crest

The crest consists of an eagle surrounded by crossing tridents and rice stalk.

Representing Oscar Austin's modern warfare capabilities such as the AEGIS combat systems are the tridents; symbols of sea prowess. The tridents' tines denote various warfare areas: air, surface, undersea. The crossed tridents prove multiple capabilities. The surrounding rice stalks signify Vietnam, where Austin served. The eagle symbolizes freedom, the principles of which the country were founded, and the sacrifice of his own life for others' freedom.

Motto

The motto is written on a scroll of gold with blue trim.

The ship's motto is "Honor and Sacrifice". The motto is a reference to the honorable sacrifice of Private First Class Oscar P. Austin and the Medal of Honor he received.

Seal

The coat of arms in full color as in the blazon, upon a white background enclosed within a dark blue oval border edged on the outside with a gold rope and bearing the inscription "USS Oscar Austin" at the top and "DDG 79" in the base all gold.
