= Millennium Challenge 2002 =

Major US war game exercise

Millennium Challenge 2002 (MC02) was a major war game exercise conducted by the United States Armed Forces under United States Joint Forces Command in mid-2002, running from 24 July to 15 August. The exercise involved both live exercises and computer simulations, costing US$250 million (equivalent to about $448M in 2025), the most expensive war game in US military history. MC02 was set in 2007, intended to be a test of future military "transformation"—a transition towards new technologies that enabled network-centric warfare, and providing a more effective command and control of current and future weaponry and tactics. The simulated combatants were the United States, referred to as "Blue", and a fictitious state in the Persian Gulf, "Red", often characterized as Iran or Iraq.

MC02 was an experiment mandated by Congress in 2000 to "explore critical war fighting challenges at the operational level of war that will confront United States joint military forces after 2010." The simulation took two years of planning and involved 13,000 troops. The Red force, led by retired Marine Corps Lieutenant General Paul K. Van Riper, used numerous asymmetrical tactics unanticipated by the Blue force; a pre-emptive cruise missile attack sank sixteen Blue warships and led to the exercise's suspension. The simulation was restarted with Blue forces fully restored, and Red forces heavily constrained from free-play "to the point where the end state was scripted", resulting in a Blue victory. Van Riper later criticized the cost of the exercise as "wasted".

== Scenario overview ==
MC02 was set in the year 2007, centered around a fictional regional power, "Red," located in a strategically significant area of the world. Following a devastating earthquake, Red experienced widespread instability, leading to the emergence of a renegade faction led by a military commander, known as CJTF-South. Operating independently from the central government, CJTF-South sought to assert control over Red and its surrounding region through several means including conventional military operations, asymmetric warfare, terrorism, economic manipulation, and propaganda.

One of the central points of conflict was a territorial dispute over a series of strategically important islands. CJTF-South seized these islands and established a controversial military escort service to protect ships navigating through the region, charging a toll for its services. This led to a direct military response from "Blue," whose primary objectives were to secure international shipping lanes, neutralize Red's weapons of mass effect (WME) capabilities, and restore sovereignty over the disputed islands, as mandated by a World Court ruling. Additionally, Blue sought to halt CJTF-South's push for regional hegemony.

The opposing forces in the scenario consisted of several distinct elements: CJTF-South’s military forces, the national leadership of the Government of Red (GOR), and a variety of terrorist groups, including pirates, mercenaries, and criminal organizations. Each of these groups had different objectives, but common goals among them included resisting Blue’s presence and influence in the region, maintaining or restoring power in Red, and advancing their own political or economic agendas.

CJTF-South's aims were to preserve its political influence, deter Blue intervention, limit Blue’s strategic objectives, and promote economic recovery in the aftermath of the earthquake, while also consolidating regional control and influence. The GOR similarly sought to maintain its hold on power, limit foreign intervention, and aid in the country's recovery. Meanwhile, terrorist factions focused on disrupting Blue’s operations, attacking rival political and religious groups, and destabilizing the region further.

== Constraints ==
Since the war game allowed for a ship-to-shore landing of ground troops at some unknown point during the 14 day exercise, and because their naval force was substantial, the Blue force was positioned on the shore-side of the region's active shipping lanes to keep them from impacting commerce during the exercise. This placed them near the Red shore rather than at a "standoff" distance. Conducting the war games during peacetime also meant that there were a large number of friendly or unaligned ships and aircraft in the zone, restricting the use of automated defense systems and more cautious Rules of Engagement. Red's tactics took full advantage of these factors to great effect.

== Exercise action ==
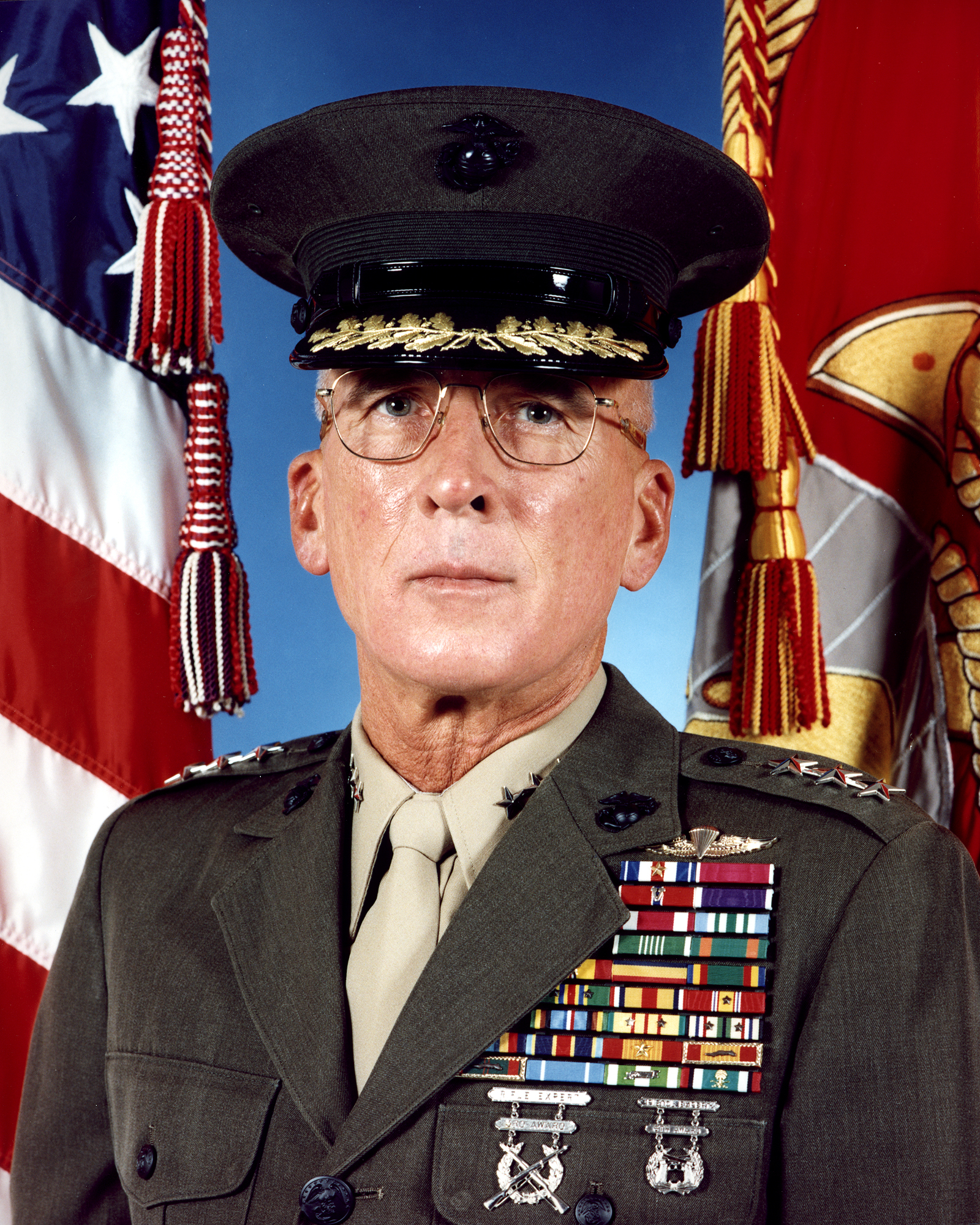
Lt. Gen. Paul Van Riper

Red, commanded by retired Marine Corps Lieutenant General Paul K. Van Riper, adopted an asymmetric strategy. In particular, Red utilized old methods to evade Blue's sophisticated electronic surveillance network: Van Riper simulated using motorcycle messengers to transmit orders to front-line troops and World-War-II-style light signals to launch airplanes without radio communications in the model.

Red received an ultimatum from Blue, essentially a surrender document, demanding a response within 24 hours. Thus warned of Blue's approach, Red used a fleet of small boats to determine the position of Blue's fleet by the second day of the exercise. In a preemptive strike, Red launched a massive salvo of cruise missiles that overwhelmed the Blue forces' electronic sensors and destroyed sixteen warships: one aircraft carrier, ten cruisers and five of Blue's six amphibious ships. An equivalent success in a real conflict would have resulted in the deaths of over 20,000 service personnel. Soon after the cruise missile offensive, another significant portion of Blue's navy was "sunk" by an armada of small Red boats, which carried out both conventional and suicide attacks that capitalized on Blue's inability to detect them as well as expected.

Such defeat can be attributed to various shortfalls in simulation capabilities and design that significantly hindered Blue Force fighting and command capabilities. Examples include: a time lag in intelligence, surveillance, and reconnaissance information being forwarded to the Blue Force by the simulation master, various glitches that limited Blue ships point-defense capabilities and error in the simulation which placed ships unrealistically close to Red assets.

== Exercise suspension and restart ==
At this point, the exercise was suspended, Blue's ships were "re-floated", and the rules of engagement were changed; this was later justified by General Peter Pace as follows: "You kill me in the first day and I sit there for the next 13 days doing nothing, or you put me back to life and you get 13 more days' worth of experiment out of me. Which is a better way to do it?"

After the war game was restarted, its participants were forced to follow a script drafted to ensure a Blue Force victory. Among other rules imposed by this script, Red Force was ordered to turn on their anti-aircraft radar in order for them to be destroyed, and during a combined parachute assault by the 82nd Airborne Division and Marines air assaulting on the then new and still controversial MV-22, Van Riper's forces were ordered not to shoot down any of the approaching aircraft. Van Riper also claimed that exercise officials denied him the opportunity to use his own tactics and ideas against Blue Force, and that they also ordered Red Force not to use certain weapons systems against Blue Force and even ordered the location of Red Force units to be revealed. The postmortem JFCOM report on MC02 would say "As the exercise progressed, the OPFOR free-play was eventually constrained to the point where the end state was scripted. This scripting ensured a blue team operational victory and established conditions in the exercise for transition operations."

== Aftermath ==
The rule changes following the restart led to accusations that the war game had turned from an honest, open, free playtest of U.S. war-fighting capabilities into a rigidly controlled and scripted exercise intended to end in an overwhelming U.S. victory, alleging that "$250 million was wasted". Van Riper was extremely critical of the scripted nature of the new exercise and resigned from the exercise in the middle of the war game. Van Riper later said that Vice Admiral Marty Mayer altered the exercise's purpose to reinforce existing doctrine and notions within the U.S. military rather than serving as a learning experience.

Van Riper also stated that the war game was rigged so that it appeared to validate the modern, joint-service war-fighting concepts it was supposed to be testing. He was quoted in the ZDF–New York Times documentary The Perfect War (2004) as saying that what he saw in MC02 echoed the same view promoted by the Department of Defense under Robert McNamara before and during the Vietnam War, namely that the U.S. military could not and would not be defeated.

Responding to Van Riper's criticism, Vice Admiral Mayer, who ran the war game and who was charged with developing the military's joint concepts and requirements, stated the following:

Gen. Van Riper apparently feels he was too constrained. I can only say there were certain parts where he was not constrained, and then there were parts where he was in order to facilitate the conduct of the experiment and certain exercise pieces that were being done.

— Vice Admiral Marty Mayer

Navy Captain John Carman, Joint Forces Command spokesman, said the war game had properly validated all the major concepts which were tested by Blue Force, ignoring the restrictions placed on Van Riper's Red Force that led them to succeed. Based on these findings, Carman stated that recommendations based on the war game's result on areas such as doctrine, training, and procurement would be forwarded to General Richard Myers, the chairman of the Joint Chiefs of Staff.
