= Transformation (warfare) =

Transformation is a buzzword popularized by Donald Rumsfeld referring to a "change of mindset that will allow the [US] military to harness the technological advances of the information age to gain a qualitative advantage over any potential foe."

Currently it is composed of three ideas.

"The three key elements of transformation thus far are knowledge, speed and precision. Knowledge, in the sense of being able to use the technical means at our disposal to seek, to track and to find out what the enemy is all about; speed: strategic speed, the ability to project forces over great distances very, very quickly; and precision is the ability to strike the enemy with sort of surgical strikes to kill the enemy quickly." Robert Scales Jr., Battle Plan Under Fire, Transcripts

"its key doctrine is 'network-centric warfare,' a strategy that has friendly combatants networked together for a previously unknown degree of fighting effectiveness." from Nova, Battle Plan Under Fire, Transformation

Transformation - The creation of a force that is dominant across the full spectrum of military operations - persuasive in peace, decisive in war, preeminent in any form of conflict.

== See also ==
- Transformation of the United States Army
- Millennium Challenge 2002
- Revolution in Military Affairs
- Network-centric warfare
