= Robert S. Kennemore =

United States Marine and Medal of Honor recipient (1920–1989)

Robert Sidney Kennemore
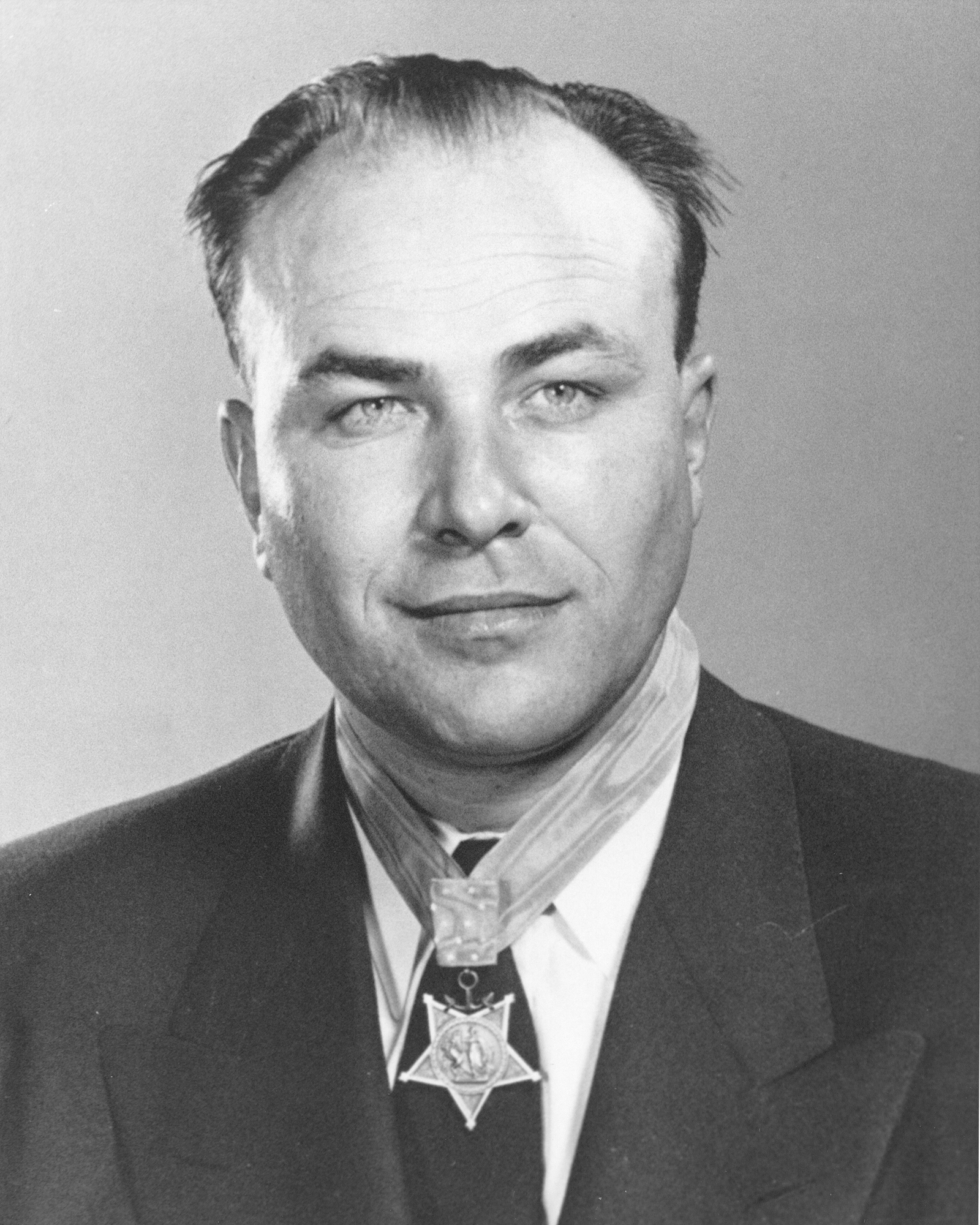
- Born: June 21, 1920; Greenville, South Carolina
- Died: April 26, 1989 (aged 68); Oakland, California
- Burial place: San Francisco National Cemetery
- Military career
- Allegiance: United States
- Branch: United States Marine Corps
- Service years: 1940–1951
- Rank: Staff Sergeant
- Units: Company E, 2nd Battalion, 7th Marines, 1st Marine Division
- Conflicts: World War II: Battle of Guadalcanal; Korean War: Second Battle of Seoul; Battle of Chosin Reservoir
- Awards: Medal of Honor; Purple Heart

Robert Sidney Kennemore (June 21, 1920 – April 26, 1989) was a United States Marine who was awarded the Medal of Honor for his actions during the Battle of Chosin Reservoir in November 1950, when he deliberately covered an enemy grenade with his foot to keep his men from being wounded or killed. Staff Sergeant Kennemore, who lost both of his legs in the incident, was the 23rd marine to receive his nation's highest award for heroism in Korea. The medal was presented to him by President Harry S. Truman during a ceremony at the White House on November 24, 1952.

== Early life ==
Kennemore was born on June 21, 1920, in Greenville, South Carolina. He attended high school in Simpsonville, South Carolina, until 1935, and was employed by the Montgomery Ward Company, in Chicago, Illinois, before enlisting in the United States Marine Corps on June 20, 1940.

== Military career ==
Completing his recruit training in Marine Corps Recruit Depot San Diego, California, in August 1940, Kennemore was stationed there until July 1942, when he sailed for the Pacific theater with the 1st Marine Division. After serving with the division in the Guadalcanal-Tulagi campaign, he returned to the United States in June 1943 for duty at Camp Lejeune, North Carolina.

In February 1944, Kennemore was ordered to Camp Pendleton, California, where he served until that September. He was then stationed at the Marine Barracks, Klamath Falls, Oregon, until February 1945, when he was assigned to the Marine Barracks, at the Naval Air Station, Boca Chica, Florida. In July 1945, after brief service at Camp Lejeune, he re-embarked for the Pacific and, following the end of the war, served in Japan on occupation duty with the 2nd Marine Division. He returned to the States in April 1946, and served briefly at San Diego and the Marine Barracks, New Orleans, Louisiana, until September 1946, when he began a year of duty at the Marine Barracks, Naval Mine Depot, Yorktown, Virginia. In September 1947, he was ordered to New York City, where he served for two years at Headquarters of the 3rd Marine Corps Reserve District.

Staff Sergeant Kennemore joined the 2nd Battalion, 6th Marine Regiment, 2nd Marine Division, at Camp Lejeune, in October 1949, and with the outbreak of the Korean War, moved with the battalion to the west coast in July 1950. The 2nd Battalion was made part of the 7th Marines, 1st Marine Division in August 1950, and the following month, Kennemore embarked for Korea, where he served with the 2nd Battalion in the Second Battle of Seoul and Battle of Chosin Reservoir.

It was at the Chosin Reservoir that Kennemore lost both of his legs. Kennemore was fighting in a slit trench alongside two other marines when a grenade landed beside him. Without regard to his safety he grabbed the grenade and threw it back. Immediately after, another grenade landed in the trench, and he used his foot to push it into the earth. At this point he noticed yet another grenade lying close by. Without hesitation he kneeled down on the third grenade and effectively absorbed the blast of the two grenades through his legs. Due to his actions, Kennemore saved the lives of two fellow marines. Kennemore returned to the United States in December 1950 for treatment at the U.S. Naval Hospital, Oakland, California. He remained there for almost a year, until his retirement on October 31, 1951.

== Later life ==
Kennemore was a participant at the 1956 Republican National Convention as the leader of the Pledge of Allegiance on the first day.

Kennemore died on April 26, 1989. He was buried in the San Francisco National Cemetery, San Francisco, California

== Medal of Honor citation ==
The President of the United States in the name of The Congress pleasure in presenting the MEDAL OF HONOR to

STAFF SERGEANT ROBERT S. KENNEMORE
UNITED STATES MARINE CORPS

for service as set forth in the following CITATION:

For conspicuous gallantry and intrepidity at the risk of his life above and beyond the call of duty as Leader of a Machine-Gun Section in Company E, Second Battalion, Seventh Marines, First Marine Division (Reinforced), in action against enemy aggressor forces in Korea on 27 and November 28, 1950. With the company's defensive perimeter overrun by a numerically superior hostile force during a savage night attack north of Yudam-ni and his platoon commander seriously wounded, Staff Sergeant Kennemore unhesitatingly assumed command, quickly reorganized the unit and directed the men in consolidating the position. When an enemy grenade landed in the midst of a machine-gun squad, he bravely placed his foot on the missile and, in the face of almost certain death, personally absorbed the full force of the explosion to prevent injury to his fellow Marines. By his indomitable courage, outstanding leadership and selfless efforts in behalf of his comrades, Staff Sergeant Kennemore was greatly instrumental in driving the enemy from the area and upheld the highest traditions of the United States Naval Service.

/S/ HARRY S. TRUMAN

== Awards and Decorations ==
Staff Sergeant Kennemore received the following awards for his service.

1st row	Medal of Honor	Purple Heart	Combat Action Ribbon Retroactively Awarded, 1999
2nd row	Navy Presidential Unit Citation with 2 Service stars	Marine Corps Good Conduct Medal with 2 Service stars	American Defense Service Medal
3rd row	American Campaign Medal	Asiatic-Pacific Campaign Medal with 2 Campaign stars	World War II Victory Medal
4th row	Navy Occupation Service Medal with 'Asia' clasp	National Defense Service Medal	Korean Service Medal with 2 Campaign stars
3rd row	Korean Presidential Unit Citation	United Nations Service Medal Korea	Korean War Service Medal Retroactively Awarded, 2003

== Namesakes ==
The Marine Corps League Detachment #1105 in Greenville, South Carolina, the Owens/Kennemore Detachment, is named for the two Greenville Medal of Honor recipients — Robert Kennemore and World War II recipient Robert A. Owens.

== See also ==
- List of Korean War Medal of Honor recipients
