= Dehart, Kentucky =

Unincorporated community in Kentucky, United States

- Unincorporated community
- Location within Kentucky Location within the United States
- Coordinates: 37°57′52″N 83°20′14″W
- Country: United States
- State: Kentucky
- County: Morgan
- Elevation: 875 ft (267 m)
- Time zone: UTC-5 (Eastern (EST))
  - Summer (DST): UTC-4 (EDT)
- GNIS feature ID: 511777

Dehart is an unincorporated community in Morgan County, Kentucky, United States.

== History ==
Dehart is on Greasy Creek about a mile from its mouth on the Licking River. Settlement began circa 1836 and the Mussel Shoals School was established nearby in 1880. The Dehart post office, named for Daniel Boone DeHart, the first postmaster, opened in 1909 and closed in 1963.
