= Rodney Maxwell Davis =

American Vietnam War Medal of Honor recipient

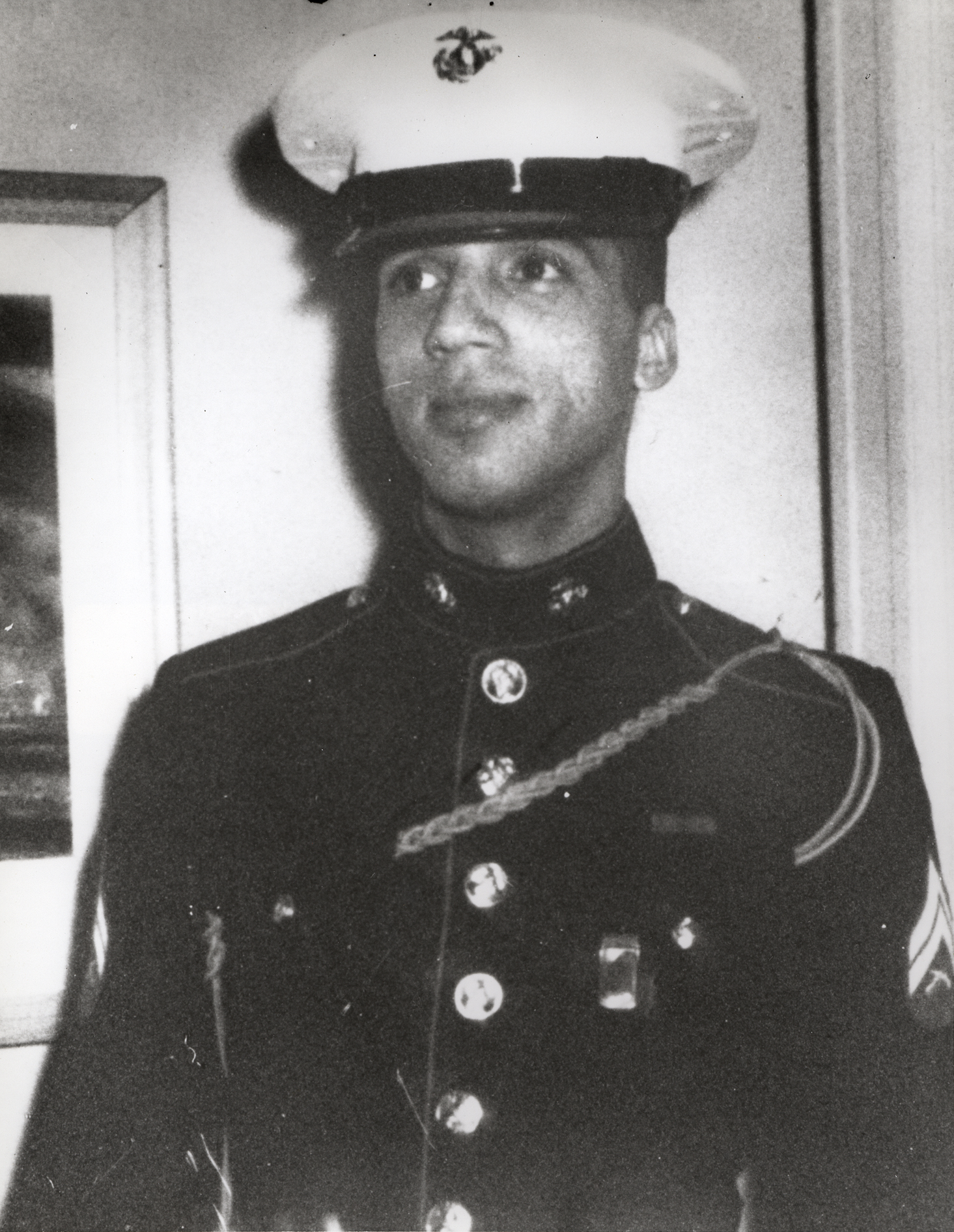
- Born: April 7, 1942; Macon, Georgia, U.S.
- Died: September 6, 1967 (aged 25); Que Son District, Quảng Nam Province, South Vietnam
- Burial place: Linwood Cemetery, Macon, Georgia
- Military career
- Allegiance: United States of America
- Branch: United States Marine Corps
- Service years: 1961–1967
- Rank: Sergeant
- Units: Company B, 1st Battalion, 5th Marines, 1st Marine Division
- Conflicts: Vietnam War: Operation Swift †
- Awards: Medal of Honor; Purple Heart Medal; Combat Action Ribbon; Republic of Vietnam Military Merit Medal; Republic of Vietnam Gallantry Cross

Rodney Maxwell Davis (April 7, 1942 – September 6, 1967) was a non-commissioned officer in the United States Marine Corps who was posthumously awarded the Medal of Honor for heroism above and beyond the call of duty in 1967, during the Vietnam War.

Davis joined the Marine Corps in 1961 and was ordered to the Republic of Vietnam in 1967. In September 1967, during a search and destroy exercise as part of Operation Swift, Davis' company was attacked by enemies. When his platoon retreated into a trench, Davis ran up and down his company's line and encouraged the men to fight, returning fire at the same time. When an enemy grenade came close to several men, Davis jumped on the grenade, saving his men's lives.

== Biography ==
Davis was born on April 7, 1942, in Macon, Georgia, to Gordon N. Davis and Ruth A. Davis. He attended elementary school and high school there and graduated from Peter G. Appling High School, May 29, 1961.

Shortly after graduation, Davis enlisted in the United States Marine Corps in his hometown on August 31, 1961; then reported for recruit training with the First Recruit Training Battalion Marine Corps Recruit Depot Parris Island, South Carolina. Upon completion of recruit training in December 1961, Davis was transferred to the Marine Corps Base, Camp Lejeune, North Carolina, and underwent Individual Combat Training with the Second Battalion, First Infantry Training Regiment, graduating the following February.

Davis then joined Company K, 3rd Battalion, 2nd Marines, 2nd Marine Division, FMF, at Camp Lejeune and served as a rifleman until May 1964. While stationed at Camp Lejeune, he was promoted to private first class on April 1, 1962, and to lance corporal on January 1, 1964.

As a lance corporal, Davis was ordered to London, England, for a three-year tour of duty as a Guard with the United States Marine Detachment, Naval Activities. He was promoted to corporal on January 1, 1966, and to sergeant on December 1, 1966.

Ordered to the Republic of Vietnam in August 1967, Davis was assigned duty as a Platoon Guide with Company B, First Battalion, Fifth Marines, First Marine Division. On September 6, 1967, he was operating with his unit in the Quảng Nam Province on a search and clear mission during Operation Swift, when they were attacked by a large North Vietnamese force. Elements of the platoon were pinned down in a trench line by mortars, heavy automatic and small-arms fire. Davis went from man to man encouraging them on and also returning fire at the same time. An enemy hand grenade fell in the trenches his men were fighting from and without hesitation, Davis threw himself upon the grenade, saving his fellow Marines in this selfless act and thus earned the nation's highest military decoration: the Medal of Honor.

Presentation of the medal was made posthumously to Davis' widow, Mrs. Judy P. Davis, by Vice President Spiro T. Agnew in his office. The presentation is "in the name of the Congress of the United States."

Davis was survived by his wife, Judy, and two daughters, Nichola Davis and Samantha J. Davis-Steen. His grandson, Tyler Steen, was drafted by the Philadelphia Eagles in the 2023 NFL draft.

== After death ==
The City of Macon did not allow black decedents to be buried inside the city limits in 1967, in specific cemeteries. Davis was buried in an all-black cemetery in the city. About 2010, several white Marines were driving by Macon, including one man who was saved by Davis. They stopped to pay their respects at his gravesite and were angered to find that the wooden monument to Davis was rotting, and the cemetery was covered in weeds and had many headstones falling over. They removed all the weeds around Davis's grave and many graves around it, and cleaned up a section of the cemetery before leaving. The 1st Battalion, 5th Marines Association was informed and donations arranged. Civilians and other Marines, families, and surviving spouses accumulated over $60,000 and a large, granite monument was built at Davis's grave site. Several times a year, a gathering is organized and the entire cemetery is weeded and tended to. Donations continue to be accumulated and are now used mainly for scholarships of deserving children.

== Military awards ==
Davis' decorations and awards include:

	Medal of Honor	
Purple Heart Medal	Combat Action Ribbon	Navy Presidential Unit Citation
Marine Corps Good Conduct Medal w/ one 3/16" bronze star	National Defense Service Medal	Vietnam Service Medal w/ one 3/16" bronze star
Republic of Vietnam Military Merit Medal	Republic of Vietnam Gallantry Cross w/ palm	Republic of Vietnam Campaign Medal w/ 1960- device

== Medal of Honor citation ==
The President of the United States in the name of The Congress takes pride in presenting the MEDAL OF HONOR posthumously to

SERGEANT RODNEY M. DAVIS
UNITED STATES MARINE CORPS

for service as set forth in the following

CITATION:

For conspicuous gallantry and intrepidity at the risk of his life above and beyond the call of duty while serving as the right guide of the Second Platoon, Company B, First Battalion, Fifth Marines, First Marine Division, in action against enemy forces in Quang Nam Province, Republic of Vietnam, on September 6, 1967. Elements of the Second Platoon were pinned down by a numerically superior force of attacking North Vietnamese Army Regulars. Remnants of the platoon were located in a trench line where Sergeant Davis was directing the fire of his men in an attempt to repel the enemy attack. Disregarding the enemy hand grenades and high volume of small arms and mortar fire, Sergeant Davis moved from man to man shouting words of encouragement to each of them firing and throwing grenades at the onrushing enemy. When an enemy grenade landed in the trench in the midst of his men, Sergeant Davis, realizing the gravity of the situation, and in a final valiant act of complete self-sacrifice, instantly threw himself upon the grenade, absorbing with his own body the full and terrific force of the explosion. Through his extraordinary initiative and inspiring valor in the face of almost certain death, Sergeant Davis saved his comrades from injury and possible loss of life, enabled his platoon to hold its vital position, and upheld the highest traditions of the Marine Corps and the United States Naval Service. He gallantly gave his life for his country.

/S/ RICHARD M. NIXON

== Legacy ==
- The frigate USS Rodney M. Davis (FFG-60) was named in his honor. The decommissioned USS Rodney M. Davis hit by a missile as part of 2022 RIMPAC exercises. (U.S. Navy, courtesy DVIDS)

== See also ==
- List of Medal of Honor recipients
- List of Medal of Honor recipients for the Vietnam War

== Sources ==
- "Official Marine Corps biography".
- "Medal of Honor citation". Archived from the original on July 14, 2007.
- "USS Rodney M. Davis official website". Archived from the original on March 1, 2001.
