= Lawrence D. Peters =

United States Marine Corps Medal of Honor recipient

Lawrence David Peters
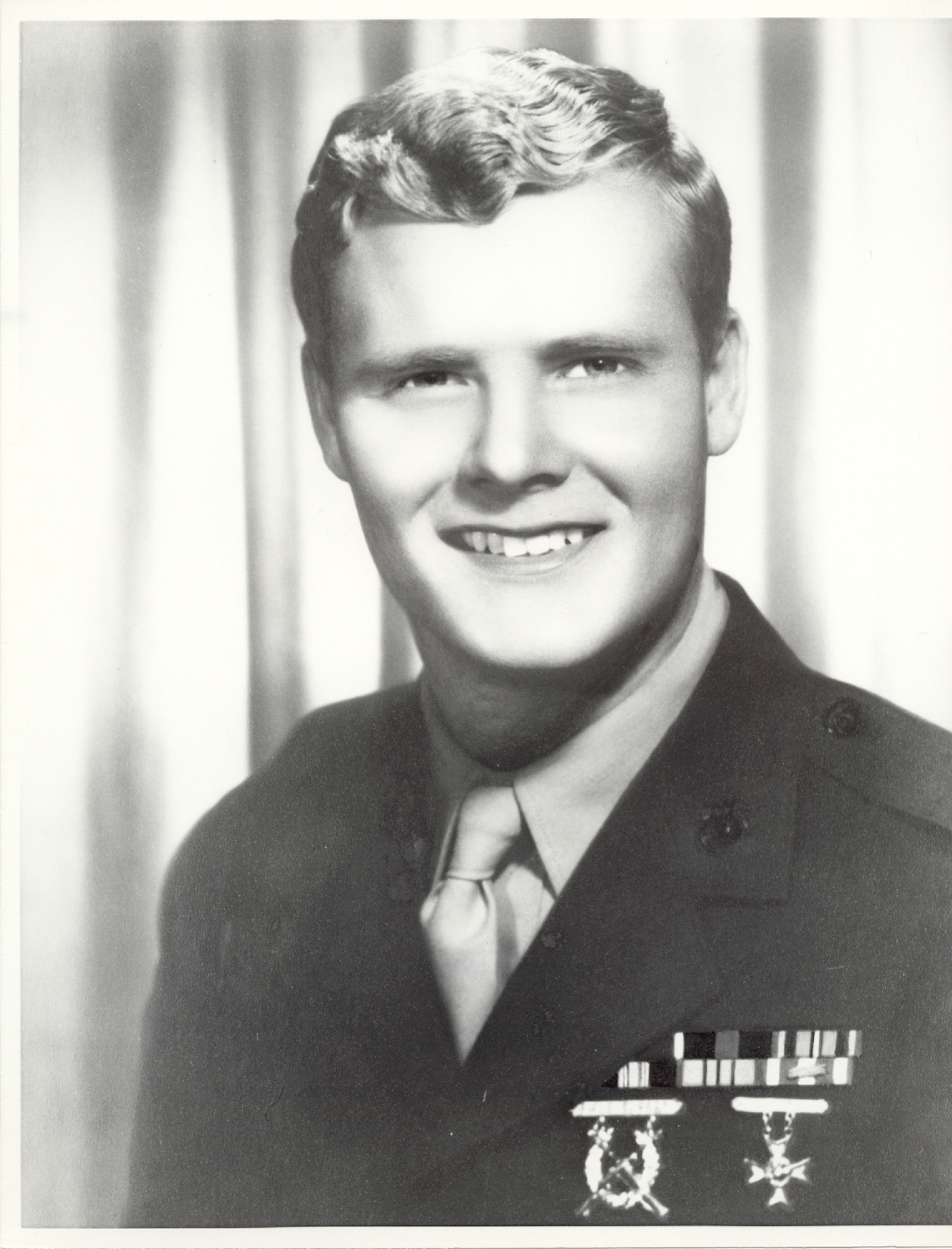
- Lawrence D. Peters, posthumous Medal of Honor recipient
- Born: September 16, 1946; Johnson City, New York, U.S.
- Died: September 4, 1967 (aged 20); Quảng Tín Province, South Vietnam
- Burial place: Chenango Valley Cemetery, Binghamton, New York
- Military career
- Allegiance: United States of America
- Branch: United States Marine Corps
- Service years: 1963–1967
- Rank: Sergeant
- Units: Company M, 3rd Battalion, 5th Marines, 1st Marine Division
- Conflicts: Vietnam War: Operation Swift †
- Awards: Medal of Honor; Purple Heart

Lawrence David Peters (September 16, 1946 – September 4, 1967) was a United States Marine who posthumously received the Medal of Honor for his heroic actions on September 4, 1967, during the Vietnam War.

== Biography ==
Lawrence Peters was born on September 16, 1946, in Johnson City, New York. He attended Benjamin Franklin Elementary and Junior High Schools in Binghamton, New York, and graduated from Binghamton North High School in Binghamton, New York in 1964.

While still in high school, he enlisted in the U.S. Marine Corps Reserve (USMCR) on September 18, 1963, and was assigned to the 48th Rifle Company, USMCR, Binghamton.

In September 1964, he completed recruit training with the 1st Recruit Training Battalion, Recruit Training Regiment, Marine Corps Recruit Depot Parris Island, South Carolina. In October, he completed individual combat training with the 1st Infantry Training Battalion, Marine Corps Base Camp Lejeune, North Carolina; and advanced infantry combat training in December with the 2nd Infantry Training Battalion, at the same installation.

Upon completion of his training, he returned to Binghamton, where he remained with the 48th Rifle Company until he was discharged to enlist in the Regular Marine Corps on January 30, 1966. He was promoted to private first class on December 16, 1964; to Lance Corporal on July 1, 1965; and to Corporal on January 1, 1966.

Corporal Peters requested assignment to Fleet Marine Forces, Pacific, and in March 1966, joined Staging Battalion, Marine Corps Base Camp Pendleton, California, for transfer overseas.

In May 1966, he joined Company D, 1st Battalion, 3rd Marines, 3rd Marine Division in the Republic of Vietnam, and served consecutively as fire team leader, squad leader, and non-commissioned officer in charge of the Combined Action Company. He was promoted to Sergeant on September 1, 1966. In November 1966, he served on temporary additional duty as company gunnery sergeant with Headquarters Company, 7th Engineer Battalion (Combined Action Company).

That December, he was transferred to Combined Action Company, Sub Unit #1, Service Company, Headquarters Battalion, 1st Marine Division, where he served as non-commissioned officer in charge, until April 1967. He then served with the Military Police Company, attached to the 1st Marine Division, until the following July.

Sergeant Peters next served as squad leader of Company M, 3rd Battalion, 5th Marines, 1st Marine Division. While serving in this capacity, on September 4, 1967, he was killed in action during Operation Swift in Quang Tin Province. For his "indomitable fighting spirit and determination against overwhelming odds," Sergeant Peters was awarded the Medal of Honor.

He is buried in Chenango Valley Cemetery in Binghamton, New York.

== Medal of Honor citation ==
The President of the United States in the name of The Congress takes pride in presenting the MEDAL OF HONOR posthumously to

SERGEANT LAWRENCE D. PETERS
UNITED STATES MARINE CORPS

for service as set forth in the following CITATION:

For conspicuous gallantry and intrepidity at the risk of his life above and beyond the call of duty while serving as a Squad Leader with Company M, Third Battalion, Fifth Marines, First Marine Division in the Republic of Vietnam on 4 September 1967. During Operation SWIFT, in the province of Quang Tin, the Marines of the second platoon of Company M were struck by intense mortar, machine gun, and small arms fire from an entrenched enemy force. As the company rallied its forces, Sergeant Peters maneuvered his squad in an assault on an enemy defended knoll disregarding his safety, as enemy rounds hit all about him, he stood in the open, pointing out enemy positions until he was painfully wounded in the leg. Disregarding his wound he moved forward and continued to lead his men. As the enemy fire increased in accuracy and volume, his squad lost its momentum and was temporarily pinned down. Exposing himself to devastating enemy fire, he consolidated his position to render more effective fire. While directing the base of fire, he was wounded a second time in the face and neck from an exploding mortar round. As the enemy attempted to infiltrate the position of an adjacent platoon, Sergeant Peters stood erect in the full view of the enemy firing burst after burst forcing them to disclose their camouflaged positions. Sergeant Peters continued firing until he was critically wounded by a gunshot wound in his chest. Although unable to walk or stand, Sergeant Peters steadfastly continued to direct his squad in spite of two additional wounds, persisted in his efforts to encourage and supervise his men until; he lost consciousness and succumbed. Inspired by his selfless actions, the squad regained fire superiority and once again carried the assault to the enemy. By his outstanding valor, indomitable fighting spirit and tenacious determination in the face of overwhelming odds, Sergeant Peters upheld the highest traditions of the Marine Corps and the United States Naval Service. He gallantly gave his life for his country.

/S/ RICHARD M. NIXON

== Awards and decorations ==
Sgt Peters was awarded the following medals:

| | Medal of Honor | |
| Purple Heart | Presidential Unit Citation with one bronze star | National Defense Service Medal |
| Vietnam Service Medal with three bronze stars | Vietnam Gallantry Cross with Palm | Republic of Vietnam Campaign Medal |

== See also ==
- List of Medal of Honor recipients
- List of Medal of Honor recipients for the Vietnam War
