= Ernest A. Janson =

American soldier and hero of the Battle of Belleau Wood

Ernest August Janson, aka Charles F. Hoffman
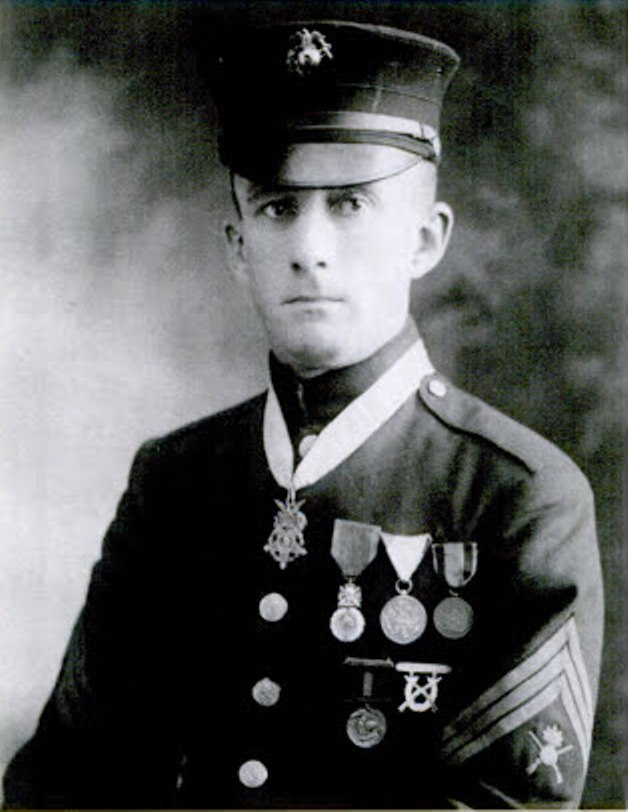
- World War I Army and Navy Medal of Honor recipient
- Born: August 17, 1878; New York City, U.S.
- Died: May 14, 1930 (aged 51); Long Island, New York, U.S.
- Burial place: Evergreen Cemetery, Brooklyn, New York
- Military career
- Allegiance: United States
- Branch: United States Army; United States Marine Corps
- Service years: c1900-c1910 (US Army); 1910–1926 (USMC)
- Rank: Sergeant major
- Units: 1st Battalion, 5th Marines, 5th Marine Regiment
- Conflicts: Nicaraguan Campaign; World War I: Battle of Belleau Wood
- Awards: Medal of Honor (2); Silver Star; Purple Heart

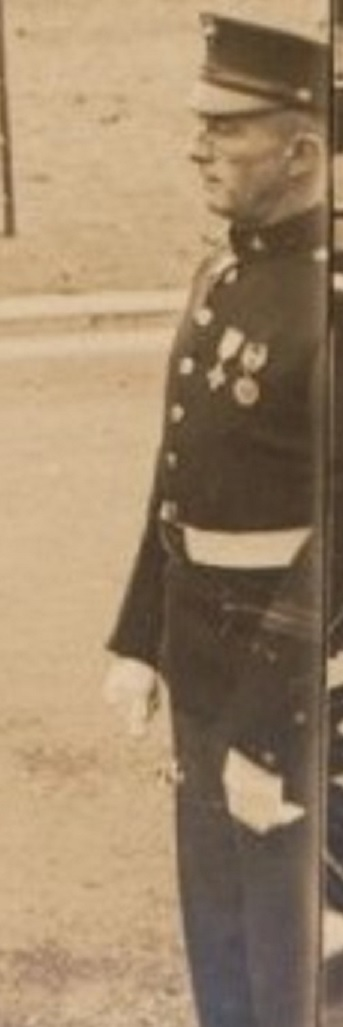
Ernest A. Janson wearing his Tiffany Cross Medal of Honor at the dedication of the Tomb of the Unknown Soldier, Washington D.C., November 11, 1921

Sergeant Major Ernest August Janson (August 17, 1878 – May 14, 1930) was a United States Marine who was highly decorated for his heroic actions in World War I. Earned both the Army and Navy Medals of Honor, he is one of only 19 double recipients. His other awards included the French Médaille militaire and Croix de Guerre as well as decorations from Italy, Montenegro and Portugal. During World War I he served under the name Charles F. Hoffman.

== Biography ==
Ernest August Janson was born on August 17, 1878, in New York City. After nearly ten years of honorable service with the U.S. Army, he enlisted in the Marine Corps on June 14, 1910, at the Marine Barracks, Bremerton, Washington. He was appointed a corporal, March 14, 1911, and took part in the Nicaraguan Campaign, and was honorably discharged on June 13, 1914.

He re-enlisted on June 17, 1914, and was appointed a sergeant on August 24, 1914. During this second enlistment, he served on the USS Nebraska from July 13, 1914, until January 30, 1915; on detached duty on the USS Montana from January 30, 1915, until February 6, 1915; on the USS Nebraska again from February 6, 1915, until October 22, 1916; and at Norfolk, Virginia, from October 22, 1916. until May 25, 1917.

== World War I action ==
Sergeant Janson sailed for France on the USS DeKalb on June 14, 1917, and disembarked at St. Nazaire, France, June 27, 1917. Appointed a gunnery sergeant, a temporary warrant for the duration of the war, on July 1, 1917, he served honorably with the 49th Company, 5th Regiment, in its various activities.

=== Medal of Honor gallantry ===
On June 6, 1918, at the Battle of Belleau Wood, he was severely wounded in action. For his conspicuous service on that date, GySgt Janson was awarded both the Army and Navy Medals of Honor. The French Médaille militaire, with the accompanying Croix de guerre with Palm, the Italian Croce al Merito di Guerra, the Montenegrin Medal for Military Bravery and the Portuguese Medalha da Cruz de Guerra Third Class were also awarded to him for the same act of bravery.

In November 1918, he returned to the United States and was admitted to the Naval Hospital, New York, for treatment of the wounds received in action on June 6, 1918.

== Post-WWI ==
At the expiration of his second enlistment, April 25, 1919, he was honorably discharged. He re-enlisted May 7, 1919, and served the full term of this enlistment as a recruiter at New York City.

Sergeant Major Janson was selected and served as the Marine Corps pallbearer for the burial of the Unknown Soldier on Armistice Day, 1921. He was honorably discharged on May 6, 1923.

His fourth-enlistment took place May 7, 1923, and he remained on recruiting duty until July 20, 1926, when he was transferred to Marine Barracks, Quantico, Virginia. On his return to duty at Quantico, he was reinstated to his wartime rank of gunnery sergeant and requested retirement the following month. He was advanced one grade to sergeant major on August 31, 1926, and placed on the retired list, September 30, 1926.

Sergeant Major Janson returned to New York and during his last years lived on Long Island. He died after a brief illness, May 14, 1930, and was buried in the Evergreen Cemetery, Brooklyn, New York.

== Medal of Honor citations ==
Gunnery Sergeant Janson was one of five Marines during World War I to earn both the Army and Navy Medals of Honor. Two Medals of Honor may no longer be earned for a single incident.

Army Medal of Honor

Rank and organization: Gunnery Sergeant, U.S. Marine Corps, 49th Company, 5th Regiment (Marines), 2nd Division, American Expeditionary Forces. Born: August 17, 1878, New York, N.Y. Accredited to: New York. (Also received Navy Medal of Honor). Action date: June 6, 1918. War Department, General Orders No. 34 (March 7, 1919)

Citation:

The President of the United States of America, in the name of Congress, takes pleasure in presenting the Medal of Honor (Army Award) to Gunnery Sergeant Charles F. Hoffman, United States Marine Corps, for extraordinary heroism while serving with the 49th Company, 5th Regiment (Marines), 2d Division, A.E.F. in action at Chateau-Thierry, France, 6 June 1918. Immediately after the company to which he belonged had reached its objective on Hill 142, several hostile counterattacks were launched against the line before the new position had been consolidated. Gunnery Sergeant Hoffman was attempting to organize a position on the north slope of the hill when he saw 12 of the enemy, armed with five light machineguns, crawling toward his group. Giving the alarm, he rushed the hostile detachment, bayoneted the two leaders, and forced the others to flee, abandoning their guns. His quick action, initiative, and courage drove the enemy from a position from which they could have swept the hill with machinegun fire and forced the withdrawal of our troops.

Navy Medal of Honor

Rank and organization: Gunnery Sergeant, U.S. Marine Corps, 49th Company, 5th Regiment (Marines), 2nd Division, American Expeditionary Forces (Served under name of Charles F. Hoffman). Born: August 17, 1878, New York, N.Y. Accredited to: New York. (Also received Army Medal of Honor).

Citation:

At CHATEAU-THIERRY, France, June 6, 1918, he displayed coolness and extraordinary heroism throughout the attack. During the counter-attack of the enemy, he, armed with a rifle, charged and routed a group of machine-gunners.

== Silver Star citation ==
Rank and organization: Gunnery Sergeant, U.S. Marine Corps, 49th Company, 5th Regiment (Marines), 2nd Division, American Expeditionary Forces. Born: August 17, 1878, New York, N.Y. Action Dates: June 6 – July 10, 1918. General Orders: Citation Orders, 2d Division, American Expeditionary Forces.

Citation:

By direction of the President, under the provisions of the act of Congress approved July 9, 1918 (Bul. No. 43, W.D. 1918), Gunnery Sergeant Charles F. Hoffman, United States Marine Corps, is cited by the Commanding General, SECOND DIVISION, American Expeditionary Forces, for gallantry in action and a silver star may be placed upon the ribbon of the Victory Medals awarded him. Gunnery Sergeant Hoffman distinguished himself while serving with the 49th Company, Fifth Regiment (Marines), 2d Division, American Expeditionary Forces at Chateau-Thierry, France, 6 June to 10 July 1918.

== Military awards ==
Janson's military decorations and awards include:

| 1st row | Medal of Honor (Army) | Medal of Honor (Navy) | Silver Star |
| 2nd row | Purple Heart | Marine Corps Good Conduct Medal | Nicaraguan Campaign Medal |
| 3rd row | World War I Victory Medal w/ one silver service star to denote credit for the Aisne, Aisne-Marne, St. Mihiel, Meuse-Argonne and Defensive Sector battle clasps. | Médaille militaire (French Republic) | Croix de Guerre 1914-1918 with bronze palm (French Republic) |
| 4th row | Croce al Merito di Guerra (Italy) | Medal for Military Bravery (Kingdom of Montenegro) | Medalha da Cruz de Guerra, Third Class (Portuguese Republic) |
| Unit Award | French Fourragère – Authorized permanent wear based on two French Croix de Guerre with Palm and one French Croix de Guerre with Gold Star unit citations awarded to 5th Marines in WWI. | | |

== See also ==
- List of Medal of Honor recipients for World War I
