= Joseph M. Baker =

Recipient of the Distinguished Service Cross

Joseph.M.Baker
- Born: February 14, 1898; Logansport, Indiana, U.S.
- Died: February 19, 1928 (aged 30); San Francisco, California, U.S.
- Military career
- Allegiance: United States of America
- Branch: United States Marine Corps; United States Army
- Service years: 1917–1919 (Marine Corps); 1919–1923 (Army)
- Rank: Private
- Units: 67th Company, 1st Battalion, 5th Marine Regiment, 2nd Division
- Conflicts: World War I: Battle of Belleau Wood; Siberian intervention
- Awards: Navy Cross; Distinguished Service Cross

Joseph M. Baker ( February 14, 1898 – February 19, 1928) served in the United States Marine Corps during World War I.

As a private in the 67th Company of 1st Battalion, 5th Marines, 2nd Division, the United States Army awarded him the Distinguished Service Cross for single-handedly destroying an enemy machinegun position while exposed to heavy fire during the Battle of Belleau Wood in France on June 6, 1918. He received the Navy Cross for the same action, where he shot the gunner with his rifle, rushed the machinegun position and bayonetted the crew. During this action, the 67th fought against the 460th Infantry Regiment equipped with Maxim guns and took heavy casualties. While attacking to seize the objective, Hill 142, Private Baker saw the hidden machinegun inflicting casualties and silenced it after maneuvering to a flanking position. Upon capturing Hill 142, the 67th established a defensive perimeter with the 47th and fought off many counterattacks.

Baker was born in Logansport, Indiana, on February 14, 1898, and enlisted in the Marine Corps in March 1917. He took part in the Third Battle of the Aisne, the Battle of Château-Thierry, the Aisne-Marne campaign, the Battle of Saint-Mihiel, and the Meuse–Argonne offensive. After being discharged from the Marines in 1919, he immediately enlisted in the United States Army and over the course of the following four years, he was sent to Siberia for the Siberian intervention and the Philippine Islands. He died 19 February 1928 and was buried in San Francisco, California.
