= Operation Swift =

1967 military operation in the Vietnam War

- Part of the Vietnam War
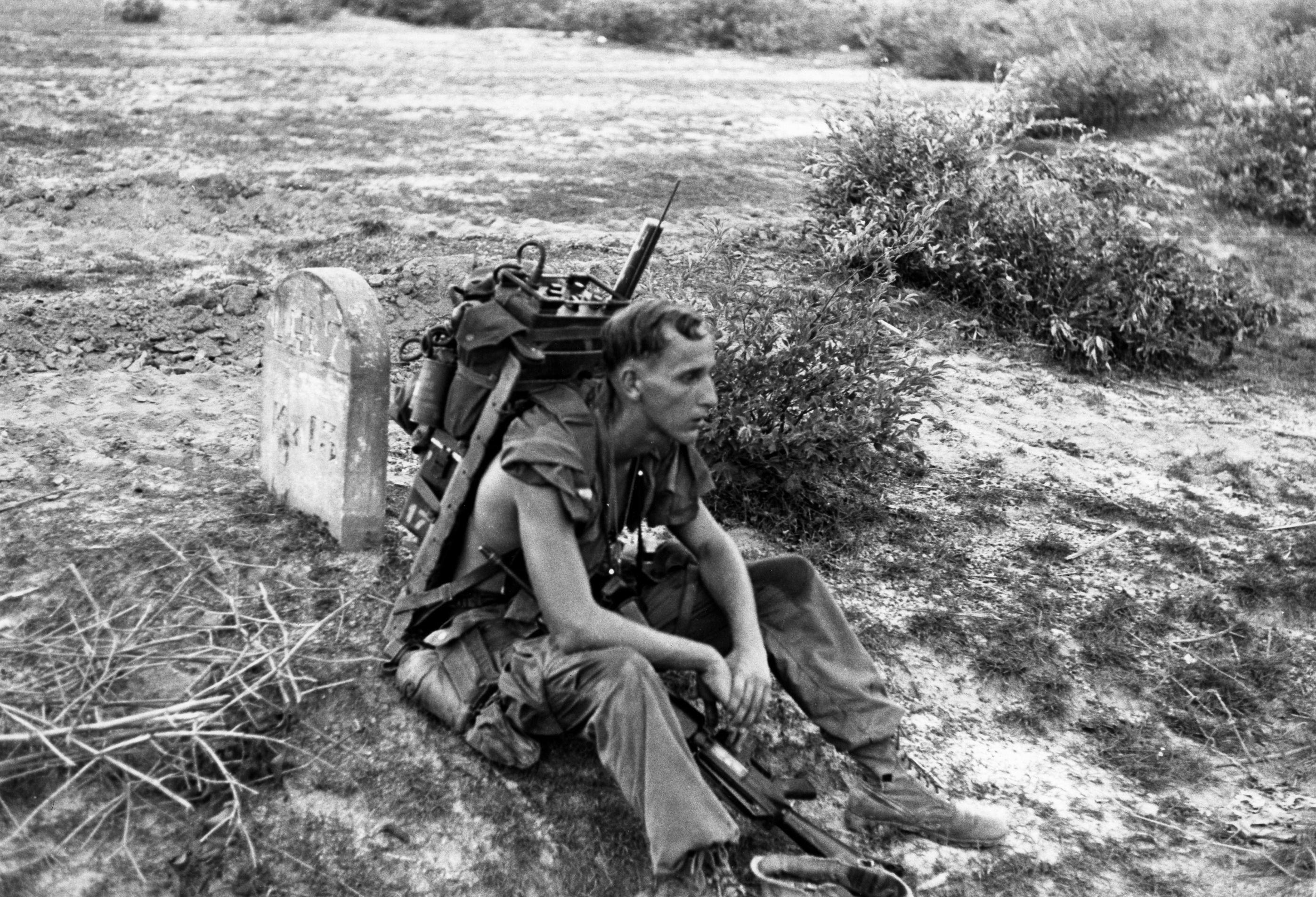
- A forward air controller attached to 1/5 Marines takes a break
Date	4–15 September, 1967
Location	Quế Sơn Valley, South Vietnam
Result	US & South Vietnamese victory

Belligerents
United States; South Vietnam	North Vietnam; Viet Cong

Commanders and leaders
Lt. Col. Peter Hilgartner	Unknown

Units involved
(United States) 1st Battalion, 5th Marines; 3rd Battalion, 5th Marines (South Vietnam) 37th Ranger Battalion	(Vietnam) 2nd Division; 1st Regiment

Strength
	U.S estimate: 2,500

Casualties and losses
(United States) 127 killed (South Vietnam) 28 killed 9 missing	U.S. estimate: ~600 killed

Operation Swift was a military operation in the Vietnam War, launched by units of the U.S. 1st Marine Division to rescue two Marine companies which had been ambushed by the People's Army of Vietnam (PAVN). The operation took place in the Quế Sơn Valley, beginning on 4 September 1967. In the ensuing battles, 127 Marines and an estimated 600 PAVN were killed.

== Background ==
The Quế Sơn Valley is located along the border of Quảng Nam and Quảng Tín Provinces. During the Vietnam War it lay in the southern part of South Vietnam's I Corps. Populous and rice-rich, the valley was viewed as one of the keys to controlling South Vietnam's five northern provinces by the PAVN and by early 1967 at least two regiments of the PAVN 2nd Division had been infiltrated into the area. The Quế Sơn Valley was also recognized as strategically important by the U.S. Military Assistance Command, Vietnam (MACV). The 5th Marine Regiment was assigned to the valley in 1967 to support the outnumbered Army of the Republic of Vietnam (ARVN) forces there.

In the spring and summer of 1967 the Marines launched Operations Union and Union II with the goal of sweeping the PAVN from the southern rim of the Quế Sơn Valley. Several bitter and costly battles forced the PAVN 2nd Division to cede control of area to the 5th Marines. Two Battalions of the 5th Marines continued to operate in the valley throughout the rest of the summer, but did not patrol aggressively and were not molested by the PAVN, who were regrouping. During the lull the PAVN 2nd Division rebuilt its strength to a force of three regular regiments and was reinforced by the Vietcong (VC) 1st Regiment, a full-time main force unit.

In early August Major General Donn J. Robertson, commanding the 1st Marine Division, turned his attention to the Quế Sơn Valley following several major operations around Da Nang. In an attempt to draw the PAVN into another destructive confrontation Robertson launched Operation Cochise on 11 August. However the PAVN largely managed to avoid contact with the three Marine battalions tasked with the operation which ended on 28 August with only modest results.

== Operation ==
Sweep operations were then initiated, reportedly to shield the local populace from intimidation during upcoming elections. Operation Swift, intended to be the fourth and the last of the 1967 operations in the Quế Sơn Valley, began unofficially on the morning of September 4 when Company D, 1st Battalion, 5th Marines was attacked before dawn by a superior PAVN force while in a night defensive perimeter next to the village of Dong Son.

The 1st Battalion Commander, Lt.Colonel Peter Hilgartner sent 1/5 Marines's Company B, which was all he had at the time, to assist Company D. With Companies B and D heavily engaged, Companies K and M from the adjacent 3rd Battalion, 5th Marines were sent to relieve them. Ambushed and aggressively attacked, these two companies were also pinned down in separate enclaves by the early afternoon. During the fighting Corporal Larry Benjamin Nunez earned the Silver Star for conspicuous gallantry and intrepidity in action while serving as a Squad Leader. Sergeant Lawrence Peters earned a posthumous Medal of Honor for leading his men in repulsing repeated attempts to overrun his position. Navy Chaplain Lieutenant Vincent R. Capodanno was also awarded a posthumous Medal of Honor for his efforts in pulling wounded men to safety in face of overwhelming enemy fire. Sergeant Thomas C. Panian was also awarded the Navy Cross for extraordinary heroism for organizing the defense of Company I, 3/5 Marines; and holding off subsequent attacks over 8 hours of combat.

Marine artillery fire and Marine jet fighter-bombers prevented the Marine infantry companies from being overrun. A Marine A-6 silenced an anti-aircraft gun emplacement, allowing more air support against PAVN positions, and a fresh Marine company launched a dawn counterattack on 5 September forcing the PAVN to break contact. With all engaged companies now relieved, Colonel Stanley Davis, commanding the 5th Marines, ordered 1/5 and 3/5 to pursue the withdrawing PAVN, this officially began Operation Swift. A search of the battlefield found 130 PAVN bodies, while Marine losses were 54 killed and 104 wounded.

In the early afternoon of 6 September, two battalions of the VC 1st Regiment attacked Company B, the lead company of the 1/5 Marines. Company B was isolated and nearly overrun, but held when Marine artillery rained tear gas around their position. Sergeant Rodney M. Davis, Platoon Guide of 2nd Platoon, Company B, purposely absorbed the force of a PAVN grenade to protect the lives of other Marines during that fight. Davis was posthumously awarded the Medal of Honor for this action. The PAVN withdrew at 02:00 leaving 61 dead, while Marine losses were 35 killed and 92 wounded.

The nearby 3/5 Marines was also heavily engaged a few hours later. Company I, dispatched to attack a hill held by the PAVN/VC, was isolated and nearly overrun by the VC 1st Regiment's previously uncommitted 3rd Battalion. Company K fought through the VC and relieved Company I, but the two companies were then found to have too many casualties to move. Two determined night assaults by the VC were repulsed, and Company M eventually fought through against weakening opposition as the VC withdrew. Vietcong losses were 88 dead, while Marine losses were 34 killed and 109 wounded.

On the morning of 7 September, after a search of VC bodies revealed a map of the VC tactical locations, the Marines swept the area, uncovering a large supply cache.

On 10 September Company H, 2/5 Marines discovered an unoccupied bunker system, when another Marine platoon moved through the same village several hours later, they were hit by intense fire from the bunker now occupied by a PAVN force. Company H, 2/5 Marines and Company M, 3/5 Marines moved to support the pinned down platoon and with air and artillery support overran the PAVN position. The bodies of 40 PAVN were discovered, Marine losses were 9 dead. Several of the dead Marines were found with their jammed M-16s broken open for cleaning.

Also on 10 September the ARVN 37th Ranger Battalion encountered a PAVN force north of the Swift operational area. The Rangers lost 13 killed and 9 missing while the PAVN lost 70 killed.

In the early morning of 12 September, two PAVN Companies attacked Company I, 3/5 Marines' night defensive position, the attack was repulsed with 35 PAVN killed and 4 captured.

On the evening of 13 September the PAVN attacked the 37th Rangers again and additional ARVN units and 1/5 and 3/5 Marines were airlifted to support them. By dawn the PAVN disengaged leaving 49 dead while the Rangers has lost 15 killed.

== Aftermath ==
The operation concluded on 15 September, by which time the PAVN 2nd Division and VC 1st Regiment had largely given up contesting the southern half of the Quế Sơn Valley. As Operation Swift concluded large U.S. Army units arrived in southern I Corps, allowing the 1st Marine Division to base a substantial force in the Quế Sơn Valley on a permanent basis. The area remained quiet from then until the Marines turned all of southern I Corps over to the U.S. Army at the beginning of 1968. U.S. intelligence agencies later determined that the two PAVN/VC regiments that had been most active during Operation Swift were subsequently unfit for combat.
