= 1st Battalion, 5th Marines =

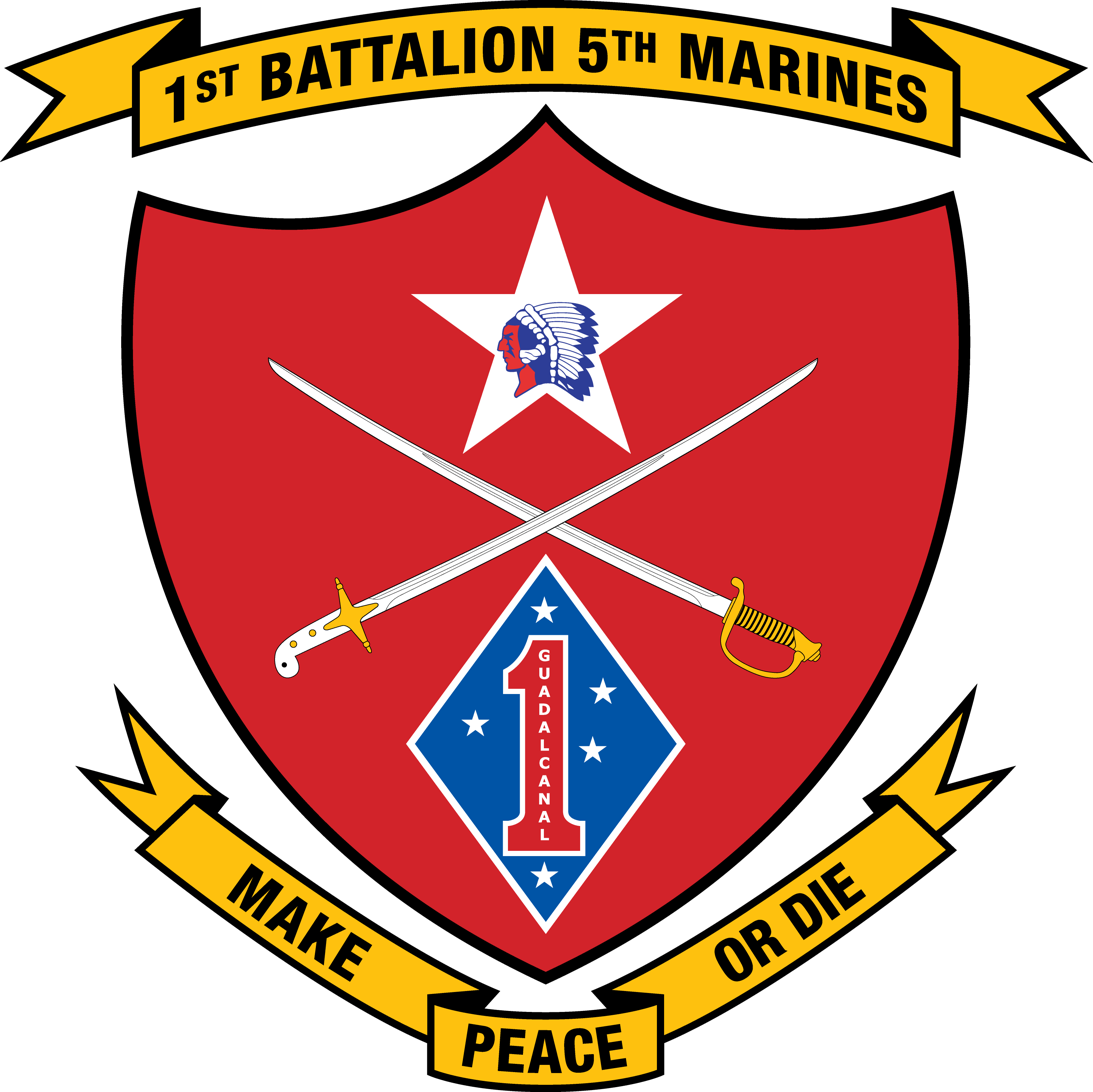
- 1st Battalion, 5th Marines insignia
- Active: 13 July 1914 – 24 December 1914; 25 May 1917 – 13 August 1919; 17 May 1921 – 2 January 1933; 1 September 1934 – 6 January 1942; 14 January 1942 – 1 October 1947; 1 October 1949 – 15 June 1974; 31 March 1975 – present
- Country: United States of America
- Branch: United States Marine Corps
- Type: Light infantry
- Role: Locate, close with and destroy the enemy by fire and maneuver
- Size: 1,200
- Part of: 5th Marine Regiment; 1st Marine Division
- Garrison/HQ: Marine Corps Base Camp Pendleton
- Nickname: "Geronimo"
- Motto: "Make peace or die"
- Engagements: World War I: Battle of Belleau Wood; Battle of Soissons; Battle of Saint-Mihiel; Battle of Blanc Mont Ridge; Meuse-Argonne Offensive; World War II: Guadalcanal Campaign; Battle of Cape Gloucester; Battle of Peleliu; Battle of Okinawa; Korean War: Battle of Pusan Perimeter; Battle of Inchon; Second Battle of Seoul; Battle of Chosin Reservoir; Battle of Hwacheon; Battle of the Punchbowl; Battle of Bunker Hill (1952); First Battle of the Hook; Battle for Outpost Vegas; Battle of the Samichon River; Vietnam War: Operation Union I & Operation Union II; Operation Swift; Battle of Hue; Operation Desert Storm; War on terror: Operation Iraqi Freedom; Operation Enduring Freedom

Commanders
- Current commander: LtCol Mark Saville
- Notable commanders: LeRoy P. Hunt; Jonas M. Platt; John H. Masters; James D. Beans Eric Smith

1st Battalion, 5th Marines (1/5) is an infantry battalion in the United States Marine Corps based out of Marine Corps Base Camp Pendleton, California consisting of approximately 800 Marines and sailors. Nicknamed Geronimo, it falls under the command of the 5th Marine Regiment and the 1st Marine Division. The battalion was formed in 1914 and has served in every major conflict that the United States has been involved in since then.

== Subordinate units ==
- Apache Company
- Blackfoot Company
- Cherokee Company
- WhiteHorse Company
- Huron Company
  - Seminole (Scout Sniper Platoon)

== History ==
On 13 July 1914, the battalion was formed at Vera Cruz, Mexico, and sailed for Guantánamo Bay, Cuba for service in the Caribbean theatre. The battalion was disbanded upon their return to Norfolk, Virginia, on 24 December 1914.

=== World War I ===
On 25 May 1917, the battalion was activated and deployed to France on 1 June 1917. 1/5 participated in the following World War I campaigns: Aisne, Aisen-Marne, St. Mihiel, Meuse-Argonne, Toulon-Troyon, Chateau-Thierry, Marabache, and Limey. 1/5 made its most notable contribution at the Battle of Belleau Wood on 6 June 1918, when it conducted the first offensive actions of the battle in seizing Hill 142. The battalion, at first with only two companies due to the other companies not being relieved in time, assaulted the open wheat fields of the hill with bayonets fixed under the fire of German machine gun and artillery fire. In a battle that claimed 325 1/5 lives, Gunnery Sergeant Ernest A. Janson became the first Marine to earn the Medal of Honor in World War I. From December 1918 to July 1919, the battalion participated in the occupation of the German Rhineland. It then re-deployed to Marine Corps Base Quantico, Virginia and de-activated in August 1919.

In July 1920 the battalion re-activated to provide security for the U.S. Mail. In March 1927, the battalion deployed to help stabilize the government of Nicaragua against overthrow attempts by rebel forces. For the next six years, they aided the Nicaraguan government until peace was finally restored. 1/5 was deactivated in January 1933. Shortly thereafter the battalion was re-activated in September 1934 in Quantico, Virginia and served in the Caribbean theatre until the outbreak of World War II.

=== World War II ===
In November 1934, the 1st Battalion was reactivated for the fourth time, only to be deactivated in March 1935. Shortly before World War II in April 1940, 1st Battalion was again reactivated. The fighting in World War II found the Marines of 1st Battalion at Guadalcanal, New Guinea, Peleliu, and Okinawa. At Peleliu, the 1st Battalion assaulted the island alongside the rest of the 1st Marine Division under Major General William H. Rupertus, fighting primarily to secure the island's airstrip and prevent interference with the Allied offensive in the Philippines. Landing at Orange Beach 1 and Orange Beach 2 on D-Day, 15 September 1944, the 1st Battalion would gain notoriety for the total destruction of an attempted Japanese tank-infantry counterattack. This costly maneuver of Japanese tanks and a company-sized infantry element would be the sole instance of open Japanese maneuver during the months-long Battle of Peleliu. In April 1946, their mission accomplished, 1st Battalion was disbanded and most of the Pacific veterans returned to civilian life.

=== Cold War ===
==== Korean War ====
During October 1949, 1st Battalion, 5th Marines was reactivated in Camp Pendleton, California. During August 1950, the battalion deployed to fight the Communist force invading the Republic of Korea. Names such as the Pusan Perimeter, Inchon, Seoul and Chosin Reservoir were added to the battalion's battle vocabulary. At the close of hostilities, the 1st Battalion returned to the United States, settling at Camp Pendleton.

==== Vietnam War ====
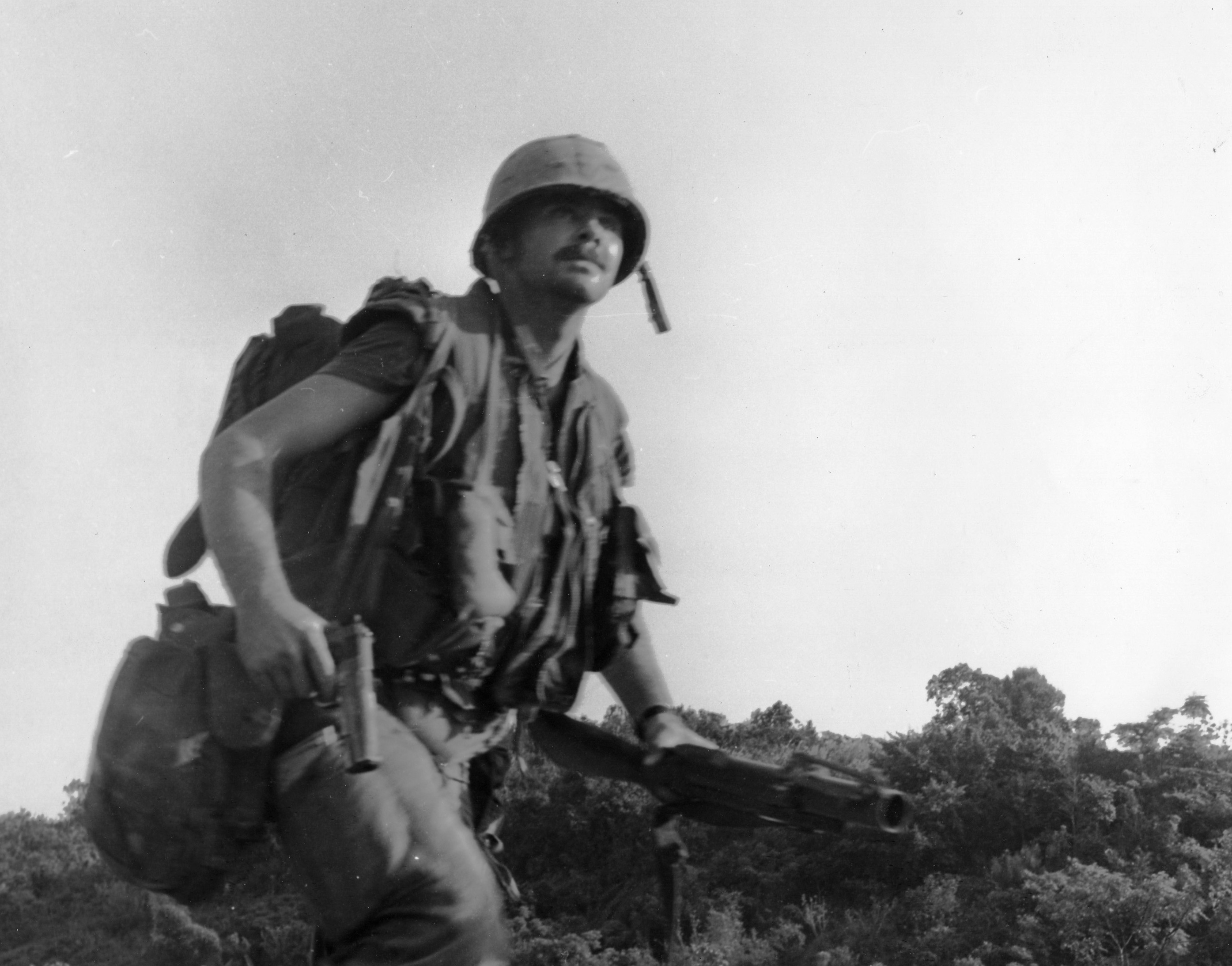
Leader of the 1st squad, 3rd Platoon, Company C, 1/5 Marines, runs under Viet Cong fire during Operation Tippecanoe, 14–16 March 1967

From June 1966 to March 1971, 1/5 was deployed to South Vietnam. The battalion participated in action around Chu Lai, Danang, Quang Nam, Que Son Valley, Hoi An, Phu Loc and An Hoa. The unit was deactivated in June 1974, but once again was quickly reactivated in March 1975. The battalion played a major role in the Battle of Hue during February 1968. Engaging the enemy in the famous Citadel on the north side of the Perfume River, the battalion became known as the "Citadel Battalion".

=== Persian Gulf War and the 1990s ===
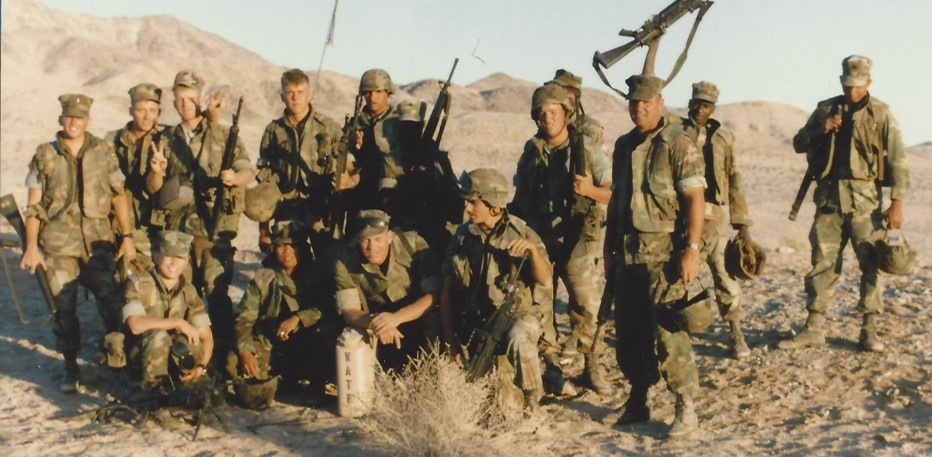
Marines from 1/5's Charlie Company at MCB Twentynine Palms in 1985

From 1987 to 1989, The battalion supported Operation Prime Chance in the Persian Gulf. In August 1990, the battalion returned to the Southwest Asia in support of Operation Desert Shield, and subsequently took part in combat operations in Kuwait during Operation Desert Storm. The battalion formed the left half of the mechanized Task Force Ripper, along with 1st Battalion 7th Marines, Alpha Company 1st Tank Battalion, Alpha Company 3rd Tank Battalion, HQ 7th Marines and Delta Company, 3rd Light Armored Infantry Battalion. They were supported by Alpha and Delta Companies of the 3rd Assault Amphibian Battalion, 1st Combat Engineer Battalion and a platoon from Charlie Company, 1st Reconnaissance Battalion. The task force was commanded by Colonel Carlton W. Fulford, Jr. and saw considerable combat as it pushed into Kuwait, seized Al Jaber Airfield and consolidated with other Marine forces at Kuwait International Airport of 27 February 1991. Following the cease fire, the task force backloaded to Manifeh Bay and departed Saudi Arabia on 8 March. The battalion returned to Camp Pendleton the following day.

=== Global war on terror ===
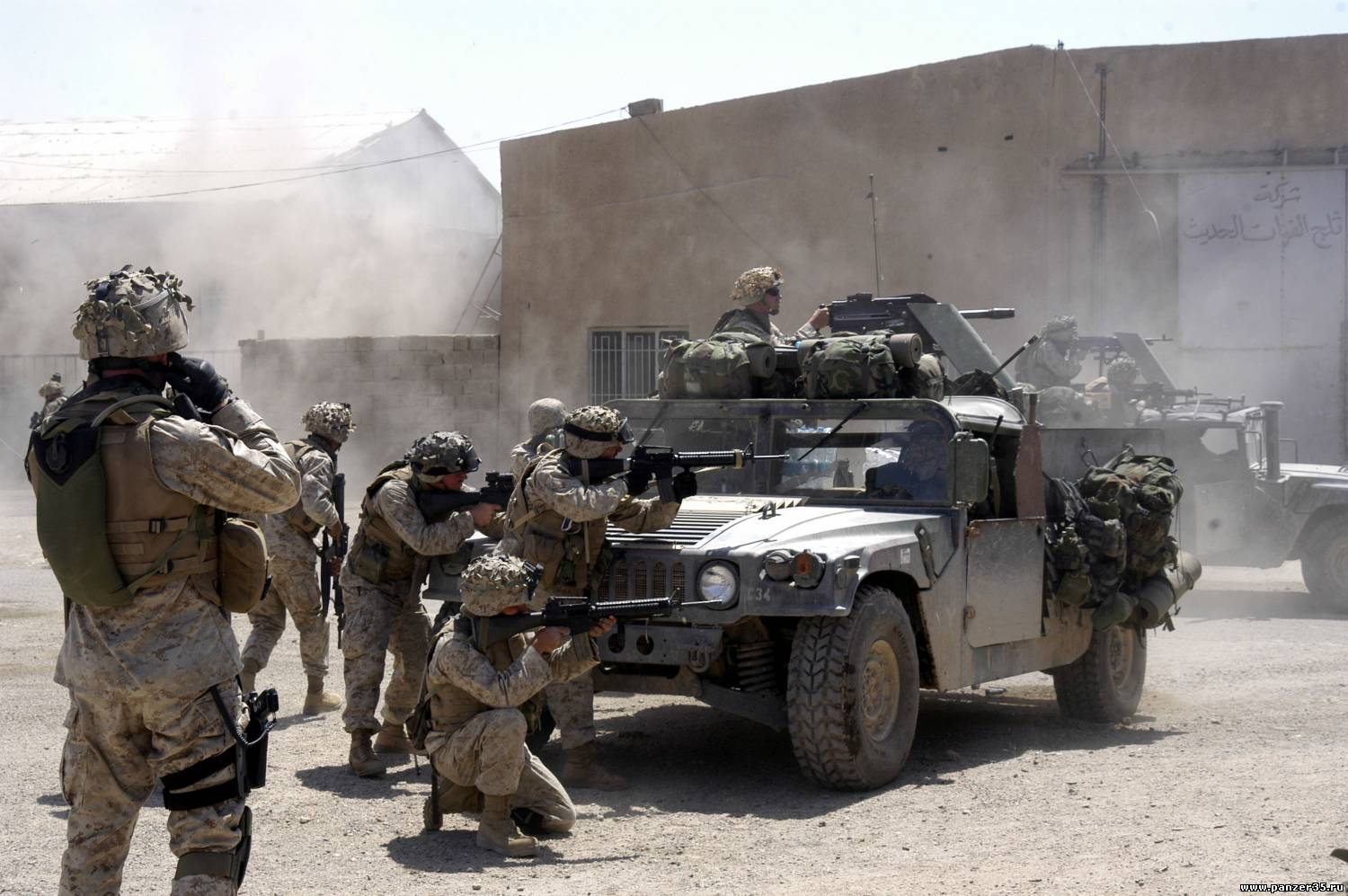
Marines from A/1/5 engage insurgents in Fallujah during Operation Vigilant Resolve on 7 April 2004.

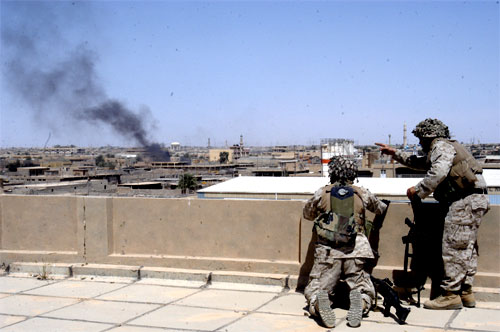
Marines with A/1/5 peer over a building top to fix enemy targets in Al Fallujah, Iraq 7 April 2004.

The battalion deployed to Kuwait in 2003 to become part of the invasion force that ousted Saddam Hussein. The Marines of 1/5 were the first to enter the country beginning combat operations the day prior to the war beginning. The battalion continued north in the coming weeks before ultimately participating in the battle for Baghdad. They returned again to Iraq as part of Operation Iraqi Freedom in early 2004 for security and stabilization operations in Al Anbar Province. In March 2004, the battalion, this time attached to the 1st Marine Regiment along with several other units, participated in Operation Vigilant Resolve in the restive city of Fallujah. They were deployed a third time in support of Operation Iraqi Freedom, one of only two Marine Corps infantry battalions to do so at the time, in the city of Ar Ramadi, capital of Al Anbar Province between March and October 2005.

1/5 deployed to Afghanistan from May to December 2009 as part of Task Force Leatherneck and conducted combat operations in the Nawa-I-Barakzayi District of Helmand province.

1/5 was once more deployed to Afghanistan from March to October 2011 in support of Operation Enduring Freedom and ISAF to the Sangin District of Helmand Province. During this time they took part in two separate combat operations. The battalion suffered 17 KIA and 191 WIA. Upon completing this rotation they were awarded with the Navy Meritorious Unit Citation award.

=== Other operations ===
In November 2012, 1/5 deployed as a Battalion Landing Team (BLT) as part of the 31st Marine Expeditionary Unit. 1/5 completed a six-month rotation including a deployment to Thailand in support of exercise Cobra Gold 2013. The battalion was relieved by fellow 5th Marines Battalion 2/4 and returned to Camp Pendleton in late May 2013, completing a six-month rotation including a deployment to the Kingdom of Thailand in support of exercise Cobra Gold 2013.

From March 2014 to October 2014, 1/5 deployed to Darwin, Australia as the ground combat element of Marine Rotational Force-Darwin. This was the third rotation of Marines to Robertson Barracks, but 1/5 was the first battalion-sized element to deploy to Australia in recent history. The battalion's presence was the first high-visibility example of the United States' "pivot to the Pacific."

In November 2015, 1/5 again formed BLT 1/5 in support of the 31st Marine Expeditionary Unit.

In July 2017, 1/5 Deployed with the 15th Marine Expeditionary Unit (15th MEU) as the MEU's Ground Combat Element (GCE) or Battalion Landing Team (BLT). The BLT was split between the USS America (LHA-6), USS San Diego (LPD-22) and USS Pearl Harbor (LSD-52) during Western Pacific 17-2 (WESTPAC 17-2). Their main mission was the supporting of Operation Inherent Resolve. During their deployment, 1/5 Marines and sailors aboard the USS America (LHA-6) came to the aid of the USS John S. McCain (DDG-56) after the USS John S. McCain and Alnic MC collision. The 15th MEU returned stateside in February 2018.

In November of 2019, 1/5 formed BLT 1/5 as the Ground Combat element of the 31st Marine Expeditionary Unit. The deployment included participation in exercise Cobra Gold in February 2020. The unit returned to Camp Pendleton in June of 2020.

In July of 2020 1/5 was deployed to the US-Mexico border in support of the United States Border Patrol. The unit redeployed to Camp Pendleton in October of 2020.

In November of 2021 1/5 once again formed BLT 1/5 in support of the 31st MEU. The unit redeployed to Camp Pendleton in May of 2022.

== Notable former members ==
- Joseph M. Baker, 67th Company, Distinguished Service Cross and Navy Cross recipient - Battle of Belleau Wood
- Lewis K. Bausell, Medal of Honor recipient
- Kenneth D. Cameron, platoon commander in the Vietnam War
- Anthony Casamento, Medal of Honor recipient - Battle of Guadalcanal, World War II 1942
- Rodney M. Davis
- Baldomero Lopez
- Walter Stauffer McIlhenny
- Lyle H. Miller
- Raymond G. Murphy, Medal of Honor Recipient - Korean War
- Jim Webb, platoon commander and company commander for D Company in the Vietnam War from January 1969 to February 1970.
- Eric M. Smith (born December 8, 1965) is a United States Marine Corps four-star general who has served as the 39th commandant of the Marine Corps since 22 September 2023. He served as acting commandant of the Marine Corps between 10 July 2023 and 22 September 2023 while awaiting Senate confirmation. Before nomination to the position he served as the 36th assistant commandant of the Marine Corps and before that as the deputy commandant for Combat Development and Integration, being succeeded by Karsten Heckl.

== See also ==
- List of United States Marine Corps battalions
- Organization of the United States Marine Corps

== Notes ==
- "1st Battalion 5th Marines' official website".
- "Lineage of 1st Battalion, 5th Marines". United States Marine Corps. Archived from the original on 22 December 2008.
- "Make Peace or Die: The First Days of War in Iraq with 1st Battalion 5th Marines" - documentary film
- "31st MEU website". United States Marine Corps. Archived from the original on 21 June 2007.
