= USS Rodney M. Davis =

US Navy frigate

Coordinates: 47.5526195°N 122.6519157°W

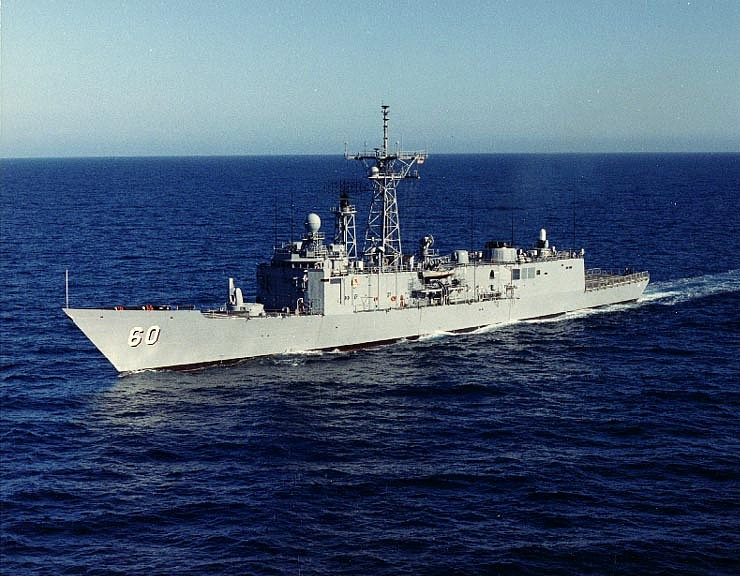
- USS Rodney M. Davis (FFG-60), at sea, 1990s.

History

United States
- Name: Rodney M. Davis
- Namesake: USMC Sergeant Rodney M. Davis
- Awarded: 28 October 1982
- Builder: Todd Pacific Shipyards, Los Angeles Division, San Pedro, California
- Laid down: 8 February 1985
- Launched: 11 January 1986
- Sponsored by: Judy P. Davis
- Commissioned: 9 May 1987
- Decommissioned: 23 January 2015
- Stricken: 31 March 2015
- Identification: Hull symbol: FFG-60; Code letters: NRMD
- Motto: "By Valor and Arms"
- Nickname(s): The RMD, "ROCKIN' RODNEY!"
- Fate: Sunk as target, 12 July 2022
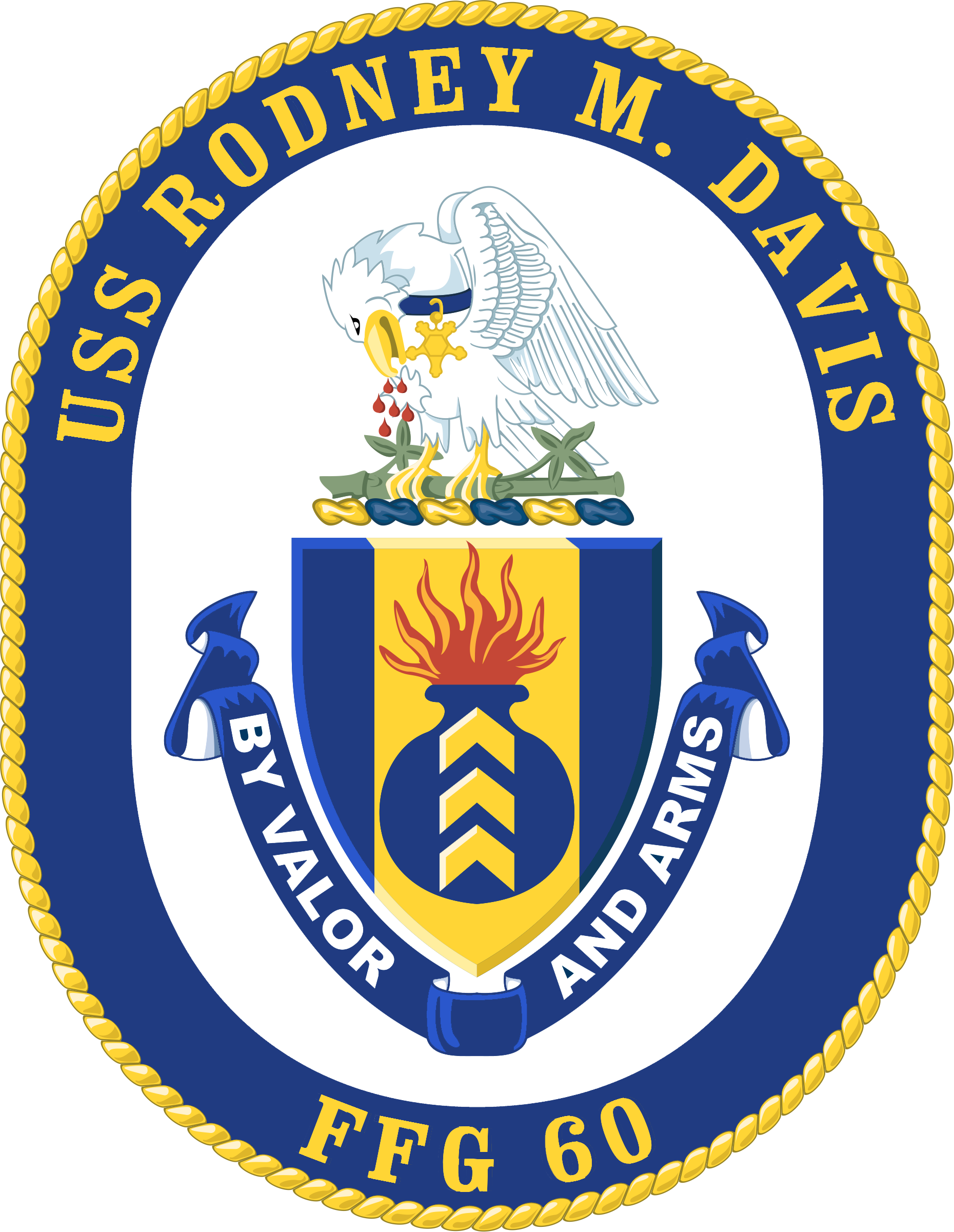
- Badge

General characteristics
- Class & type: Oliver Hazard Perry-class guided missile frigate
- Displacement: 4,100 long tons (4,200 t), full load
- Length: 453 feet (138 m), overall
- Beam: 45 feet (14 m)
- Draught: 22 feet (6.7 m)
- Propulsion: 2 × General Electric LM2500-30 gas turbines generating 41,000 shp (31 MW) through a single shaft and variable pitch propeller; 2 × Auxiliary Propulsion Units, 350 hp (260 kW) retractable electric azimuth thrusters for maneuvering and docking.
- Speed: over 29 knots (54 km/h)
- Range: 5,000 nautical miles at 18 knots (9,300 km at 33 km/h)
- Complement: 15 officers and 190 enlisted, plus SH-60 LAMPS detachment of roughly six officer pilots and 15 enlisted maintainers
- Sensors & processing systems: AN/SPS-49 air-search radar; AN/SPS-55 surface-search radar; CAS and STIR fire-control radar; AN/SQS-56 sonar.
- Electronic warfare & decoys: AN/SLQ-32
- Armament: As built: 1 × OTO Melara Mk 75 76 mm/62 caliber naval gun; 2 × Mk 32 triple-tube (324 mm) launchers for Mark 46 torpedoes; 1 × Vulcan Phalanx CIWS; 4 × .50-cal (12.7 mm) machine guns.; 1 × Mk 13 Mod 4 single-arm launcher for Harpoon anti-ship missiles and SM-1MR Standard anti-ship/air missiles (40 round magazine); Note: As of 2004, Mk 13 systems removed from all active US vessels of this class.
- Aircraft carried: 2 × SH-60 LAMPS III helicopters
- Aviation facilities: 2 × hangars; RAST helicopter hauldown system

USS Rodney M. Davis (FFG-60) was an Oliver Hazard Perry-class guided missile frigate of the United States Navy named for Marine Sergeant Rodney Maxwell Davis (1942–1967), who was posthumously awarded the Medal of Honor for his heroism in the Vietnam War.

Rodney M. Davis was laid down on 8 February 1985 by the Todd Pacific Shipyards, Los Angeles Division, San Pedro, California; Launched on 11 January 1986; Christened by Mrs. Judy P. Davis, Widow of Sgt. Davis, and commissioned on 9 May 1987.

The ship was homeported at Yokosuka, Japan for several years while assigned to Destroyer Squadron 15. Rodney M. Davis was decommissioned at NS Everett on 23 January 2015. She was sunk 12 July 2022 during RIMPAC 2022.

== History ==
On 28 April 2001 a US Coast Guard Law Enforcement Detachment (LEDET) assigned to Rodney M. Davis, with later assistance from the USCGC Active (based in Port Angeles, WA) made the largest cocaine seizure in maritime history when they boarded and seized the Belizean F/V Svesda Maru 1,500 miles (2,400 km) south of San Diego. The fishing vessel was carrying 26,931 pounds (12,216 kg) of cocaine.

In the summer of 2005, Rodney M. Davis participated in the 11th annual Cooperation Afloat Readiness and Training (CARAT) exercise. CARAT is an annual series of bilateral military training exercises designed to enhance cooperative working partnerships with several Southeast Asian nations. Ensuring freedom of the seas by increasing maritime security efforts in the region is a primary focus of the CARAT series.

In the summer of 2006, with the help of the crew from Rodney M. Davis, 11 tons of creosote logs were removed from the beaches of NAVMAG, Indian Island. The project was completed with no labor cost, due to the support of Rodney M. Davis crew on this shoreline enhancement project. Removal of creosote contaminant source from the beaches enhances shoreline habitat and marine water quality.

== 2006–2007 deployment ==
Rodney M. Davis departed Naval Station (NAVSTA) Everett for a deployment to the Southern Pacific, 28 November 2006.

On 3 March 2007, Sailors from Rodney M. Davis participated in two community relations (COMREL) projects during the ship's visit to Panama City, Panama in February. The Rodney M. Davis Sailors' COMREL efforts included visits to local orphanages and maintenance/improvements at a library in the Cinco de Mayo district of the city. Sailors spent their day cleaning, repairing, and painting chairs and cabinets at the Eusebio Morales Library. Five more Rodney M. Davis sailors visited a local orphanage, Hogar Divino Nino, to spend time with infants and toddler orphans to give them some much needed human contact. Rodney M. Davis sailors took diapers, formula, baby wipes and other child care supplies to aid the staff at the orphanage. The two groups reassembled at another orphanage, Nutre Hogar, to hand out Spanish-language Disney movies to the children, which were part of a generous donation made through the Jacksonville, Florida, area office of the United Service Organizations (USO).

Rodney M. Davis completed her transit of the Panama Canal on 25 March 2007 from the Caribbean Sea to the Pacific Ocean.

The Sailors of Rodney M. Davis completed their third community relations (COMEL) project in Panama City, Panama on 3 April 2007. During the ship's three-day port visit, 21 members of the crew spent a day helping to improve Hogar Nuevo Pacto, a home for abused children in Panama City. The crew raised $1,100 in donations to pay for supplies and improvements for the home. Rodney M. Davis sailors bought equipment to repaint the inside of the house, as well as groceries, new shower curtains, bed sheets, and light fixtures for the children's living areas. The home, previously U.S. military housing, was greatly in need of some modernization and assistance from able hands. Despite rainy weather outside, the crew spent the day productively inside, painting hallways and bedrooms, installing conveniences like toilet paper dispensers and toothbrush holders in the bathrooms, and replacing lights and correcting electrical safety problems.

On the evening of 19 April 2007, Rodney M. Davis intercepted the fishing vessel Mariana de Jesus in international waters. The 33-foot vessel was overcrowded with 31 migrants. Rodney M. Davis gave the migrants food and water and they were all examined by the ship's medical personnel. Some were treated for mild dehydration and headaches, but overall they were found to be in good physical condition. The migrants were then transferred to the El Salvadoran Navy.

On 23 April 2007, the Costa Rican Coast Guard vessel Juan Rafael Mora and Rodney M. Davis intercepted the fishing vessel Kuerubin with 61 Chinese migrants, all of whom were transferred to Juan Rafael Mora. Rodney M. Davis was tasked to ensure their health and safety was maintained by providing food, water, and medical supplies. All were malnourished and dehydrated for they had been without food or water for four days.

The frigate returned to Everett naval base on 12 June 2007 after a six-month deployment in the war on drugs.

The first maritime seizure of liquid cocaine occurred 25 April when the Rodney M. Davis located the fishing vessel Emperador from Ecuador in the Eastern Pacific. A Coast Guard Law Enforcement Detachment (LEDET) boarded Emperador and located 3,850 gallons of liquid cocaine. Each gallon of the liquid is the equivalent of 1.3 kilograms of processed cocaine. The Coast Guard boarding team detained the 17 crewmembers of the vessel. Sixteen of the crewmembers were from Ecuador, and one of the crewmembers was Colombian. The Coast Guard boarding team and crew of Rodney M. Davis transported the vessel to Guayaquil, Ecuador, for further examination by officials from the Drug Enforcement Administration and Ecuadorian authorities. The majority of the liquid cocaine, 3,600 gallons, was turned over to Ecuadorian authorities for destruction. Rodney M. Davis was again underway in late spring 2008. In the course of conducting workups for a fall deployment, Rodney M. Davis was ordered to participate in RIMPAC 2008 off Hawaii. While docked in Pearl Harbor prior to the exercise, an unusual helicopter detachment embarked Rodney M. Davis. For the first time in 10 years, Kitty Hawk was in Hawaii. She had been the Navy's only forward deployed aircraft carrier until that spring, and she was on her way to San Diego to crossdeck Carrier Air Wing Five to George Washington prior to her decommissioning. Onboard Kitty Hawk was a detachment from HS-14 out of NAF Atsugi, Japan. The detachment went underway with RMD for the entire exercise, providing a force multiplying ASW capability to a ship that was soon surrounded by "enemy" submarines during the exercise. The RMD/HS-14 Team performed very well, easily allowing her to claim the title of "most deadly" ASW ship in the exercise task group.

== 2008–2009 deployment ==
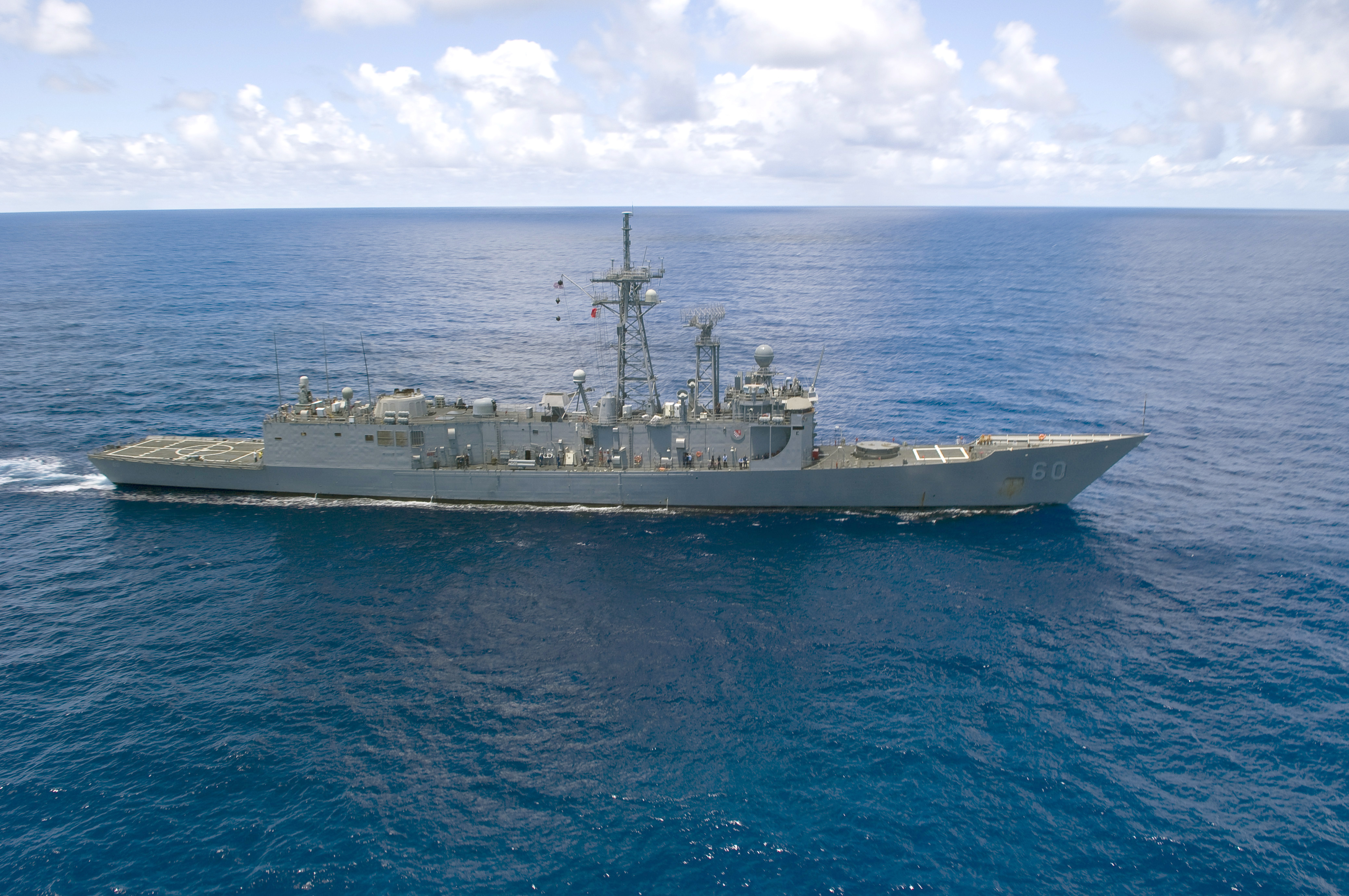
USS Rodney M. Davis after the removal of her foredeck Mk 13 missile launcher, 13 July 2008.

While on patrol in the Eastern Pacific Ocean, units assigned to the U.S. Navy's 4th Fleet and the U.S. Coast Guard intercepted a fishing vessel carrying more than 4 metric tons of cocaine, 5 December. The combined team of Rodney M. Davis (FFG 60), with embarked Helicopter Anti-Submarine Squadron Light (HSL-43) Det. 2, and U.S. Coast Guard Law Enforcement Detachment (LEDET) 106 intercepted the fishing vessel in an early morning interdiction, capturing nine suspected narcotics smugglers and the large cargo of cocaine with an estimated import value of $90 million. A search of the vessel revealed the large amount of cocaine. The narcotics were seized under the authority the Coast Guard LEDET. The coordinated actions of the U.S. Navy, U.S. Coast Guard and Joint Interagency Task Force South were instrumental to the successful interdiction of narcotics.

Rodney M. Davis, homeported in Everett, Washington, returned from its 6-month CNT deployment on 21 April 2009 during which it was operating in Latin America under the operational control of U.S. Naval Forces Southern Command (NAVSO) and U.S. 4th Fleet, conducting counter illicit trafficking operations in support of JIATF-South, U.S. law enforcement and U.S. and participating nations' drug control policy.

Rodney M. Davis also supported the U.S. Maritime Strategy by conducting theater security cooperation (TSC) events in the Caribbean and Latin America. TSC encompasses a robust strategy that includes military-to-military exchanges, multi-national exercises and training, diplomatic port visits, community relations activities and Project Handclasp distributions.

== 2010 deployment ==
On 23 September 2010 while operating as part of the 4th Fleet, Rodney M. Davis captured a 46-foot fishing vessel that flew Ecuadorian colors. Aboard the Ecuadorian vessel the Rodney M. Davis's US Coast Guard Law enforcement detachment seized 1,562.5 kilos of cocaine in 62.5 bails.

== 2014 deployment ==
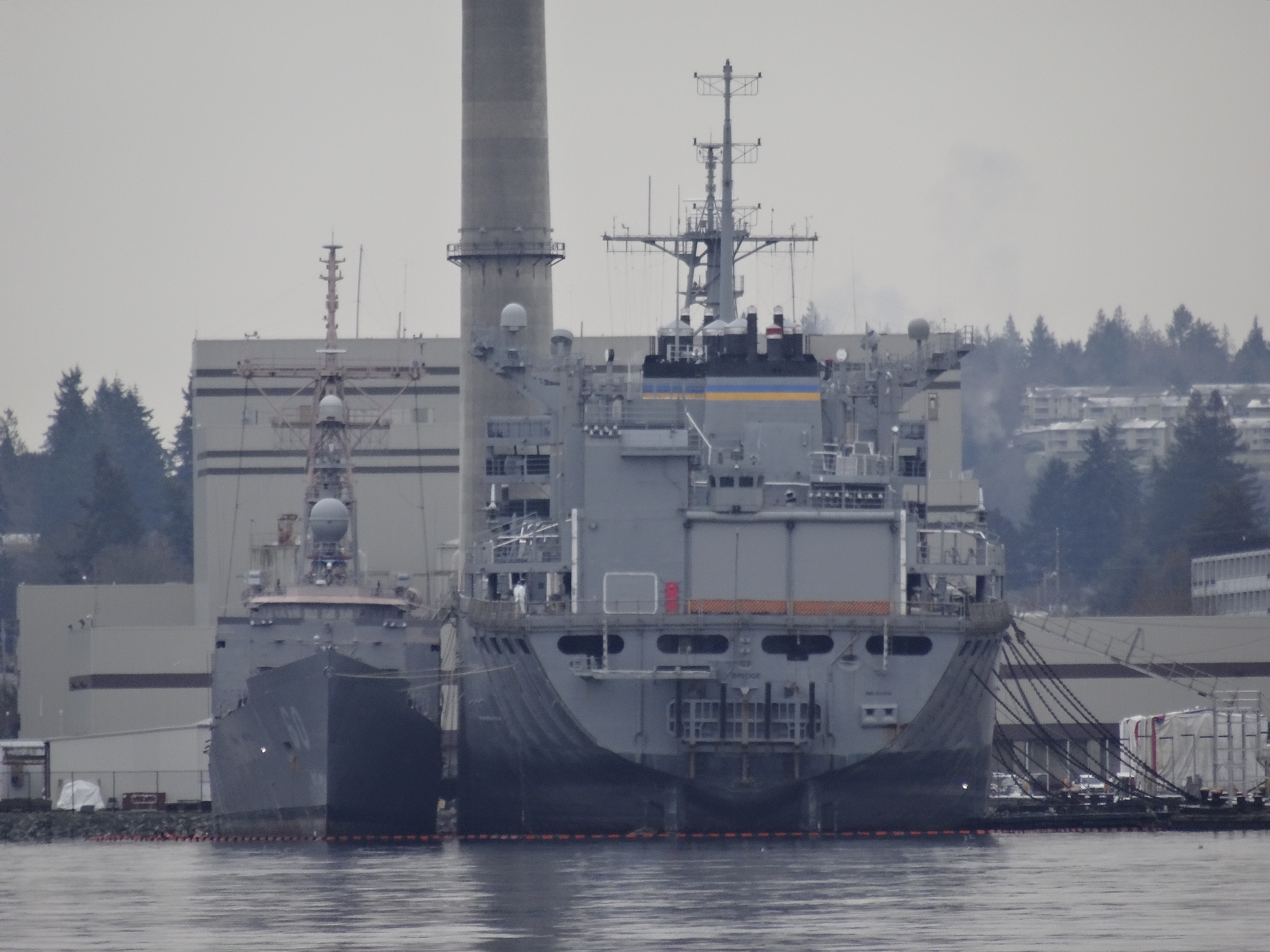
USS Rodney M. Davis (FFG-60) awaits her fate PSNS InacShips 2.2017

The ship left Everett 12 June to join 48 ships from 22 countries for Rim of the Pacific (RIMPAC) 2014. Following RIMPAC, a U.S. Coast Guard Law Enforcement Team embarked the ship and performed compliant boarding operations and visit, board, search and seizures training with Sailors on board.

Subsequently, the ship conducted extensive theater security cooperation in the United States Seventh Fleet area of responsibility. A detachment from HSM-51 embarked with the crew to provide reconnaissance and aerial support for the ship's 7th Fleet operations.

The ship visited ports including Yokosuka, Japan; Sembawang, Singapore; the Republic of the Maldives; Indonesia and Brunei. As the first U.S. Navy vessel to visit the Republic of the Maldives in four years, Rodney M. Davis hosted the Maldives National Defense Force Chief of Defense, conducted boarding exercises with the Maldivian Coast Guard, and performed community service at a local orphanage.

During the ship's visit to Medan, Indonesia, the ship hosted Ray Mabus, the Secretary of the Navy, and Rodney M. Davis's sailors took part in cultural exchanges with more than 800 students at Medan universities and high schools.

While in Brunei, the ship conducted training events with the Royal Brunei Armed Forces as a part of Cooperation Afloat Readiness and Training (CARAT) 2014. Activities included training symposia and shipboard damage control training ashore, and cross-deck landings, medical evacuation drills and maneuvering exercises at sea. Visit, board, search and seizure teams from Rodney M. Davis and the Royal Brunei Navy Darussalam class offshore patrol vessel KDB Darulaman (P-08) conducted compliant boarding exercises with their partner nation's ship.

During the six-month deployment, the ship and crew of more than 200 sailors, based at Naval Station Everett and assigned to Destroyer Squadron (DESRON) 9, conducted presence operations and theater security cooperation with partner nations in the Indo-Asia-Pacific region. In total, the ship and its crew transited more than 37,000 nautical miles, conducted 13 underway replenishment and performed nearly 300 hours of flight operations at sea.

== Decommissioning and disposal as target ==
Rodney M. Davis was decommissioned on 23 January 2015 at Naval Station Everett and was scheduled to be transferred for dismantlement on 31 March.

The documentary titled The Last Frigate follows the crew during the deployment and decommissioning of the ship.

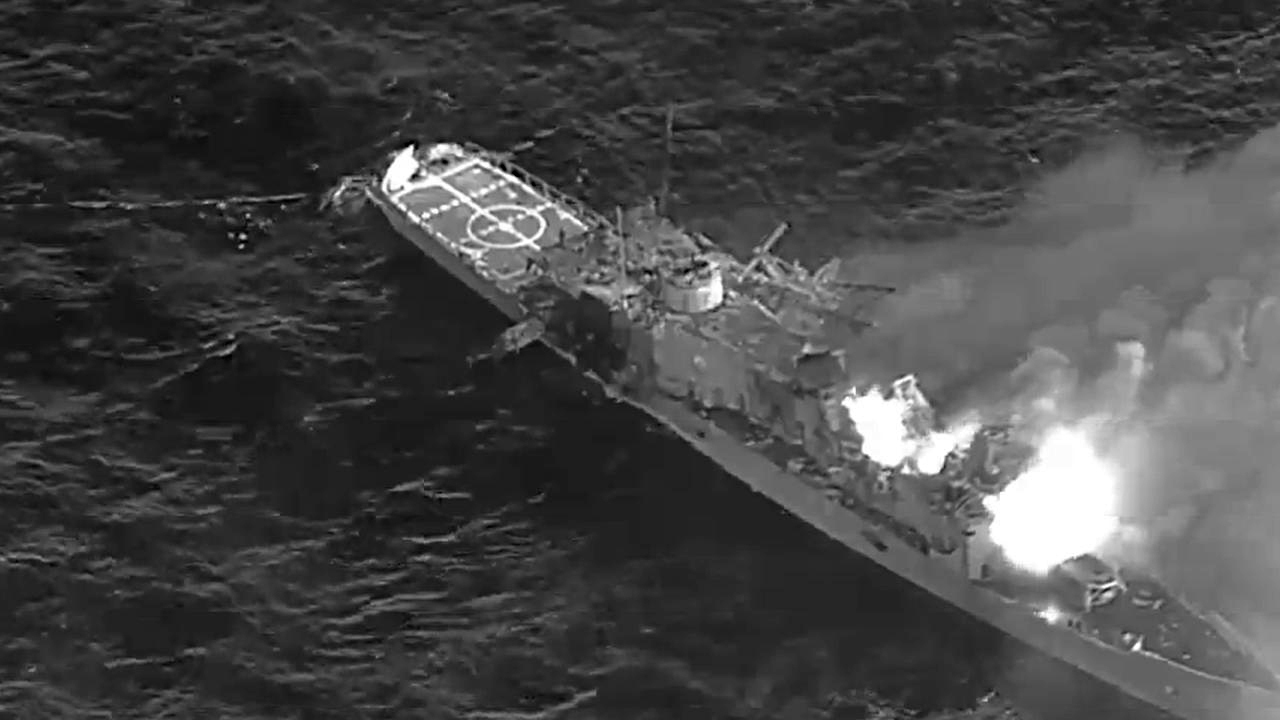
USS Rodney M. Davis on fire during SINKEX at RIMPAC 2022.

On 12 July 2022, the frigate was sunk as a target ship by Australian, Canadian, Malaysian, and American ship and aircraft forces during the RIMPAC 2022 exercise.
