= Tyler Steen =

American football player (born 2000)

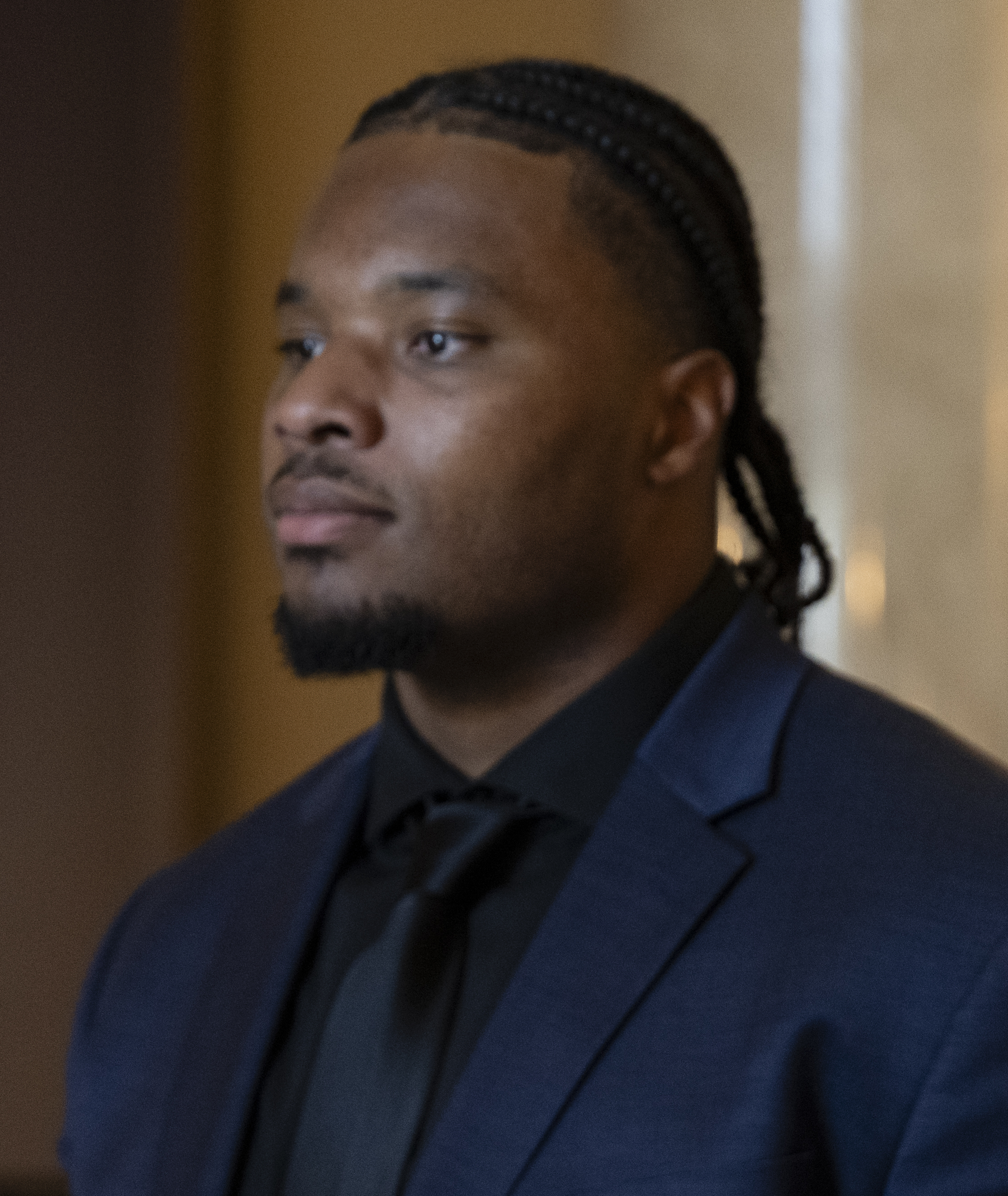
- Steen in 2025

No. 56 – Philadelphia Eagles
- Position: Guard
- Roster status: Active

Personal information
- Born: June 24, 2000 (age 26); Miami, Florida, U.S.
- Listed height: 6 ft 6 in (1.98 m)
- Listed weight: 321 lb (146 kg)

Career information
- High school: St. Thomas Aquinas (Fort Lauderdale, Florida)
- College: Vanderbilt (2018–2021); Alabama (2022)
- NFL draft: 2023: 3rd round, 65th overall pick

Career history
- Philadelphia Eagles (2023–present)

Awards and highlights
- Super Bowl champion (LIX); Second-team All-SEC (2022)

Career NFL statistics as of 2025
- Games played: 45
- Games started: 20
- Stats at Pro Football Reference

Tyler Maxwell Steen (born June 24, 2000) is an American professional football guard for the Philadelphia Eagles of the National Football League (NFL). He played college football for the Vanderbilt Commodores before transferring to the Alabama Crimson Tide in 2022.

== Early life ==
Steen was born on June 24, 2000, in Miami, Florida. He is the oldest of three sons to Samantha Steen, Esq, an attorney, and Daris Steen, a retired member of the U.S. Marine Corps. Steen attended St. Thomas Aquinas High School in Fort Lauderdale He played both offense and defense on the St. Thomas Aquinas High School football team. Steen was also a member of the track and field team.

== College career ==
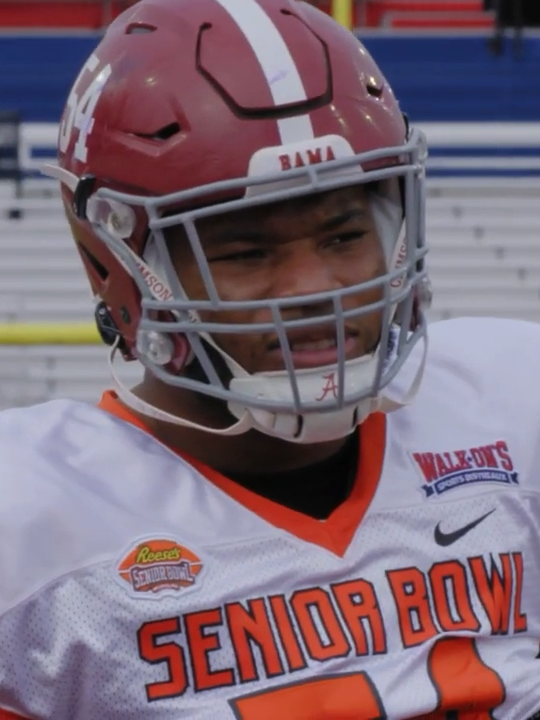
Steen at the 2023 Senior Bowl

=== Vanderbilt ===
Steen enrolled at Vanderbilt University in 2018, playing four games at defensive end as a freshman for their football team, recording one tackle. He moved to right tackle as a sophomore in 2019 before moving to left tackle as a junior. Steen started thirty-four of thirty-eight games played at Vanderbilt, receiving All-Southeastern Conference (SEC) honors twice.

=== Alabama ===
In 2022, Steen was a graduate transfer to the University of Alabama to play his final season of eligibility for the Crimson Tide. He started all thirteen regular season games for Alabama. Steen would be named second-team All-SEC and started in the 2023 Senior Bowl.

== Professional career ==
Pre-draft measurables
Height	Weight	Arm length	Hand span	Wingspan	20-yard shuttle	Three-cone drill	Vertical jump	Broad jump	Bench press
6 ft 6 in (1.98 m)	321 lb (146 kg)	32 3/4 in (0.83 m)	10 1/2 in (0.27 m)	6 ft 8 1/2 in (2.04 m)	4.50 s	7.78 s	29.5 in (0.75 m)	9 ft 1 in (2.77 m)	31 reps
All values from NFL Combine/Pro Day

Steen was selected by the Philadelphia Eagles in the third round, 65th overall, of the 2023 NFL draft. On November 5, 2023, Steen got his first professional start against the Dallas Cowboys. As a rookie, he appeared in 11 games and started one in the 2023 season.

In the 2024 season, Steen won a Super Bowl championship when the Eagles defeated the Kansas City Chiefs 40–22 in Super Bowl LIX.

== Personal life ==
Steen has three younger brothers, Blake (2004), Dylan Steen (2008), and Ayden (2010). Blake is a member of the University of Virginia football team. Steen's grandfather, Sergeant Rodney Maxwell Davis, was a non-commissioned officer in the United States Marine Corps who was posthumously awarded the Medal of Honor for heroism above and beyond the call of duty in 1967, during the Vietnam War.
