= 5th Marine Regiment =

5th Marine Regiment/"5th Marines"
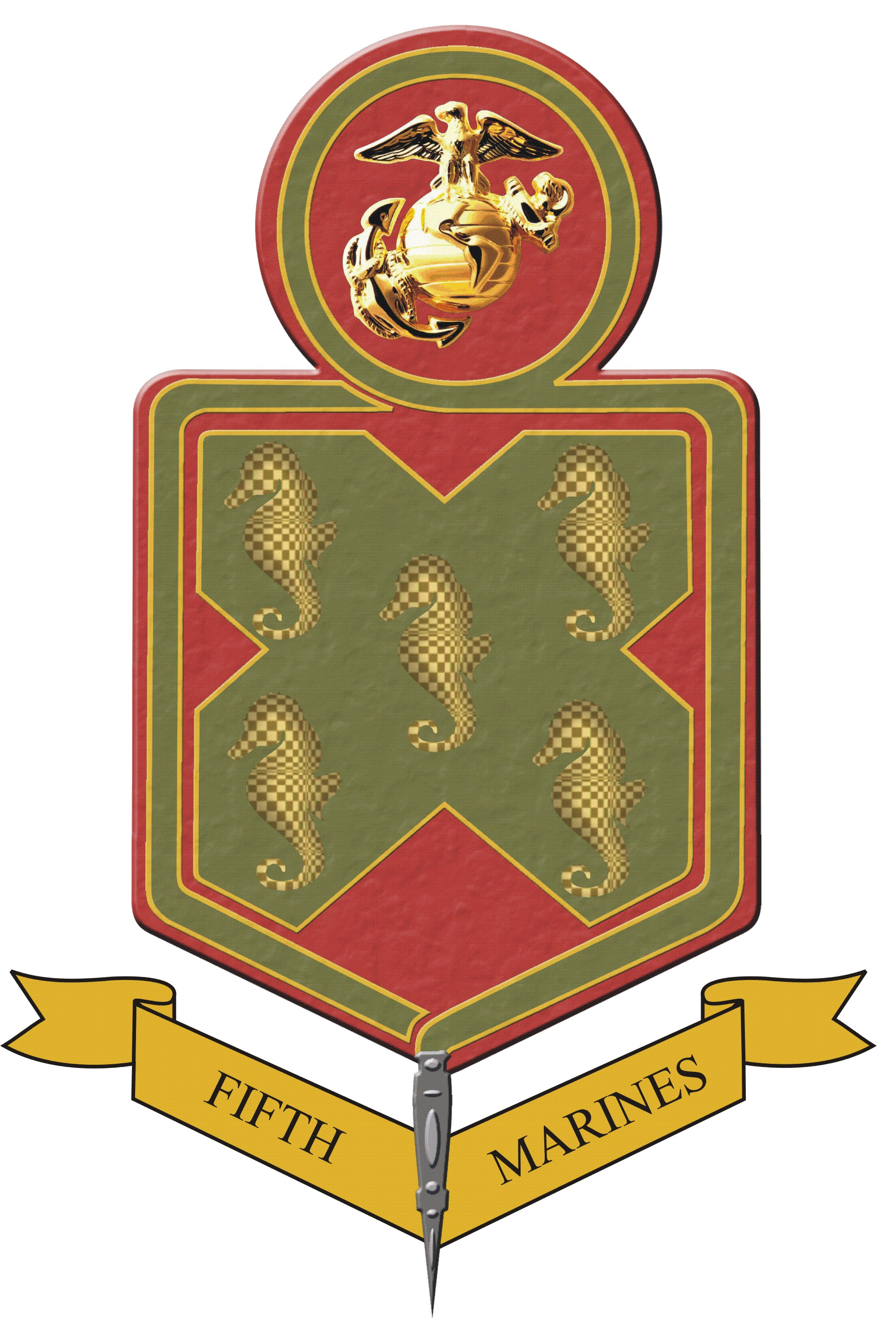
- 5th Marine Regiment insignia
- Active: 1917–1919; 1920–1930; 1934–present
- Country: United States
- Branch: United States Marine Corps
- Type: Light infantry
- Size: 4,800 men
- Part of: 1st Marine Division; I Marine Expeditionary Force
- Garrison/HQ: MCB Camp Pendleton
- Nickname: "The Fighting Fifth"
- Engagements: World War I; Battle of Belleau Wood; Battle of Soissons; Battle of Saint-Mihiel; Battle of Blanc Mont Ridge; Meuse-Argonne Offensive; Banana Wars; Occupation of Nicaragua; World War II; Guadalcanal Campaign; Battle of Cape Gloucester; Mariana and Palau Islands campaign; Battle of Peleliu; Volcano and Ryukyu Islands campaign; Battle of Okinawa; Korean War; Battle of Pusan Perimeter; Battle of Inchon; Battle of Chosin Reservoir; Battle of Hwacheon; Battle of the Punchbowl; Battle of Bunker Hill (1952); First Battle of the Hook; Battle for Outpost Vegas; Battle of the Samichon River; Vietnam War; Operation Swift; Operation Union I & II; Battle of Hue; Operation Desert Storm; Operation Restore Hope; Global War on Terrorism; Iraq War; War in Afghanistan; Operation Inherent Resolve

Commanders
- Commander: Col George J. Flynn III
- Notable commanders: Charles A. Doyen; Hiram I. Bearss; Wendell Neville; Logan Feland; Samuel Harrington; Julian C. Smith; Charles Barrett; Alfred H. Noble; LeRoy P. Hunt; Merritt A. Edson; Oliver P. Smith; John H. Griebel; Victor H. Krulak; John T. Selden; Harold D. Harris; Lewis W. Walt; Fred E. Haynes Jr. Martin Brandtner; Lawrence D. Nicholson; Thomas V. Draude; Kenneth R. Kassner; Christopher T. Steele

The 5th Marine Regiment (also referred to as "5th Marines") is an infantry regiment of the United States Marine Corps based at Marine Corps Base Camp Pendleton, California. It is the most highly decorated regiment in the Marine Corps and falls under the command of the 1st Marine Division and the I Marine Expeditionary Force (I MEF).

== Organization ==
The Regiment comprises four infantry battalions and one headquarters company:

- Headquarters Company 5th Marines (HQ/5th Marines)
- 1st Battalion, 5th Marines (1/5)
- 2nd Battalion, 5th Marines (2/5)
- 3rd Battalion, 5th Marines (3/5)
- 2nd Battalion, 4th Marines (2/4) – (assigned to the 5th Marine Regiment)

== History ==
=== World War I ===
The unit was activated on 8 June 1917, in Philadelphia, Pennsylvania, as the 5th Regiment of Marines. They immediately deployed to France, arriving on 26 June, and were assigned to the 1st Infantry Division of the United States Army. Later that year, in October, they were reassigned to 4th Brigade of Marines under the 2nd Infantry Division.

In spring 1918, the regiment, commanded by Colonel Wendell C. Neville, a Medal of Honor recipient, was involved in the fierce battle of Belleau Wood. While it is often claimed that this is where the Marine Corps famous nickname the Devil Dogs, from the German, “Teufel Hunden"—"Devil Dogs" in English—was bestowed upon the Marines by German soldiers at the Battle of Belleau Wood in June 1918. However, on April 14, 1918, six weeks before that battle began, hundreds of U.S. newspapers ran stories using the phrase. However the Nickname remains one of the most popular and mythologized among the Marine Corps

The Fifth subsequently participated in the offensive campaigns at Aisne, Battle of Saint-Mihiel and in the Meuse-Argonne offensive. They also participated in the defensive campaigns at Toulon-Troyon, Château-Thierry, Marbache and Limey. From 1918 until 1919 the regiment participated in the occupation of the German Rhineland. In August 1919 it relocated back to Marine Corps Base Quantico, Virginia. It was inactivated on 13 August 1919.

The regiment's actions in France earned them the right to wear the Fourragère (seen in the outline of the unit's logo), one of only two in the Marine Corps (the other being the 6th Marine Regiment). The award was a result of being the only regiments in the American Expeditionary Force to receive three Croix de Guerre citations: two in the order of the army and one in the order of the corps—Fourragère and Croix de Guerre with two Palms and Gilt Star. The Fourragère became part of the uniform of the unit, and all members of the organization are authorized to wear the decoration on the left shoulder of the uniform while members of the organization.

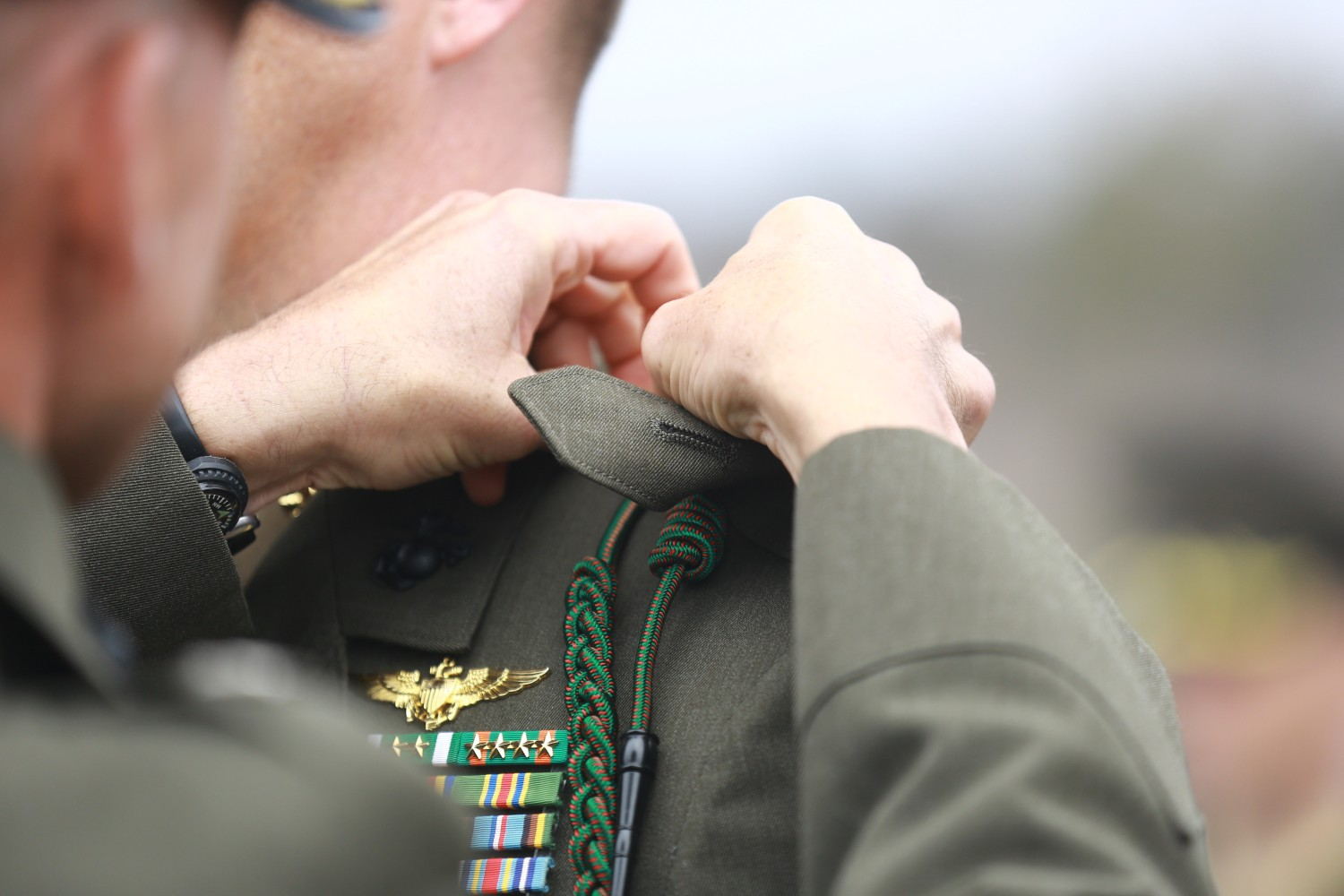
5th Marines is one of two USMC regiments authorized to wear the French Fourragère for actions during World War I.

Three Marines of the regiment were awarded the Medal of Honor for their actions during the war. Sergeant Louis Cukela, Gunnery Sergeant Ernest A. Janson, and Sergeant Matej Kocak each received two Medals of Honor (one from the Navy and one from the Army) for a single action, making them three of only nineteen double recipients of the medal. In addition, two U.S. Navy officers attached the 5th Marines received the Medal of Honor: Lieutenant Commander Alexander Gordon Lyle of the Navy Dental Corps and Lieutenant Orlando H. Petty of the Medical Corps.

=== Inter-war years ===
Unit was reactivated on 8 July 1920. Elements of the regiment participated in mail guard duty in the eastern United States from November 1921 through May 1922 and once again from October 1926 through February 1927.

They then deployed to Nicaragua from January 1927. They continuously fought Nicaraguan rebels until they were again inactivated on 11 April 1930.

5th Marines was reactivated for the last time on 1 September 1934, at Quantico, Virginia and were assigned to the 1st Marine Brigade. In 1940 they were deployed to Guantánamo Bay, Cuba and reassigned to the 1st Marine Division in February 1941. They were garrisoned at New River, North Carolina.

=== World War II ===
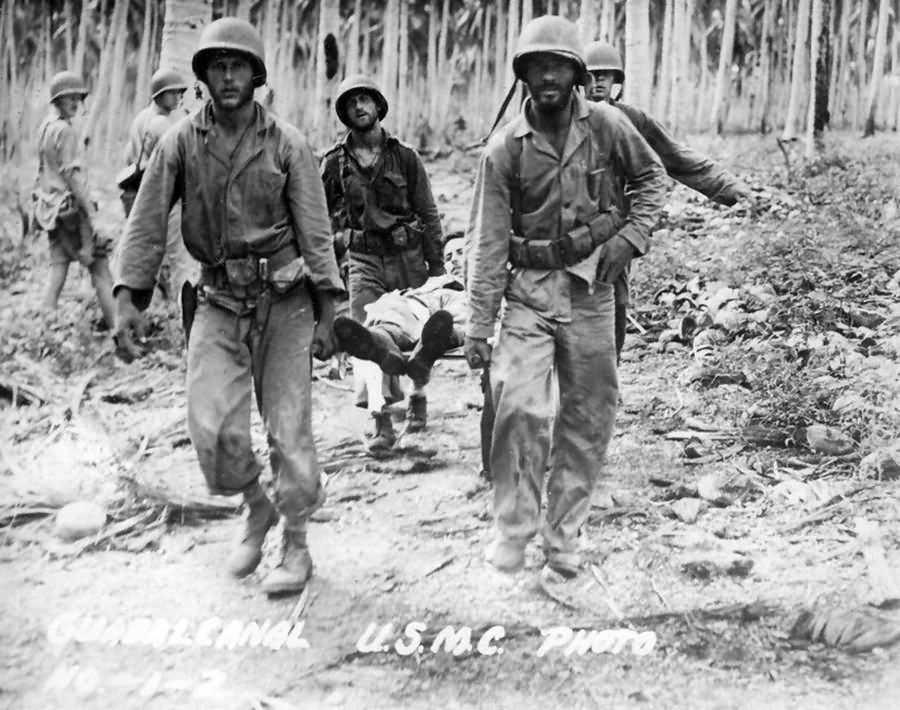
5th Marine Regiment wounded are carried back from the front line during the November 1942 U.S. offensive against Japanese forces around the Matanikau River

After the outbreak of war, the 5th Marines deployed to Wellington, New Zealand in June 1942. During World War II they fought on Guadalcanal, New Britain, Eastern New Guinea, Peleliu and Okinawa. Immediately following the war in September 1945 they deployed to Tianjin, China and participated in the occupation of North China until May 1947. They were redeployed to Guam in May 1947 and reassigned to the 1st Provisional Marine Brigade. In 1949 they were relocated to Marine Corps Base Camp Pendleton.

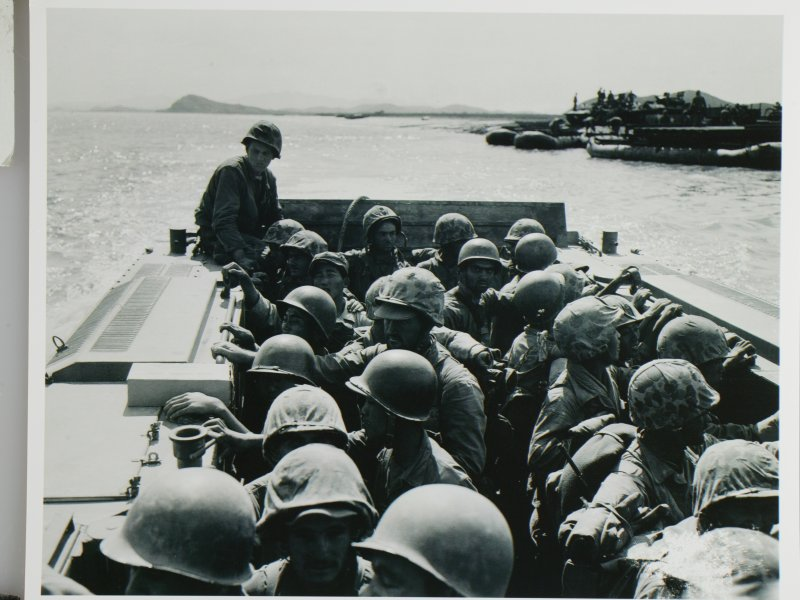
During the allied advance into Seoul, American and South Korean marines crossed the Han River in an LVT-3c of the Marines' 1st Amphibian Tractor Battalion.

=== Korean War and early 1950s ===
On 5 August 1950, 5th Marines were deployed to the Pusan Perimeter as part of the 1st Provisional Marine Brigade. From there, they participated in the Inchon Landing, Battle of Chosin Reservoir and fighting on the East-Central Front and Western Front until the end of hostilities. Immediately after the war, they participated in the defense of the Korean Demilitarized Zone from July 1953 until February 1955. The regiment returned to Camp Pendleton in March 1955.

=== Vietnam War ===
On 5 March 1966, 5th Marines deployed to the Republic of Vietnam. They remained in Vietnam for the next five years, fighting at Rung Sat, Chu Lai, Hue, Phu Loc, Que Son Valley, An Hoa, Tam Kỳ and Da Nang. The 5th Marines finally left Vietnam in April 1971. In 2003, former 5th Marine sniper–turned–Vietnam War author, John J. Culbertson, documented in 13 Cent Killers: The 5th Marine Snipers in Vietnam, the stories of 5th Marine Regiment marksmen who, as the publisher describes, "fought with bolt rifles and bounties on their heads during the fiercest combat of the war, from 1967 through the Tet battle for Hue in early 1968."

=== Post-war years through 1990s ===
Elements of the regiments participated in Operation New Arrivals, the relocation of Vietnamese refugees to Camp Pendleton, California, from July through December 1975. Their next major action was Operation Desert Shield and Operation Desert Storm from August 1990 through April 1991. Combat operations in Southwest Asia were quickly followed by Operation Sea Angel in Bangladesh in May–June 1991.December 1992 BLT 2/9 assigned to the 15TH MEU(SOC) landed in Somalia and conducted combat operations.

=== Global war on terrorism ===
On 5 February 2003, 5th Marines deployed to Kuwait with its 1st, 2nd, and 3rd Battalions (1/5, 2/5, 3/5) as part of the force that would be part of the invasion of Iraq. They were supported by elements of the 1st Light Armored Reconnaissance Battalion, 2nd Tank Battalion, various firing batteries of the 11th Marines, 2nd and 3rd Assault Amphibian Battalions, Company B from the 1st Combat Engineer Battalion, and Combat Service Support Company 115 (CSSC–115). These attachments brought regimental strength up to more than 6,000 personnel on any given day. This was the largest the regiment had been in its history.

On 21 March, the regiment became the first unit to cross into Iraq as it moved to seize the Rumayllah oil fields. For the drive north, RCT-5 advanced up a four-lane highway before swinging east toward the Tigris River until the 1st Marine Division reunited to push into the red zone that encompassed Baghdad and its suburbs. After all objectives had been secured, the Marines occupied assigned security sectors and conducted follow-on combat operations. During much of the attack north, the regiment led the 1st Marine Division in the deepest attack in Marine Corps history. The regiment suffered 12 killed and 126 seriously wounded in 33 days of combat.

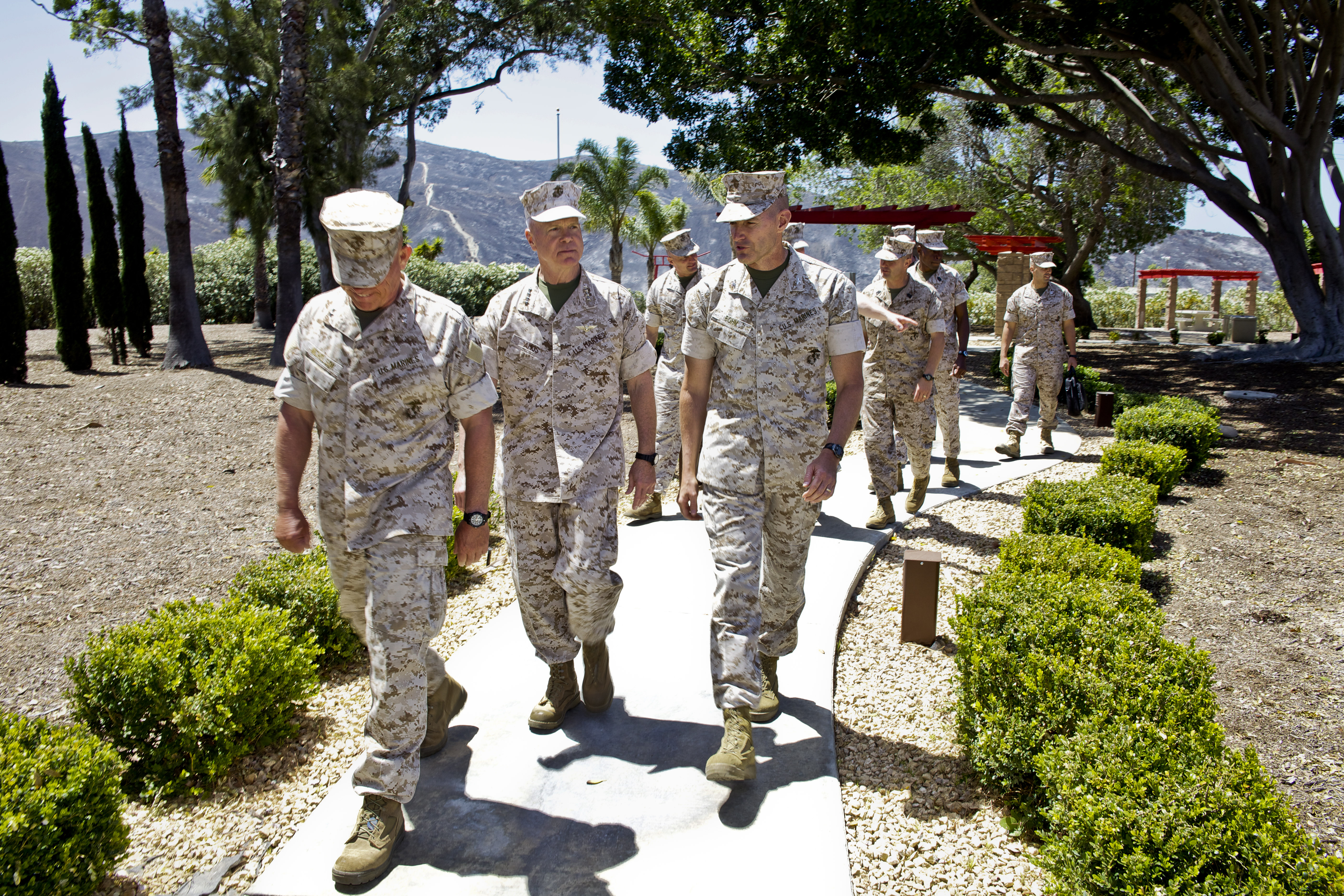
The 35th commandant of the Marine Corps, General James F. Amos, visits the 5th Marine Regiment Memorial during a tour of Marine Corps Air Station Camp Pendleton, CA, on 19 May 2014.

From October 2004 to March 2005 the regimental headquarters staff, led by Colonel Stuart Navarre, was deployed to Iraq in order to take over the role of the Iraqi Security Forces training directorate in support of 1st Marine Division at Camp Blue Diamond. Because the regiment wasn't deployed as a regimental combat team the headquarters staff took on the responsibility of working with the Al Anbar Iraqi National Guard (ING) and the Iraqi Police in Ramadi.

==== Fallujah Deployment, 2006–2007 ====
In February 2006, the regiment deployed as Regimental Combat Team 5 to the Al Anbar Province, Iraq and assumed control of the greater Fallujah area from the 8th Marine Regiment. They conducted combat operations, which included the training and advising of Iraqi forces in conjunction with military transition teams (MiTT) and police transition teams (PiTT). RCT-5 was camped in Camp Fallujah under the command of I Marine Expeditionary Force(Fwd) until January 2007 when they were relieved in place by the 6th Marine Regiment (RCT 6), the first time in 94 years that the two regiments have been together on the battlefield.

As of December 2007, the 5th Marine Regiment had lost 221 members during combat operations in Iraq. This includes members of the regiment and of other battalions that served under 5th Marines.

In early December 2007, 5th Marines dedicated a memorial for the 221 men killed in Iraq. The names include those of seven Army soldiers attached to the regiment. A group of Orange County residents formed a group called the 5th Marine Regiment Memorial fund in early 2007 and raised more than $72,000 to pay for the memorial. Modeled after barriers in Iraq to help prevent car and truck bombings, the memorial carries an inscription at the top reading "Fallen and Never Forgotten," and one at the bottom reading "Freedom Fighter Fallen Warrior."

==== Al Asad Deployment, 2008–2009 ====
In late December 2007 and early January 2008, the regiment deployed again as Regimental Combat Team 5 (RCT-5) to the Al Anbar Province, Iraq and assumed control of the greater Al Asad area and western portion of the province from the 2nd Marine Regiment (RCT-2). They conducted combat operations, which included the training and advising of Iraqi forces, and along with RCT-1 and Multi National Forces-West (MNF-W), oversaw Anbar's pacification and eventual transfer to provincial Iraqi control. RCT-5 also participated in the initial stage of the retrograde of thousands of pieces of equipment out of Iraq. RCT-5 was in Camp Ripper, Al Asad, under the command of I Marine Expeditionary Force (Fwd) and led by Colonel Patrick J. Malay. In January 2009, RCT-5 was relieved in place by the 8th Marine Regiment (RCT-8). Throughout the deployment, RCT-5 lost one Marine and one Soldier who served in units under the regiment while conducting combat operations.

In early 2009, 5th Marines was designated as a contingency force due to back-to-back 13 month deployments in support of Operation Iraqi Freedom (OIF). The regiment continued to participate in exercises and contingency deployments with the 1st Marine Division and prepared forces for deployment.

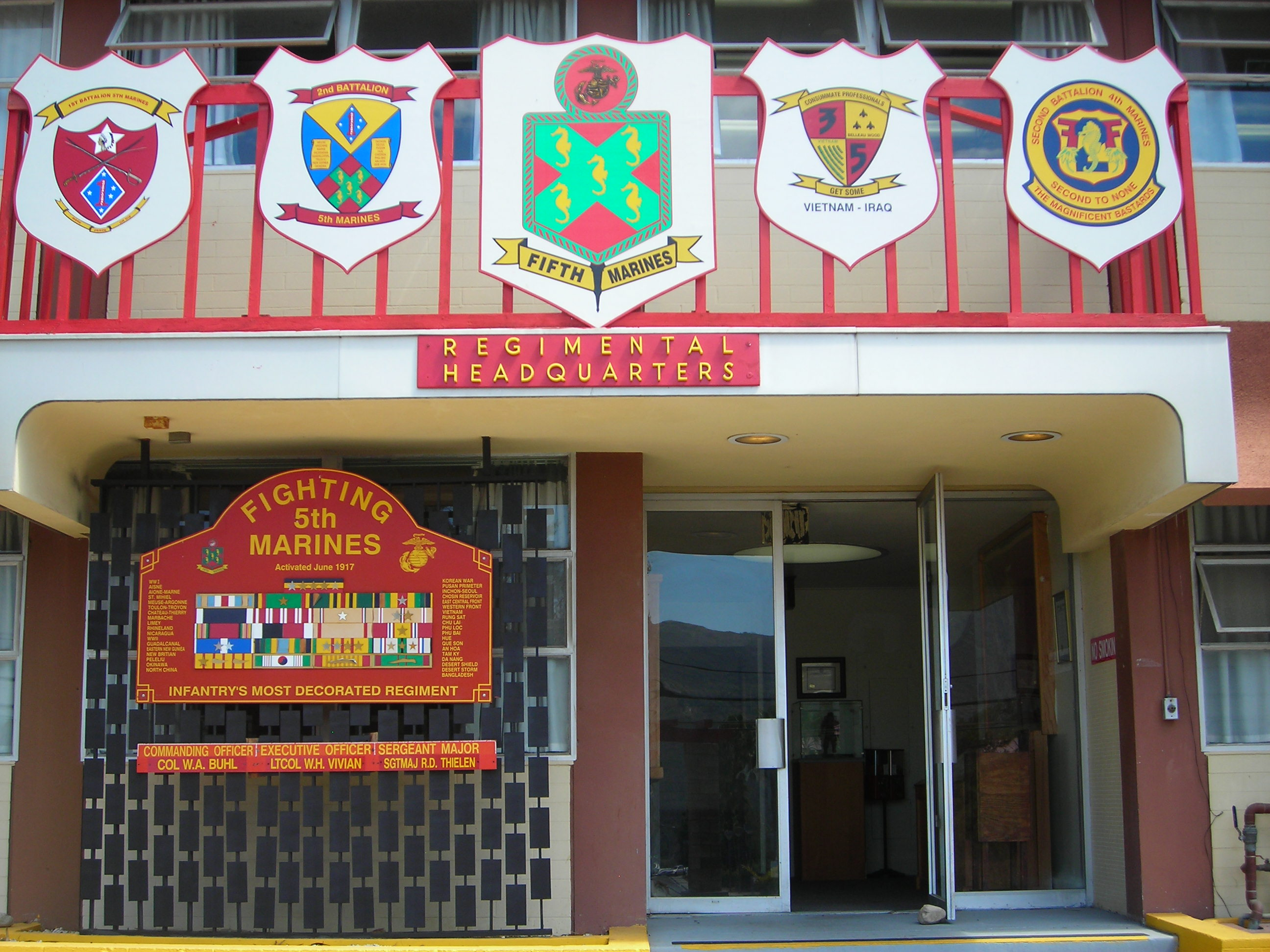
Regimental Command Post entrance in 2009.

==== Afghanistan Deployment, 2011–2012 ====
In August 2011, 5th Marines deployed as Regimental Combat Team 5 (RCT-5), for the first time to Helmand province, Afghanistan in support of Operation Enduring Freedom. They conducted a Relief-In-Place (RIP) with the 1st Marine Regiment (RCT-1) and under the command of Colonel Roger Turner, assumed control of their area of operations of Marjah, Garmsir and Nawa districts. RCT-5 was based out of Camp Dwyer. Their focus was on developing local defense forces in Garmsir and Nawa, mentoring and expanding the police force across southern Helmand, providing further training to the Afghan National Army and supporting the retrograde of thousands of pieces of equipment out of Afghanistan. In early July 2012, RCT-5 conducted a RIP with RCT-6. RCT-5 returned to Camp Pendleton, California, in early August 2012.

In August 2012, LtCol Jason Bohm was selected to be the next regimental commander.

==== Exercise Desert Scimitar, spring 2013 ====
In April through early May 2013, 5th Marines participated in Exercise Desert Scimitar at Marine Corps Air Ground Combat Center, 29 Palms, California. The purpose of the exercise was to command and control a Marine air ground task force (MAGTF) as part of the Marine Corps' shift from counterinsurgency back to conventional, linear warfare in light of the war in Afghanistan winding down. The training exercise included units from ground combat, aviation and logistics elements. Fifth Marine Regiment formed as a regimental combat team, focusing on practicing traditional warfare command and control tactics directing infantry, artillery and armored assets. The regiment practiced direct small and medium arms fire with infantrymen serving with 2nd Battalion, 5th Marines, and 1st Bn, 7th Marines; high-explosive indirect fires with the artillery of 2nd Battalion, 11th Marines; armored support assets of 1st Tank Battalion; and 3rd Light Armored Reconnaissance Battalion during the exercise.

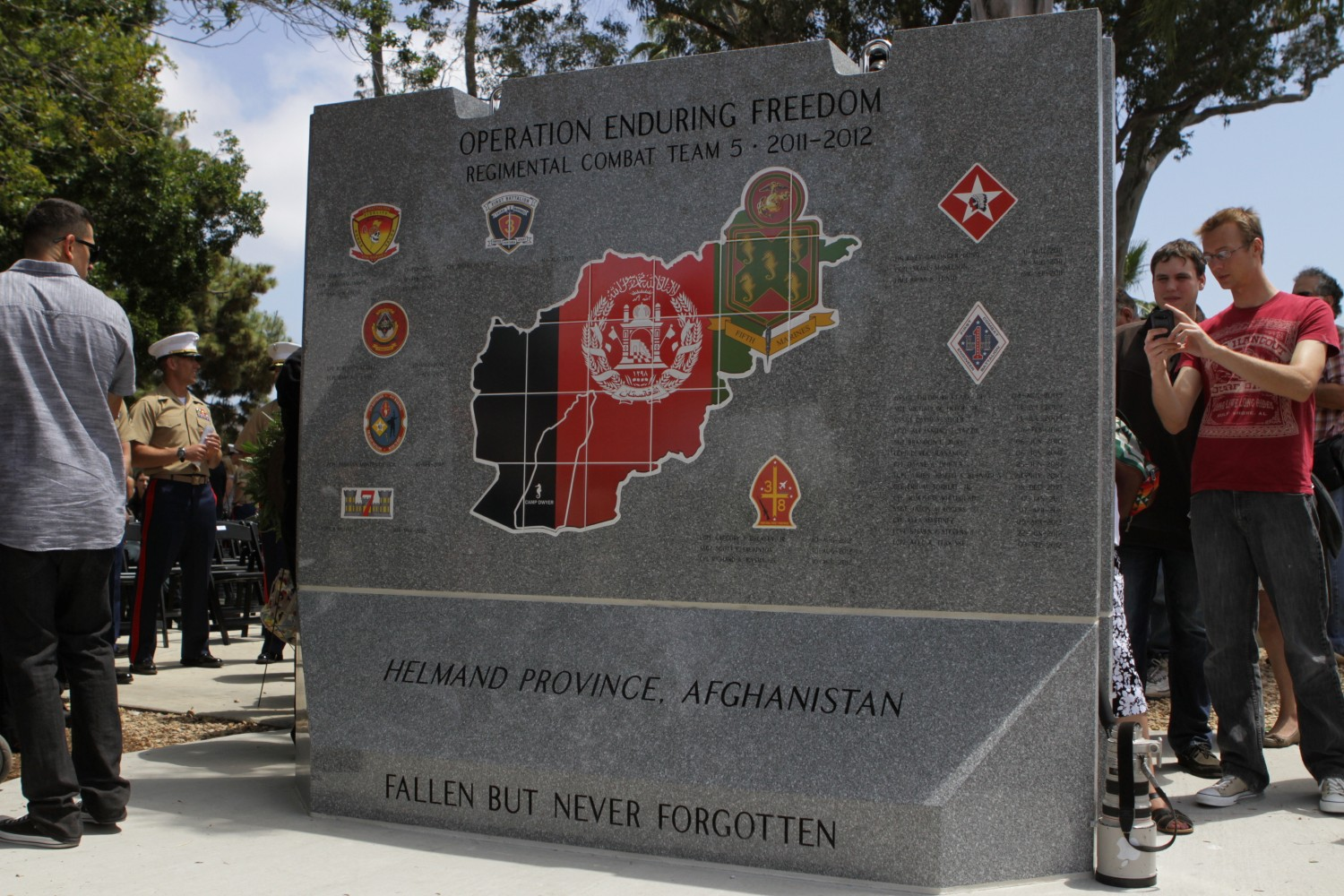
The memorial honors Marines and sailors who served with 5th Marines or under Regimental Combat Team 5 who died in Afghanistan.

In late May 2013, Marines of 5th Marine Regiment participated in a training exhibition with the French 21st Marine Infantry Regiment in Frejus, France. The Marines learned about and fired French weapons systems, including the FAMAS G2 assault rifle. They also used kayaks to venture into the Mediterranean Sea, providing the Marines with an opportunity to learn about the French Marines' reconnaissance tactics.

In June 2013, Marines serving with 5th Marine Regiment gathered for the regiment's Operation Enduring Freedom Memorial Dedication ceremony. More than a hundred Marines, veterans and Gold Star Mothers gathered at the San Mateo Memorial Garden to join the regiment at the ceremony. The names of the Marines and sailors who fought and died serving with a 5th Marines battalion or under Regimental Combat Team 5 in Afghanistan are etched into the 7-ton, granite memorial. The 7-foot tall, 8-foot, 4-inch wide memorial was created in Barre, Vt., and traveled to Camp Pendleton in a 10-day journey where it was escorted every mile of the trip by Patriot Guard Riders, a motorcycle club that strongly supports service members by welcoming them home from deployments. Etched into the bottom of the memorial stone are the words, "FALLEN BUT NEVER FORGOTTEN."

==== Special purpose marine air-ground task force, May 2014 – December 2016 ====
In May 2014, 5th Marine Regiment was named the Headquarters Element of a Special Purpose Marine Air-Ground Task Force (SP-MAGTF). The SP-MAGTF will act as CENTCOM's crisis response unit with Colonel Jason Bohm commanding it. It will also prove CENTCOM's ability to support theater security cooperation events such as exercises as well as respond to contingencies. The task force will be located in Kuwait, but will eventually operate from several different locations in the Middle East. The SP-MAGTF is composed of 2,300 Marines from Headquarters Company, 5th Marine Regiment, Camp Pendleton, California, 2nd Battalion, 7th Marines, Twentynine Palms, Calif., Marine Medium Tiltrotor Squadron 363, Miramar, Calif. and Marine Aerial Refueler Transport Squadron 234, Naval Air Station Joint Reserve Base Fort Worth, Texas. Most units will be deployed for six or seven months, although the regimental headquarters may see a longer rotation.

By January 2015, the SPMAGTF was operating in six countries within CENTCOM. For security concerns and out of deference to foreign partners in the region, it was not given a proper name. The task force flew both kinetic and non-kinetic missions daily in support of Operation Inherent Resolve, the U.S.-led intervention against ISIS. The Marine Corps forces used existing infrastructure to create a partnership capacity site in Iraq designed to increase the capabilities of the Iraqi Security Forces (ISF). In addition, the SPMAGTF took advantage of bilateral training opportunities in theater. The unit participated in Exercise Red Reef with Navy, Marine Corps, and Royal Saudi Navy forces.

On 30 March 2015, the Advance Party (ADVON) returned to Camp Pendleton, California. On 12 April 2015, the main body returned. 5th Marines relinquished command to 7th Marines.

In April 2016, 5th Marines again led the command element for the Special Purpose Marine Air Ground Task Force–Crisis Response–Central Command on a 9-month deployment into harm's way. The SPMAGTF conducted combat operations against ISIS in support of Operation Inherent Resolve, with lines of effort focused on conducting theater security cooperation, contingency operations, crisis response, and advancing the force in the Central Command area of operations, returning in December 2016 after a successful deployment

==== March 2017 to present ====
On 2 March 2017, Colonel George C. Schreffler III took command of 5th Marines.

== Unit awards ==
A unit citation or commendation is an award bestowed upon an organization for the action cited. Members of the unit who participated in said actions are allowed to wear on their uniforms the awarded unit citation. The 5th Marine Regiment has been presented with the following awards:

Streamer	Award	Year(s)	Additional Info
	Presidential Unit Citation Streamer with two Silver Stars	1942, 1944, 1945, 1950, 1950, 1950, 1951, 1966–1967, 1967, 1967–1968, 2003	Guadalcanal, Peleliu-Ngesebus, Okinawa, Korea, Vietnam, Iraq
	Joint Meritorious Unit Award Streamer	1991	Bangladesh
	Navy Unit Commendation Streamer with four bronze stars	1952–1953, 1968–1969, 1990–1991, 2006–2007, 2010-2011	Korea, Vietnam, Southwest Asia, Iraq, Afghanistan
	Meritorious Unit Commendation Streamer	1968	Vietnam
	World War I Victory Streamer		
	Army of Occupation of Germany Medal		
	Second Nicaraguan Campaign Medal		
	American Defense Service Streamer with one Bronze Star	1941	World War II
	Asiatic-Pacific Campaign Streamer with one Silver and one Bronze Star		Guadalcanal, Eastern New Guinea, New Britain, Peleliu, Okinawa
	World War II Victory Streamer	1941–1945	Pacific War
	Navy Occupation Service Streamer with "ASIA"		
	China Service Streamer		North China
	National Defense Service Streamer with three Bronze Stars	1950–1954, 1961–1974, 1990–1995, 2001–present	Korean War, Vietnam War, Gulf War, war on terrorism
	Korean Service Streamer with two Silver Stars	1950–1953	Inchon-Seoul, Chosin Reservoir, East-Central Front, Western Front
	Vietnam Service Streamer with two Silver and three Bronze Stars	July 1965 – April 1971, April–December 1975	Chu Lai, Da Nang, Dong Ha, Qui Nhon, Huế, Phu Bai, Quang Tri, Operation New Arrival
	Southwest Asia Service Streamer with three Bronze Stars		
	Afghanistan Campaign Streamer with one bronze star		
A multicolored streamer with (from outer to inner) red, white, green, white again, black (the colors of the Iraqi flag) horizontal stripes with a yellow horizontal stripe in the center	Iraq Campaign Streamer with three Bronze Stars		
	Global War on Terrorism Expeditionary Streamer		March–May 2003
	Global War on Terrorism Service Streamer	2001–present	
	Croix de Guerre Streamer with two Palms and one Gilt Star	1918	World War I
	Korea Presidential Unit Citation Streamer		
	Vietnam Gallantry Cross with Palm Streamer		
	Vietnam Meritorious Unit Citation Civil Actions Streamer		

== Notable former members ==
- William W. Ashurst, brigadier general, USMC. Served with 18th Company, 2nd Battalion during World War I.
- Joseph M. Baker, Private in 67th Company, recipient of the Army Distinguished Service Cross and the Navy Cross during the Battle of Belleau Wood
- Lewis K. Bausell, corporal, received Medal of Honor while serving with 1st Battalion during Battle of Peleliu
- Robert Blake, major general, USMC. Served with 17th Company, 1st Battalion during World War I.
- Robert D. Bohn, major general, USMC. Commanded 5th Marines during the Vietnam War.
- Harold D. Campbell, major general, USMC. Served with 23rd Company, 2nd Battalion during World War I.
- Samuel C. Cumming, major general, USMC. Served with 51st Company, 2nd Battalion during World War I.
- Alphonse DeCarre, major general, USMC. Commanded the Headquarters Company during World War I.
- Lester A. Dessez, brigadier general, USMC. Commanded 18th Company, 2nd Battalion in 1922.
- Duane E. Dewey, MOH, corporal, USMC. Served with Company E, 2nd Battalion during Korean War. Medal of Honor and Purple Heart.
- Walter G. Farrell, major general, USMC. Served with 51st Company, 2nd Battalion during World War I.
- William S. Fellers, major general, USMC. Served as regiment's executive officer during World War II.
- Joseph H. Fellows, brigadier general, USMC. Served with 20th Company, 3rd Battalion during World War I.
- Julian N. Frisbie, brigadier general, USMC. Commanded 5th Marines during the occupation of North China in 1945.
- LeRoy P. Hunt, lieutenant general, USMC. Served with 17th Company, 1st Battalion during World War I.
- Gilder D. Jackson Jr., brigadier general, USMC. Served with 43rd Company, 2nd Battalion during World War I.
- Ralph S. Keyser, major general, USMC. Commanded the 2nd Battalion during World War I.
- Matthew H. Kingman, brigadier general, USMC. Served as regiment's executive officer in 1935-1937
- Henry Louis Larsen, lieutenant general, USMC. Commanded the 3rd Battalion during World War I.
- August Larson, major general, USMC. Commanded the regiment in 1946.
- Charles D. Mize, major general, USMC. Commanded George Company, 3rd Battalion during Korean War.
- Jonas M. Platt, major general, USMC. Commanded 1st Battalion during Korean War.
- Bennet Puryear Jr., major general, USMC. Served as regimental supply officer during World War I.
- Leonard E. Rea, major general, USMC. Served with 17th Company, 1st Battalion during World War I.
- Keller E. Rockey, lieutenant general, USMC. Served with 67th Company, 1st Battalion during World War I.
- William J. Scheyer, major general, USMC. Served with 16th Company, 3rd Battalion during Fleet Problem III.
- Maurice E. Shearer, brigadier general, USMC. Commanded the 3rd Battalion during World War I.
- Lemuel C. Shepherd Jr., general, USMC. Served with 55th Company, 2nd Battalion during World War I.
- Amor L. Sims, brigadier general, USMC. Served with 17th Company, 1st Battalion during World War I.
- Merwin H. Silverthorn, lieutenant general, USMC. Served with 16th Company, 3rd Battalion during World War I.
- Eugene Sledge, corporal, USMC. Served with 3rd Battalion during World War II.
- Laurence Stallings, platoon commander with 3rd Battalion, 5th Marines during the fighting at Château-Thierry during World War I. Playwright, author, screenwriter.
- Harold E. Rosecrans, brigadier general, USMC. Served with 55th Company, 2nd Battalion during World War I.
- John T. Walker, lieutenant general, USMC. Served with 51st Company, 2nd Battalion during World War I.
- Richard G. Weede, lieutenant general, USMC. Commanded the regiment during Korean War.
- Charles F. Widdecke, major general, USMC. Commanded the regiment in 1965 in the early phase of Vietnam War.
- Roswell Winans, brigadier general, USMC. Served with 17th Company, 1st Battalion during World War I.
- Fred Becker, second lieutenant, served with 18th Company, 2nd Battalion during World War I.
- Joseph F. Dunford, Jr., general, USMC. Former Chairman of the Joint Chiefs. Commanded 5th Marine Regiment during 2003 invasion of Iraq.
- Sergeant Reckless

== See also ==
- With the Old Breed
- History of the United States Marine Corps
- List of United States Marine Corps regiments
