= Chad Slade (American football) =

American football player (born 1992)

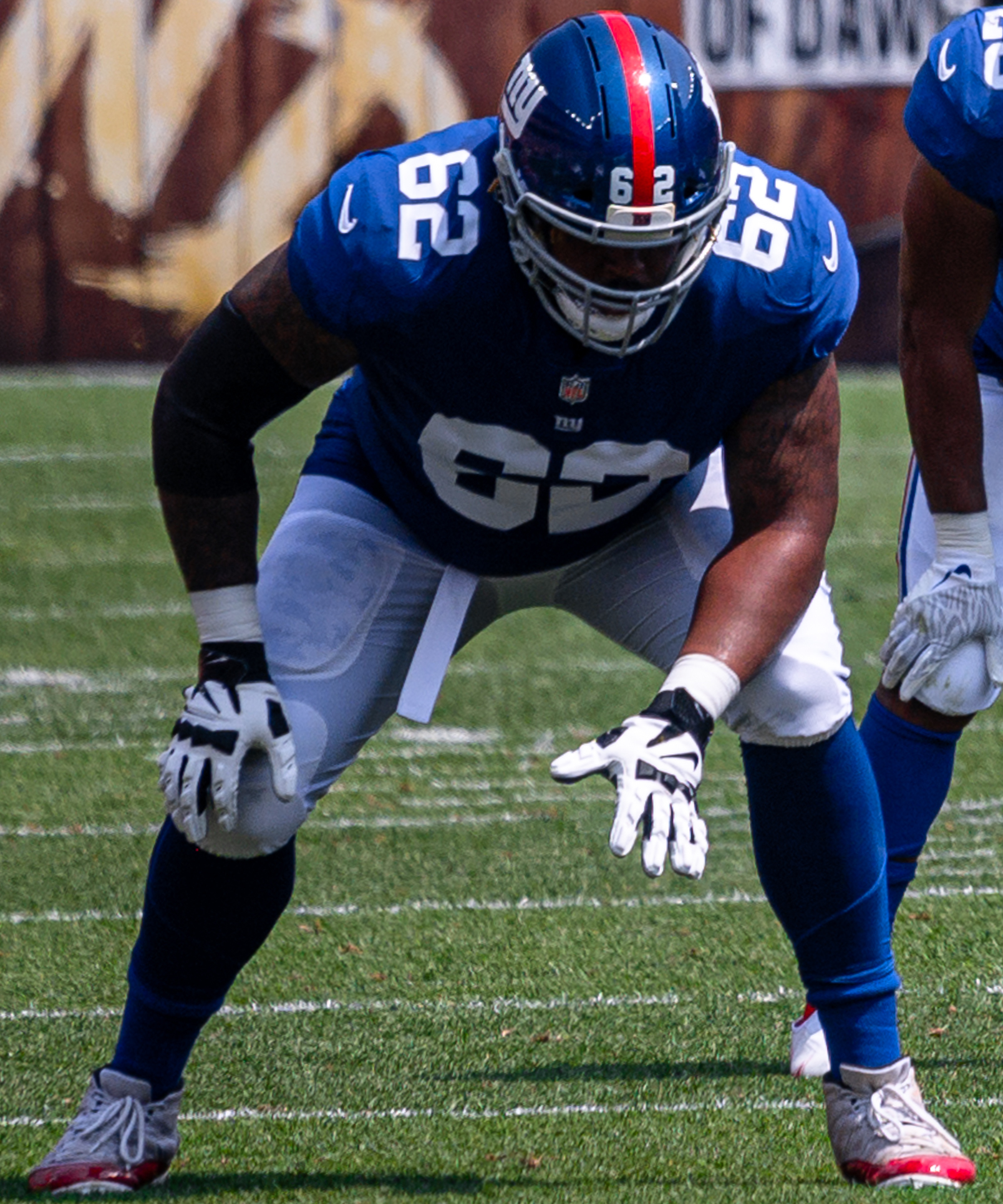
- Slade with the New York Giants in 2021

Profile
- Position: Guard

Personal information
- Born: May 4, 1992 (age 34); Atlanta, Georgia, U.S.
- Listed height: 6 ft 5 in (1.96 m)
- Listed weight: 315 lb (143 kg)

Career information
- High school: Moody (Moody, Alabama)
- College: Auburn
- NFL draft: 2015: undrafted

Career history
- Houston Texans (2015–2018); New York Giants (2019–2020)

Career NFL statistics
- Games played: 18
- Games started: 3
- Stats at Pro Football Reference

Chad Torress Slade (born May 4, 1992) is an American former professional football player who was a guard in the National Football League (NFL). He played college football for the Auburn Tigers.

== College career ==
Slade was a four-year starter at Auburn from 2010 to 2014. His 49 career starts were the second most among SEC offensive lineman and fourth-most in Auburn history.

== Professional career ==
Pre-draft measurables
Height	Weight	Arm length	Hand span	40-yard dash	10-yard split	20-yard split	20-yard shuttle	Three-cone drill	Vertical jump	Broad jump	Bench press
6 ft 5 1/4 in (1.96 m)	313 lb (142 kg)	35 in (0.89 m)	9 1/4 in (0.23 m)	5.13 s	1.90 s	3.03 s	4.74 s	7.91 s	29.5 in (0.75 m)	8 ft 10 in (2.69 m)	25 reps
All values from Pro Day

=== Houston Texans ===
Slade signed with the Houston Texans as an undrafted free agent on May 8, 2015. He was placed on injured reserve on September 5, 2015, where he spent his entire rookie season.

On September 3, 2016, Slade was waived by the Texans and was signed to the practice squad the next day. He signed a reserve/future contract with the Texans on January 16, 2017, after spending the entire season on their practice squad.

On September 2, 2017, Slade was waived by the Texans and was signed to the practice squad the next day. He was promoted to the active roster on November 29, 2017.

On September 1, 2018, Slade was waived by the Texans and was signed to the practice squad the next day.

=== New York Giants ===
On January 14, 2019, Slade signed a reserve/future contract with the New York Giants. He was waived on September 6, 2020, and re-signed to the practice squad. He was elevated to the active roster on September 14, November 2, and November 7 for the team's weeks 1, 8, and 9 games against the Pittsburgh Steelers, Tampa Bay Buccaneers, and Washington Football Team, and reverted to the practice squad after each game. He signed a reserve/future contract on January 4, 2021.

On August 31, 2021, Slade was released by the Giants.
