= Leeds High School =

Location
- 1500 Greenwave Drive; Leeds, Alabama 35094; United States; 33°32′51″N 86°34′27″W

Information
- Type: Public high school secondary school
- Motto: Promoting achievement, respect, and success
- Established: 1911 (115 years ago)
- School district: Leeds City Schools
- CEEB code: 011600
- Principal: Joey Miller
- Teaching staff: 35.00 (FTE)
- Grades: 9–12
- Gender: Co-educational
- Enrollment: 619 (2023-2024)
- Student to teacher ratio: 17.69
- Campus: Suburban
- Colors: green and white
- Athletics: AHSAA Class 5A
- Nickname: Green Wave
- Rival: Moody High School
- Feeder schools: Leeds Middle School
- Website: lhs.leedsk12.org

Leeds High School is a four-year public high school in the Birmingham, Alabama, United States, community of Leeds. It is the only high school in the Leeds City School System. School colors are green and white, and the athletic teams are called the Green Wave. Leeds competes in Alabama High School Athletic Association (AHSAA) Class 5A athletics.

== History ==
The school was established in 1911 by the Jefferson County School System. A two-story brick building was constructed for $10,000 at Parkway Drive (then called First Avenue South) and Montevallo Road. After the completion of additional classrooms for elementary grades in 1914, the school absorbed the pupils of the Leeds Academy, which closed that year.

The first athletic teams included a basketball club which debuted on Thanksgiving Day in 1914, and a football team, then called The Leeders, which took the field in 1923 under head coach N. B. Breland. A girls' basketball team began playing the next year.

Ground was broken for a new school building in 1925. It opened the next year, but was damaged in a fire in 1928 and had to be almost entirely rebuilt. The Works Progress Administration constructed a second wood frame multi-function building with a small auditorium and library in 1933. In 1938, a permanent auditorium and gymnasium were added onto the school. The basement of that building began serving as a cafeteria in 1939.

In 1954, Leeds High School relocated to the former Stadium School on Whitmire Street, which had been constructed in 1948 to serve the children of workers on the Southern Railroad. The 1926 building was demolished in 1966 to make way for a new Leeds Elementary School. Leeds High School and the previously all-Black Moton School were integrated in 1973. The high school was air-conditioned in 1977, along with the construction of a new gymnasium and classroom wing.

In 2009, Leeds High School moved from Whitmire Street to 1500 Greenwave Drive where it stands today. Whitmire St now houses the Leeds Middle School that moved from the Moton location.

== Student profile ==
Enrollment in grades 9-12 for the 2024-2025 school year was 619 students. 55.9% were white, 23.9% were African-American, 17.4% were Hispanic, 2.6% were multiracial, and 0.2% were American Indian. 51.5% of students qualified for free or reduced price lunch.

Leeds has a graduation rate of 95%. Approximately 32% of all students meet or exceed state requirements in reading and approximately 17% of all students meet or exceed state requirements in math. The average ACT score for Leeds students is 23.

== Athletics ==
Leeds competes in AHSAA Class 5A athletics and fields teams in the following sports:

- American football
- Archery
- Baseball
- Basketball
- Cheerleading
- Cross country
- Golf
- Indoor track and field
- Outdoor track and field
- Soccer
- Softball
- Tennis
- Volleyball
- Wrestling

Leeds has won state championships in the following sports:

- Boys' basketball (2009)
- American football (2008, 2010, 2014, 2015)
- Boys' indoor track and field (2001, 2002)
- Softball (2007)
- Boys' outdoor track and field (1993, 1994, 1995, 1996, 1998, 2000, 2001, 2005)
- Girls' outdoor track and field (2003, 2004, 2005)
- Wrestling (2015)

== Notable alumni ==
- Charles Barkley, former basketball forward for the Philadelphia 76ers, Phoenix Suns and Houston Rockets
- Caitlín R. Kiernan, author and paleontologist
- William R. Lawley Jr., World War II bomber pilot and Medal of Honor recipient
- Jonathan D. Rose, professional American football player and CFL/NFL CFL GreyCup Champion (2016), twice East Division All Star who played for the Ottawa Redblacks and the Edmonton Elks.
