= USS Robert E. Simanek =

US Navy Lewis B. Puller-class expeditionary sea base

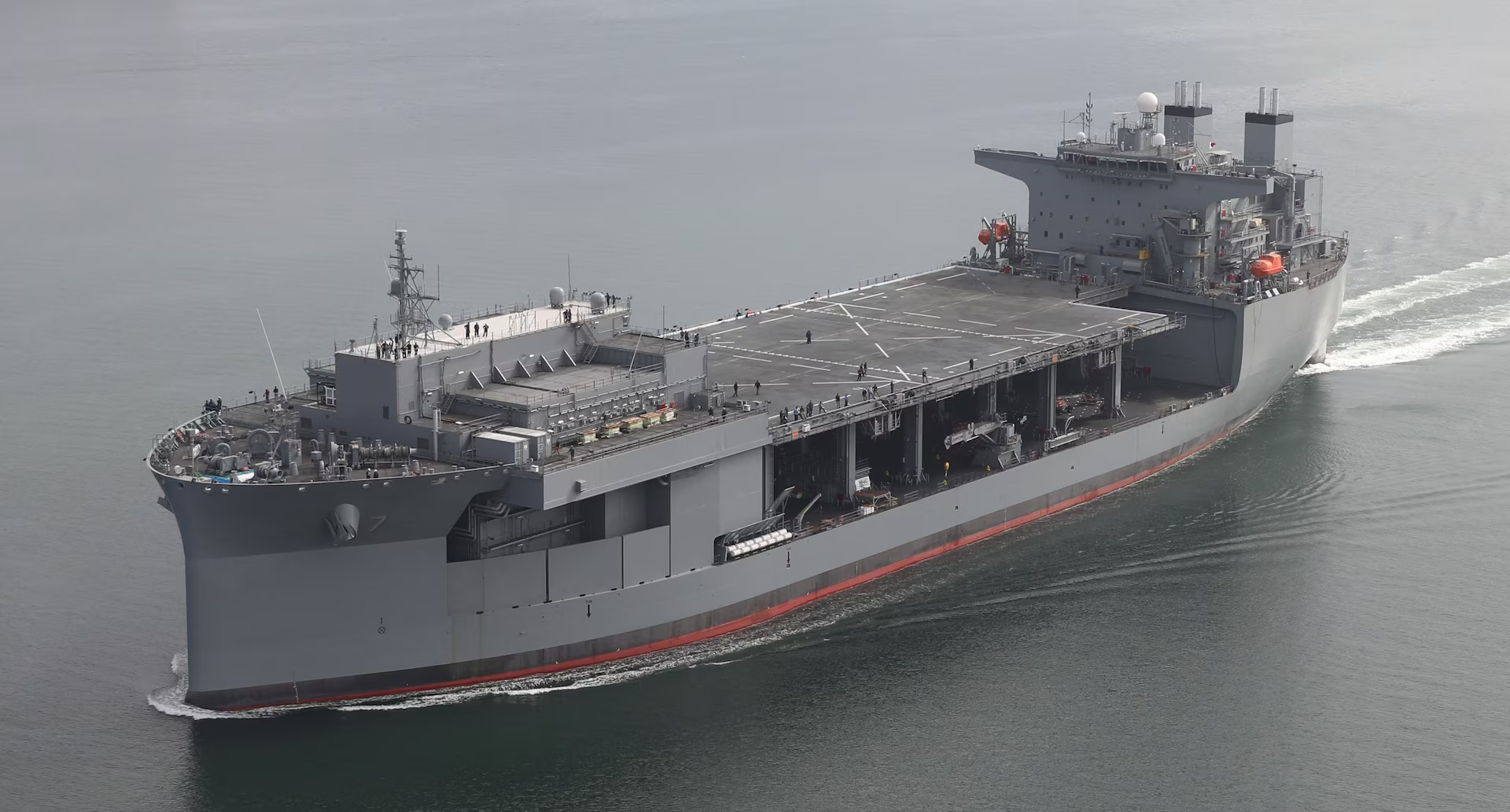
- Robert E. Simanek during her delivery to the US Navy, 2024

History

United States
- Name: Robert E. Simanek
- Namesake: Robert E. Simanek
- Ordered: 23 August 2019
- Builder: NASSCO, San Diego
- Laid down: 27 May 2022 (keel laid down); 21 October 2022 (keel authentication ceremony)
- Sponsored by: Ann Simanek
- Christened: 4 May 2024
- Identification: Hull number: ESB-7
- Status: Under construction
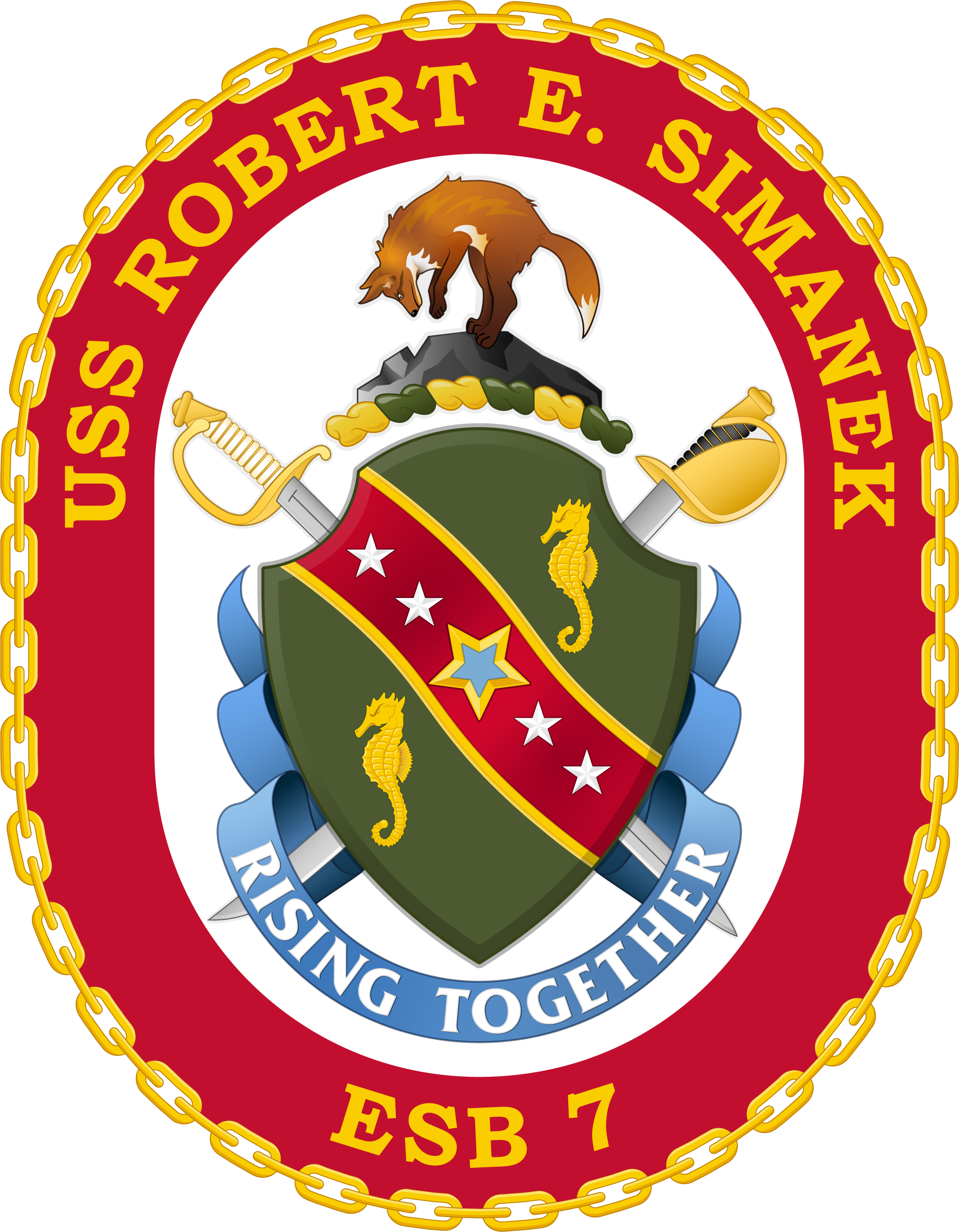
- Badge

General characteristics
- Class & type: Lewis B. Puller-class expeditionary mobile base
- Displacement: Approx. 90,000 long tons (100,000 short tons) fully loaded
- Length: 785 ft (239 m)
- Beam: 164 ft (50 m)
- Draft: 34.4 ft (10.5 m) at full load; 39.4 ft (12.0 m) at load line
- Propulsion: Commercial diesel-electric
- Speed: 15 knots (28 km/h; 17 mph)
- Range: 9,500 nautical miles (17,600 km; 10,900 mi)
- Complement: 34 ship personnel; 250 military (mission dependent)
- Aviation facilities: Four-spot flight deck and hangar

USS Robert E. Simanek (ESB-7) will be a Lewis B. Puller-class expeditionary mobile base for the United States Navy, and she is the first United States Navy vessel named after Marine Corps Private First Class Robert Ernest Simanek, who was awarded for the Medal of Honor for heroic actions during the Battle of Bunker Hill, August 1952, during the Korean War. Secretary of the Navy Kenneth Braithwaite officially announced the name on 15 January 2021, when he visited USS Constitution, the oldest U.S. Navy commissioned ship afloat.

NASSCO laid the keel for the ship, without ceremony, in San Diego on 27 May 2022. An official keel authentication ceremony was held on 21 October of the same year. The Simanek was christened on 4 May 2024 by Ann Simanek Clark, the ship sponsor and daughter of the ship's namesake.
