= Gordon D. Gayle =

US Marine Corps brigadier general

Gordon Donald Gayle
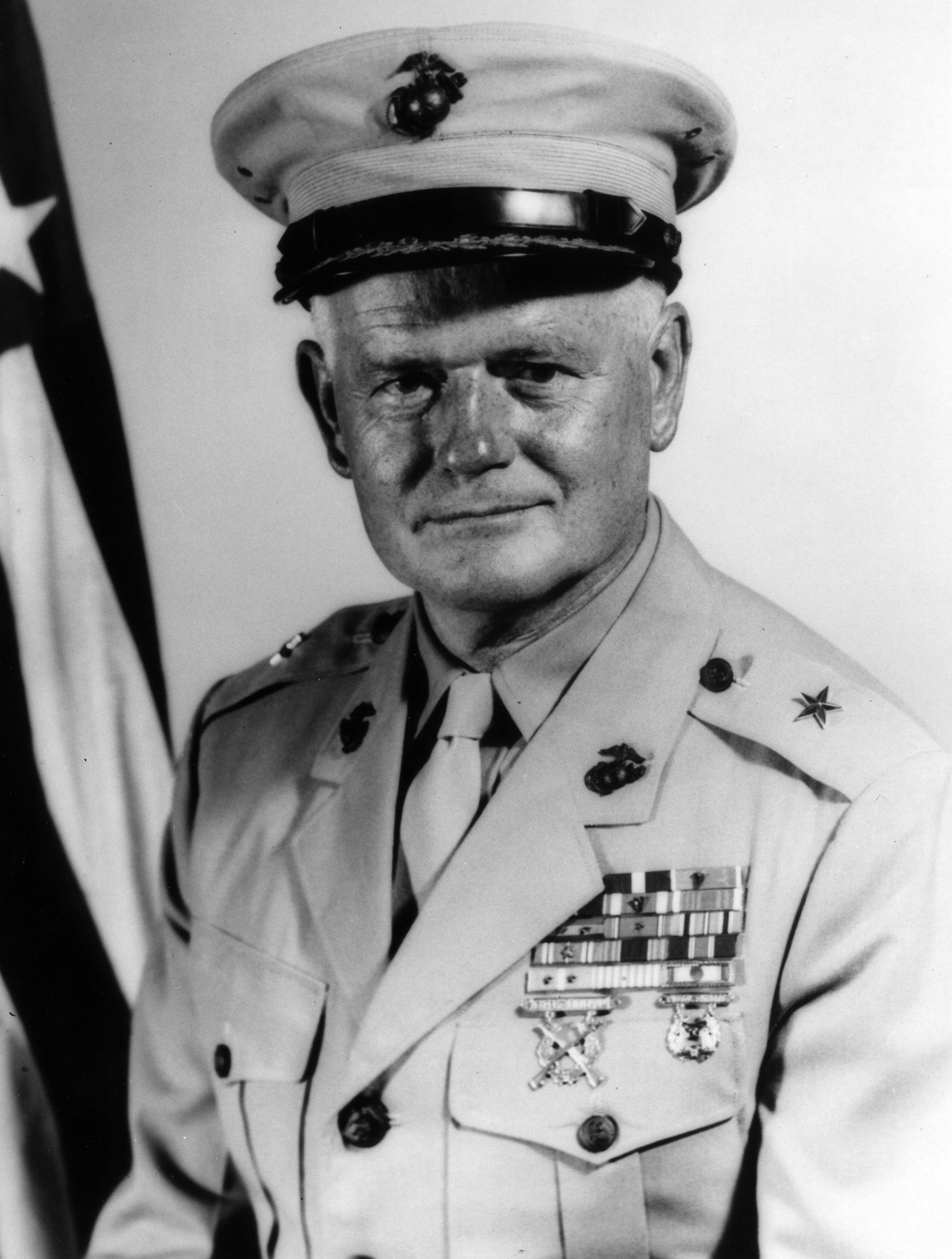
- BGen Gordon D. Gayle, USMC
- Born: September 13, 1917; Tulsa, Oklahoma, US
- Died: April 21, 2013 (aged 95); Farnham, Virginia, US
- Military career
- Allegiance: United States
- Branch: United States Marine Corps
- Service years: 1939–1968
- Rank: Brigadier general
- Nickname: "Don" or "Lucky"
- Commands: Landing Force Training Command, Atlantic; 9th Marine Regiment; 2nd Battalion, 5th Marines
- Conflicts: World War II: Battle of Guadalcanal; Battle of Cape Gloucester; Battle of Talasea; Battle of Peleliu; Korean War
- Awards: Navy Cross; Legion of Merit (2); Bronze Star Medal; Purple Heart
- Other work: Historian, Teacher

Gordon Donald Gayle (September 13, 1917 – April 21, 2013) was an American officer in the United States Marine Corps with the rank of brigadier general and historian. A veteran of World War II and Korea, he distinguished himself as commanding officer, 2nd Battalion, 5th Marines and received Navy Cross, the United States military's second-highest decoration awarded for valor in combat.

He later served as chairman, Long Range Study Panel which was tasked with the developing of concepts for the Marine Corps operational, organizational, logistical and Research and Development needs for the 1985 period. The study was a catalyst in forming a coherent Marine Corps vision of its future.

== Early career ==
Gordon D. Gayle was born on September 13, 1917, in Tulsa, Oklahoma, as the son of businessman with the oil-field equipment, Maurice Rowe Gayle and his wife Frances Madge. He completed the grammar school in Shreveport, Louisiana, in summer 1930 and subsequently graduated from the Sunset High School in Dallas, Texas, in June 1934. Gayle then enrolled the Southern Methodist University in Dallas, but left after one year, when received appointment to the United States Naval Academy at Annapolis, Maryland.

During his time at the academy, Gayle was active in Reception Committee, Quarterdeck Society, Radio Club or Boat Club and graduated on June 1, 1939, on the outset of the world war II. Following his graduation, he was commissioned as a second lieutenant in the Marine Corps and ordered to the Basic School at Philadelphia Navy Yard for basic officer training, which he completed in April 1940. Gayle was then ordered to Marine Corps Base Quantico, Virginia, where he served in several company and battalion-level positions including company commander in the 3rd Battalion, 5th Marines under Lieutenant Colonel George R. Rowan. He deployed with his unit to Guantánamo Bay, Cuba and took part in a series of training and landing exercises there and at Vieques, Puerto Rico in early 1941.

He returned to the mainland with the 5th Marines Regiment, which had been part of the 1st Marine Brigade but during this period became an element of the newly formed 1st Marine Division. The division began training in New River (later named Camp Lejeune), North Carolina, in September 1941 and was promoted to the rank of first lieutenant in November 1941, several weeks before the Japanese attack on Pearl Harbor.

== World War II ==
Following the United States entry into World War II, the 1st MarDiv began intensive training and preparation for combat deployment. Gayle was promoted to the rank of captain in May 1942 and left with the division by navy transport the Pacific, en route evading German torpedo attack and then transitting the Panama Canal and continuing to New Zealand, while other elements of the 1st MarDiv left the United States for New Zealand by sea from San Francisco. One month later, in Wellington, the division reloaded its ships for amphibious assault and was then ordered under its commanding officer Major General Alexander A. Vandegrift to Guadalcanal, Solomon Islands, in early August 1942.

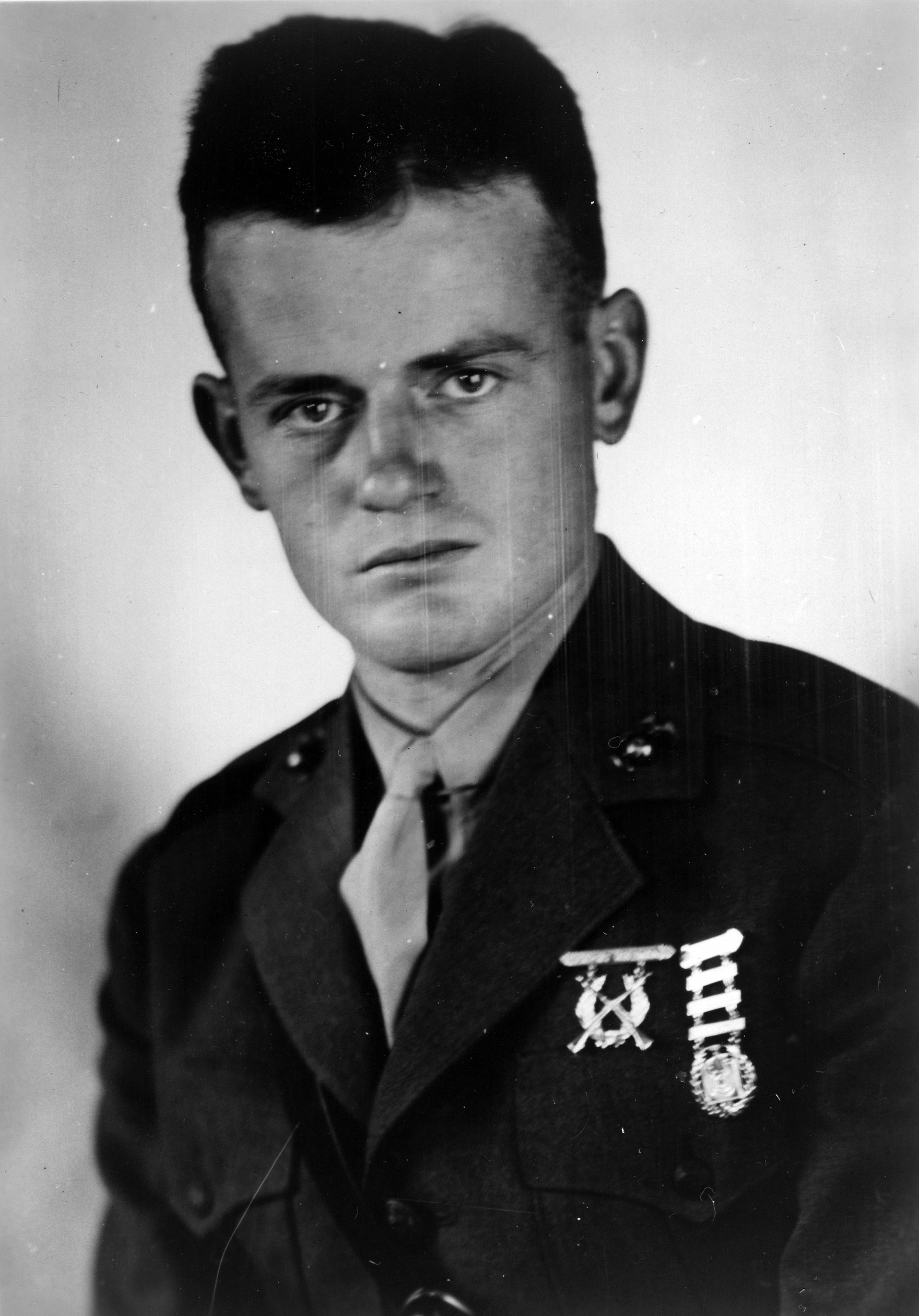
Gayle as 2nd lieutenant in November 1939

Gayle was appointed operations officer of 1st Battalion, 5th Marines and took part in the initial landing on Guadalcanal on August 7 and capture of the Japanese airfield under construction. The construction was finished by Seabees and Marine engineers and named Henderson Field one day later. Some days later, and after U.S. Navy units had been compelled to withdraw temporarily from the Guadalcanal area, Gayle while on battalion-level reconnaissance outside the Henderson Field perimeter, discovered a powerful working radio that the retreating Japanese had left behind. Gayle received orders to destroy the radio because of the possibility that it was booby-trapped and because of general revulsion, after the notorious Goettge Patrol incident, among many officers for the taking of Japanese souvenirs. Finding no evidence of sabotage and recognizing the potential utility of a powerful radio, Gayle left the radio intact.

Following heavy ship losses during the Battle of Savo Island, Vice Admiral Richmond K. Turner temporarily withdrew naval forces from the immediate Guadalcanal area, including the transports holding key undelivered Marine supplies and equipment. Until naval units, under the inspirational leadership of Admiral William "Bull" Halsey returned to continue their ultimately successful but heavily contested and heroic support for the 1st Marine Division on Guadalcanal, the only means of long-range communication available to the hard-pressed Division was the Japanese radio Gayle had identified and safeguarded.

Gayle participated in the grueling fighting for control of Guadalcanal which continued throughout the fall and winter of defense of Henderson Field 1942. Along with the rest of the 1st Marine Division Gayle left Guadalcanal when they were relieved by U.S. Army units in December 1942. The division sailed to Australia for rest and refit, in Brisbane and later in Melbourne. Gayle was stationed at Camp Balcombe near the town of Mount Martha, Victoria, where he was appointed 5th Marine Regiment Operations officer under Colonel John T. Selden. He was promoted to the rank of major in April 1943.

After few months of training in Australia, Gayle sailed with 5th Marines to the staging area at Milne Bay, New Guinea, at the end of September 1943, where he took part in advanced combat training, emphasizing shore-to-shore operations and utilizing terrain closely resembling that on New Britain—the future 1st Marine Division objective.

Gayle landed on Cape Gloucester, New Britain, on December 29, 1943, and after week of spent in combat area, he succeeded Lieutenant Colonel Lewis W. Walt as commanding officer of 2nd Battalion, 5th Marines (shorthand designation: "2/5") on January 5, 1944, during intensive combats in Borgen Bay. Gayle led his battalion during the Battle of Talasea at the beginning of March of that year and helped to capture the area. For his service at New Britain, Gayle received the Bronze Star Medal with Combat "V".

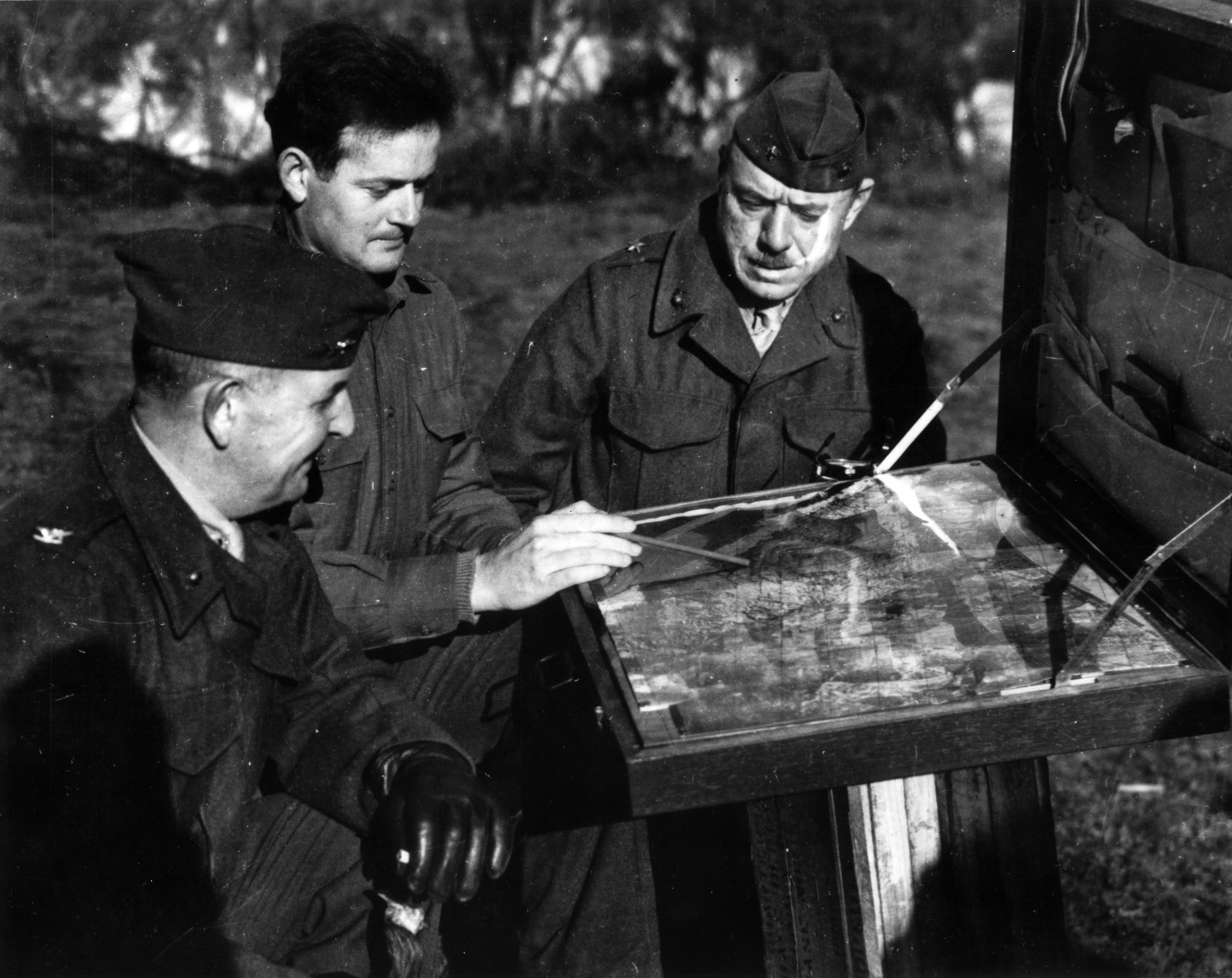
Major Gayle (center) plots the field map with general William H. Rupertus (right) and Colonel John T. Selden, commanding the 5th Marines near Mount Martha, Australia, in July 1943.

His battalion was then ordered to Pavuvu, Russell Islands in June 1944 for rest and refit, but the island of Pavuvu, which at that point had not been prepared to receive troops, was anything but a paradise. The island was rain-soaked and rat-infested and instead of participating in a gradual rehabilitation-training program, the 5th Marines had to construct bivouac areas from scratch. Soon morale reached a low point, for with all the work, there was little material for rebuilding the mental and physical strength of Gayle's Marines. The food consisted mostly of rations similar to those consumed in New Britain campaign and visits to sick call became more numerous.

In the early morning of September 15, 1944, Gayle and his battalion (2/5) sailed for Peleliu, Palau Islands to capture the large Japanese airfield there, which was seen as a threat to General MacArthur's lines of communication for his upcoming invasion of the Philippines. The 5th Marine Regiment was charged to land, drive across the airfield, cut the island in two, and then re-orient north and drive to secure the eastern half of the island. During the heavy fighting for the airfield, Gayle and his battalion, along with other Marine units, repulsed a strong Japanese counterattack which included light tanks and subsequently led his battalion in the assault across the airfield—over fourteen hundred yards of open ground—in the face of intense rifle mortar, artillery and machine-gun fire. Although later wounded in a mortar blast which killed much of his command unit, Gayle refused evacuation and remained in command, thereby speeding 2/5's seizure and securing of the major portion of the airfield against fanatical enemy resistance and fierce counterattacks.

For his leadership and heroism in action on Peleliu, Gayle was decorated with Navy Cross, the United States military's second-highest decoration awarded for valor in combat. He also received the Purple Heart for his combat wound and was ordered to back to the United States for treatment.

Upon his arrival to the United States in November 1944, Gayle was promoted to the rank of lieutenant colonel and attached to the staff of Marine Corps Schools, Quantico, where he served under former 1st Marine Division commander, Major General William H. Rupertus as an instructor at the Command and Staff School. Gayle taught in that capacity until February 1945, when he was assigned to the Army Command and General Staff College at Fort Leavenworth, Kansas. He graduated in May of that year and returned to the teaching staff of Marine Corps Schools, Quantico.

== Postwar career ==
In May 1947, Gayle became military plans and assistant operations officer on the staff of the commander, Amphibious Group One and Transport Squadron One, in San Diego, California, and served in this capacity until December 1948. Gayle was then ordered to Headquarters Marine Corps in Washington, D.C., and served with the Division of Plans and Policies until June 1949, when he was appointed assistant director of Marine Corps History Division and deputy to Brigadier General Clayton C. Jerome. During his service in this capacity, he wrote the Marine Corps official history of the Peleliu battle and several other history publications. He also authored in later years the Marine Corps official monograph Bloody Beaches: The Marines at Peleliu.

=== Korean War ===
Following the outbreak of Korean War, Gayle was ordered to Korea in September 1951 and assumed duty as executive officer, 7th Marine Regiment under Colonel Herman Nickerson Jr. on September 20. His regiment was held in divisional reserve for the 1st Marine Division following the Battle of the Punchbowl, but soon returned to the front line. Facing elements of the Chinese PLA, the 7th Marines were part of the Division's main defensive position. Local skirmishes and clashes were continuous and ongoing but no major engagements. Gayle remained in that capacity until November 14, 1951, and received the Navy Commendation Medal with Combat "V" for his service in that capacity.

He was then transferred to divisional staff under Major General Gerald C. Thomas and assumed duty as assistant chief of staff for operations (G-3). The division was sent to western Korea in March 1952, where it took over a sector of the extreme left of the UN line with the responsibility of blocking the historic invasion route to Seoul. Gayle remained in that capacity until the end of April 1952 and then returned to the United States for a severe family medical emergency. For his service on the staff of 1st Marine Division, Gayle received the Legion of Merit with Combat "V".

=== 1952–1968 ===
Upon his return stateside, Gayle was ordered to Dallas, Texas, for duty as executive officer, Southern Recruiting Area and served in this capacity until February 1953, when he was transferred to Washington, D.C., for duty as officer in charge, Recruiting Branch and later as acting assistant director, 5th Marine Corps Reserve and Recruitment District.

In May 1953, Gayle was ordered to Marine Corps Base Quantico, Virginia, where he assumed duty as an instructor at the Marine Corps Educational Center. While there he was promoted to colonel in June 1955 and was appointed head of tactics and operations instruction at the Marine Command and Staff College, Quantico. Gayle was ordered to Headquarters Marine Corps in July 1956 and appointed assistant head, Plans Branch. He later became branch head and served in this capacity until assigned as a student to the National War College, Fort McNair, Washington, D.C., in August 1959.

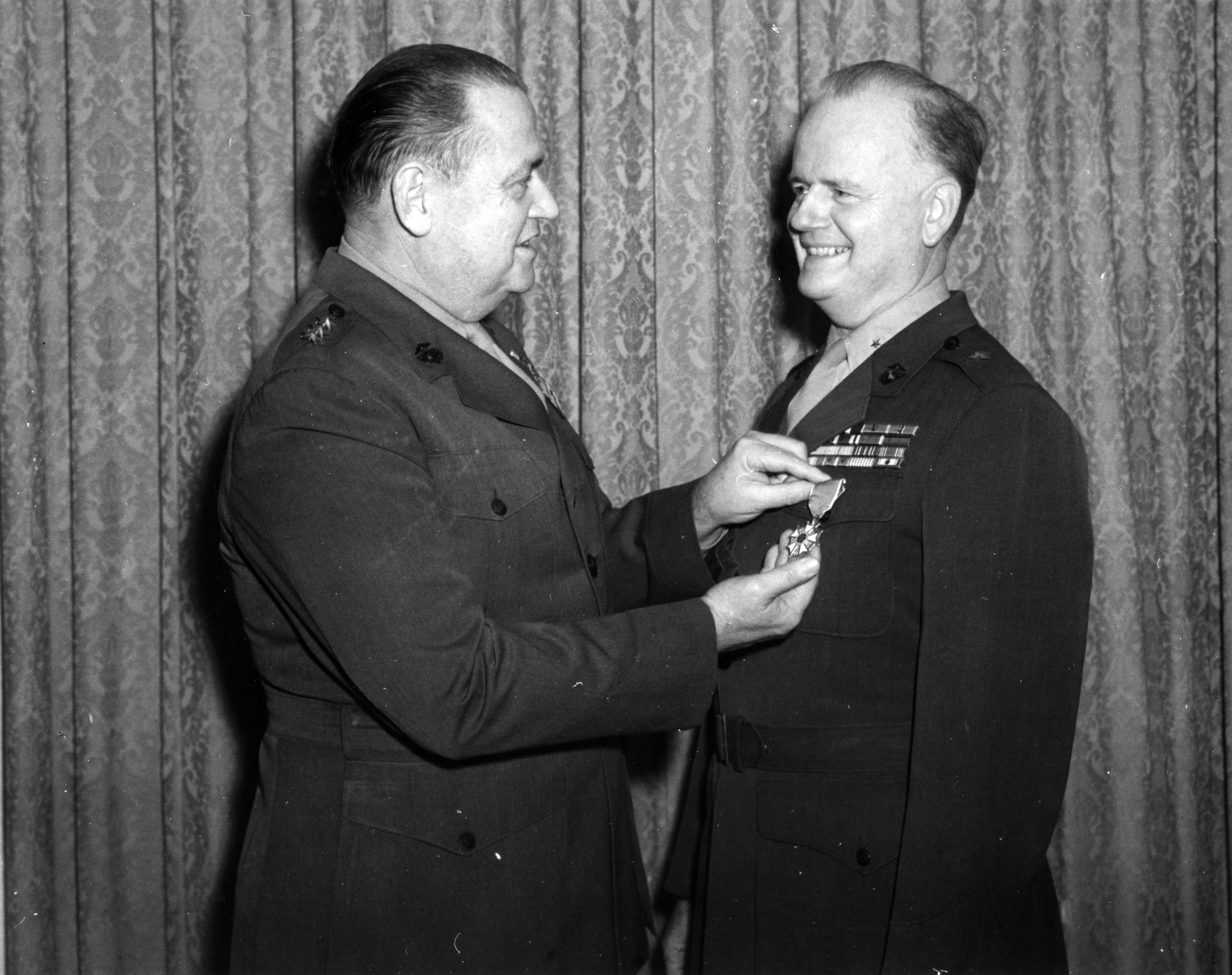
BGen Gayle (right) receives a Legion of Merit at his retirement ceremony from LTGen Henry W. Buse Jr., chief of staff, HQMC.

He graduated in July 1960 and departed for Japan, where he joined the headquarters, United States Forces Japan in Tokyo as deputy assistant chief of staff for operations (G-3) and remained in this capacity until September 1962. Gayle was then sent to Okinawa as commanding officer, 9th Marine Regiment, 3rd Marine Division. Gayle was transferred to the divisional staff in February 1963 and assumed duty as division's chief of staff under Major General Henry W. Buse Jr.

In August 1963, Gayle returned to the United States and joined again the staff of Marine Corps Schools, Quantico, under Lieutenant General Frederick L. Wieseman. He served as chairman, Long Range Study Panel which was tasked with future concepts development for the Marine Corps operational, organizational, logistical and Research and Development needs for 1985 and beyond. The resulting proposals called for better training and assignment guidelines for recruits, increased use of technology on the battlefield and the acquisition of vertical-takeoff-and-landing jets, which could operate without standard airfields. While in this capacity, he was promoted to the rank of brigadier general on January 1, 1964.

Gayle was ordered to Little Creek, Virginia on April 1, 1965, where he became commanding general, Landing Force Training Command, Atlantic. In this capacity, he was responsible for the amphibious training for troops of Atlantic Fleet; Fleet Marine Force, Atlantic and other units on the East Coast.

In February 1967, Gayle reported back to Headquarters Marine Corps and assumed his final duties as assistant chief of staff for operations (G-3) and deputy chief of staff for administration. He retired from active service on January 31, 1968, after 29 years of Marine Corps service and received his second Legion of Merit for his service at Headquarters Marine Corps.

== Retirement ==
Following his retirement from the military, Gayle settled in Washington, D.C., and worked for Center for Strategic and International Studies at Georgetown University for several years. He later taught calculus at Harker Preparatory School in Potomac, was a member of the Army-Navy Club, was active in the Marine Corps Historical Foundation; and was long an active member and later president of the board of trustees to the Marine Military Academy in Harlingen, Texas. During the latter months of his life, Gayle lived with his son Dr. Robert Gayle in Norfolk VA and later near his daughter Ms. Susan Gayle Needham in Farnham, Virginia. He died in Farnham of intracerebral hemorrhage on April 21, 2013.

Gayle is buried in Plot One Arlington National Cemetery, Virginia, near the old Ft. Myer Chapel, alongside his eldest son David Donald Gayle (died 1971). His wife, Katherine Louise Frank Gayle (1916–2004) is buried at the nearby Columbia Gardens Cemetery, also in Arlington. Gordon and Katherine had four children, David Donald Gayle (died 1971), Susan Louise Gayle Needham, Dr. Robert G. Gayle, M.D., and Michael A. Gayle

== Decorations ==
Here is the ribbon bar of Brigadier General Gayle:

1st Row	Navy Cross		Legion of Merit with Combat "V" and 5/16" Gold Star
2nd Row	Bronze Star Medal with Combat "V"	Navy and Marine Corps Commendation Medal with Combat "V"	Purple Heart
3rd Row	Navy Presidential Unit Citation with two stars	American Defense Service Medal	American Campaign Medal
4th Row	Asiatic-Pacific Campaign Medal with one 3/16 inch silver service star	World War II Victory Medal	National Defense Service Medal with one star
5th Row	Korean Service Medal with two 3/16 inch bronze service stars	United Nations Korea Medal	Republic of Korea Presidential Unit Citation
