= Harry Lee (Canadian football) =

Canadian football player

Profile
- Position: Centre

Personal information
- Born: January 27, 1932; Leeds, Alabama
- Died: March 24, 2019 (aged 87); Tuscaloosa, Alabama
- Listed height: 6 ft 2 in (1.88 m)
- Listed weight: 210 lb (95 kg)

Career history
- 1957: Hamilton Tiger-Cats

Harry C. Lee (January 27, 1932 – March 24, 2019) was an American professional football player who played for the Hamilton Tiger-Cats. He played college football at the University of Alabama. After his football career was ended by a shoulder injury, he was a financial adviser for Equitable Life Insurance Company in Tuscaloosa. Lee died in Tuscaloosa, Alabama on March 24, 2019, at the age of 87.
