= Ernie Cheatham =

American Marine Corps general and football player (1929–2014)

Ernest Clifford Cheatham Jr.
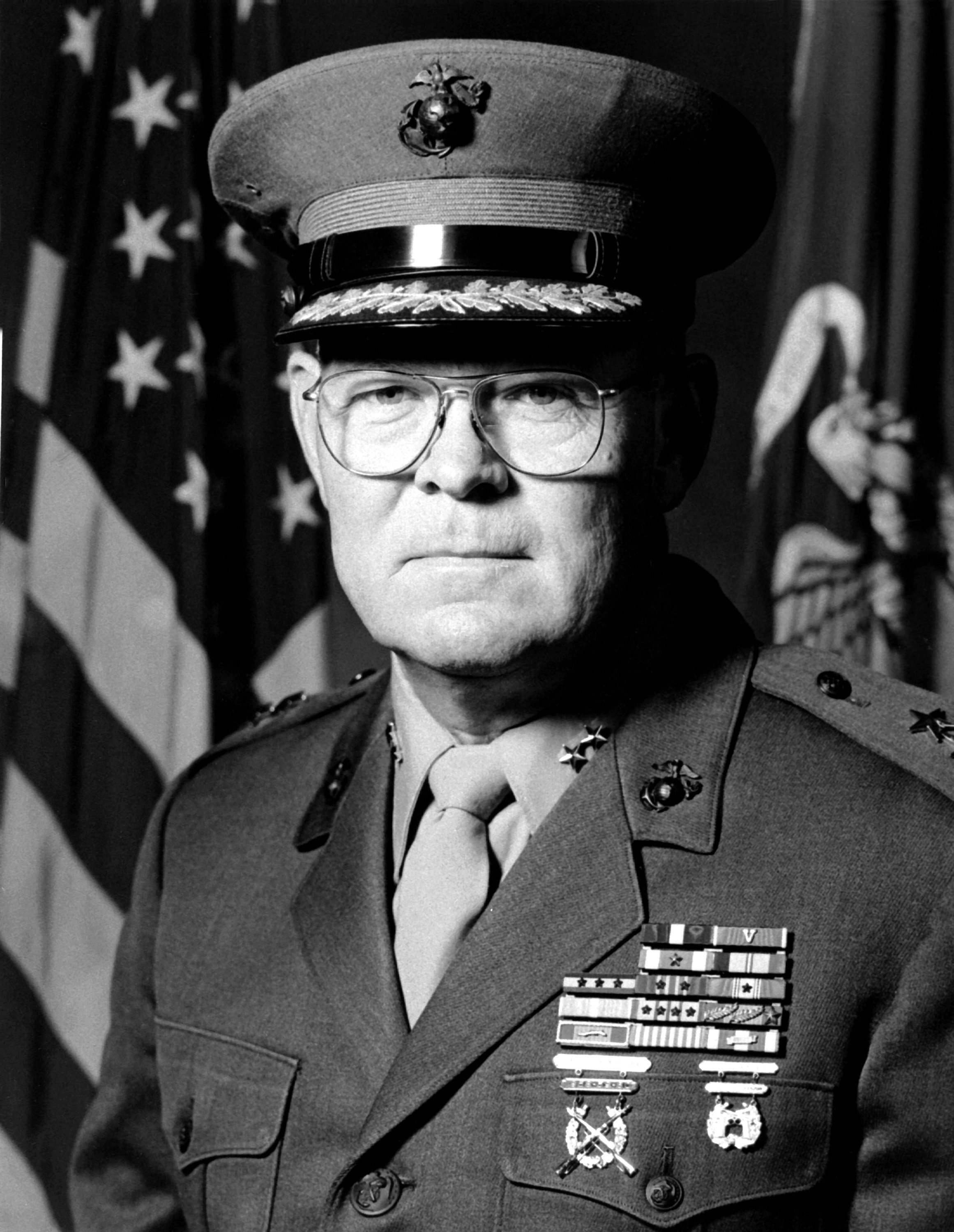
- Born: July 27, 1929; Long Beach, California, U.S.
- Died: June 14, 2014 (aged 84); Virginia Beach, Virginia, U.S.
- Burial place: Quantico National Cemetery
- Military career
- Allegiance: United States of America
- Branch: United States Marine Corps
- Service years: 1952–88
- Rank: Lieutenant General
- Nickname: Big Ernie
- Commands: 1st Marine Division; 1st Marine Amphibious Force; 4th Marine Amphibious Brigade; 2nd Battalion, 5th Marines
- Conflicts: Korean War; Vietnam War: Battle of Hue
- Awards: Navy Cross; Distinguished Service Medal; Silver Star; Legion of Merit

Ernie Cheatham
No. 79, 66
- Position: Defensive tackle

Personal information
- Listed height: 6 ft 4 in (1.93 m)
- Listed weight: 255 lb (116 kg)

Career information
- High school: St. Anthony High School
- College: Loyola Marymount
- NFL draft: 1951: 21st round, 248th overall pick

Career history
- Baltimore Colts (1954); Pittsburgh Steelers (1951–1954)

Career NFL statistics
- Games played: 6
- Stats at Pro Football Reference

Ernest Clifford Cheatham Jr. (July 27, 1929 – June 14, 2014) was a United States Marine Corps officer, a veteran of the Korean War and the Vietnam War, a recipient of the Navy Cross, and American football defensive tackle who played for the Baltimore Colts and the Pittsburgh Steelers.

== Early life and education ==
He was born on 27 July 1929 in Long Beach, California, the son of Ernest Clifford Cheatham, Sr. and Orissa Adams Cheatham.

== American Football Career ==
Cheatham played college football at Loyola Marymount University for the Loyola Marymount Lions team. After college, he was selected by the Pittsburgh Steelers with the 248th pick, round 21 of the 1951 NFL draft. Before playing in the NFL, Cheatham served in the United States Marine Corps during the Korean War. After the war, in 1954, he played a total of 6 games in his NFL career, 4 for the Steelers, and 2 for the Baltimore Colts.

== Military career ==
=== Korean War ===
Cheatham put his NFL career on hold to serve in the Marine Corps during the Korean War.

=== Vietnam War ===
Lt Col Cheatham served as commander of the 2nd Battalion, 5th Marines during the Vietnam War.

On 2 February 1968 Cheatham was at Phu Bai Combat Base when he was ordered into Huế to take command of his companies already engaged in the Battle of Hue. Before leaving for Huế, Cheatham reviewed Marine urban fighting doctrine which recommended staying off the streets and moving forward by blasting through walls and buildings. He proceeded to gather the necessary equipment including M20 Bazookas, M40 106mm recoilless rifles mounted on M274 Mules, C-4 explosive, flamethrowers, tear gas and gas masks. This equipment was loaded onto a convoy which arrived at the MACV Compound at 1 pm on 3 February, Cheatham then joined his company commanders in Huế University and they proceeded to develop the tactics to be used in recapturing southern Huế. Cheatham led his forces as they methodically cleared the Viet Cong and People's Army of Vietnam forces from the western area of southern Huế.

He was awarded the Navy Cross for his heroism leading 2/5 Marines during the battle. His Navy Cross citation reads:

"The President of the United States takes pleasure in presenting the Navy Cross to as Colonel [then Lieutenant Colonel] Ernest C. Cheatham, Jr. (MCSN: 0-58120), United States Marine Corps, for extraordinary heroism while serving as Commanding Officer of the Second Battalion, Fifth Marines, FIRST Marine Division (Reinforced)", Fleet Marine Force, in the Republic of Vietnam from 3 February to 3 March 1968.

"During Operation Hue City, Colonel Cheatham led his battalion in extremely heavy house-to-house fighting against a numerically superior North Vietnamese Army force. Advancing through the city on 4 February to assault the well-fortified Treasury Building/Post Office complex, his unit came under intense fire from concealed enemy positions. The enemy resistance halted the Marines' advance during two days of bitter fighting. Nevertheless, Colonel Cheatham remained steadfast in his determination to secure the enemy stronghold. Skillfully deploying a 106-mm. recoilless rifle squad into advantageous firing positions, he personally pinpointed the targets with M-16 tracer rounds and directed accurate fire on the enemy, which significantly reduced the pressure on his assaulting force. Completely disregarding his own safety, he joined the assaulting unit and aggressively led his men in routing the North Vietnamese from their entrenched positions. While proceeding through the city on 6 February, he organized his battalion for an assault on the enemy-held Provincial Headquarters Building. Ignoring the hostile fire all around him, he directed his men to covered positions while he fearlessly advanced to an exposed position from which he could locate the sources of enemy fire. Calling an M50 Ontos forward, he directed effective suppressive fire on the enemy and then courageously led his unit as it continued the assault. Colonel Cheatham's dynamic and heroic leadership and his unflagging example inspired all who observed him and contributed greatly to the defeat of the enemy and to their subsequent withdrawal from the city. His dauntless courage and unfaltering devotion to duty upheld the highest traditions of the Marine Corps and the United States Naval Service."

=== Post Vietnam ===
He was promoted to colonel in 1973 and brigadier general in 1977. He served as the commanding general, Landing Force Training Command, Atlantic and Commanding General, 4th Marine Amphibious Brigade.

He was promoted to major general in 1981 and on 13 August 1982 assumed command of the 1st Marine Division from MajGen James L. Day. He would command the division until 13 June 1985.

He served as the commanding general 1st Marine Amphibious Force, Camp Pendleton, California.

He was promoted to lieutenant general in June 1985 and served as deputy chief of staff for manpower at Headquarters Marine Corps until his retirement in January 1988. In 1987 Cheatham was considered as a potential successor to replace General Paul X. Kelley as Commandant of the Marine Corps; however, LtGen Alfred M. Gray Jr. was ultimately selected.

== See also ==
- List of Navy Cross recipients for the Vietnam War
- List of 1st Marine Division commanders

Military offices
Preceded by James L. Day	Commanding General of the 1st Marine Division; August 13, 1982 – June 13, 1985	Succeeded by Clyde D. Dean
