= Leeds, Alabama =

City in Alabama, United States

- City
- Seal
- Nickname: City of Valor
- Location of Leeds in Jefferson County and Shelby County and St. Clair County, Alabama.
- Coordinates: 33°32′44″N 86°33′27″W
- Country: United States
- State: Alabama
- Counties: Jefferson, St. Clair, Shelby
- Established: 1887
- Named for: Leeds, England

Government
  - Type: Mayor-Council Government
  - Mayor: Eddie Moore (N/A)

Area
  - Total: 22.99 sq mi (59.55 km^{2})
  - Land: 22.76 sq mi (58.95 km^{2})
  - Water: 0.23 sq mi (0.60 km^{2})
- Elevation: 673 ft (205 m)

Population (2020)
  - Total: 12,324
  - Density: 541.5/sq mi (209.07/km^{2})
- Time zone: UTC-6 (Central (CST))
  - Summer (DST): UTC-5 (CDT)
- ZIP Code: 35094
- Area codes: 205 & 659
- FIPS code: 01-41968
- GNIS feature ID: 2404905
- Website: leedsalabama.org

Leeds is a tricounty municipality in Jefferson, St. Clair, and Shelby counties in the U.S. state of Alabama; it is an eastern suburb of Birmingham. As of the 2020 census, its population was 12,324. It is one of four cities in the Birmingham area named after a British city, taking its name from Leeds, England.

Leeds was founded in 1877, during the final years of the post-Civil War Reconstruction Era. It housed the workers and their families of Lehigh, a Portland cement manufacturing plant.

Leeds is nicknamed "The City of Valor" because of three Congressional Medal of Honor recipients from World War II and the Korean War who called Leeds home: Alford McLaughlin, William Lawley and Henry "Red" Erwin.

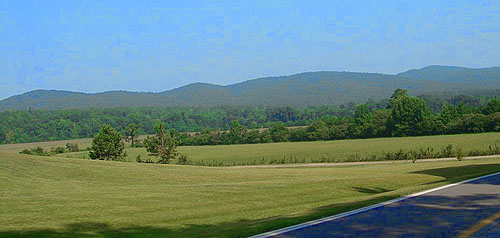
Panorama of the hills and mountains of Leeds, Alabama

== History ==
The War of 1812, geography, geology, and three cultures shaped the history of Leeds. Lying at the crossroads of ancient Native American paths in the center of Alabama, Leeds drew European settlers and their African-American slaves to a land of fertile growing seasons and rich sources of coal and mineral ore. The early settlers built churches and schools with many remaining in Cedar Grove, Oak Ridge, Ohanafeefee, and Mt. Pleasant. The principal survey of Leeds was entered into Jefferson County Map Book 10, page 21, in 1908. The settlement, dating to 1818 and incorporating on April 27, 1887 as "Leeds", has existed along the banks of the Little Cahaba River; beside an historic stagecoach route; and along two large railroads for the greater part of American history.

James Hamilton, a Scottish-Irish American veteran of the War of 1812 and first sheriff of Shelby County, settled in Cedar Grove in 1816. John Richard Ingram Pashal Stewart, a Cherokee English teacher and American veteran of the War of 1812, settled at Ohanafeefee Village around 1840. At Oak Ridge in 1820 or 1821, European settlers formed Shiloh Cumberland Presbyterian Church, the first CPC congregation in middle Alabama. By 1887, the original railroad pioneers included free African-American settlers who came to work at the Leeds cement plant and the Central of Georgia as the Georgia Pacific railroads. Some gravitated to historic Mt. Pleasant Church, where a handful of freed slaves had founded Scott City; Hillard Holley, Ciscero Davis, Jeff Harris, and Bill Johnson started Leeds Negro/Primary School in 1921.

Leeds Negro School which became Robert Russa Moton High School was in the Moton Park section of Leeds. It was named for Robert Russa Moton. After desegregation it was used as a junior high and in 2012 it became The Robert R. Moton Community Center.

Leeds is nicknamed "The City of Valor" because of three Congressional Medal of Honor recipients from World War II and the Korean War who called Leeds home: Alford McLaughlin, William Lawley and Henry "Red" Erwin. A wall in the Leeds Historical Society's Jonathan Bass House Museum is dedicated to the three men. In spring 2023, Chip Wise, the Leeds High School band director, composed an original piece titled City of Valor meant to honor the three Congressional Medal of Honor recipients. In October 2023, the Pearl Harbor National Memorial invited Wise and his marching band to perform the piece at Pearl Harbor on March 26, 2024.

== Government ==
Leeds, named after Leeds, Yorkshire, England was incorporated on April 27, 1887. The City of Leeds operates under a Mayor-Council form of government. The mayor, elected to a four-year term, heads the executive branch of city government. The current Mayor, David Miller, was elected to his 1st term, in October 2012, by almost a 2:1 margin. The city council members are also elected to four-year terms. Council members are elected to represent the city's five districts, and the mayor is elected at-large. The current five-member city council members are Sabrina Rose (District 1), Eric G. Turner (District 2), Cary Kennedy (District 3), Ryan Holtbrooks (District 4) and Dale Faulkner (District 5).

In 2023, Mayor Miller announced a new Downtown Leeds Revitalization Project with Alabama's Department of Transportation, ALDOT, which will develop new ADA compliant sidewalks and lighting throughout the city for the enjoyment of residents and tourists. ALDOT and federal funds will pay for 80% of the project, with the City providing the remaining 20%. The project will break ground in 2024.

== Folklore ==
The tale of John Henry was believed to have originated in Leeds. In this folk story, John Henry, the "steel-drivin' man", races and wins against a steam engine in the laying of railroad that penetrates the Oak Mountain Tunnel in Leeds. Retired chemistry professor and folklorist John Garst, of the University of Georgia, has argued that the contest happened at the Coosa Mountain Tunnel or the Oak Mountain Tunnel of the Columbus and Western Railway (now part of Norfolk Southern Railway) in Leeds on September 20, 1887.

Based on documentation that corresponds with the account of C.C. Spencer, who claimed in the 1920s to have witnessed the contest, Garst speculates that John Henry may have been a man named Henry who was born a slave to P.A.L. Dabney, the father of the chief engineer of that railroad, in 1850. Since 2007, the city of Leeds has honored John Henry's legend during an annual festival held on the third weekend in September, the Leeds Downtown Folk Festival and John Henry Celebration.

== Geography ==
Leeds is located primarily within Jefferson County.

According to the U.S. Census Bureau, the city has a total area of 22.5 square miles (58 km^{2}), of which 0.2 square miles (0.52 km^{2}) (0.67%) is covered by water.

The city is located east of Birmingham along Interstate 20, which runs north of the city. Access to the city is available from exits 140 and 144. Via I-20, downtown Birmingham is 18 mi (29 km) west, and Atlanta is east 129 mi (208 km). U.S. Route 411 begins in the city from its junction with U.S. Route 78. US 411 leads northeast 5 mi (8.0 km) to Moody.

In November 2019, the Alabama Political Reporter announced that the Superfund site at Interstate Lead Co. in Leeds was at risk due to flood hazards associated with climate change.

== Demographics ==
Historical population
Census	Pop.	Note	%±
1890	250		—
1910	810		—
1920	1,600		97.5%
1930	2,529		58.1%
1940	2,910		15.1%
1950	3,306		13.6%
1960	6,162		86.4%
1970	6,991		13.5%
1980	8,638		23.6%
1990	9,946		15.1%
2000	10,455		5.1%
2010	11,773		12.6%
2020	12,324		4.7%
2025 (est.)	12,831	▲	4.1%
U.S. Decennial Census

=== Racial and ethnic composition ===
Leeds city, Alabama – Racial and ethnic composition Note: the US Census treats Hispanic/Latino as an ethnic category. This table excludes Latinos from the racial categories and assigns them to a separate category. Hispanics/Latinos may be of any race.
Race / Ethnicity (NH = Non-Hispanic)	Pop 2000	Pop 2010	Pop 2020	% 2000	% 2010	% 2020
White alone (NH)	8,487	9,026	8,831	81.18%	76.67%	71.66%
Black or African American alone (NH)	1,658	1,683	1,887	15.86%	14.30%	15.31%
Native American or Alaska Native alone (NH)	36	29	31	0.34%	0.25%	0.25%
Asian alone (NH)	50	67	85	0.48%	0.57%	0.69%
Native Hawaiian or Pacific Islander alone (NH)	5	1	5	0.05%	0.01%	0.04%
Other race alone (NH)	4	12	57	0.04%	0.10%	0.46%
Mixed race or Multiracial (NH)	75	181	459	0.72%	1.54%	3.72%
Hispanic or Latino (any race)	140	774	969	1.34%	6.57%	7.86%
Total	10,455	11,773	12,324	100.00%	100.00%	100.00%

=== 2020 census ===
As of the 2020 census, 12,324 people, 4,964 households, and 3,388 families were residing in the city. The median age was 39.2 years. 23.1% of residents were under the age of 18, and 17.7% of residents were 65 years of age or older. For every 100 females there were 90.0 males, and for every 100 females age 18 and over there were 86.6 males age 18 and over.

86.8% of residents lived in urban areas, while 13.2% lived in rural areas.

There were 4,964 households in Leeds, of which 31.4% had children under the age of 18 living in them. Of all households, 47.2% were married-couple households, 16.8% were households with a male householder and no spouse or partner present, and 30.3% were households with a female householder and no spouse or partner present. About 26.5% of all households were made up of individuals, and 11.7% had someone living alone who was 65 years of age or older.

There were 5,348 housing units, of which 7.2% were vacant. The homeowner vacancy rate was 1.0% and the rental vacancy rate was 7.3%.

Racial composition as of the 2020 census
Race	Number	Percent
White	8,982	72.9%
Black or African American	1,907	15.5%
American Indian and Alaska Native	62	0.5%
Asian	85	0.7%
Native Hawaiian and Other Pacific Islander	5	0.0%
Some other race	572	4.6%
Two or more races	711	5.8%
Hispanic or Latino (of any race)	969	7.9%

=== 2010 census ===
As of the census of 2010, 11,773 people and 4,818 households lived in the city. The population density was 514.9 people per square mile. The 5,221 housing units had an average density of 205.2 per square mile. The racial makeup of the city was 78.7% White, 14.3% African American, 0.4% Native American, 0.6% Asian, 0.1% Pacific Islander, and 2.0% from two or more races. About 6.6% of the population was Hispanic or Latino of any race.

Of the 4,818 households, 21.9% had children under 18 living with them, 52% had a female householder with no husband present, and 30.5% were not families. about 14.8% had someone living alone who was 65 or older. The average household size was 2.48. In the city, the age distribution included 21.9% under 18 and 14.8% who were 65 years of age or older. The median income for a household in the city was $44,149. The per capita income for the city was $22,716. About 14.6% of the population was below the poverty line.

== Education ==
Leeds is served by the Leeds City School District.

In 2009, the City of Leeds Board of Education authorized the construction of two new schools: Leeds Middle School and Leeds High School. Construction began in 2009. The board also authorized the renovations of and additions to Leeds Elementary School, which began in 2008.

In 2013, Leeds Elementary School gained attention for asking parents for permission to administer corporal punishment to their children. Alabama is one of 19 states that allow corporal punishment in schools, and ranks third in the rate of students subjected to physical punishment.

Leeds Primary School was constructed in 2016 to house prekindergarten through second grade to ease overcrowding at its elementary school. The school opened that same year.

== Notable people ==
- Rebecca Bace, computer security expert in intrusion detection
- Charles Barkley, Basketball Hall of Famer
- Sam Star, RuPaul's Drag Race contestant
- Chandler Champion, Miss Alabama (2013)
- Henry E. Erwin, U.S. Army Air Forces, Medal of Honor recipient, World War II
- Kenneth L. Farmer, Jr., Army chief of staff, Medical Command
- Nathan Glick, artist and illustrator
- Caitlín R. Kiernan, author and paleontologist
- William R. Lawley, Jr., U.S. Army Air Forces, Medal of Honor recipient, World War II
- Harry Lee, former Canadian Football League player
- Mark Martin, cartoonist
- Alford L. McLaughlin, U.S. Marine Corps, Medal of Honor recipient, Korean War
- Harry Walker, Major League Baseball player and manager
- Dixie Walker (pitcher) (Ewart Gladstone Walker), Major League Baseball player
