= 2nd Battalion, 5th Marines =

2nd Battalion 5th Marines
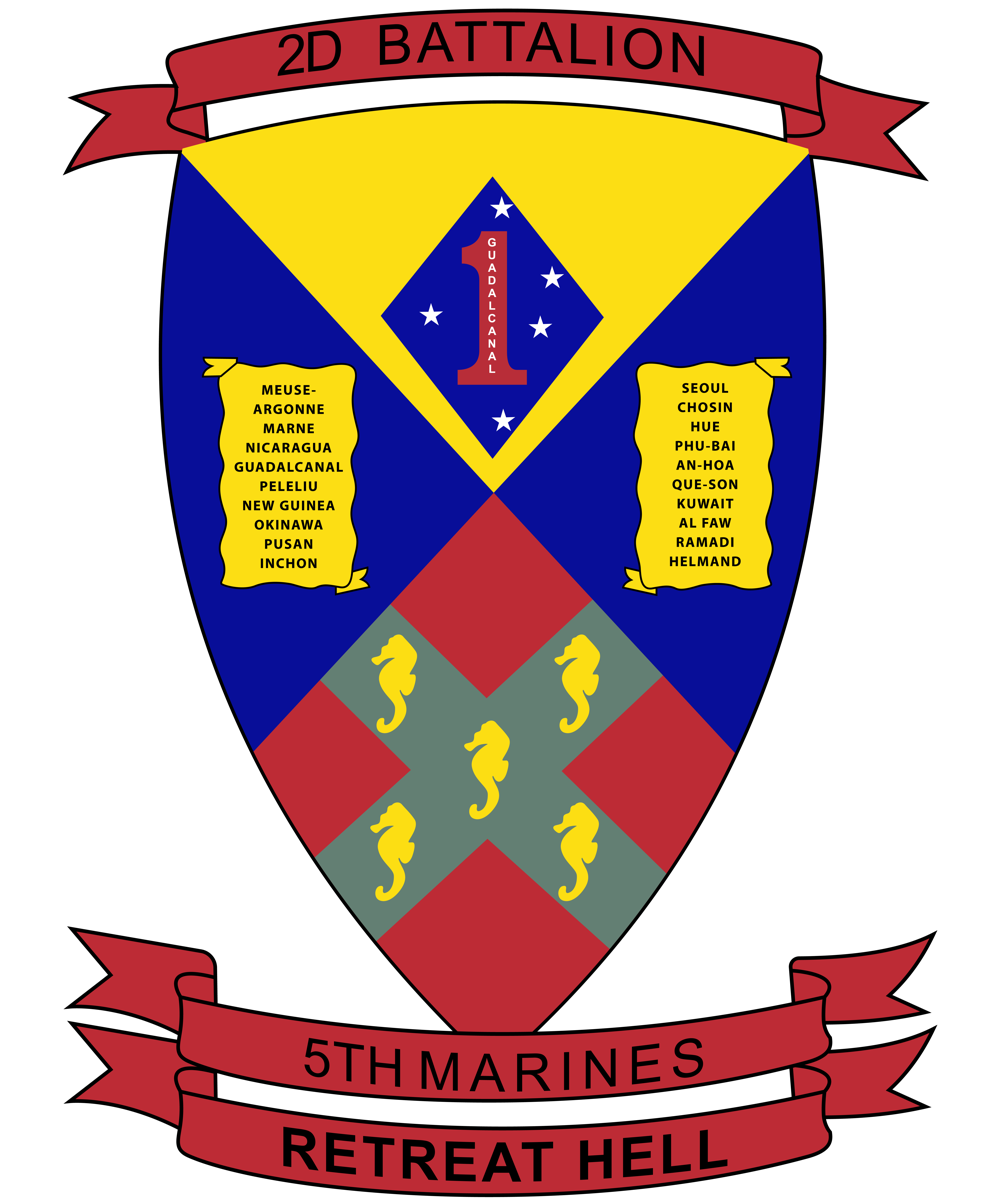
- 2/5's insignia
- Active: July 1, 1914 – August 13, 1919; May 17, 1921 – January 5, 1929; February 14, 1929 – April 12, 1930; September 1, 1934 – present
- Country: United States of America
- Branch: United States Marine Corps
- Type: Infantry battalion
- Role: Conducts expeditionary, combined-arms, and mechanized operations in order to support theater engagement plans and contingency operations
- Size: 1,200
- Part of: 5th Marine Regiment; 1st Marine Division
- Garrison/HQ: Marine Corps Base Camp Pendleton
- Nickname: The Bloodline
- Mottos: "Retreat, Hell"
- Engagements: World War I; Battle of Belleau Wood; Battle of Soissons; Battle of Blanc Mont Ridge; Meuse-Argonne Offensive; World War II; Guadalcanal Campaign; Battle of Cape Gloucester; Battle of Peleliu; Battle of Okinawa; Korean War; Battle of Pusan Perimeter; Battle of Inchon; Second Battle of Seoul; Battle of Chosin Reservoir; Battle of Hwacheon; Battle of the Punchbowl; Battle of Bunker Hill (1952); First Battle of the Hook; Battle for Outpost Vegas; Battle of the Samichon River; Vietnam War; Operation Union II; Battle of Hue; Nicaraguan Revolution; Operation Golden Pheasant; Operation Desert Storm; War on terror; Iraq War; Battle of Donkey Island; Operation Enduring Freedom; Operation Inherent Resolve

Commanders
- Current commander: Lt.Col B.D. Coleman
- Notable commanders: William J. Whaling; Harold E. Rosecrans; Gordon D. Gayle; Lewis W. Walt; Ernie Cheatham

2nd Battalion 5th Marines (2/5 or "Two Five") is an infantry battalion in the United States Marine Corps consisting of approximately 800 marines and sailors. They are based out of Marine Corps Base Camp Pendleton, California and fall under the command of the 5th Marine Regiment and the 1st Marine Division. The battalion has seen combat in World War I, World War II, the Korean War, the Vietnam War and the Gulf War and has deployed many times in support of Operation Iraqi Freedom and the war on terror.

2/5 is the most highly decorated battalion in the Marine Corps, and their motto, "Retreat, Hell!", comes from the French trenches of World War I, when a Marine officer named Lloyd W. Williams was advised by a French officer to retreat and replied, "Retreat? Hell, we just got here!"

== Subordinate units ==
- Headquarters and Services Company
- Echo Company
- Fox Company
- Golf Company
- Hotel Company
- Weapons Company

== History ==
=== Early history ===
2nd Battalion 5th Marines was formed on July 1, 1914, and immediately sailed to the Caribbean to quell political turmoil in the Dominican Republic and Haiti. In June 1917, as part of the United States' entry into World War I, the battalion sailed for France with the rest of the 5th Marine Regiment and the American Expeditionary Force. At the time the battalion was composed of four companies; the 18th, 43rd, 51st and 55th. They fought during the Battle of Belleau Wood, Soissons, and the Meuse-Argonne campaign and were twice awarded the French Croix de Guerre with Palm. To this day, members of the battalion wear the French Fourragère representing this award. Following the armistice of 1918, 2nd Battalion, 5th Marines was assigned to occupation duties in Germany until their return to Quantico, Virginia, in August 1919.

=== Interwar years ===
Beginning in 1920, the battalion began guarding US Mail trains throughout the United States. In 1927, the battalion was sent to Nicaragua to fight bandits and to supervise the 1928 Nicaraguan national elections.

=== World War II ===
In 1941, the battalion joined the newly formed 1st Marine Division at New River, North Carolina, but later relocated to the west coast of the United States. During World War II the battalion fought in the Battle of Guadalcanal, Battle of Cape Gloucester, Battle of Peleliu, and the Battle of Okinawa. Following the Japanese surrender, the battalion was assigned to occupation duty in Northern China until 1947, at which time they returned to the United States.

=== Korean War ===
Immediately following the 1950 North Korean invasion of South Korea, 2d Battalion, 5th Marines sailed from Camp Pendleton, California, to defend the Pusan Perimeter as a part of the famous "Fire Brigade". The battalion also participated in the landing at Inchon, the liberation of Seoul, the Chosin Reservoir Campaign, and the defense of the East, Central, and Western Fronts before the war was over. From July 1953 to February 1955, 2d Battalion, 5th Marines assisted in the defense of the Korean Demilitarized Zone, after which they again returned to Camp Pendleton.

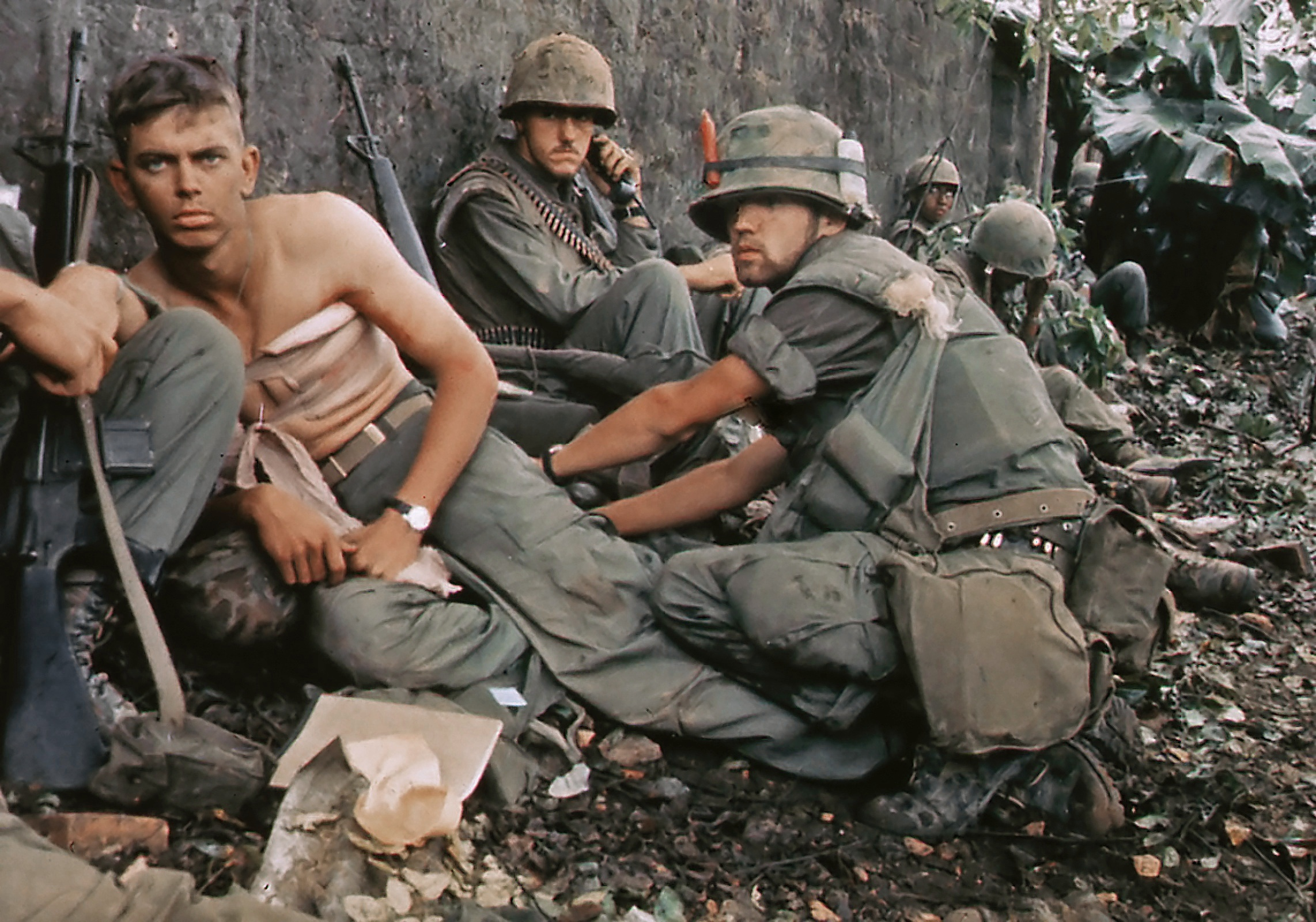
PFC D. A. Crum of H/2/5 is treated for wounds during operations in Hue City.

=== Vietnam War ===
In April 1966, the battalion deployed to the Republic of Vietnam and served there until 1971. During this time, 2d Battalion, 5th Marines participated in combat operations at Huế, Quế Sơn, Phu Bai, Đông Hà and Phú Lộc. Immediately after their return to Camp Pendleton in 1971, the battalion joined Operation New Arrivals, the relocation of Southeast Asian refugees to the United States.

=== 1980s and 1990s ===
For the next fifteen years, the battalion deployed regularly as part of the Marine Corps' Unit Deployment Program. In December 1990, 2nd Battalion, 5th Marines sailed for the Persian Gulf in support of Operations Desert Shield / Desert Storm. They were staged in Saudi Arabia and participated in the liberation of Kuwait. During the return transit to the United States, the battalion was diverted to Bangladesh where it provided humanitarian relief as part of Operation Sea Angel.

In 1994, 2d Battalion, 5th Marines deployed as the ground combat element of the 11th Marine Expeditionary Unit and participated in Operation Distant Runner, the Non-combatant evacuation operation (NEO) of Rwanda and Operation Restore Hope and Operation Quick Draw in Somalia. In 1999, the battalion began regular deployments to Okinawa for service as the Battalion Landing Team for the 31st Marine Expeditionary Unit. The battalion also participated in several operations in East Timor.

=== War on terror ===
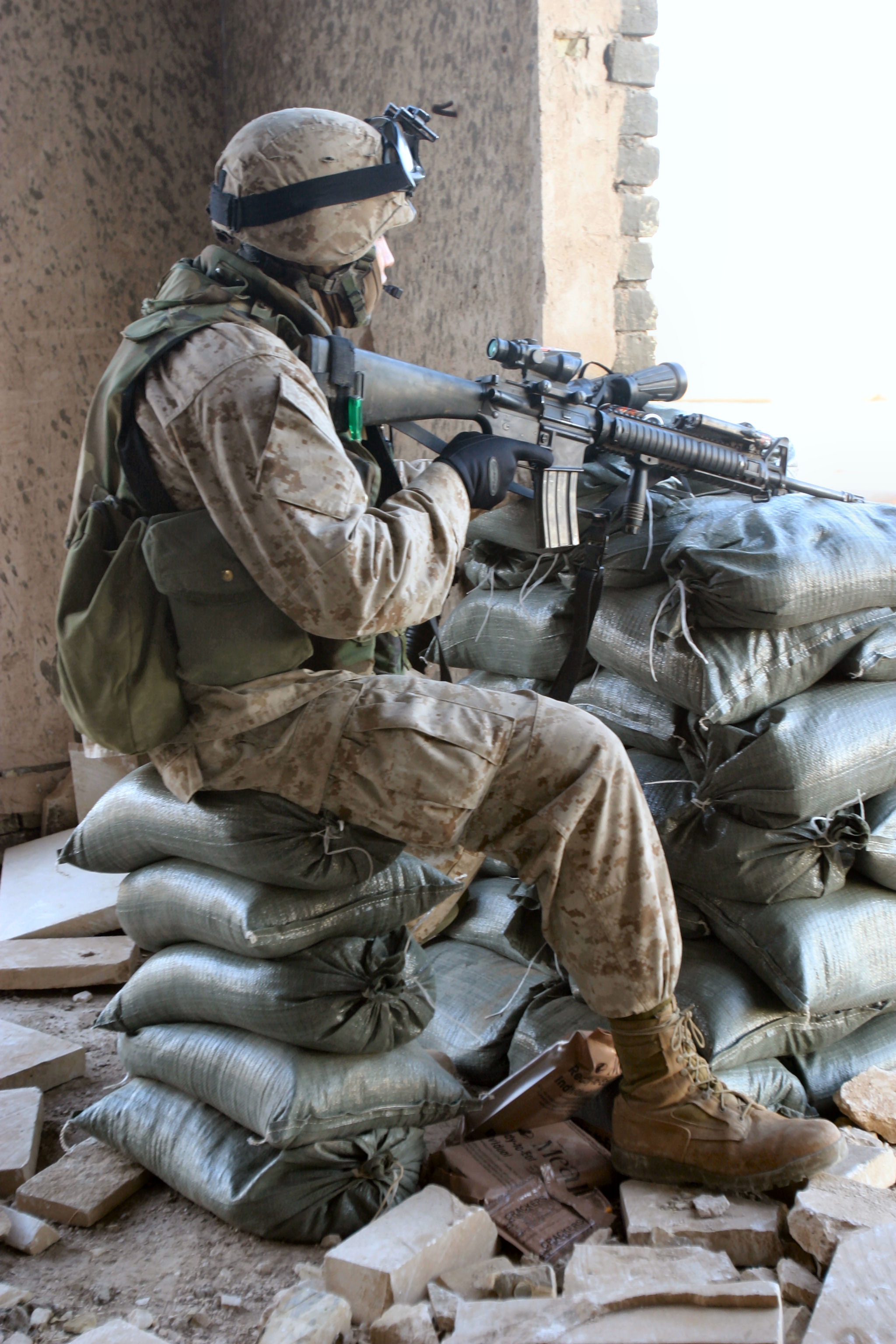
A Marine of F/2/5 stands watch in Ramadi, Iraq in February 2005

On February 2, 2003, 2/5 left MCB Camp Pendleton for Kuwait where they staged prior to the beginning of the war in Iraq. On March 20, 2003, at approximately 2:30 am local time 2/5, as an element of the 15th Marine Expeditionary Unit, commenced operations in Iraq with the start of the Battle of Al Faw. For this operation they were attached with Royal Marines from the 3 Commando Brigade crossing into Iraq the first night of the invasion. The initial objective was to secure to Rumalia Oilfields. Upon completing the seizure of this objective, 2/5 attacked north and got as far as Samarra before the end of the initial combat phase of the Iraq War. They then conducted security and stabilization operations (SASO) in Samawah, Iraq. Relieved by the 1st bn of the Royal Netherlands Marine Corps (who were soon augmented by Japanese forces acting in a strictly non-combat role), 2/5 returned to Camp Pendelton in August.

In September 2004 2/5 returned to Iraq where it was stationed in Ramadi, a hotbed of insurgent activity 30 miles (48 km) west of Fallujah and 60 miles (97 km) west of Baghdad. During this deployment 2/5 lost 15 Marines killed in action, 10 from Weapons Company. Elements from 2/5 began returning to Camp Pendleton on Easter, 2005.

From December 2005 to July 2006, 2/5 was deployed to Okinawa as part of the 31st Marine Expeditionary Unit. They participated in several humanitarian operations on Jolo Island and landslide recovery in Southern Leyte in the Philippines.

In March 2007, 2/5 was deployed to Iraq for the third time, stationed again in Ramadi. While deployed to Ramadi, Golf Company was unexpectedly tasked with operations in the city of Karmah.

In April 2008, 2/5 deployed as a Battalion Landing Team as part of the 15th Marine Expeditionary Unit. BLT 2/5 made stops in Singapore, Bahrain, Qatar, United Arab Emirates, Kuwait, Jordan, and Australia.

In September 2009, 2/5 deployed as a Battalion Landing Team (BLT) as part of the 31st Marine Expeditionary Unit (MEU). BLT 2/5 relieved their sister battalion BLT 3rd battalion 5th Marines. The MEU deployed for its fall patrol in a small deck ARG configuration aboard the USS Denver, USS Tortuga and USS Harpers Ferry. The MEU had started its Certification Exercise (CERTEX) when it was redirected to the scene of several natural disasters in the Republic of the Philippines and Indonesia. With the relief effort complete, the MEU transitioned to PHIBLEX and conducted bilateral training with the Philippine Armed Forces. Additionally, the Japanese Self Defense Force (JSDF) and Co. G, BLT 2/5 conducted Exercise Forest Light 2010 at Sekiyama, Japan. The two nations conducted live fire ranges including mortars, Combat Marksmanship Program (CMP), machinegun ranges and helicopter-borne operations. 2/5 returned to Camp Pendleton in April 2010.

In January 2011, 2/5 was again designated as a Battalion Landing Team (BLT) as part of the 31st MEU. 2/5 relieved BLT 1/7. 2/5 conducted bilateral training with the Thai Marines, and Cambodian Self Defense Forces. Following a brief port visit in Malaysia a devastating earthquake and subsequent tsunami struck northern Japan in vicinity of the city of Sendai. 2/5 was immediately recalled and directed to support Operation Tomodachi, the American Humanitarian and Disaster relief (HADR) efforts following the natural disaster. Most notably Golf Co 2/5 conducted operations ashore on Oshima Island, a small island off of the western coast of Japan in the Miyagi Prefecture. They were tasked with facilitating the reopening of Uranohama Port, the main life line to the Japanese mainland. BLT 2/5 was relieved by BLT 2/7 and returned to Camp Pendleton in June 2011.

In February 2012, 2/5 deployed for the first time to Helmand province, Afghanistan, in support of Operation Enduring Freedom. 2/5 was a part of Regimental Combat Team 6 (RCT-6) and served as the ground combat element of Regional Command Southwest. The Marines serving with the battalion worked in partnership with the Afghan National Security Forces, helping the Afghan army and police provide security services to the Afghan people and smothering insurgent activity. The battalion was assigned to cover Now Zad and Musa Qala districts in northern Helmand province, and all cities and villages that lied in between. During the deployment, the battalion executed a 17-day operation in a village that was a Taliban stronghold between Now Zad and Musa Qala, dubbed Operation Branding Iron. Tragically during the deployment, the battalion lost four Marines to combat action: Sgt. Wade Wilson, who was awarded the Silver Star, Cpl. Anthony Servin, Cpl. Alex Martinez, and Lance Cpl. Joshua Witsman. The battalion returned to Camp Pendleton in September 2012.

=== National Geographic Channel Documentary ===
During Operation Branding Iron, camera crews from the National Geographic Channel were imbedded with 2/5, documenting the battalion's actions during that operation, which they conducted while other USMC units were in the process of withdrawing from the theater of operations. The film, entitled Battleground Afghanistan, is a 5 episode documentary that chronicled the role of Golf company, 2nd battalion, 5th Marines. The five episodes chronicle the company's actions preparing for and conducting Operation Branding Iron, the subsequent events, daily life in camp, their preparations to go home at the end of their deployment, and finally their return to the US. The documentary includes one-on-one on camera interviews with Golf company's commander, Capt. Ben Middendorf, as well as numerous other Marines in Golf company. (Capt. Middendorf was awarded that year's, 2012, prestigious LtCol William G. Leftwich, Jr. Trophy for Outstanding Leadership for his actions while deployed with Golf Co., 2d Battalion, Fifth Marine Regiment, in the Helmand province of Afghanistan. This award if given to the “best captain” in the Marine Corps to have participated in infantry combat. ) During their 17-day operation shown in the documentary, and during their last short mission right at the end of the documentary before they prepare to head home, Golf company did not lose a single Marine. As of 2014, the entire documentary is available for streaming on Netflix.

== Medal of Honor recipients ==
=== World War II ===
- Robert E. Bush and William D. Halyburton, Jr., both Corpsmen, were awarded the Medal of Honor as a result of their heroic actions while assigned to 2/5.

=== Korean War ===
- Private First Class Robert E. Simanek, while serving with Company F, 2/5, was awarded the Medal of Honor for his act of valor on August 17, 1952, in which he threw himself on a grenade to save the lives of fellow Marines. PFC Simanek survived and received the Medal of Honor from President Dwight D. Eisenhower.
- Duane E. Dewey

=== Vietnam War ===
- Captain James A. Graham, a member of Company F, 2/5, was killed in action in Vietnam during Operation Union II. For his heroic actions on June 2, 1967, he was awarded the Medal of Honor.
- On July 4, 1967, PFC Melvin E. Newlin single-handedly broke up and disorganized an entire enemy assault force. In the course of his actions, he was mortally wounded. He was posthumously awarded the Medal of Honor for his actions.
- Staff Sergeant Allan J. Kellogg, platoon sergeant for Company G, 2/5, was awarded the Medal of Honor for his actions on March 11, 1970, in Quang Nam province, Republic of Vietnam.

== Notable former members ==
- Ernie Cheatham, battalion commander during the Battle of Huế in the Vietnam War
- George R. Christmas, company commander during the Battle of Huế in the Vietnam War
- Major Lloyd W. Williams. A famous saying is attributed to Williams, who was serving as a company commander in the 5th Marines during the Battle of Belleau Wood. When advised to withdraw by a French officer at the defensive line just north of the village of Lucy-le-Bocage on June 1, 1918, he is said to have replied: "Retreat? Hell, we just got here!" Captain Williams would not survive the ensuing battle, and was posthumously promoted to major and recommended for the Distinguished Service Cross.
- Brigadier general Gordon D. Gayle, commanded the battalion on New Britain and Peleliu.
- Former Chairman of the Joint Chiefs of Staff, General Peter Pace was commander of 2nd Plt, G Co, 2/5 during the Vietnam War.
- Brigadier general Lester A. Dessez, commanded 18th Company in 1922.
- Willard Keith, G Company during World War II
- Sergeant Reckless, Korean Warhorse

== In popular culture ==
- Marines from 2/5 were used as extras for the amphibious landing during the Battle of Saipan in the movie "Hell to Eternity."
- The 1987 film Full Metal Jacket portrays the Marines of Hotel Company 2/5 during the Battle of Hue.
- The W.E.B. Griffin novel series The Corps featured Marines from 2/5 and their actions during the Battle of Guadalcanal.
- The 2011 film Battle: Los Angeles portrays the Marines of Echo Company, 2/5 in a fictional battle inspired by the 1942 events.
- The 2019 film Ip Man 4: The Finale portrays Marines of 2/5 learning martial arts training.

== See also ==
- List of United States Marine Corps battalions
- Organization of the United States Marine Corps
