= Leeds City Schools =

School district in Leeds, Alabama, United States

Location
- 1404 Eighth Street/P.O. Box 1029 Leeds, Alabama 35905 United States

District information
- Type: Public
- Motto: Promoting achievement, respect, and success
- Grades: K–12
- Superintendent: John Moore
- Schools: 4
- Budget: $16.6 million
- NCES District ID: 0100011

Students and staff
- Students: 1,913
- Teachers: 94
- Staff: 80

Other information
- Website: http://www.leedsk12.org/

Leeds City Schools is the school district of Leeds, Alabama.

The district states that unless a parent of a child informs the school principal on an annual basis, the district will perform corporal punishment on a student if the student commits certain infractions.

== Schools ==
- Leeds Primary School
- Leeds Elementary School
- Leeds Middle School
- Leeds High School
