= Alford L. McLaughlin =

Alford Lee McLaughlin
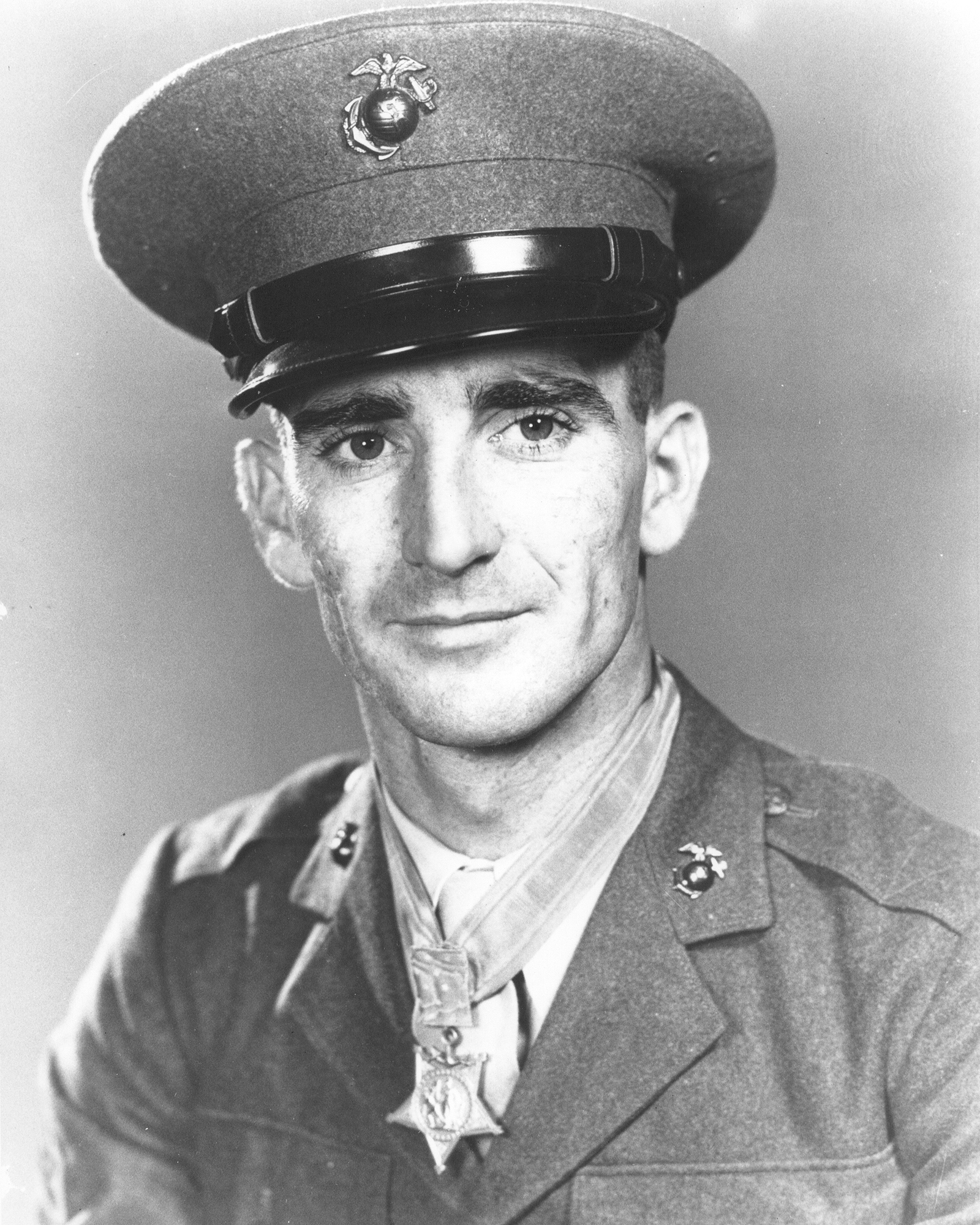
- Born: March 28, 1928; Leeds, Alabama
- Died: January 14, 1977 (aged 48); Leeds, Alabama
- Burial place: Mount Hebron Cemetery, Leeds, Alabama
- Military career
- Allegiance: United States
- Branch: United States Marine Corps
- Service years: 1945–1972
- Rank: Master Sergeant
- Units: I Company, 3rd Battalion, 5th Marine Regiment, 1st Marine Division
- Conflicts: World War II; Korean War: Battle of Bunker Hill
- Awards: Medal of Honor; Purple Heart (2)

Alford Lee McLaughlin (March 28, 1928 – January 14, 1977) was a United States Marine Corps master sergeant and the 33rd Marine to receive the Medal of Honor for heroism in the Korean War. He earned the nation's highest decoration for valor during the Battle of Bunker Hill by his two-machine gun defense at one of the outposts in the Bunker Hill area of Korea on the night of September 4–5, 1952. He was presented the medal by President Dwight D. Eisenhower on October 27, 1953, at a ceremony in the White House.

A private first class at the time, McLaughlin fired two machine guns alternately, notwithstanding his painful wounds and blistered hands, until the weapons became too hot to hold. He continued firing with a carbine and threw hand grenades until some 200 Chinese soldiers lay dead or wounded in front of him. In addition to the Medal of Honor, McLaughlin was awarded a Purple Heart for wounds received during that action. He was also awarded a Purple Heart for wounds received on August 16, 1952, in the same sector.

== Biography ==
Born on March 18, 1928, in Leeds, Alabama, Alford Lee McLaughlin attended school in Leeds until 1944 and then enlisted in the United States Marine Corps on May 3, 1945. After completing recruit training at Parris Island South Carolina, he served at Camp Lejeune, North Carolina, until embarking for Guam in November 1945. From Guam he was ordered to Japan in March 1946, serving in the occupation of that country until August 1947. He then served with the 4th Marines, participating in Caribbean maneuvers from January to March 1948, and again from February to March 1949. He served in the Mediterranean from September 1948 to January 1949.

Private First Class McLaughlin was assigned to the Marine Detachment at the U.S. Naval Disciplinary Barracks, Portsmouth, New Hampshire, from June 1949 until September 1951. He was next assigned to Camp Pendleton, California, for further training before leaving for Korea in February 1952. He fought in the second Korean winter, the summer-fall defense of 1952, and in the third Korean winter before he left Korea in January 1953.

McLaughlin then served as a military policeman at Camp Lejeune, North Carolina, until July 1953, when he was assigned as a mortar unit leader with the 4th Marine Corps Reserve Rifle Company at Rome, Georgia. He was later assigned to the 10th Marines, Camp Lejeune, and retired from the Marine Corps in 1972 as a master sergeant.

McLaughlin died on January 14, 1977, and was buried in Mount Hebron Cemetery, in Leeds, Alabama. McLaughlin was one of three Medal of Honor recipients to come from Leeds, Alabama, the other two being William R. Lawley Jr. and Henry E. Erwin.

== Medal of Honor citation ==
The President of the United States in the name of The Congress takes pleasure in presenting the MEDAL OF HONOR to PRIVATE FIRST CLASS ALFORD L. MCLAUGHLIN
UNITED STATES MARINE CORPS for service as set forth in the following

CITATION:

For conspicuous gallantry and intrepidity at the risk of his life above and beyond the call of duty while serving as a Machine Gunner of Company I, Third Battalion, Fifth Marines, First Marine Division (Reinforced), in action against enemy aggressor forces in Korea on the night of 4–5 September 1952. Volunteering for his second continuous tour of duty on a strategic combat outpost far in advance of the main line of resistance, Private First Class McLaughlin, although operating under a barrage of enemy artillery and mortar fire, set up plans for the defense of his platoon which proved decisive in the successful defense of the outpost. When hostile forces attacked in battalion strength during the night, he maintained a constant flow of devastating fire upon the enemy, alternating employing two machine guns, a carbine and hand grenades. Although painfully wounded, he bravely fired the machine guns from the hip until his hands became blistered by the extreme heat from the weapons and, placing the guns on the ground to allow them to cool continued to defend the position with his carbine and grenades. Standing up in full view, he shouted words of encouragement to his comrades above the din of battle and, throughout a series of fanatical enemy attacks, sprayed the surrounding area with deadly fire accounting for an estimated one hundred and fifty enemy dead and fifty wounded. By his indomitable courage, superb leadership and valiant fighting spirit in the face of overwhelming odds, Private First Class McLaughlin served to inspire his fellow Marines in their gallant stand against the enemy and was directly instrumental in preventing the vital outpost from falling into the hands of a determined and numerically superior hostile force. His outstanding heroism and unwavering devotion to duty reflect the highest credit upon himself and enhance the finest traditions of the United States Naval Service.

/S/ DWIGHT D. EISENHOWER

== Awards and Decorations ==
Master Sergeant McLaughlin received the following awards for his service.

1st row	Medal of Honor		
2nd row	Purple Heart with 5/16 inch star	Combat Action Ribbon Retroactively Awarded, 1999	Navy Presidential Unit Citation with 1 Service star
3rd row	Navy Unit Commendation	Marine Corps Good Conduct Medal with 4 Service stars	American Campaign Medal
4th row	Asiatic-Pacific Campaign Medal	World War II Victory Medal	Navy Occupation Service Medal with 'Asia' clasp
5th row	National Defense Service Medal with 1 Service star	Korean Service Medal with 2 Campaign stars	Vietnam Service Medal with 2 Campaign stars
6th row	Korean Presidential Unit Citation	RVN Gallantry Cross Unit Citation with Palm	RVN Civil Actions Unit Citation 1st class
7th row	United Nations Service Medal Korea	Vietnam Campaign Medal	Korean War Service Medal Retroactively Awarded, 2003

== See also ==
- List of Korean War Medal of Honor recipients
