= St. Clair County School District =

School district in Alabama, United States

Address
- 410 Roy Drive, Ashville, AL 35953 United States, Alabama
- Coordinates: 33.8201092°N 86.2711382°W

District information
- Grades: PreK–12
- Superintendent: Rusty St. John
- Schools: 20

Other information
- Website: www.sccboe.org

St Clair County School District is a school district in St. Clair County, Alabama consisting of 20 schools, including four high schools, twelve elementary and middle schools, a PreK–12 school, and three special schools.

== School board ==
- Nickie Stevens VanPelt – District 1 (At Large)
- Mike Hobbs – District 2 (Springville)
- Marie Manning – District 3 (Ragland)
- Bill Morris – District 4 (At Large)
- Scott Suttle – District 5 (Moody), President
- Allison Gray – District 6 (Odenville)
- Randy Thompson – District 7 (Ashville)

== Schools ==
Ashville schools

- Ashville Elementary School (PreK–4)
- Ashville Middle School (5–8)
- Ashville High School (9–12)

Margaret schools

- Margaret Elementary School (PreK–5)

Moody schools

- Moody Elementary School (PreK–3)
- Moody Middle School (4–6)
- Moody Junior High School (7–8)
- Moody High School (9–12)

Odenville schools

- Odenville Elementary School (PreK–2)
- Odenville Intermediate School (3–5)
- Odenville Middle School (6–8)
- Saint Clair County High School (9–12)

Ragland schools

- Ragland School (PreK–12)

Springville schools

- Springville Elementary School (PreK–5)
- Springville Middle School (6–8)
- Springville High School (9–12)

Steele schools

- Steele Junior High School (PreK–8)

System-wide schools

- Ruben Yancy Alternative School
- John Pope Eden Career Tech Center
- Virtual Preparatory Academy (K–12)
