= Springville High School (Alabama) =

Location
- 8295 US Highway 11; Springville, Alabama 35146; United States
- 33°47′03″N 86°26′27″W

Information
- Type: Public high school
- Established: 1861 (165 years ago) Current Location 2008 (18 years ago)
- School district: St. Clair County School System
- NCES District ID: 0103062
- NCES School ID: 010306201377
- Principal: Madelyn Cave
- Teaching staff: 36.70 (FTE)
- Grades: 9–12
- Enrollment: 734 (2023-2024)
- Student to teacher ratio: 20.00
- Campus type: Rural
- Colors: Purple, Gold, White
- Athletics: AHSSA Class 5A
- Nickname: Tigers
- Rival: Saint Clair County High School
- Accreditation: AdvancED
- Newspaper: The Roar
- Feeder schools: Springville Middle School
- Website: shs.sccboe.org

Springville High School (SHS) is a four-year public high school in Springville, Alabama. It is one of five high schools in the St. Clair County School System.

Springville High School's community outreach efforts have been anchored by its Key Club and Beta Club, both of which collectively include hundreds of students as members. The Key Club and the school's fishing team, the Springville Anglers, have won state-level competitions. The visual arts department's annual art show, as well as the school's partnership with the Youth Leadership Development Program, offers students opportunities for scholarships.

== Academics ==
=== Enrollment ===
As of the 2018–2019 school year, Springville High School had an enrollment of 744 students and 18.74 classroom teachers (FTE basis), resulting in a student-teacher ratio of 18.74. The student population had an ethnic make-up with 89% white, 6% African American, and Hispanics, Native Americans, Asians, and multi-race each comprising less than 1%. 144 students (19.4%) qualified for free lunch and 26 students (3.5%) qualified for reduced-price lunch.

=== Programs ===
Springville High School offers standard, dual enrollment, pre-AP, and AP courses. Included in its 2019-2020 curriculum catalog were six dual enrollment courses, eleven pre-AP courses, and the following AP classes: AP Biology, AP Calculus AB, AP Chemistry, AP English Language and Composition, AP English Literature and Composition, AP Physics 1, AP Environmental Science, AP Statistics, AP United States Government and Politics, and AP United States History. With the 2016–2017 school year marking the first AP course offerings, Springville High School has seen a 253% jump in students' earning qualifying AP exam scores from then to 2020 (and a 19% increase from 2019).

Springville High School offers an extensive curriculum in visual and performing arts. Its marching band, the Might Band from Tiger Land, earned all super ratings and was designated "Best Class Band" in a local competition in 2019.

Seniors, juniors, and select sophomores have the opportunity to participate in programs offered by the Eden Career Technical Center, also a part of the St. Clair County School System. As of the 2019–2020 school year, these programs were in automotive service, building construction, business/marketing/multimedia, collision repair, cooperative education, cosmetology, culinary arts, early childhood development, EMT, fire science, health science/technology, HVAC, information technology, JROTC, and welding.

== Athletics ==
=== Baseball ===
From the 2011-2012 to the 2014-2015 school year, Springville Baseball was led by first overall MLB draft pick Casey Mize who amassed a record of 19-2 while at the school.

- Basketball
- Cheerleading
- Cross Country
- Football
- Golf
- Soccer

=== Softball ===
Springville Softball won the AHSSA State Championship for the 2015, 2016, 2017, and 2018 seasons.

- Tennis
- Volleyball
- Wrestling
