= Robert E. Simanek =

American Marine (1930–2022)

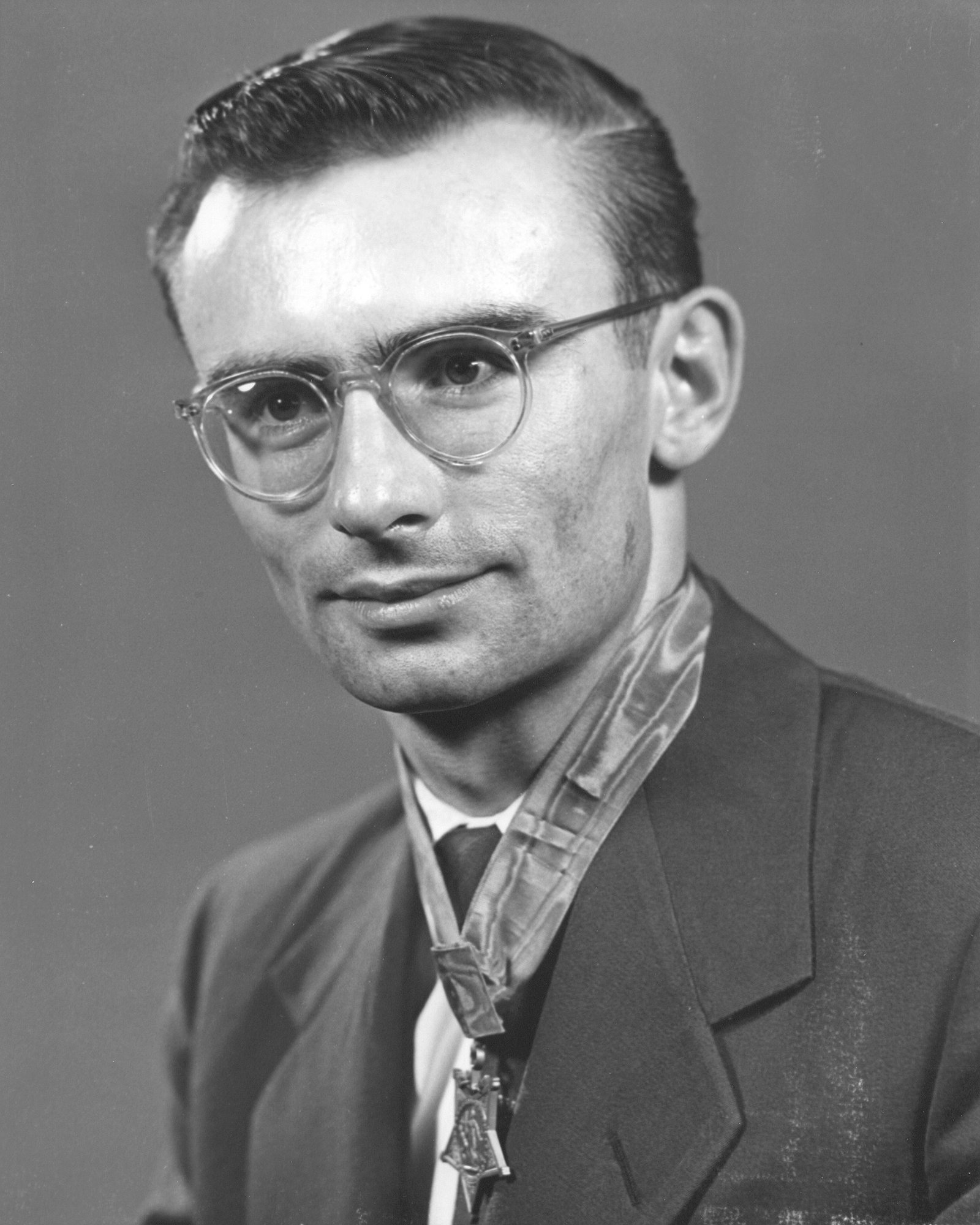
- Born: Robert Ernest Simanek; 26 April 1930; Detroit, Michigan, U.S.
- Died: 1 August 2022 (aged 92); Novi, Michigan, U.S.
- Military career
- Allegiance: United States
- Branch: United States Marine Corps
- Service years: 1951–1953
- Rank: Private first class
- Unit: 2nd Battalion 5th Marines
- Conflicts: Korean War; Battle of Bunker Hill
- Awards: Medal of Honor; Purple Heart

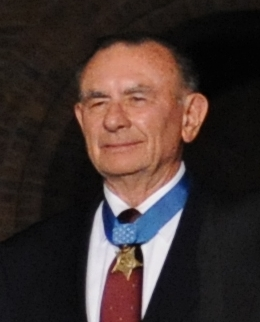
Simanek in 2010

Robert Ernest Simanek (26 April 1930 – 1 August 2022) was a United States Marine and a recipient of the United States military's highest decoration, the Medal of Honor, for his actions during the Korean War.

== Early life ==
Simanek was born in Detroit, Michigan, on 26 April 1930. He graduated from high school there in 1948 and worked for the Ford Motor Company and General Motors, before joining the United States Marine Corps on 13 August 1951.

== Marine Corps ==
Completing recruit training at Marine Corps Recruit Depot Parris Island, South Carolina, in October 1951, Simanek was ordered to Camp Pendleton, California, the following month. After further training at Camp Pendleton, he sailed for Korea in April 1952, joining Company F, 2nd Battalion, 5th Marines on 6 May. He had earned two battle stars by the time of his Medal of Honor action.

Simanek was serving with Company F, 2nd Battalion, 5th Marines, 1st Marine Division, when the action occurred on 18 August 1952, during the Battle of Bunker Hill. His patrol had gone well forward of friendly lines to occupy an outpost when the Marines ran into a trap. He threw himself on an enemy grenade to save his comrades, and was severely wounded in the legs.

Simanek received medical treatment aboard the hospital ship USS Haven and in Japan before being returned to the United States in September 1952. He then was hospitalized at Mare Island, California, and at Naval Station Great Lakes, Illinois, until he was placed on the temporary disability retired list, 1 March 1953.

The Medal of Honor was presented to him by President Dwight D. Eisenhower in a White House ceremony on 27 October 1953. He was the 36th Marine to receive the medal in the Korean War.

In addition to the Medal of Honor, Simanek was also awarded the Purple Heart, the Korean Service Medal with two bronze service stars, the United Nations Service Medal, and the National Defense Service Medal.

== Personal life ==
Simanek married Nancy Middleton in 1956. They remained married until her death in 2020. Together, they had one child, Ann.

After retiring from the military, Simanek obtained a degree in business management from Wayne State University. He was then employed in the auto industry and by the Small Business Administration. Simanek died on 1 August 2022, in Novi, Michigan. He was 92 years old.

== Awards and honors ==

Medal of Honor		Purple Heart
National Defense Service Medal	Korean Service Medal w/ 2 service stars	United Nations Korea Medal

=== Medal of Honor citation ===
Simanek's official Medal of Honor citation reads:

For conspicuous gallantry and intrepidity at the risk of his life above and beyond the call of duty while serving with Company F, Second Battalion, Fifth Marines, First Marine Division (reinforced), in action against enemy aggressor forces in Korea on 17 August 1952. While accompanying a patrol en route to occupy a combat outpost forward of friendly lines, Private First Class Simanek exhibited a high degree of courage and resolute spirit of self-sacrifice in protecting the lives of his fellow Marines. With his unit ambushed by an intense concentration of enemy mortar and small-arms fire, and suffering heavy casualties he was forced to seek cover with the remaining members of the patrol in the near-by trench line. Determined to save his comrades when a hostile grenade was hurled into their midst, he unhesitatingly threw himself on the deadly missile, absorbing the shattering violence of the exploding charge in his own body and shielding his fellow Marines from serious injury or death. Gravely wounded as a result of his heroic action Private First Class Simanek, by his daring initiative and great personal valor in the face of almost certain death, served to inspire all who observed him and upheld the highest traditions of the United States Naval Service.

On 15 January 2021 the Secretary of the Navy announced that the Expeditionary Sea Base ESB-7 would be named USS Robert E. Simanek.

== See also ==
- List of Korean War Medal of Honor recipients
- USS Robert E. Simanek
