= Battle of Bunker Hill (1952) =

Battle of the Korean War

Coordinates: 37.965°N 126.721°E

- Part of the Korean War
Date	9 August – 30 September 1952
Location	Northeast of Panmunjom, Korea
Result	UN victory

Belligerents
United Nations: United States	China

Commanders and leaders
General John T. Selden	

Units involved
1st Marine Regiment	

Casualties and losses
~96 killed	~200 killed UN estimate 3,900 casualties

The Battle of Bunker Hill was fought between 9 August and 30 September 1952 during the Korean War between United Nations Command (UN) and Chinese forces over several frontline outposts.

== Background ==
In March 1952 the US 1st Marine Division was transferred to US I Corps and moved onto the Jamestown Line, the UN's Main line of resistance (MLR) across Korea. The segment of the Jamestown Line assigned to the 1st Marine Division extended southwest from the Samichon River and the left flank of the British 1st Commonwealth Division, crossed the 38th Parallel (the original demarcation between North and South Korea) shifted to the south bank of the Imjin River in the vicinity of Munsan-ni, continued to the conflux of the Imjin and Han River, and then followed the south bank of the Han past the Kimpo Peninsula.

Opposing the Marines on the Jamestown Line, the Chinese People's Volunteer Army (PVA) had the 65th and 63rd Armies, totaling 49,800 troops.

== Battle ==
=== Outpost Siberia (9–10 August) ===
Shortly after midnight on 9 August, the PVA seized Outpost Siberia (Hill 58A), the site of a squad-size outpost, and also probed the positions of the 1st Marine Regiment. Siberia lay midway between the MLR and the line of PVA outposts. PVA possession of Siberia would provide observation posts to adjust artillery and mortar fire against the nearest segment of the Jamestown Line. As a result, Colonel Walter F. Layer's 1st Marines, on the right of the division's line, counterattacked at once, using the same unit, Company E, 2nd Battalion, 1st Marines that had dispatched the squad driven from Siberia. PVA artillery and mortar fire, directed from Hills 110 and 120, stopped the counterattack short of its objective. The Marines called for air strikes and additional artillery fire before renewing the counterattack on Siberia. At 06:50, four F9F jets from the 1st Marine Air Wing struck, dropping Napalm and 500-pound bombs. Shortly before 10:00, Air Force F-80 jets dropped 1,000-pound bombs, and a platoon from Company A, 1st Battalion, 1st Marines, the regimental reserve of the 1st Marines, stormed the hill, with the support of a platoon from the 2nd Battalion's Company E. The PVA again replied with mortars and artillery but could not stop the assault, which seized the crest. The supporting platoon from Company E joined in organizing the defense of the recaptured outpost, which came under a deadly torrent of accurate fire that forced the Marines to seek the protection of the reverse slope, nearer the MLR, where they held out until midafternoon before falling back. The PVA's artillery and mortars had fired an estimated 5,000 rounds, wounding or killing three quarters of the Marines who had attacked Siberia on the morning of 9 August. While Companies E and A reorganized the task of recapturing Siberia fell to Company C, which attacked with two platoons starting uphill at 01:16 on 10 August. A firefight erupted, lasting four hours, but the Marines gained the crest and held it until dawn, when driven from Siberia by a PVA counterattack. The losses suffered by the 1st Marines, 17 killed and 243 wounded within 30 hours, convinced Colonel Layer that his regiment could not hold Siberia if Hill 122, nicknamed Bunker Hill, remained in PVA hands. He and his staff planned a sudden thrust at Bunker Hill, possession of which would enable his command to dominate Siberia and observe movement beyond the PVA outpost line.

=== Battle for Bunker Hill (11–15 August) ===
To disguise the true objective, Lieutenant Colonel Roy J. Batterton attacked Siberia at dusk on 11 August with one company from his 2nd Battalion. The 1st Tank Battalion supported the maneuver with four M46 Patton tanks each mounting a 90mm gun and an 18-inch searchlight fitted with shutter to highlight a target in a brief burst of illumination, and four M4A3E8 tanks, each carrying a flamethrower. While the M46s hammered Hill 110, the M4A3E8s climbed Siberia, using bursts of flame to light their way and gained the crest before doubling back toward Marine lines. As the flame-throwing M4A3E8 withdrew, the M46s opened fire on both Siberia and Hill 110, illuminating targets with five-second bursts of light from their shuttered searchlights and Company D overran Siberia, holding the crest until midnight when the diversionary attack ended.

The Bunker Hill assault force, Company B, 1st Battalion, 1st Marines under the operational control of Batterton's 2nd Battalion—reached the crest by 22:30 and began driving the PVA from the slope nearest the MLR. The PVA defenders recovered from their initial surprise, but the bypassed pockets of PVA soldiers, though they tried to resist, could not check the Marine advance. In the wake of the assault force, other Marines and members of the Korean Service Corps manhandled sandbags, wire, and shovels up the hill to help Company B organize the defenses of the objective against the counterattack that was certain to come. PVA mortars and artillery harassed the Marines on Bunker Hill until dawn on 12 August, but the counterattack did not come until mid-afternoon, after Company B passed under the operational control of 3rd Battalion, 1st Marines. The defense of Bunker Hill became the responsibility of the battalion commander, Lieutenant Colonel Gerard T. Armitage. The volume and accuracy of the shelling increased at about 15:00, a barrage that lasted an hour and forced the Marines to seek the protection from direct fire afforded by the reverse slope. Company I, 3/1 Marines, reinforced the embattled Company B in time to help break up an attack by some 350 PVA and hold the southern slope of Bunker Hill.

While the battle raged on Bunker Hill, 1st Marine Division commander General John T. Selden moved his reserves closer to the fighting. Company I, 3rd Battalion, 7th Marines, took the place of Company I 3/1 Marines on the MLR, and by the end of the day, all of the 3/7 Marines, had come under the operational control of the 3/1 Marines. Selden attached the 2nd Battalion, 7th Marines, to strengthen the reserve of the 1st Marines. Meanwhile, Col. Layer moved two provisional platoons from his reserve, the 1st Battalion, to reinforce the 3rd Battalion, and the 3rd Battalion's reconnaissance platoon established an outpost on Hill 124, linking Bunker Hill with the MLR. This shuffling of units proved necessary because the 1st Marine Division was so thinly spread over an extended front. During the realignment, supporting weapons, ranging from machine guns through mortars and artillery to rocket batteries, prepared to box in the Marines holding the near slope of Bunker Hill, hammer the PVA at the crest and beyond, protect the flanks, and harass movement on the routes PVA reinforcements would have to use. As daylight faded into dusk on 12 August, the Marines defending the reverse slope of Bunker Hill struggled to improve their hurriedly prepared fortifications, for the anticipated PVA night counterattack. The comparatively gentle incline of the reverse slope of the ridge that culminated in Bunker Hill reduced the amount of dead space that could not be covered by grazing fire from the Marine position. Moreover, weapons on the Jamestown Line could fire directly onto the crest, when the expected attack began. By 20:00, all the supporting weapons had registered to help the two companies hold the position.

Just as the Marines had attacked Siberia on the evening of 11 August to divert attention from Bunker Hill, the PVA sought to conceal the timing of their inevitable counterthrust. Shortly before midnight on the night of 12 August, the PVA probed the division's sector at three points. While one PVA patrol was stumbling into an ambush set by Korean Marines, another harried a Marine outpost east of Bunker Hill. The third and strongest blow, however, landed after midnight at Stromboli, a Marine outpost on Hill 48A 4,500 yards (4,100 m) northeast of Bunker Hill at the far right of the sector held by the 1st Marine Regiment, near the boundary with the 5th Marine Regiment. In conjunction with the attack on Stromboli, launched in the early hours of August 13, the PVA hit Company F on the right of the line held by the 1st Marines. The PVA failed to crack the Jamestown defenses, but they inflicted so many casualties at Stromboli that reinforcements had to be sent. The reinforcing unit, a squad from Company F, came under mortar and machine gun fire from the PVA probing Company F's defenses and had to return to the MLR. Pressure against Stromboli and its defenders continued until the commander of Company F sent a stronger force that fought its way to the outpost, breaking the PVA encirclement. The 5th Marines moved one company into a blocking position behind the Jamestown Line near Stromboli in case the fighting again flared at that outpost.

Meanwhile, the PVA attempted to seize Bunker Hill. At about 01:00 on 13 August, intense PVA artillery and mortar fire persuaded Captain Connolly of Company I to request box-me-in fires, which the 11th Marine Regiment provided immediately. PVA infantry, supported by machine gun fire, advanced behind bursting shells, but the Marines fought back with every weapon they could bring to bear - artillery, mortars, tank guns, rockets, rifles, and automatic weapons. After almost four hours, the violence abated as the PVA relaxed his pressure on Bunker Hill. Company G, 3/7 Marines, joined 3/1 Marines before the PVA broke off the action and withdrew behind a screen of artillery and mortar fire. Except for a determined few, whom the Marines killed, the PVA abandoned Bunker Hill. Colonel Layer took advantage of the lull to send Company H, 3/7 Marines, to relieve the Marines holding the hill. He afterward withdrew all the other elements of the 7th Marines that had reinforced his regiment, but not until a patrol from Company I had reconnoitered the far slope of the hill.

In keeping with their usual tactics, the PVA tried to divert attention from Bunker Hill before attacking again. Mortars and artillery shelled Combat Outpost 2, overlooking the Panmunjom corridor on the left of the sector held by the 3/1 Marines, and also harassed the MLR nearby. The main PVA thrust, directed as expected against Bunker Hill, began at about 21:00 on the night of 13 August. While shells still exploded on Combat Outpost 2, the PVA intensified the bombardment of Bunker Hill, which had been under sporadic fire throughout the afternoon. PVA troops hit Company H, attacking simultaneously near the center of the position and on the right flank. High explosive shells boxed in the Marines, and illuminating rounds helped them isolate and kill the few PVA who had penetrated the position. The Chinese battalion that attacked Bunker Hill on the night of 13 August again tested the Marine defenses at 02:25 on 14 August. Before this unit's second attack, a PVA machine gun on Siberia began firing onto Bunker Hill. Marine M-46s illuminated Siberia with briefly with their searchlights and silenced the weapon with 90mm fire, revealing the position of the tanks and enabling PVA artillery fire to wound a crewman of one of them.

The 1st Marines responded to the fighting of 13 and 14 August by reinforcing both Bunker Hill and the nearest segment of the Jamestown Line, the so-called Siberia Sector, in anticipation of further PVA attacks. As part of the preparation, Company H, 7th Marines, which still held Bunker Hill, patrolled the slopes where the PVA had launched several attacks but found no Chinese, a situation that rapidly changed. At 01:18 on 15 August, a deluge of PVA artillery began pummeling the Marine position, while PVA infantry jabbed at the defenses. Once again, Marine supporting weapons laid down final protective fires that prevented this latest attack from gaining momentum. The crew of an M-46 tank triggered the shutter of its searchlight and illuminated a force of PVA massing in a draw. Before these soldiers could launch their assault, fire from tanks, artillery, and mortars tore into the group, killing or wounding many and scattering the survivors. Even though Marine-supporting weapons had deflected this planned thrust, the PVA regrouped, called in additional supporting fire and advanced. The bombardment by mortars and artillery attained a volume of 100 rounds per minute before ending at about 04:00, when the PVA apparently realized they could not overwhelm Bunker Hill and called off the attack. When the threat abated, Company H withdrew to the MLR, leaving the defense of Bunker Hill to Company B. The quiet lasted only until late afternoon. At 16:40, the PVA attacked during a thunderstorm, avoiding the use of mortars or artillery, presumably to achieve surprise, but once again the attack failed. The PVA refused, however, to abandon their attempts to seize Bunker Hill. At 00:40 on 16 August, a PVA battalion attacked behind mortar and artillery fire, penetrating to the crest of the hill. Company B which now held the hill, called for reinforcements, and a platoon from Company I, 3/7 Marines, arrived as this assault was ending. The PVA again probed the hill with fire but did not press the attack. Before Company C, 1/1 Marines, Company B, it came under artillery fire three more times.

The succession of Marine companies that took over Bunker Hill had to repel seven attacks before the end of August, but only one, on the night of 25–26 August, threatened to overrun the outpost. The struggle for Bunker Hill cost the Marines 48 killed, 313 seriously wounded, and hundreds of others who suffered minor wounds. The number of known PVA dead exceeded 200 and total casualties may have numbered 3,200. The month ended with Bunker Hill in Marine hands.

As the month of August wore on, any lull in the action around Bunker Hill usually coincided with a surge in the fighting elsewhere, usually on the right of the MLR, the segment held by the 5th Marines, commanded after 16 August by Colonel Eustace R. Smoak. On 6 August, while Colonel Culhane still commanded the regiment, the PVA began chipping away at the outpost line in front of the 2nd Battalion, 5th Marines, which consisted of Outposts Elmer, Hilda and Irene. Because the battalion manned the outposts only in daylight, the PVA simply occupied Elmer, farthest to the southwest, after dusk on 6 August and employed artillery fire to seal off the approaches and prevent the Marines from returning after daybreak. The PVA took over Outpost Hilda on the night of 11 August, driving back the Marines sent to reoccupy it the following morning. The same basic tactics enabled the PVA to take over Outpost Irene on the 17th. During an unsuccessful attempt to regain the third of the outposts, Private First Class Robert E. Simanek saved the lives of other Marines by diving onto a PVA hand grenade, absorbing the explosion with his body, suffering severe though not fatal wounds, and earning the Medal of Honor.

Heavy rains turned roads into swamps throughout the Marine sector, swept away a bridge over the Imjin River, and forced the closing of a ferry. Bunkers remained largely unaffected by flooding, but the deluge interfered with both air support and combat on the ground. Since the rain fell alike on the UN and PVA forces, activity halted temporarily when 9 inches (230 mm) fell between 23 and 25 August.

Major General Edwin A. Pollock assumed command of the 1st Marine Division on 29 August 1952 and he immediately had to deal with renewed PVA pressure against the Bunker Hill complex, now held by Company E, 2/1 Marines, attached temporarily to the regiment's 3d Battalion. On the night of 4 September, PVA gunners began shelling the outpost and probing its right flank, but small arms fire forced the enemy to pull back. The resulting lull lasted only until 01:00 on 5 September, when PVA mortars and artillery resumed firing, concentrating on Bunker Hill. Apparently confident that the barrage had neutralized the defenses, the attackers ignored cover and concealment and moved boldly into an unexpected hail of fire that drove them back. After regrouping, the PVA attacked once again, this time making use of every irregularity in the ground and employing the entire spectrum of weapons from hand grenades to artillery. This latest effort went badly awry when a force trying to outflank Bunker Hill lost its way and drew fire from Marines on the MLR. The attackers tried to correct their mistake only to come under fire from their fellow PVA who had penetrated the extreme right of Bunker Hill's defenses and may have mistaken their comrades for counterattacking Marines. Amid the confusion Company E surged forward and drove the PVA from the outpost. The Marines of Company E suffered 12 killed and 40 wounded in routing a PVA battalion while killing an estimated 335 PVA.

=== Outpost Bruce (5–6 September) ===
Yet another diversionary attack on Outpost Stromboli coincided with the thrust against Bunker Hill. The Marines defending Stromboli sustained no casualties in breaking up an attack by a PVA platoon supported by machine guns. The 2nd and 3rd Battalions, 5th Marines fought to defend their outpost line from Allen in the west, through Bruce, Clarence, Donald, Felix, and Gary, to Jill in the east against a succession of attacks that began in the early hours of 5 September. At Outpost Bruce, manned by Company I, 3/5 Marines, under Captain Edward Y. Holt, Jr., a company of attacking infantry followed up a savage barrage. Private First Class Alford L. McLaughlin killed or wounded an estimated 200 PVA, victims of the machine guns, carbines and grenades that he used at various times during the fight, and survived to receive the Medal of Honor. Private First Class Fernando L. Garcia, also earned the award, although already wounded, he threw himself on a PVA grenade, sacrificing his life to save his platoon sergeant. Hospitalman Third Class Edward C. Benfold saw two wounded Marines in a shell hole on Outpost Bruce; as he prepared to attend to them, a pair of grenades thrown by two onrushing PVA soldiers fell inside the crater. Benfold picked up one grenade in each hand, scrambled from the hole, and pressed a grenade against each of the two soldiers. The explosions killed both the Chinese, as Benfold sacrificed himself to save the two wounded Marines, earning a posthumous Medal of Honor. When dawn broke on 5 September, Company I still clung to Outpost Bruce, even though only two bunkers, both on the slope nearest the Jamestown Line, survived destruction by mortar and artillery shells. Reinforcements, construction and other supplies, and ammunition were rushed to the battered outpost despite harassing fire directed at the trails leading there. Marine and Air Force pilots tried to suppress the PVA gunners with 10 air strikes that dropped napalm as well as high explosive. On the morning of 6 September, the defenders of Outpost Bruce beat off another attack, finally calling for box-me-in fires that temporarily put an end to infantry assaults. At dusk, however, the PVA again bombarded the outpost, this time for an hour, before attacking with infantry while directing long-range fire at neighboring Outpost Allen to the southwest. The Marines defending Outpost Bruce survived to undergo further attack on the early morning of 7 September. Two PVA companies tried to envelop the hilltop, using demolitions in an attempt to destroy any bunkers not yet shattered by the latest shelling. For a total of 51 hours, the PVA besieged Outpost Bruce before breaking off the action by sunrise on the 7th. At Bruce, the site of the deadliest fighting in this sector, the Marines suffered 19 killed and 38 wounded PVA killed and wounded at Outpost Bruce may have totalled 200.

In late September, the PVA again attacked the combat outposts manned by Colonel Layer's 1st Marines, especially Hill 122 (Bunker Hill) and Hill 124 at the southwestern tip of the same ridge line. The PVA struck first at Hill 124, attacking by flare-light from four directions but failing to dislodge the squad dug in there, even though most of the Marines suffered at least minor wounds. The entire ridge from Hill 124 to Hill 122 remained under recurring attack for the remainder of September, especially Bunker Hill itself, where the PVA clung to advance positions as close as 30 yards (27 m) to Marine trenches. The PVA frequently probed Bunker Hill's defenses by night, and the Marines took advantage of darkness to raid PVA positions, using portable flamethrowers and demolitions to destroy bunkers while fire from tanks and artillery discouraged counterattacks.

== Aftermath ==
As October began, heavier PVA shelling, the prelude to a series of attacks on outposts all across the division front from the Korean Marine Corps on the left, past the 1st Marines and Bunker Hill, to the far right, where the 7th Marine Regiment, had taken over from the 5th Marines, now in reserve. To make communications more secure, The 7th Marines redesignated Outposts Allen, Bruce, Clarence, Donald, Gary and Jill, replacing proper names, in alphabetical order, with the randomly arranged names of cities: Carson, Reno, Vegas, Berlin, Detroit, Frisco, and Seattle. The first three outposts would becomes known as the Nevada Complex and would be the scene of further intensive fighting in the coming months.

Despite regular small ambushes and artillery attacks UN forces would hold Bunker Hill until the end of the war. As Bunker Hill lay within the Korean Demilitarized Zone set out in the Korean Armistice Agreement the Marines had only 72 hours after the ceasefire began to evacuate the position. Moreover, anything salvaged from Bunker Hill had to travel over a primitive road described as "particularly tortuous", which made the transfer "of first the ammunition and then the fortification materials a physical ordeal."
