= Moody, Alabama =

City in Alabama

- City
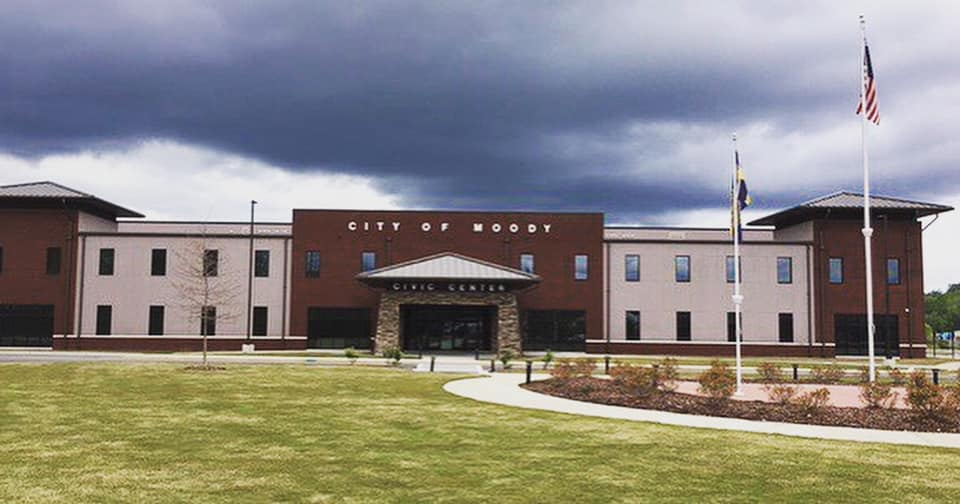
- Moody Civic Center

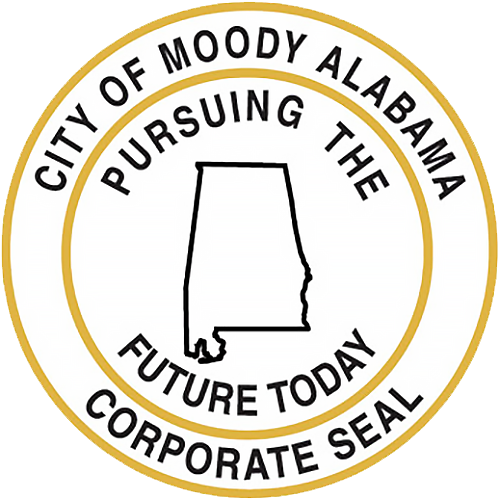
- Flag Seal
- Motto: Pursuing the Future Today
- Location of Moody in St. Clair County
- Coordinates: 33°35′33″N 86°29′47″W
- Country: United States
- State: Alabama
- County: St. Clair
- Incorporated: 1962
- Founder: Epps Moody

Government
  - Type: Mayor-Council
  - Mayor: Nick Rutledge

Area
  - Total: 24.85 sq mi (64.35 km^{2})
  - Land: 24.53 sq mi (63.54 km^{2})
  - Water: 0.31 sq mi (0.81 km^{2})
- Elevation: 699 ft (213 m)

Population (2020)
  - Total: 13,170
  - Density: 536.9/sq mi (207.28/km^{2})
- Time zone: UTC-6 (Central (CST))
  - Summer (DST): UTC-5 (CDT)
- ZIP code: 35004
- Area codes: 205, 659
- FIPS code: 01-51096
- GNIS feature ID: 2404295
- Website: www.moodyalabama.gov

Moody is a city located in St. Clair County, Alabama. The city was founded in 1907, and it was named after a local businessman named Epps Moody. The population was 13,170 at the 2020 census. The city is located approximately 22 miles (35 km) east of Birmingham.

== History ==
Moody was founded in 1907, named after a local businessman named Epps Moody.

In the early days, the city was primarily an agricultural community, with cotton and timber being the main crops. However, with the arrival of the railroad in the early 20th century, Moody began to grow and develop into a more industrialized city. Today, the city is home to a number of industries, including manufacturing, healthcare, and retail.

== Geography ==
According to the United States Census Bureau, the town has a total area of 24.0 square miles (62 km^{2}), of which 23.9 square miles (62 km^{2}) is land and 0.1 square miles (0.26 km^{2}) (0.58%) is water.

The city is located east of Birmingham along Interstate 20, which runs through the southern part of the city. Access can be found from exits 144 and 147. Via I-20, downtown Birmingham is 22 mi (35 km) west, and Atlanta is 127 mi (204 km) east. U.S. Route 411 also passes through the city, leading northeast 23 mi (37 km) to Ashville and southwest 5 mi (8 km) to Leeds.

== Demographics ==
Historical population
| Census | Pop. | Note | %± |
|---|---|---|---|
| 1970 | 504 | | — |
| 1980 | 1,840 | | 265.1% |
| 1990 | 4,921 | | 167.4% |
| 2000 | 8,053 | | 63.6% |
| 2010 | 11,726 | | 45.6% |
| 2020 | 13,170 | | 12.3% |
| 2025 (est.) | 13,559 | ▲ | 3.0% |
U.S. Decennial Census

=== 2020 census ===
As of the 2020 census, Moody had a population of 13,170. The median age was 38.7 years. 23.9% of residents were under the age of 18 and 16.0% of residents were 65 years of age or older. For every 100 females there were 92.7 males, and for every 100 females age 18 and over there were 87.5 males age 18 and over.

There were 5,239 households in Moody, including 3,516 families. 34.1% of households had children under the age of 18 living in them. Of all households, 52.1% were married-couple households, 15.2% were households with a male householder and no spouse or partner present, and 28.5% were households with a female householder and no spouse or partner present. About 26.7% of all households were made up of individuals and 11.5% had someone living alone who was 65 years of age or older.

There were 5,550 housing units, of which 5.6% were vacant. The homeowner vacancy rate was 1.5% and the rental vacancy rate was 7.0%. 65.8% of residents lived in urban areas, while 34.2% lived in rural areas.

Moody racial composition
| Race | Num. | Perc. |
|---|---|---|
| White (non-Hispanic) | 10,498 | 79.71% |
| Black or African American (non-Hispanic) | 1,342 | 10.19% |
| Native American | 33 | 0.25% |
| Asian | 228 | 1.73% |
| Pacific Islander | 3 | 0.02% |
| Other/Mixed | 625 | 4.75% |
| Hispanic or Latino | 441 | 3.35% |

=== 2010 census ===
As of the 2010 census, there were 20,017 people, 5,816 households, and 344 families residing in the city. The population density was 834.04 inhabitants per square mile (322.02/km^{2}). There were 3,317 housing units at an average density of 138.8 per square mile (53.6/km^{2}). The racial makeup of the town was 94.09% White, 3.81% African American, 0.42% Native American, 0.22% Asian, 0.37% from other races, and 1.08% from two or more races. 1.09% of the population were Hispanic or Latino of any race.

There were 3,126 households, out of which 34.6% had children under the age of 18 living with them, 60.8% were married couples living together, 10.6% had a female householder with no husband present, and 25.1% were non-families. 22.2% of all households were made up of individuals, and 8.1% had someone living alone who was 65 years of age or older. The average household size was 2.58 and the average family size was 3.02.

In the town, the population was spread out, with 26.2% under the age of 18, 7.8% from 18 to 24, 31.6% from 25 to 44, 23.6% from 45 to 64, and 10.7% who were 65 years of age or older. The median age was 36 years. For every 100 females, there were 95.6 males. For every 100 females age 18 and over, there were 90.8 males.

The median income for a household in the town was $39,500, and the median income for a family was $43,767. Males had a median income of $38,150 versus $26,089 for females. The per capita income for the town was $18,208. About 12.0% of families and 12.6% of the population were below the poverty line, including 13.9% of those under age 18 and 12.2% of those age 65 or over.

== Culture ==
The city hosts several events throughout the year, including the Moody Bluegrass Festival, which features live bluegrass music, arts and crafts, and food vendors. Other events include the Moody Miracle League Baseball Tournament, which raises money for the Miracle League of St. Clair County, and the Annual Christmas Parade.

== Education ==
=== Public schools ===
Administered by the St. Clair County School District:

- Moody Elementary School
- Moody Middle School
- Moody Jr. High School
- Moody High School

=== Private schools ===
- Gathering Place Christian Academy—Pre-K - 8th Grade
- Crossroads Christian School—Homeschooling Co-op; Pre-K - 12th Grade
