= Moody High School (Alabama) =

Location
- 714 High School Drive; Moody, Alabama 35004; United States
- 33°36′40″N 86°27′36″W

Information
- Type: Public
- Established: 1978 (48 years ago)
- School district: St. Clair County Schools
- CEEB code: 012112
- Principal: Christopher Walters
- Teaching staff: 34.32 (FTE)
- Grades: 9-12
- Enrollment: 677 (2023-2024)
- Student to teacher ratio: 19.73
- Campus type: Rural
- Colors: Navy Blue, Vegas Gold & White
- Athletics: AHSAA Class 5A
- Nickname: Blue Devils
- Feeder schools: Moody Junior High School
- Website: mhs.sccboe.org

Moody High School is a four-year public high school in the Birmingham, Alabama suburb of Moody. It is one of five high schools in the St. Clair County School System. School colors are Navy Blue, Vegas Gold & White and the athletic teams are called the Blue Devils. Moody competes in AHSAA Class 5A athletics.

The current Moody High School campus was constructed in 2002 at a cost of $8.2 million.

== Student profile ==
Enrollment in grades 9-12 for the 2013-14 school year is 667 students. Approximately 84% of students are white, 11% are African-American, 2% are Hispanic, 1% are Asian-American, and 2% are multiracial. Roughly 40% of students qualify for free or reduced price lunch.

Moody has a graduation rate of 77%. Approximately 87% of its students meet or exceed state proficiency standards in mathematics, and 82% meet or exceed standards in reading.

== Athletics ==
Moody competes in AHSAA Class 5A athletics and fields teams in the following sports:

- Baseball
- Basketball
- Cheerleading
- Cross Country
- Football
- Golf
- Indoor Track & Field
- Outdoor Track & Field
- Soccer
- Softball
- Tennis
- Volleyball
- Wrestling

Moody's football team won regional championships in 1987, 1994, and 2004. It has appeared in the state football playoffs 13 times.
