= Frederick W. Mausert III =

United States Marine Corps Medal of Honor recipient

Frederick William Mausert III
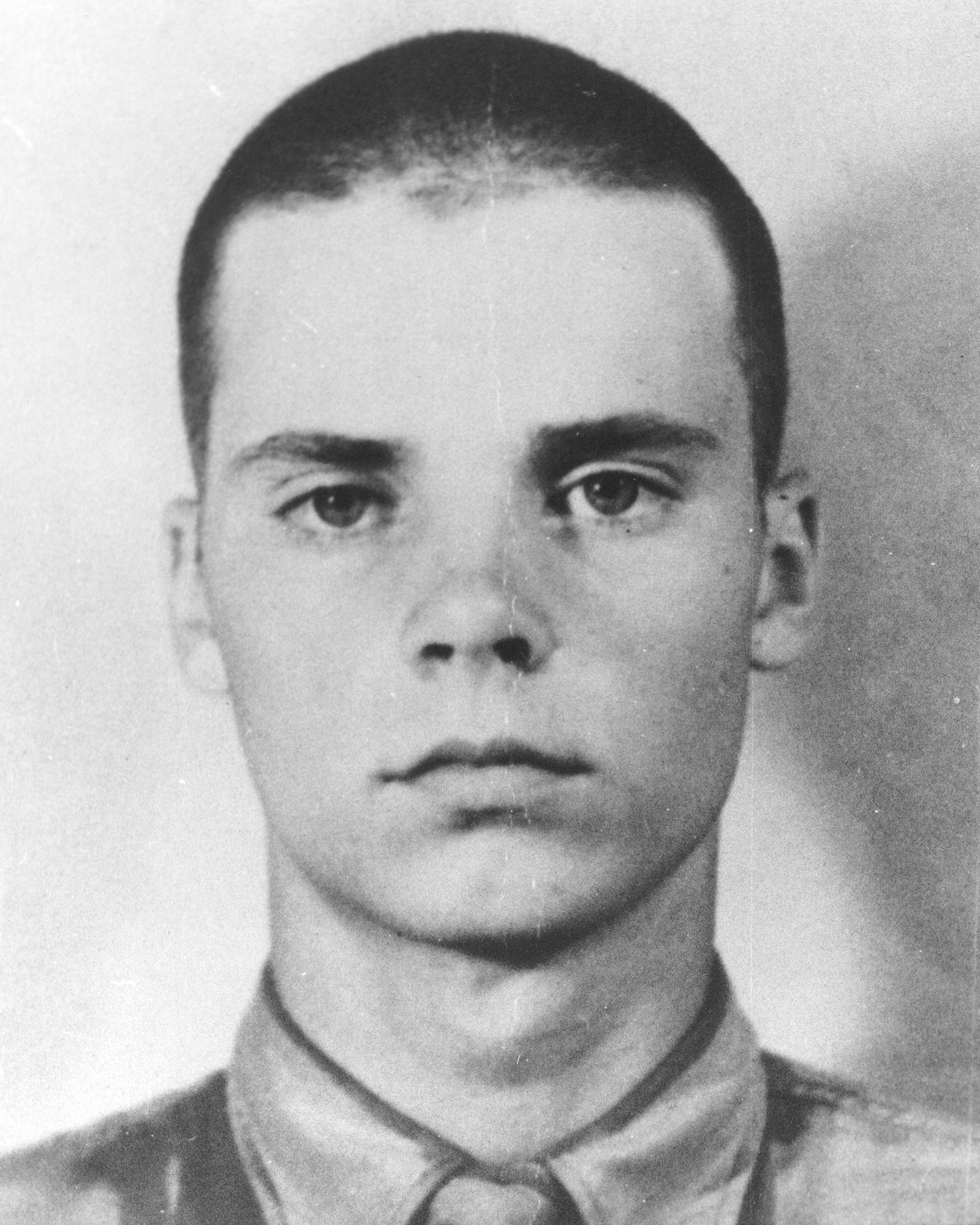
- Mausert in c. 1950
- Born: May 1, 1930; Cambridge, New York, United States
- Died: September 12, 1951 (aged 21); Punchbowl, South Korea
- Burial place: Arlington National Cemetery
- Military career
- Allegiance: United States
- Branch: United States Marine Corps
- Service years: 1948–1951
- Rank: Sergeant
- Nicknames: "Rick", "Rickie"
- Units: Company B, 1st Battalion, 7th Marines, 1st Marine Division
- Conflicts: Korean War: Battle of the Punchbowl
- Awards: Medal of Honor; Purple Heart (2)

Frederick William Mausert III (May 1, 1930 – September 12, 1951) was a United States Marine Corps sergeant who was posthumously awarded the Medal of Honor for his actions above and beyond the call of duty during the Battle of the Punchbowl in the Korean War.

Mausert and his rifle squad led the rifle platoon of his company in a bayonet attack on a hill heavily fortified by bunkers and defended by North Korean soldiers and machine guns. Although wounded twice in the attack for the hill, he refused to be evacuated twice, and continued to lead his squad and platoon under fire in destroying enemy emplacements until he himself was killed as he personally destroyed his second enemy machine gun position. He was the 20th Marine to receive the Medal of Honor for heroism during the Korean War.

== Early life ==
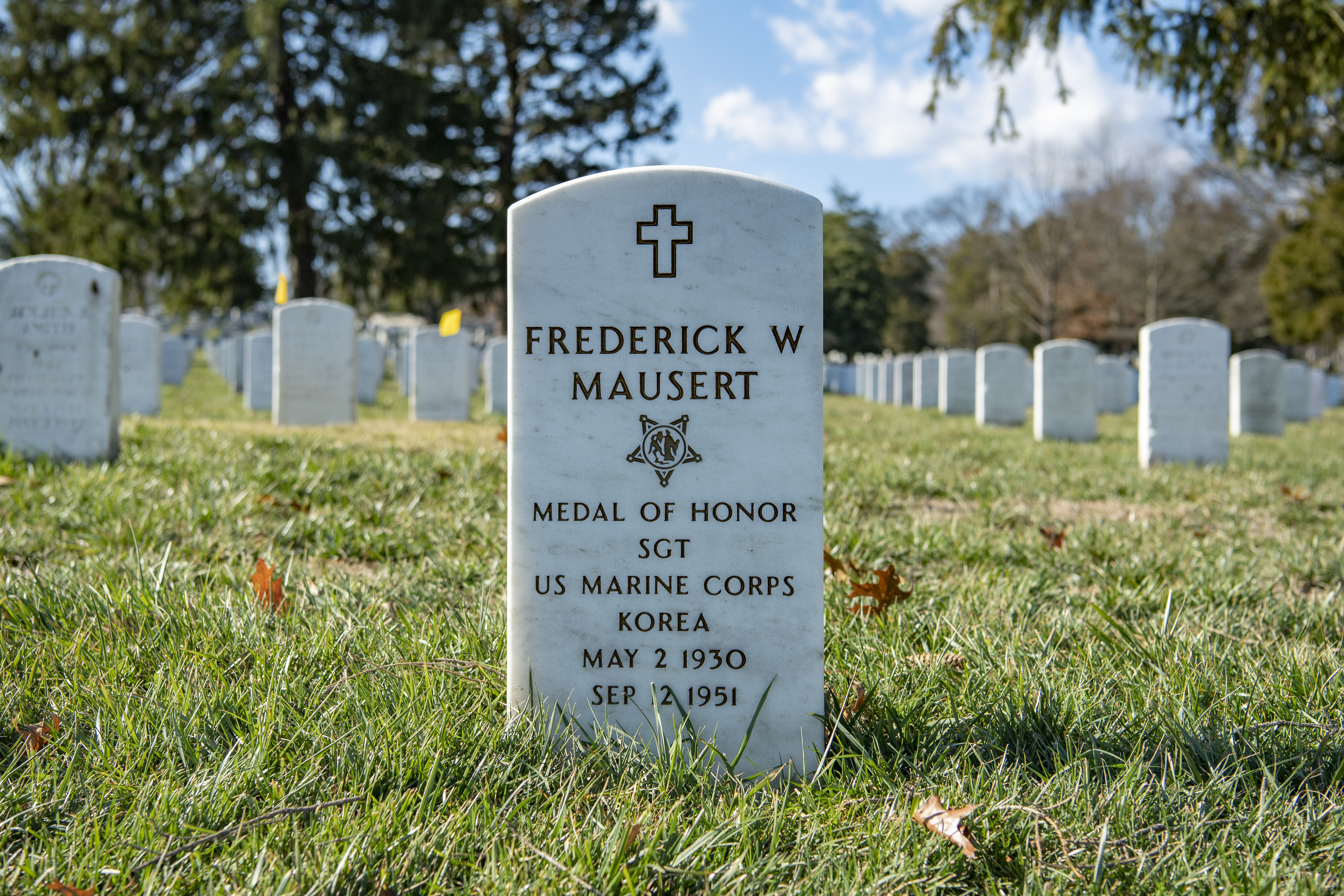
Grave at Arlington National Cemetery

Frederick William Mausert, III was born to Frederick and Gwen Mausert on May 2, 1930, in Cambridge, New York. Nicknamed "Rick" by his family, friends, and acquaintances, he went to elementary school at Union School in Cambridge, and Brooklyn, New York. After his parents divorced, he attended high school in Monson, Massachusetts, where he played baseball, track, and basketball. He lived in Dresher, Pennsylvania, and was employed by Glenside Hardware, Glenside, Pennsylvania.

== Military career ==
Mausert enlisted in the United States Marine Corps on June 21, 1948. Following recruit training at Marine Corps Recruit Depot Parris Island, South Carolina, he was stationed at Cherry Point and Camp Lejeune, North Carolina, before being sent to Korea in 1951. In Korea, he was assigned as a squad leader with B Company, 2nd Platoon, 1st Battalion, 7th Marine Regiment, 1st Marine Division.

On September 10, 1951, Mausert was wounded in action. On September 12, he was killed in action near Songnap-yong, South Korea, on Hill 673. Mausert had run through an enemy mined area under fire to bring to safety two seriously wounded Marines and suffered a head wound. Refusing evacuation, he led his squad and platoon in a bayonet charge up the hill by his rifle company against enemy bunkers and emplacements and was wounded again. He destroyed two machinegun positions with hand grenades. He was killed spearheading his platoon's attack on the remaining North Korean bunkers on the hill which they then overran.

On January 3, 1952, Mausert was buried in Arlington National Cemetery. Later that year, Mausert's mother, Gwen Mausert Barnes, was presented her son's posthumous Medal of Honor during a ceremony at the Pentagon.

A memorial was dedicated to Mausert in Cambridge, New York, in 1991.

== Medal of Honor citation ==
The President of the United States in the name of The Congress takes pride in presenting the MEDAL OF HONOR posthumously to

SERGEANT FREDERICK W. MAUSERT, III
UNITED STATES MARINE CORPS

for service as set forth in the following CITATION:

For conspicuous gallantry and intrepidity at the risk of his life above and beyond the call of duty while serving as a Squad Leader in Company B, First Battalion, Seventh Marines, First Marine Division (Reinforced), in action against enemy aggressor forces in Korea on 12 September 1951. With his company pinned down and suffering heavy casualties under murderous machine-gun, rifle, artillery and mortar fire laid down from heavily fortified, deeply entrenched hostile strongholds on Hill 673, Sergeant Mausert unhesitatingly left his covered position and ran through a heavily mined and fire-swept area to bring back two critically wounded men to the comparative safety of the lines. Staunchly refusing evacuation despite a painful head wound sustained during his voluntary act, he insisted on remaining with his squad and, with his platoon ordered into the assault moments later, took the point position and led his men in a furious bayonet charge against the first of a literally impregnable series of bunkers. Stunned and knocked to the ground when another bullet struck his helmet, he regained his feet and resumed his drive, personally silencing the machine-gun and leading his men in eliminating several other emplacements in the area. Promptly reorganizing his unit for a renewed fight to the final objective on top of the ridge, Sergeant Mausert boldly left his position when the enemy's fire gained momentum and, making a target of himself, boldly advanced alone into the face of the machine gun, drawing the fire away from his men and enabling them to move into position to assault. Again severely wounded when the enemy's fire found its mark, he still refused aid and continued spearheading the assault to the topmost machine-gun nest and bunkers, the last bulwark of the fanatic aggressors. Leaping into the wall of fire, he destroyed another machine-gun with grenades before he was mortally wounded by bursting grenades and machine-gun fire. Stouthearted and indomitable, Sergeant Mausert, by his fortitude, great personal valor and extraordinary heroism in the face of almost certain death, had inspired his men to sweep on, overrun and finally secure the objective. His unyielding courage throughout reflects the highest credit upon himself and the United States Marine Corps. He gallantly gave his life for his country.

/S/ HARRY S. TRUMAN

== Awards and Decorations ==
Sergeant Mausert received the following awards for his service

1st row	Medal of Honor	Purple Heart with 5/16 inch star	Combat Action Ribbon Retroactively Awarded, 1999
2nd row	Marine Corps Good Conduct Medal	National Defense Service Medal	Korean Service Medal with 2 Campaign stars
3rd row	Korean Presidential Unit Citation	United Nations Service Medal Korea	Korean War Service Medal Retroactively Awarded, 2003

== See also ==
- List of Korean War Medal of Honor recipients
