= 1956 Punchbowl avalanche =

Avalanche in South Korea

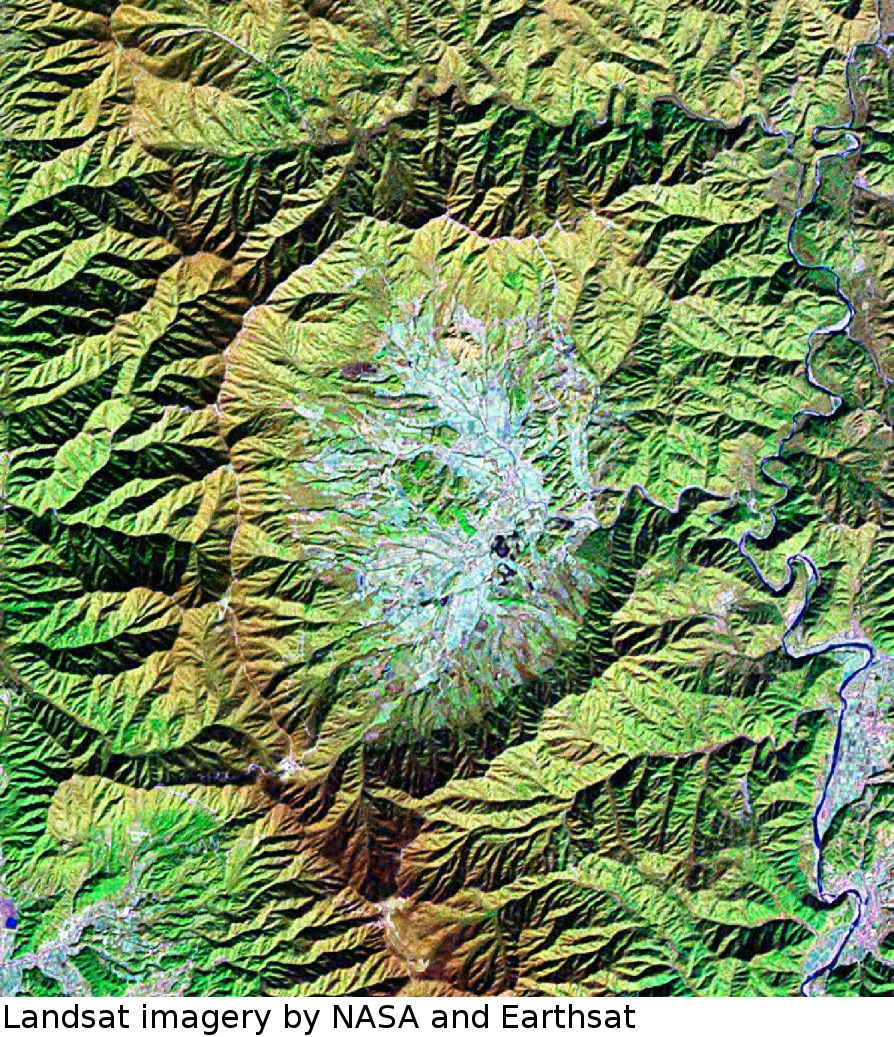
- Image of Punchbowl (2010)
- Date: March 2, 1956
- Location: Punchbowl (Haean Basin), South Korea
- Deaths: 79
- Injuries: 36—54
- Missing: 24
- Property damage: 83 army barracks infrastructure and vehicles
- Footage: British Pathé

The 1956 Punchbowl avalanche was a snow avalanche that occurred on 2 March 1956 on a mountain in Punchbowl, South Korea. The avalanche destroyed a base of the South Korean army. Over 100 soldiers were killed or missing.

The avalanche has been listed by Dutch newspaper Het Huisgezin as one of the main international disasters of 1956.

== Background ==
The Punchbowl, was the name given to the bowl-shaped Haean Basin in Yanggu County, Gangwon Province by UN Forces during the Korean War. The Punchbowl lies several kilometres south of the Korean Demilitarized Zone. The area saw heavy fighting during the Korean War and was located in the vicinity of the demilitarized zone between the communist and allied forces. Different sources reporting about the avalanche referred to the location as no man's land.

== Avalanche ==
Before 2 March 1956, after three days of blizzard there was a layer of 6 metres of snow in the Punchbowl area in South Korea. On 2 March 1956 an avalanche occurred on a mountain next to a base where the South Korean army lived. The avalanche destroyed the village and infrastructure, inclusive 83 South Korean army barracks.

As a results of the avalanche 79 soldiers died. 36 to 54 people were injured and 24 people were missing.

== Rescue operation ==
Rescue workers had great difficulty reaching the disaster area. This was partly due to the bad weather and the thick layer of snow of 6 metres.

On the same day, quickly after the avalanche, United States rescue helicopters flew to the disaster area. Due to the dangerous conditions, they were only able to transfer 17 injured people and four bodies. The next day the American helicopters continued with the rescue operation. Supplies were sent by American helicopters to the victims of the avalanche.
