= USS Sussex (AK-213) =

Cargo ship of the United States Navy

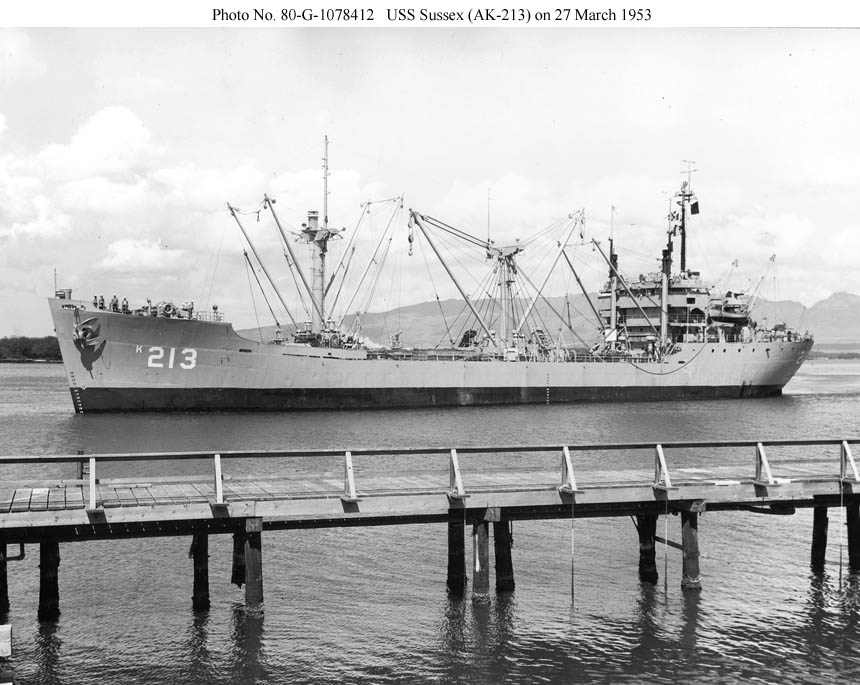
- USS Sussex (AK-213) underway, location unknown, 27 March 1953.

History

United States
- Name: Sussex
- Namesake: Sussex County, Delaware, Sussex County, New Jersey, and; Sussex County, Virginia
- Operator: USN: 1945, 1947–1960; USCG: July 1945–May 1946
- Ordered: as type (C1-M-AV1) hull, MC hull 2167
- Builder: Leathem D. Smith Shipbuilding Company, Sturgeon Bay, Wisconsin
- Yard number: 333
- Laid down: 3 October 1944
- Launched: 3 February 1945
- Sponsored by: Mrs. Carl O. Rydhelm
- Acquired: July 1945
- Commissioned: unknown
- Decommissioned: 23 May 1946
- Acquired: 27 February 1947
- Commissioned: 27 May 1947
- Decommissioned: 5 December 1959
- Stricken: 5 June 1946; 1 January 1960
- Identification: Hull symbol: AK-213; Code letters: NXPF
- Honors and awards: 3 × battle stars during the Korean War
- Fate: Sold for scrapping, 27 July 1960

General characteristics
- Class & type: Alamosa-class cargo ship
- Type: C1-M-AV1
- Tonnage: 5,032 long tons deadweight (DWT)
- Displacement: 2,382 long tons (2,420 t) (standard); 7,450 long tons (7,570 t) (full load)
- Length: 388 ft 8 in (118.47 m)
- Beam: 50 ft (15 m)
- Draft: 21 ft 1 in (6.43 m)
- Installed power: 1 × Nordberg, TSM 6 diesel engine; 1,750 shp (1,300 kW)
- Propulsion: 1 × propeller
- Speed: 11.5 kn (21.3 km/h; 13.2 mph)
- Capacity: 3,945 t (3,883 long tons) DWT; 9,830 cu ft (278 m^{3}) (refrigerated); 227,730 cu ft (6,449 m^{3}) (non-refrigerated)
- Complement: 15 Officers; 70 Enlisted
- Armament: 1 × 3 in (76 mm)/50 caliber dual purpose gun (DP); 6 × 20 mm (0.8 in) Oerlikon anti-aircraft (AA) cannons

USS Sussex (AK-213) was an Alamosa-class cargo ship that was constructed for the US Navy during the closing period of World War II. She was retained by the Navy for post-war service, including that in the Korean War theatre where she earned three battle stars and then returned home for deactivation.

== Construction ==
The second ship to be so named by the Navy. Sussex was laid down under US Maritime Commission (MARCOM) contract, MC hull 2167, on 3 October 1944, by the Leathem D. Smith Shipbuilding Company, Sturgeon Bay, Wisconsin; launched on 3 February 1945; sponsored by Mrs. Carl O. Rydhelm; and acquired by the Navy in July 1945.

== Service history ==
=== Operation by the Coast Guard ===
She was operated by the United States Coast Guard until the spring 1946, and on 23 May 1946, was placed in the reserve fleet. She was reacquired by the Navy on 27 February 1947; and commissioned on 27 May 1947.

=== Post-World War II service ===
Assigned to the Alaskan Sea Frontier, Sussex sailed to Seattle, Washington, in late June, loaded cargo, and made her maiden voyage to Alaskan ports for the United States Navy. After making calls at Adak and Kodiak, she returned to Seattle on 25 August 1947. From that date until December 1950, the ship made 16 voyages from Seattle to various Alaskan ports carrying supplies to bases and installations there.

=== Korean War service ===
From January to July 1951, Sussex provided logistic support for the mid-Pacific Trust Territories. From August 1951 to January 1952, she operated in the Korean war zone, moving supplies and munitions to United Nations ships and bases. The ship was busy transporting cargo from Japanese ports to such places as Pusan, Suyong, and Inchon.

On 5 February 1952, Sussex stood out of Yokosuka en route to Bremerton, Washington, for a general overhaul. She departed Bremerton on 12 May 1952 and proceeded via Pearl Harbor and Midway Island to Japan. The cargo ship arrived at Sasebo, Japan, on 30 June and resumed her runs to Korea; but this time, she also included Okinawa, Taiwan, and the Pescadores Islands among her supply points.

Sussex returned to Pearl Harbor on 15 December 1952 and, until March 1954, supplied bases at Midway Island, Kwajalein, Saipan, and Guam. She arrived at Yokosuka on 14 March and operated from that port until 19 October 1954 when she returned to Pearl Harbor to resume supplying mid-Pacific Ocean bases. She continued this duty, operating from Pearl Harbor, until 7 May 1958 when she moved her base of operations to Iwakuni, Japan.

=== Decommissioning ===
Sussex steamed into Yokosuka on 21 November 1959 and was decommissioned on 5 December 1959. She was struck from the Navy List on 1 January 1960 and sold to the Hugo Neu Steel Products Corp., New York, on 27 July 1960 for scrap.

== Awards and honors ==
Sussex received three battle stars for service during the Korean War:

- UN Summer-Fall Offensive

- Battle of the Punchbowl

- Second Korean Winter
- Korean Defense Summer-Fall 1952

- Operation Showdown

Qualified Sussex personnel were eligible for the following:

- American Campaign Medal
- World War II Victory Medal
- National Defense Service Medal
- Korean Service Medal (3)
- United Nations Service Medal
- Republic of Korea War Service Medal

== Notes ==
Citations

== Bibliography ==
Online resources

- "Sussex II (AK-213)". Dictionary of American Naval Fighting Ships. Naval History and Heritage Command. 24 September 2015. This article incorporates text from this source, which is in the public domain.
- "C1 Cargo Ships". www.ShipbuildingHistory.com. 28 August 2009.
- "USS Sussex (AK-213)". NavSource. 18 April 2014.
