= Sidney Greenberg =

American rabbi and author (1917–2003)

Sidney Greenberg (September 27, 1917 – March 31, 2003) was an American rabbi and author.

== Biography ==
Greenberg was born on September 27, 1917, in Brooklyn, the son of Morris Greenberg and Sadie Armel Greenberg. He was educated at Hirsh Laib Berlin Yeshivah in New York, received a BA from Yeshiva University in 1938, ordained at the Jewish Theological Seminary in 1942 and received a Doctor of Hebrew Letters there in 1947. Greenberg served as an army chaplain during World War II.

In 1941, Greenberg became the rabbi of Temple Sinai in Philadelphia, then later in Dresher, Pennsylvania, at the temple's founding and served his entire career there. Under his leadership, Temple Sinai was a leading conservative synagogues in Philadelphia, and the temple received several Solomon Schechter awards. He was a leader in female equality. He was also a supporter of zionism and in 1968 inaugurated an annual pilgrimage to Israel for members of his congregation.

Greenberg wrote numerous books on Judaism, wrote several prayer books, and many newspaper columns. He wrote a weekly column for The Philadelphia Inquirer from 1978 to 1982 and for Philadelphia's Jewish Exponent from 1982 until late in his life. He also served on the editorial boards of The Jewish Digest and The Reconstructionist. He served on the executive boards of the United Synagogue of America, Technion, Bonds for Israel, and the Rabbinical Assembly and chaired the Committee of 1,000 for Soviet Jewry. He was also president of the Philadelphia Region of the Rabbinical Assembly from 1953 to 1955. He also taught homiletics at the Yeshiva University Seminary and at the Reconstructionist Rabbinical College.

An excerpt from the chapter on Passover, from his book Torah Guidelines For Living Like A Mensch (Growth Associates Publishers, 2002):

"Here is where the Divine playwright enters. God is the true Hero of the Exodus. For it is God who enables a stammering, tongue-tied Moses to be the vehicle for the greatest words ever uttered by a human being. It is God who takes an inflated tyrant and cuts him down to size. It is God who converts an oppressed, downtrodden horde of slaves into 'a kingdom of priests and a holy people.' Every year at Pesah time the descendants of those ex-slaves retell and reenact this ancient drama, making it the longest running play in history."

At his death, Greenberg was survived by his wife of 60 years, Hilda Weiss Greenberg; daughters Reena Keren and Adena Greenberg; nine grandchildren, and two great-grandchildren. His daughter, Shira Ruskay, predeceased him.

== Works ==
- Adding Life to Our Years. New York: Jonathan David. 1959.
- Finding Ourselves. New York: Jonathan David. 1964.
- Completing Life. 1st Book Publishing. 2004.
- A Treasury of Comfort. No. Hollywood CA: Wilson Book Co. 1954.
- A Treasury of the Art of Living. Hartford CT: Hartman House. 1963.
- Light from Jewish Lamps: A Modern Treasury of Jewish Thoughts. Northvale NJ & London: Jason Aronson. 1986.
- A treasury of favorite sermons by leading American rabbis. Northvale NJ & London: Jason Aronson. 1999.
