= Roslyn, Pennsylvania =

Unincorporated community in Pennsylvania, US

Roslyn
- Census-designated place
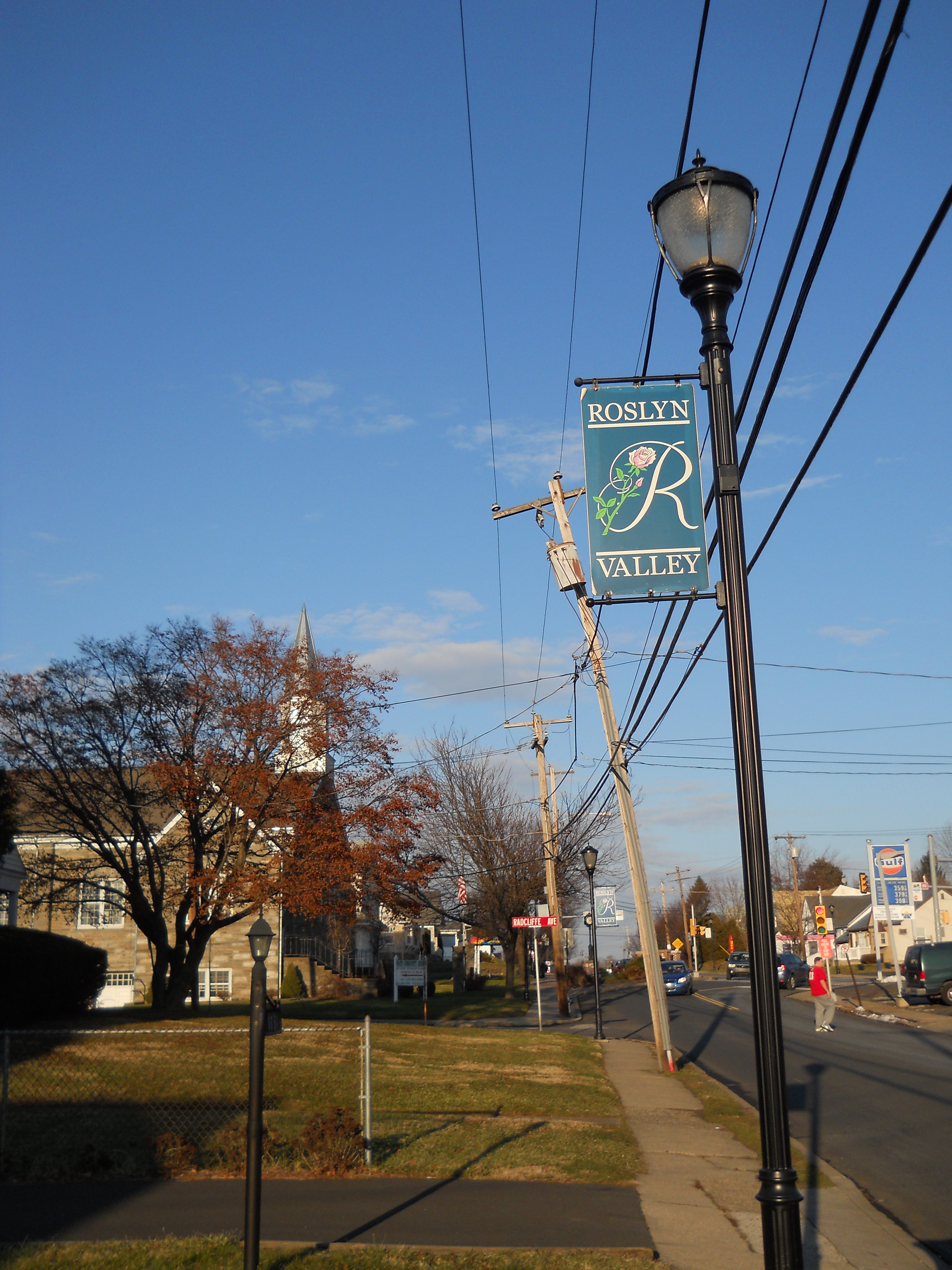
- Bradfield Road in Roslyn, January 2013

- Location of Roslyn in Pennsylvania
- Coordinates: 40°07′54″N 75°08′16″W
- Country: United States
- State: Pennsylvania
- County: Montgomery
- Township: Abington

Population (2020)
  - Total: 9,525
- Time zone: UTC-5 (EST)
  - Summer (DST): UTC-4 (EDT)
- ZIP Code: 19001
- Area codes: 215, 267 and 445
- FIPS code: 42-66256
- GNIS feature ID: 1193217
- Website: Official website

Roslyn is an unincorporated community and census-designated place in Montgomery County, Pennsylvania, United States. It is mostly in Abington Township, and extends into Upper Dublin Township as of 2020. Originally called Hillside, the name Roslyn came from rose gardens that once grew there.

The first known person of European descent to settle the area was John Tyson, who bought a tract of land here in 1717. He built lime kilns to turn the abundant local limestone into quicklime, starting an industry that operated into the late 20th century.

The first rail connection to Roslyn was built by the North East Pennsylvania Railroad in 1872. Today's railroad station, which replaced the original in the late 1970s, is on SEPTA's Warminster Line. The location of the train station in Roslyn is at the intersection of Susquehanna Road and Easton Road.

The CDP was first defined by the U.S. Census Bureau in the 2020 U.S. Census.

The headwaters for Sandy Run, a tributary of the Wissahickon Creek, are located in Roslyn. As of the 2020 United States census the population was 9,525.

== Education ==
The portion of the CDP in Abington Township is in the Abington School District, while the portion in Upper Dublin Township is in the Upper Dublin School District. The community is home to Roslyn Elementary School, one of the seven public elementary schools that make up Abington School District.

St. John of the Cross Elementary, a parochial school, closed in 2010, merging with Queen of Peace in neighboring Ardsley, PA forming Good Shepherd Catholic Regional Elementary School.

== Gallery ==
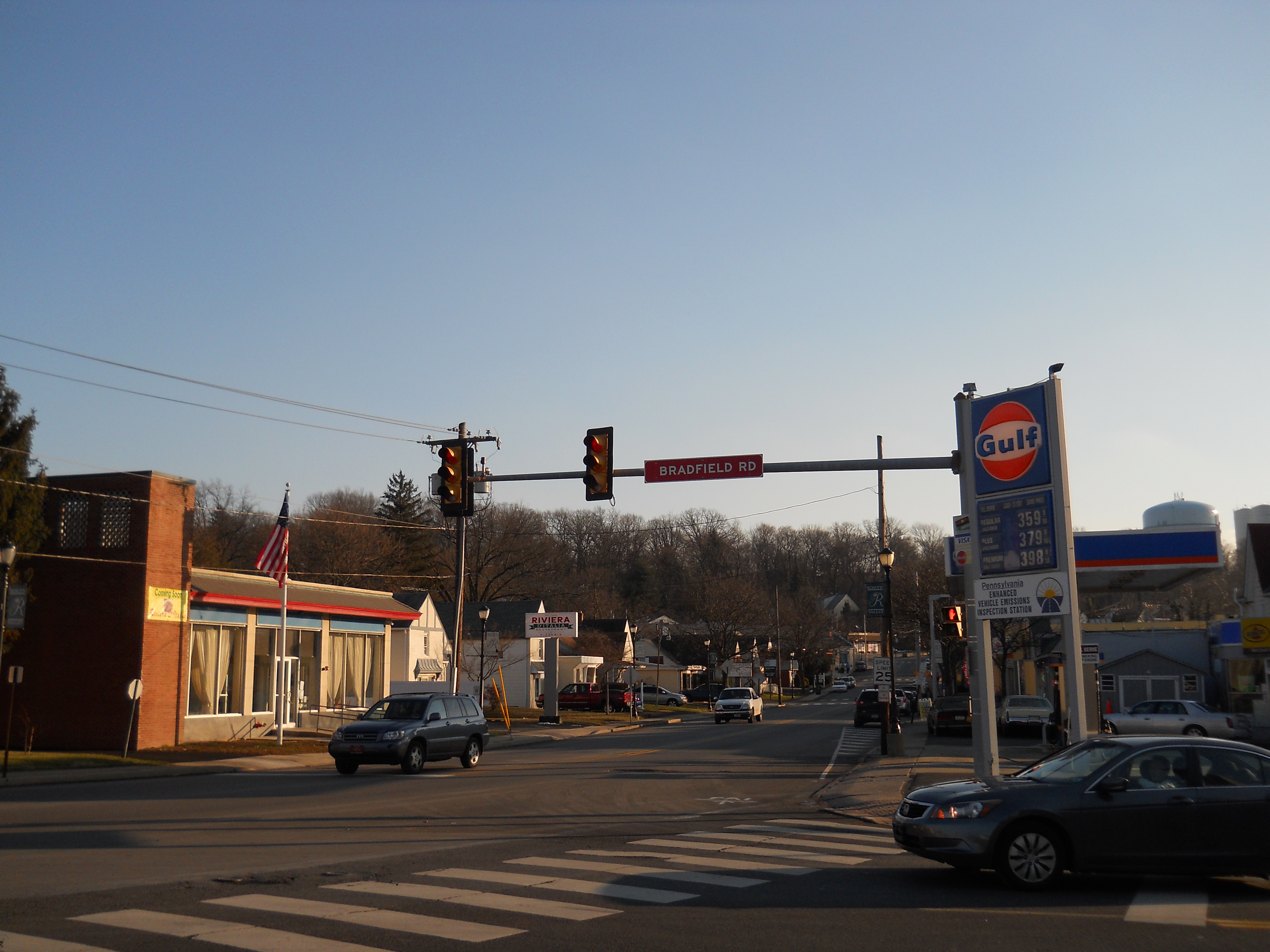
Roslyn. Corner of Easton (center-left side) and Bradfield (right side) Rds.

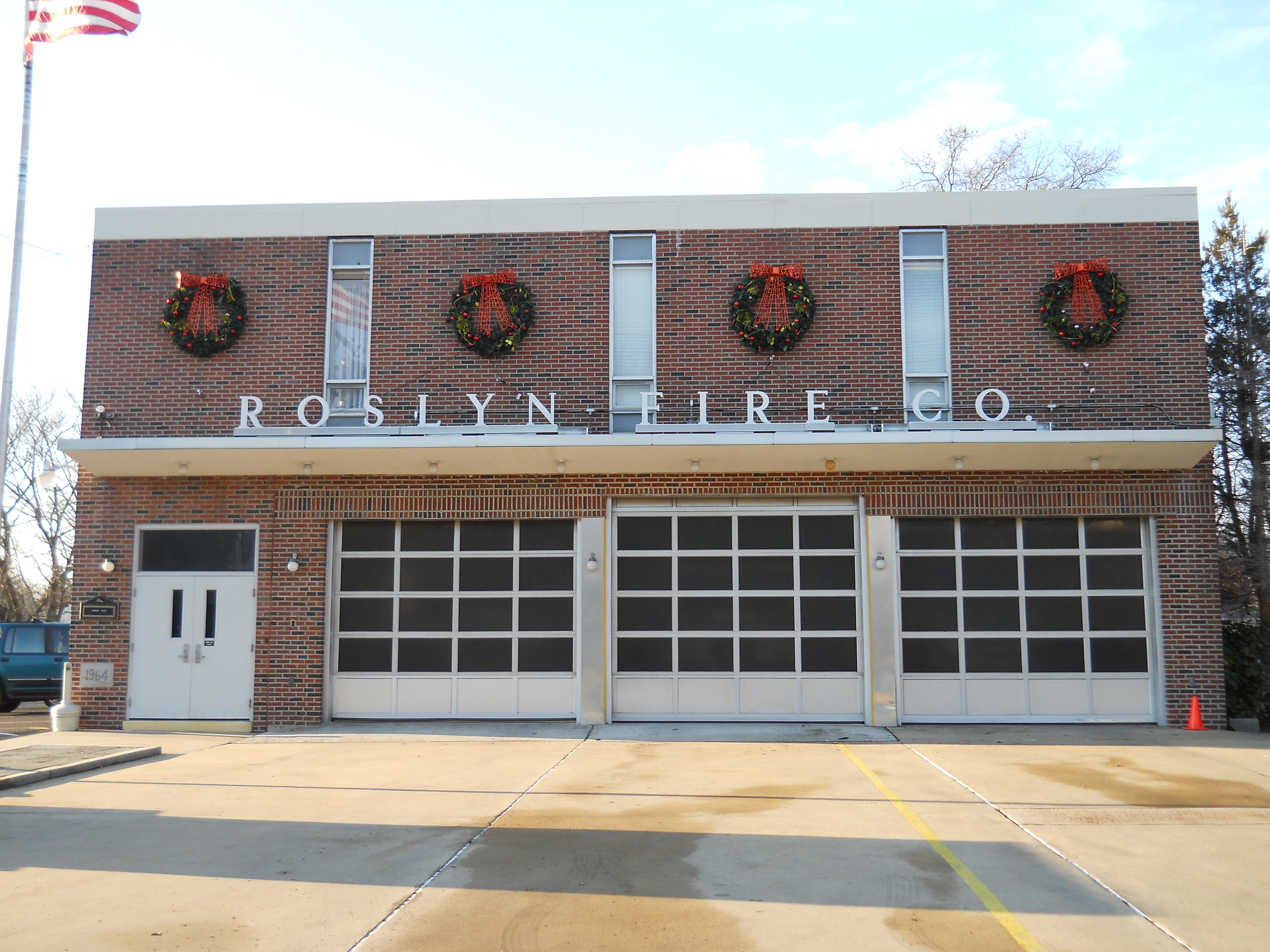
Roslyn Fire Company.

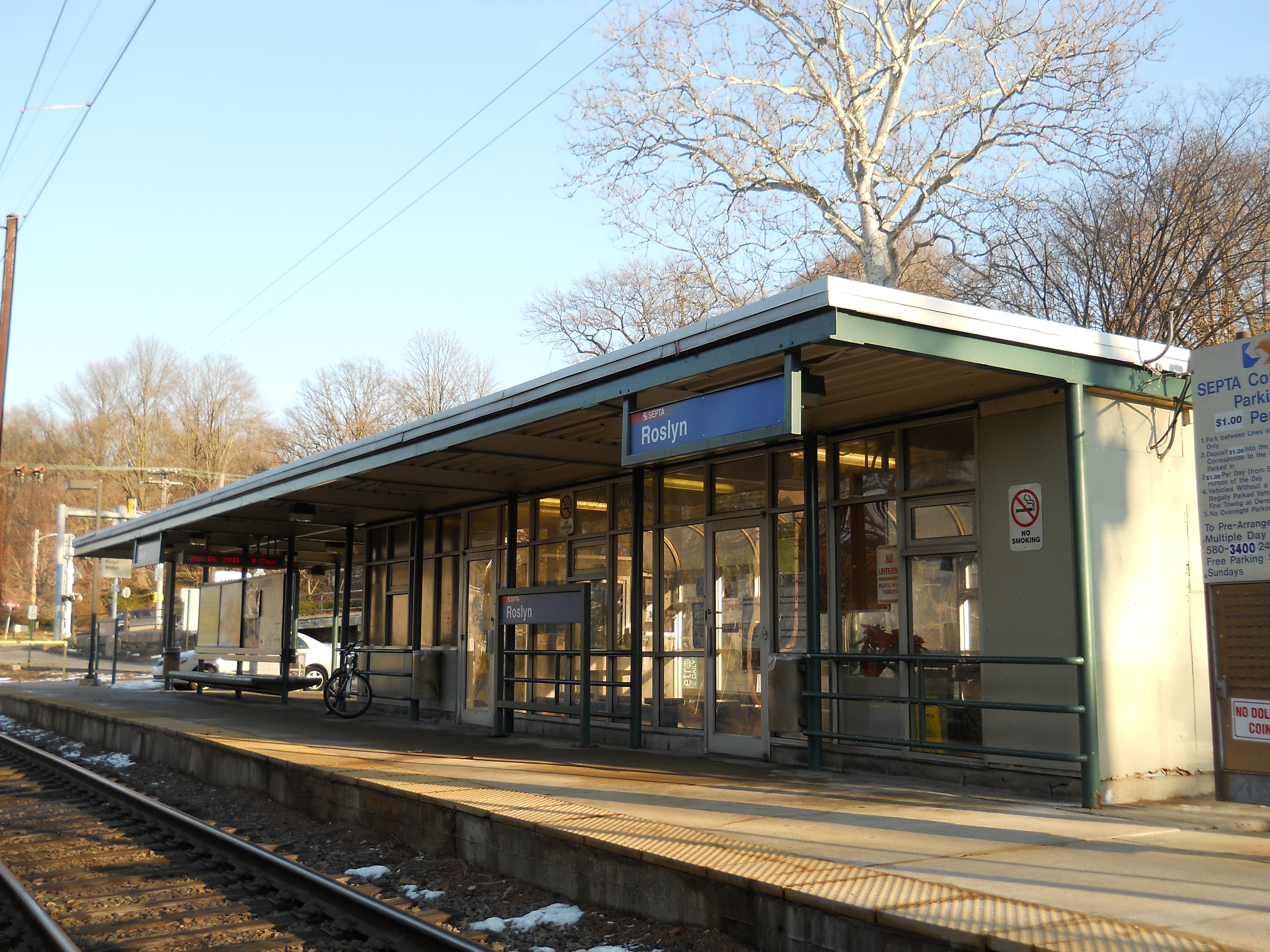
Roslyn Train Station.

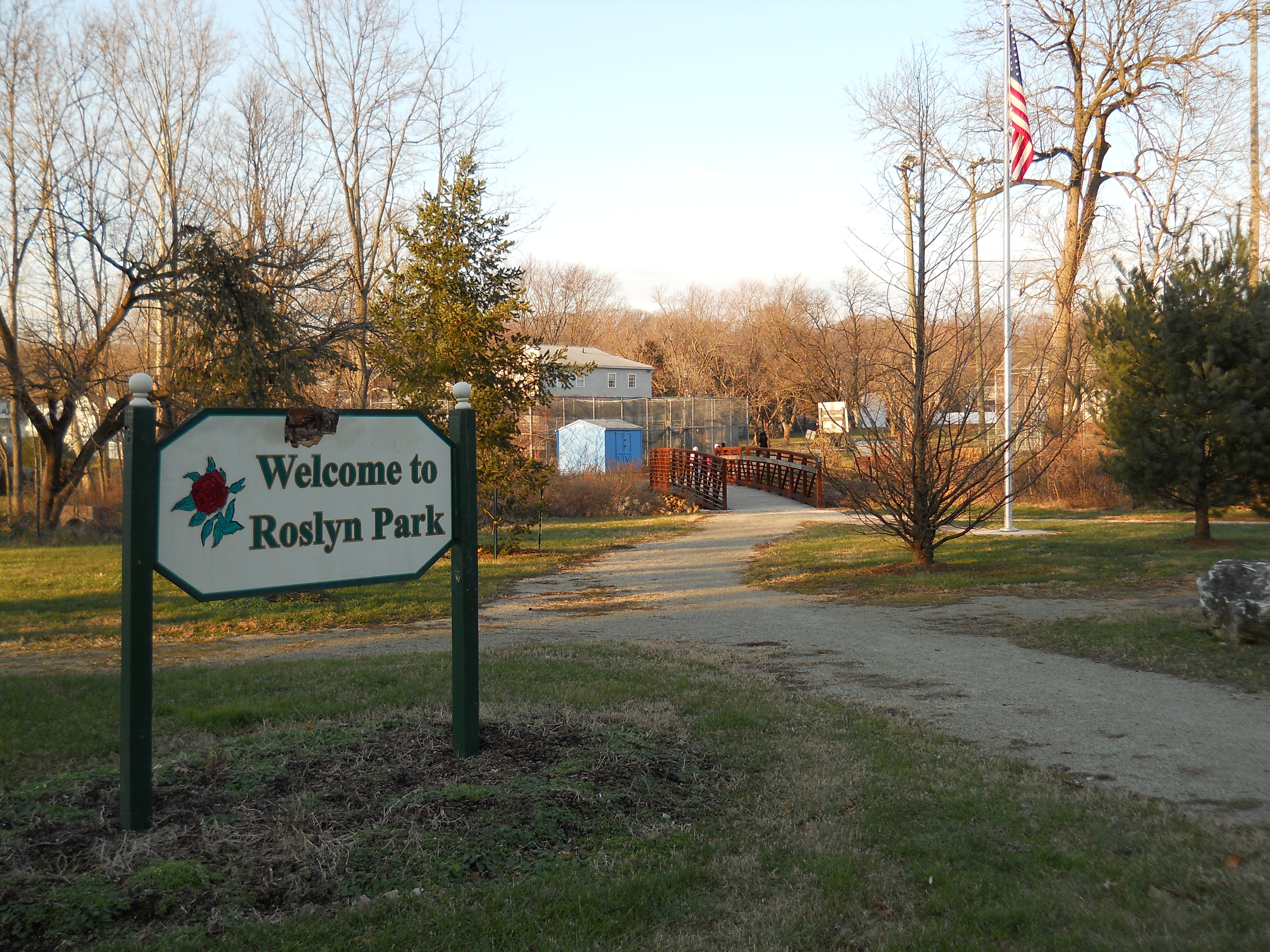
Roslyn Park.

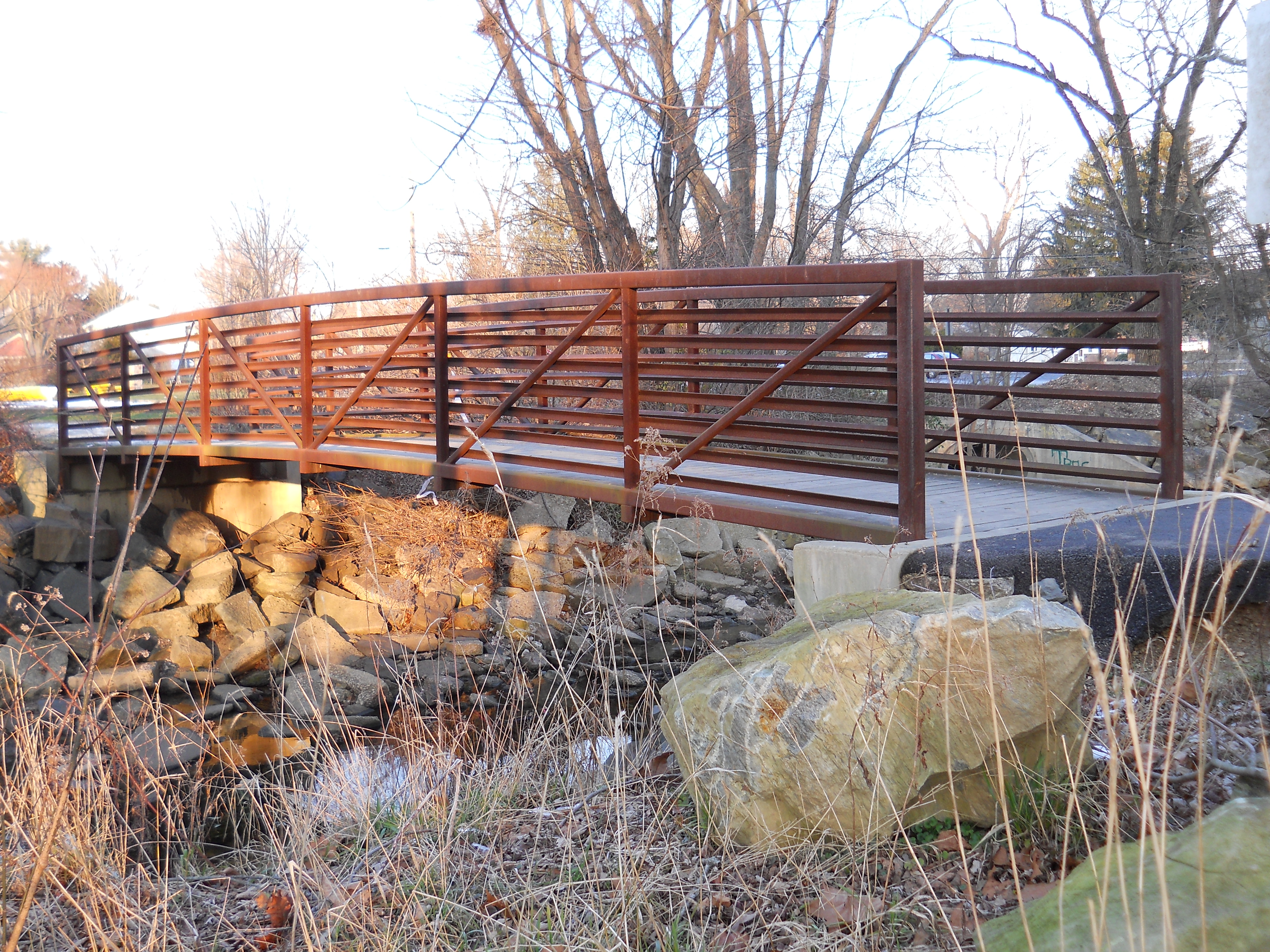
Bridge over Sandy Run in Roslyn Park.

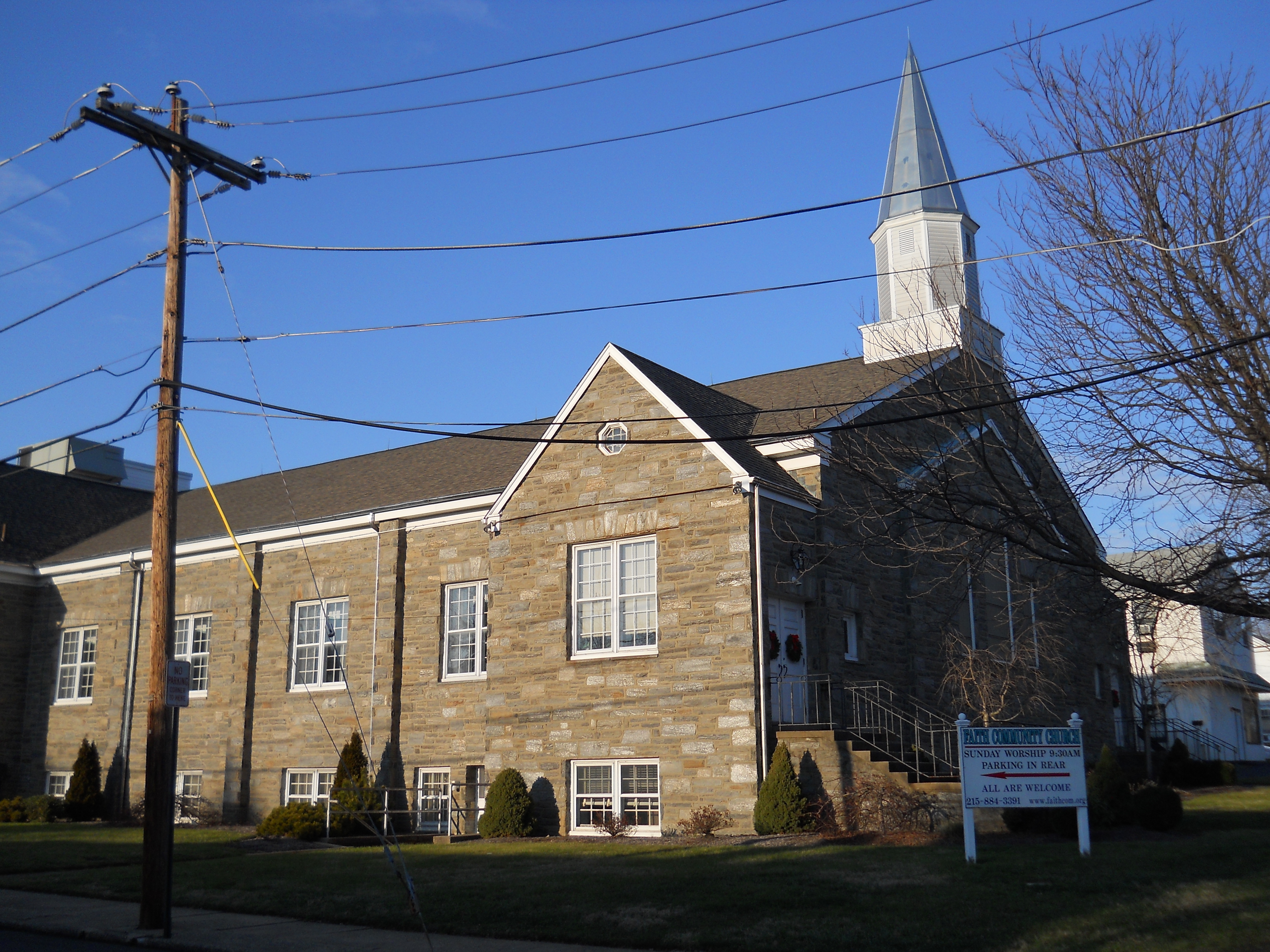
Faith Community Church.

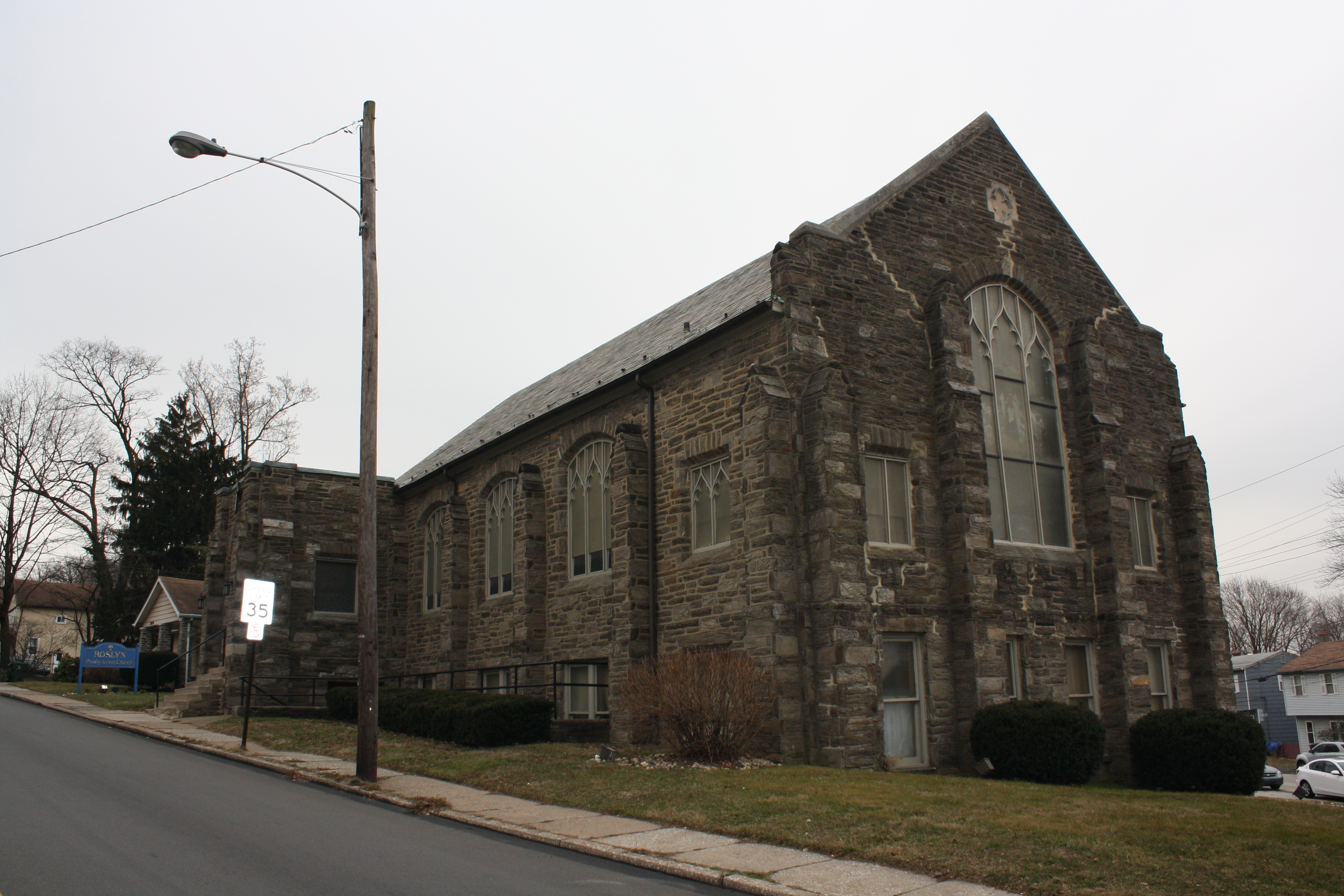
Roslyn Presbyterian Church.

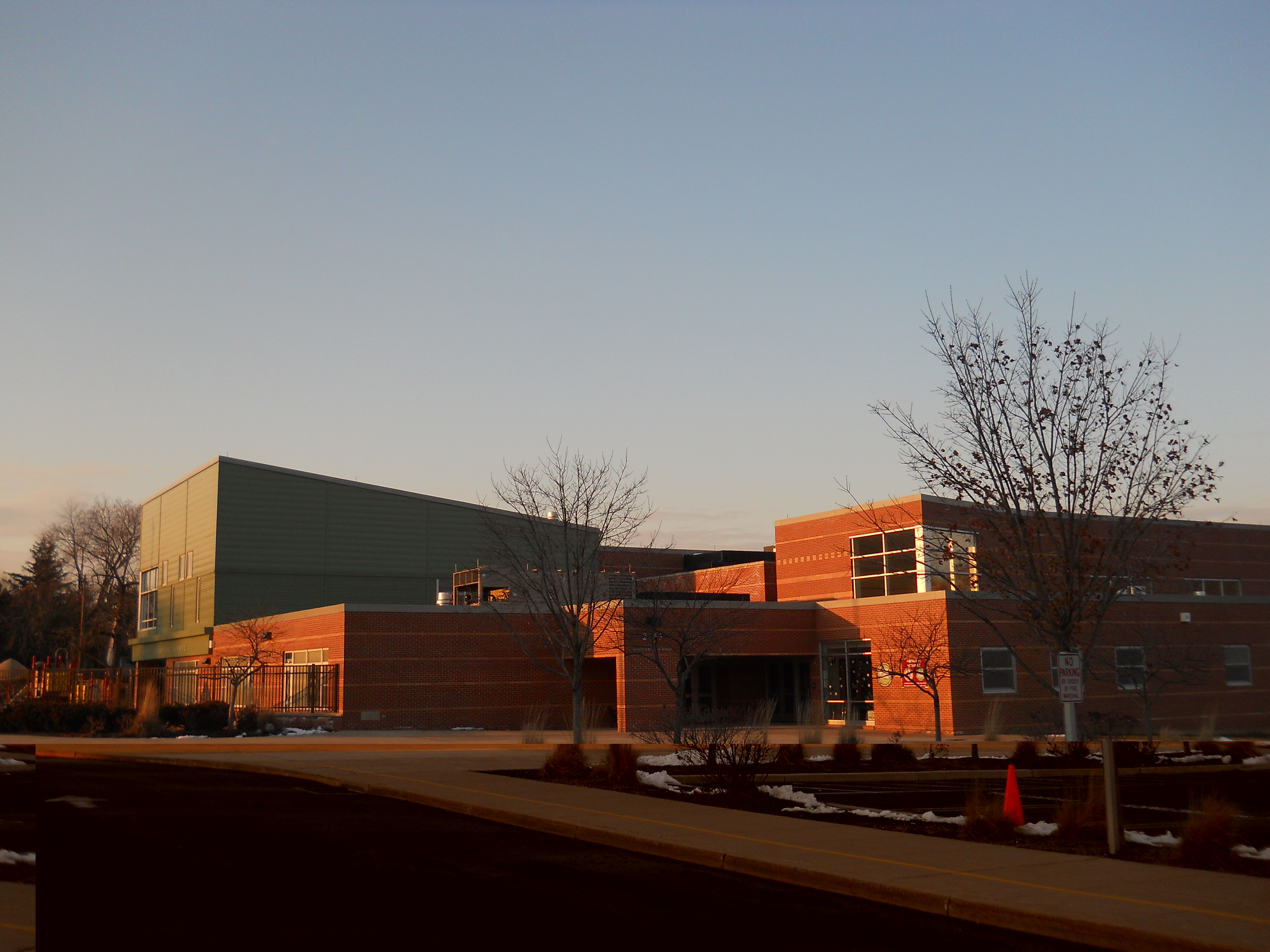
Roslyn Elementary School.

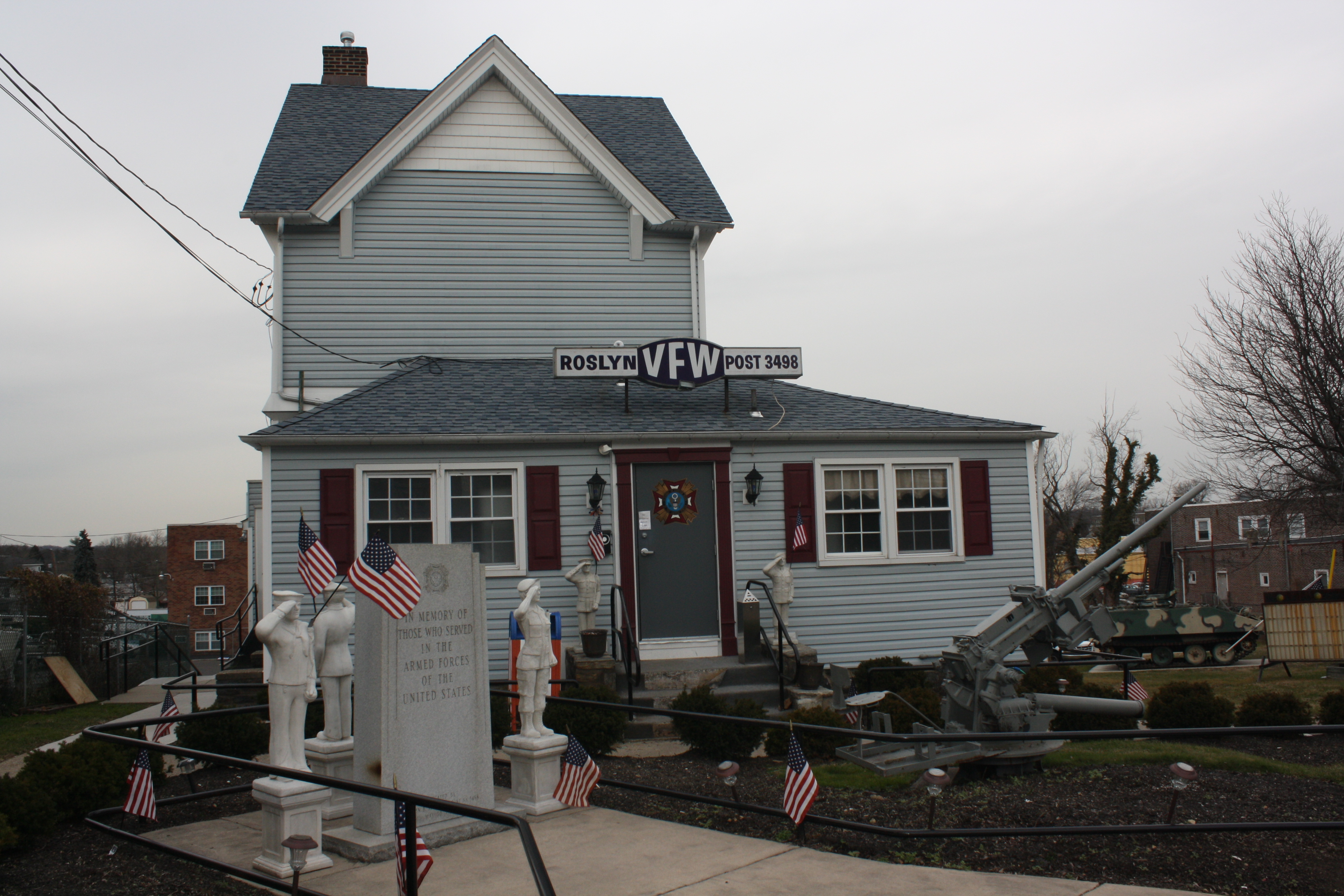
Roslyn VFW Post.
