= Joseph Vittori =

United States Marine Corps Medal of Honor recipient (1929–1951)

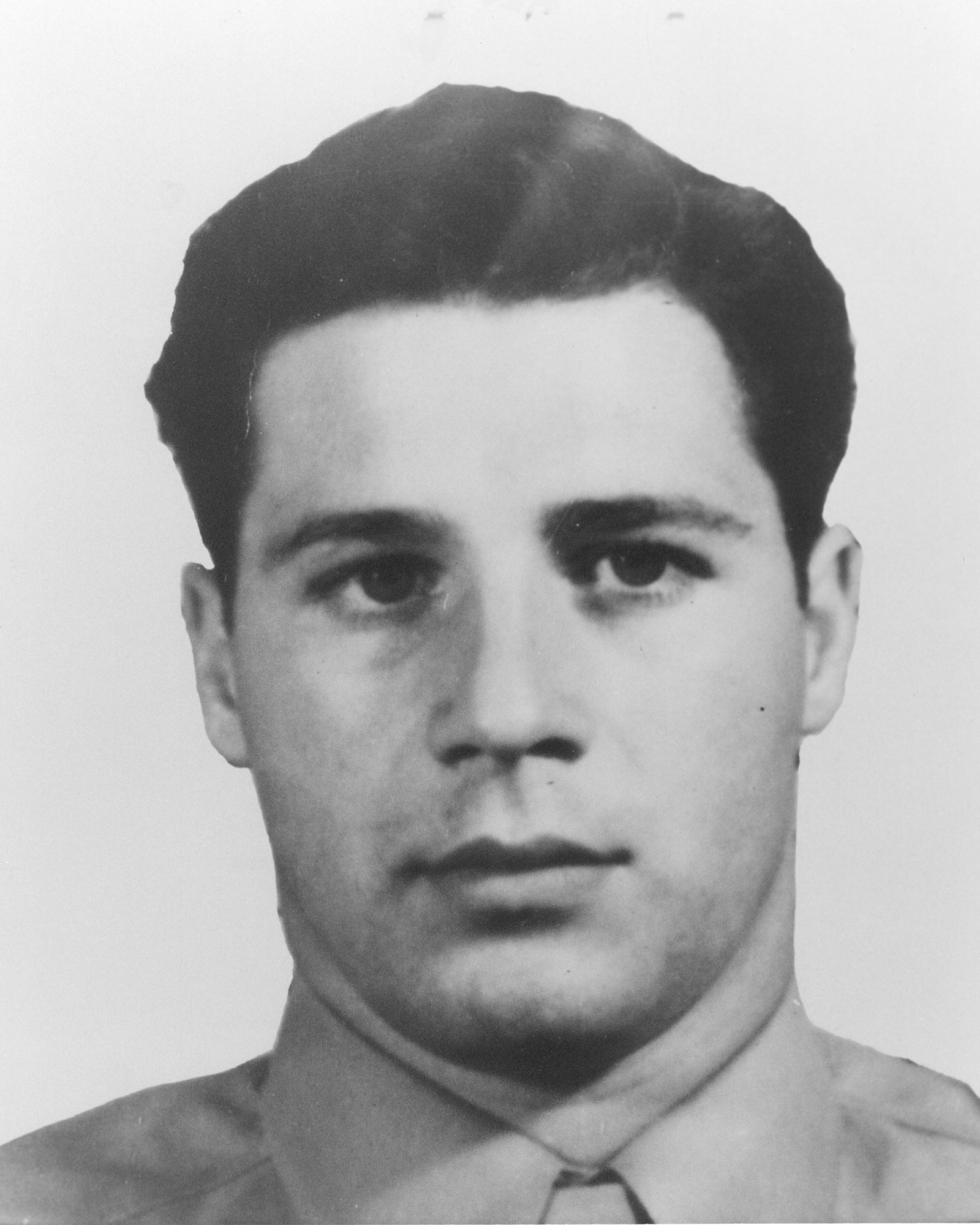
- Born: August 1, 1929; Beverly, Massachusetts, US
- Died: September 16, 1951 (aged 22); Killed in action near Songnae-dong, Korea
- Burial place: initially United Nations military cemetery, Tanggok, Korea later St. Mary’s Cemetery, Beverly, Massachusetts
- Military career
- Allegiance: United States
- Branch: United States Marine Corps
- Service years: 1946–1949, 1950–1951
- Rank: Corporal
- Units: Company F, 2nd Battalion, 1st Marines, 1st Marine Division
- Conflicts: Korean War: Battle of the Punchbowl †
- Awards: Medal of Honor; Purple Heart (x2)

Corporal Joseph Vittori (August 1, 1929 – September 16, 1951) was a 22-year-old United States Marine who was killed in action during the Korean War.

After serving three years in the Marine Corps he returned home, joined the Marine Corps Reserve and worked various jobs around his home town. His unit was called to active duty to participate in the Korean War and after attending some training they were sent to South Korea.

He was killed during the Battle of the Punchbowl while defending against an assault on Hill 749 near Songnea-dong on the night of September 15–16, 1951. He was fatally wounded while fighting off an enemy breakthrough at a gap in his battalion's lines. He was the 19th Marine to earn the nation's highest decoration for heroism in Korea. For his actions he posthumously received the Medal of Honor.

== Early life ==
Vittori was born in Beverly, Massachusetts August 1, 1929 and attended school there until graduating from high school. He worked on his father's farm until October 4, 1946, and then joined the Marine Corps on a three-year enlistment.

== Military career ==
After enlisting he was sent to the Marine Corps Recruit Depot Parris Island in South Carolina where he graduated in December 1946. He served briefly at the Norfolk Naval Shipyard in Norfolk, Virginia and Brooklyn Navy Yard in Brooklyn, New York before being attached to the Marine Detachment aboard the USS Portsmouth from April to June 1947. After sea duty he was then stationed at the Philadelphia Navy Yard until May 1948, when he joined the 2nd Marine Division at Camp Lejeune North Carolina. From January to May 1949, he served with the Sixth Fleet in the Mediterranean area and again served at Camp Lejeune, until October 3, 1949, when he was discharged.

With his service to the Marine Corps over he returned to his hometown of Beverly, Massachusetts and worked for a year as a plasterer and bricklayer until enlisting in the Marine Corps Reserve on September 26, 1950, for an indefinite tour of active duty. He was sent back to Camp Lejeune for training until January 1951, when he arrived in South Korea to join Company F, Second Battalion, First Marines, First Marine Division (Reinforced). He participated in the South and Central Korean campaign, receiving a promotion to corporal on June 15, 1951. On June 9, 1951, he earned his first Purple Heart when was wounded near Yanggu, and after leaving the field hospital, was assigned a position as a property sergeant. After a week at the new job, he asked to rejoin his buddies in his old infantry platoon, and was allowed to do so.

On September 16, 1951, during the Battle of the Punchbowl his company was assaulting Hill 749, where the Korean People's Army had established several entrenched positions. An intense North Korean counter-attack drove back a forward platoon with heavy casualties, and along with two other volunteers from his reserve platoon, he dashed into hand-to-hand combat in the midst of advancing North Korean troops to give the Marine company time to consolidate its positions. Later, when a call went up for an automatic rifleman to defend an isolated heavy machine gun position on the flank of his company's sector, he again volunteered. With heavy casualties leaving a 100-yard (91 m) gap in the Marine lines at the position, he fought a single-handed battle to prevent a North Korean breakthrough. Leaping from one side of the position to the other, he kept up a withering fire of over 1,000 rounds in three hours. He made repeated trips through heavy shellfire to replenish his ammunition, manned a machine gun after its gunner fell, and despite North Korean forces advancing to within a feet of his position, Vittori kept the North Koreans out of the breach in his company's lines until he was killed by a single gunshot wound in the face. The next morning, the Marines counted almost 200 dead North Korean soldiers in the area.

The Medal of Honor was presented to his parents on September 7, 1952.

== Medal of Honor citation ==
The President of the United States in the name of The Congress takes pride in presenting the MEDAL OF HONOR posthumously to

CORPORAL JOSEPH VITTORI
UNITED STATES MARINE CORPS RESERVE

for service as set forth in the following CITATION:

For conspicuous gallantry and intrepidity at the risk of his life above and beyond the call of duty while serving as an Automatic Rifleman in Company F, Second Battalion, First Marines, First Marine Division (Reinforced), in actions against enemy aggressor forces in Korea on 15 and 16 September 1951. With a forward platoon suffering heavy casualties and forced to withdraw under a vicious enemy counterattack as his company assaulted strong hostile forces entrenched on Hill 749, Corporal Vittori boldly rushed through the withdrawing troops with two other volunteers from his reserve platoon and plunged directly into the midst of the enemy. Overwhelming them in a fierce hand-to-hand struggle, he enabled his company to consolidate its positions to meet further imminent on slaughts. Quick to respond to an urgent call for a rifleman to defend a heavy machine gun positioned on the extreme point of the northern flank and virtually isolated from the remainder of the unit when the enemy again struck in force during the night, he assumed position under the devastating barrage and, fighting a singlehanded battle, leaped from one flank to the other, covering each foxhole in turn as casualties continued to mount, manning a machine gun when the gunner was struck down and making repeated trips through the heaviest shellfire to replenish ammunition. With the situation becoming extremely critical, reinforcing units to the rear pinned down under the blistering attack and foxholes left practically void by dead and wounded for a distance of 100 yards (91 m), Corporal Vittori continued his valiant stand, refusing to give ground as the enemy penetrated to within feet of his position, simulating strength in the line and denying the foe physical occupation of the ground. Mortally wounded by enemy machine-gun and rifle bullets while persisting in his magnificent defense of the sector where approximately 200 enemy dead were found the following morning, Corporal Vittori, by his fortitude, stouthearted courage and great personal valor, had kept the point position intact despite the tremendous odds and undoubtedly prevented the entire battalion position from collapsing. His extraordinary heroism throughout the furious night-long battle reflects the highest credit upon himself and the United States Naval Service. He gallantly gave his life for his country.

/S/ HARRY S. TRUMAN

== Awards and Decorations ==
In addition to the Medal of Honor, he received two Purple Hearts for wounds received in action and the following medals.

1st row	Medal of Honor		
2nd row	Purple Heart with 5/16 inch star	Combat Action Ribbon Retroactively Awarded, 1999	World War II Victory Medal
3rd row	Navy Occupation Service Medal with 'Europe' clasp	National Defense Service Medal	Korean Service Medal with 1 Campaign star
4th row	Korean Presidential Unit Citation	United Nations Service Medal Korea	Korean War Service Medal Retroactively Awarded, 2003

== See also ==
- Medal of Honor, Vittori is featured in Season 1, Episode 6
- List of Korean War Medal of Honor recipients
