= Sandy Run (Wissahickon Creek tributary) =

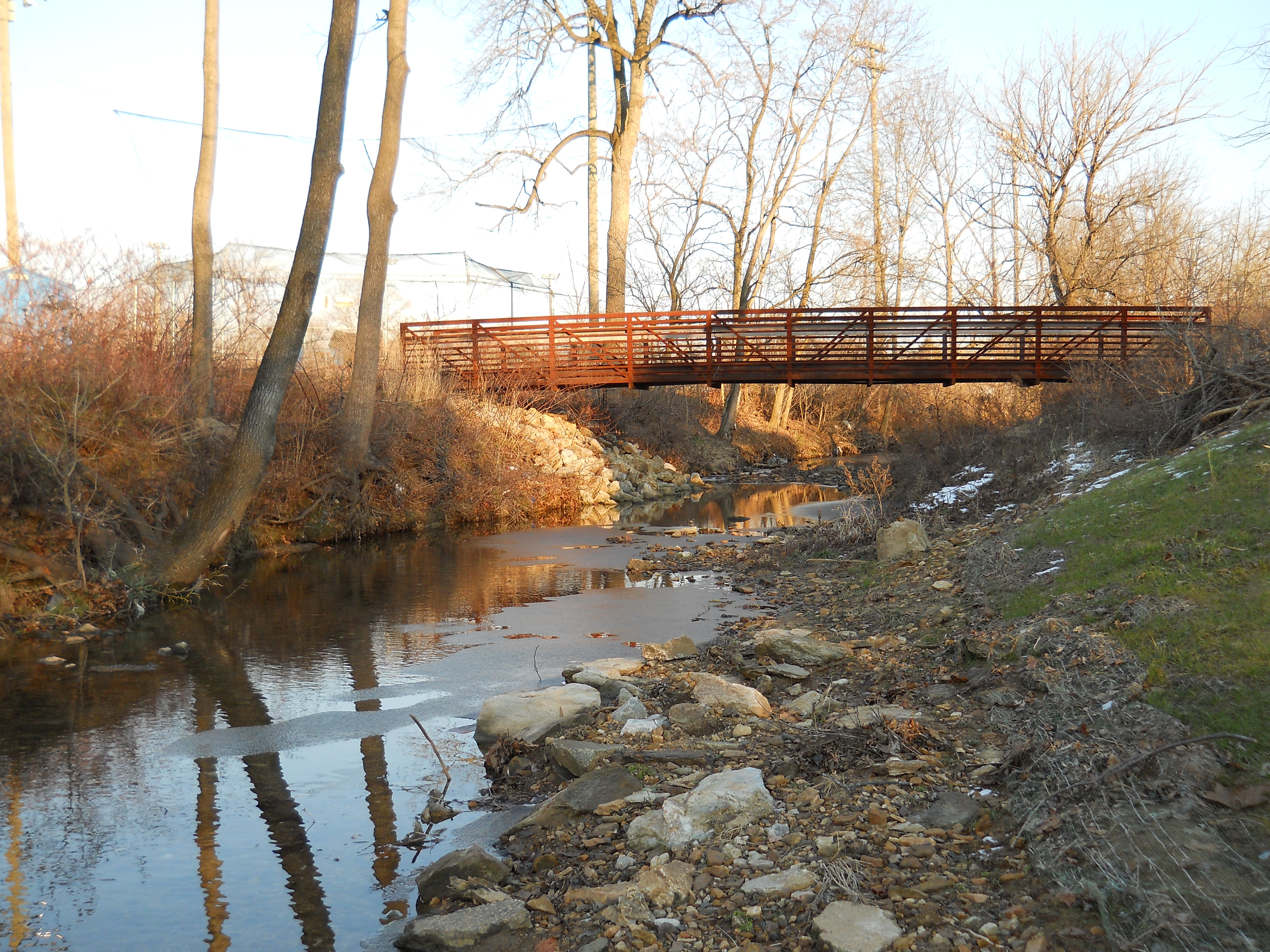
- Sandy Run in Roslyn Park, Roslyn, Pennsylvania

Location
- Country: United States of America

Physical characteristics
- Source
  - coordinates: 40°07′43″N 75°07′32″W
  - elevation: 250 feet (76 m)
- Mouth
  - coordinates: 40°07′48″N 75°13′14″W
  - elevation: 148 feet (45 m)

Sandy Run is a second-order stream (according to the Strahler stream order) that is a tributary to the Wissahickon Creek at Fort Washington State Park. The headwaters are in Dresher and Roslyn, Pennsylvania, and the stream flows west for approximately 6 miles (9.7 km). The stream follows through Abington, Upper Dublin, Springfield, and Whitemarsh Townships; and flows through several golf courses, including Sandy Run Country Club, Lu Lu Country Club, and Manufacturers Country Club. This creek can be fished in some places, mainly between Manufacturer's Country Club and the Wissahickon Creek. Fish that inhabit this creek include Sunfish, Carp, Smallmouth and Largemouth Bass, Catfish, and several other species.

== Tributaries ==
There are no named tributaries.

== See also ==
- List of rivers of Pennsylvania
