= Battle of the Punchbowl =

1951 battle of the Korean War

- Part of the Korean War
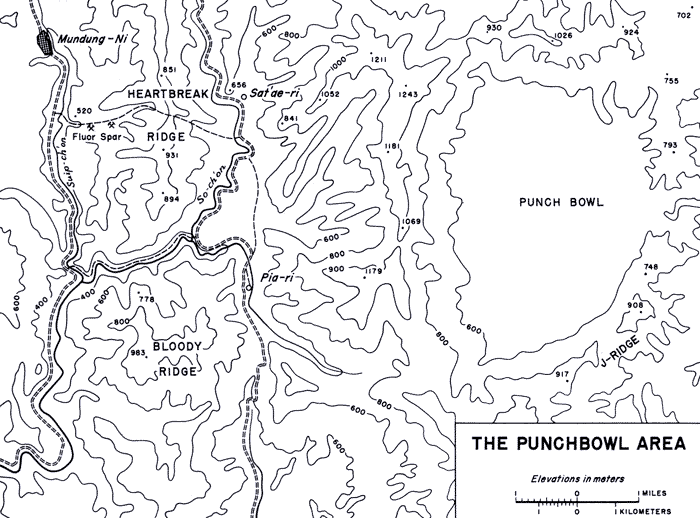
- Map of the Punchbowl, Heartbreak Ridge and Bloody Ridge
Date	31 August – 21 September 1951
Location	The Punchbowl, Haean, Korea
Result	UN tactical victory

Belligerents
United Nations: United States; South Korea	North Korea

Commanders and leaders
(United Nations) Matthew Ridgway (United States) James Van Fleet (United States) Gerald C. Thomas (First Republic of Korea) Kim Dae-shik	Kim Il Sung

Units involved
(United States) X Corps: (United States) 1st Marine Division; (First Republic of Korea) 1st Marine Regiment	II Corps; 1st Division; 2nd Regiment; 3rd Regiment; 14th Regiment; 2nd Division; 6th Regiment; 15th Division; 45th Regiment; 45th Division; 91st Regiment

Strength
30,000	40,000

Casualties and losses
(United States) 69 killed 575 wounded (South Korea) 122 killed 466 wounded	2,799 killed (body count); UN estimate: further 2,374 killed 4,707 wounded

The Battle of the Punchbowl (Korean: 펀치볼 전투), was one of the last battles of the movement phase of the Korean War. Following the breakdown of armistice negotiations in August 1951, the United Nations Command (UN) decided to launch a limited offensive in the late summer/early autumn to shorten and straighten sections of their lines, acquire better defensive terrain, and deny the enemy key vantage points from which they could observe and target UN positions. The Battle of Bloody Ridge took place west of the Haean Basin, known to the UN Forces as the Punchbowl, from August–September 1951 and this was followed by the Battle of Heartbreak Ridge northwest of the Punchbowl from September–October 1951. At the end of the UN offensive in October 1951, UN forces controlled the line of hills north of the Punchbowl.

== Prelude ==
The Chinese People's Volunteer Army (PVA) Spring Offensive was stopped by 20 May 1951 and UN forces counterattacked forcing the PVA back to Line Kansas along the southern edge of the Punchbowl by 20 June.

The first armistice negotiations began at Kaesong on 10 July. The armistice negotiations broke down in August, and the US Eighth Army commander, General James Van Fleet decided to launch a limited offensive to shorten and straighten sections of the lines, acquire better defensive terrain, and deny the enemy key vantage points from which they could observe and target UN positions and coerce the Chinese and North Koreans back to the negotiating table. With the defenses of the Kansas Line largely completed, General Van Fleet decided to convert the combat outpost line, known as the Wyoming Line into an advanced Main line of resistance, where the terrain allowed. The Wyoming Line varied between 2 miles (3.2 km) and 10 miles (16 km) forward of the Kansas Line.

In late August, three regiments of the US 1st Marine Division were given orders to move from their reserve areas around Inje County to support the UN offensive and distract PVA and Korean People's Army (KPA) reinforcements from the Battle of Bloody Ridge. The 1st Marine Division was ordered to attack Yoke Ridge (38°19′26.4″N 128°10′12″E) and advance to a new defensive line to be called the Hays Line, marked by the southern edge of the Soyang River to the north of the Punchbowl. On 30 August, in preparation for the attack, a battalion of 1st Korean Marine Corps Regiment (1st KMC) occupied Hill 793 (38°17′24″N 128°10′12″E) on the eastern edge of the Punchbowl between the Kansas Line and Yoke Ridge.

== Battle ==
=== Phase 1: Yoke Ridge ===
At 06:00 on 31 August, the 7th Marine Regiment and two battalions of the 1st KMC launched the assault with an attack from Hill 793 up the eastern edge of the Punchbowl towards Yoke Ridge in the west and Tonpyong in the east. By late morning, despite heavy rain and enemy minefields, the assault units had reached Yoke Ridge and were engaging the KPA defenders. By the end of the first day, the UN force occupied the southeastern end of Yoke Ridge and had suffered 3 killed and 57 wounded (mostly by landmines), while the KPA had lost 129 killed, a further 218 estimated killed, 233 estimated wounded and 14 captured.

On 1 September, the 1st KMC moved west along Yoke Ridge, while the 7th Marines moved north, both assault groups clearing out KPA bunkers with grenades and flamethrowers. The KPA launched several small-scale counterattacks against the advancing Marines, but these were broken up by small-arms and mortar fire, artillery and several airstrikes. The UN forces consolidated their positions in the evening under KPA mortar and artillery fire. On the night of 1/2 September, the KPA launched a night attack on the 1st KMC on Hill 924, driving them out of the position they had secured earlier that day. UN losses for the day were 21 killed, 84 wounded, while the KPA had lost 72 killed, a further 218 estimated killed and 231 estimated wounded.

On the morning of 2 September, supported by heavy artillery fire, the 1st KMC recaptured Hill 924 and moved further west towards its next objective, Hill 1026 (38°19′28.92″N 128°08′20.4″E). After beating back several small KPA attacks, 3rd Battalion 7th Marines advanced towards Hill 602 (38°20′16.8″N 128°10′51.6″E) through heavily wooded terrain and following preparatory artillery fire and airstrikes, seized the hill by 14:30. The KPA launched several company-size counterattacks on Hill 602, all of which were beaten back. UN losses for the day were 75 killed, 349 wounded, while the KPA had lost 450 killed and 15 captured, a further 609 estimated killed and 345 estimated wounded.

At 04:00 on 3 September, the 1st KMC renewed their attack on Hill 1026, while 2nd Battalion, 7th Marines assumed the defense of Hill 924. As they advanced, the 1st KMC encountered a large KPA force advancing towards Hill 924. The 1st KMC forced back the KPA and seized Hill 1026 by midday, beating back a KPA counterattack and advancing northwest to seize Hill 1055 (38°19′40.8″N 128°07′37.2″E) and west to take Hill 930 (38°19′37.2″N 128°06′54″E), thus securing all of Yoke Ridge. UN losses for the day were 22 killed, 77 wounded, while the KPA had lost 10 captured, a further 294 estimated killed and 280 estimated wounded. Meanwhile, to the west of the Punchbowl, the Republic of Korea Army (ROK) 35th Regiment, 5th Division advanced unopposed from the Kansas Line to Hill 450, approximately 3.3 km southwest of Hill 1026, while the US 2nd Infantry Division took Hill 1181, approximately 4 km southwest of Hill 930, against light resistance.

=== Phase 2: Kanmubong Ridge ===
Between 4–10 September, the 1st Marine Division and 1st KMC consolidated their positions on Yoke Ridge, established the Hays Line and built up ammunition and supplies for the second phase of the attack on Kanmubong Ridge. It was considered essential to seize Kanmubong Ridge, immediately north of Yoke Ridge, in order to defend the Hays Line and to allow US X Corps to attack the KPA main line of resistance, which was believed to be located approximately 3 km north of it. The KPA used the lull in fighting to reinforce their positions on Hill 673 (38°20′52.8″N 128°11′39.48″E) opposite Hill 602. The interim period saw active patrolling by both sides, and UN losses were 30 killed, 186 wounded and two missing, while the KPA had lost 68 captured and an estimated 276 killed.

The 7th Marines received orders to launch an attack at 03:00 on 11 September from the Hays Line through a narrow valley, across a tributary of the Soyang River and then uphill towards Hills 680 (38°21′00″N 128°10′51.6″E) and 673, with Hill 749 (38°21′43.2″N 128°11′39.48″E) as a further objective. Supporting the 7th Marines would be the 1st Tank Battalion with artillery support from the 11th Marine Regiment. 3rd Battalion, 7th Marines were tasked with capturing Hill 680, but despite extensive preparatory artillery fire, their advance proceeded slowly with the KPA defenders able to providing interlocking fire from their bunkers, and by the end of the day, 3/7 Marines were forced to dig in some 300 feet (91 m) south of the summit. 1st Battalion 7th Marines were tasked with capturing Hill 673, but strong opposition from the well-protected KPA bunkers forced them to stop short of their objective. UN losses for the day were 11 killed and 68 wounded while the KPA lost 25 killed and 6 captured.

On the night of 11/12 September, 2/7 Marines moved to the rear of Hill 673, cutting off the KPA on the hill. By 14:00, Hill 673 had been secured for the loss of 16 killed and 35 wounded, while the KPA had lost 30 killed and 3 captured and an estimated 185 killed. Sergeant Frederick W. Mausert III was posthumously awarded the Medal of Honor for his actions during the assault on Hill 673. On the night of 12 September, the 1st Marine Regiment relieved 1/7 and 3/7 Marines on Hill 673; 2/7 Marines could not be relieved, as they were closely engaged on Hill 749, so 2nd Battalion, 1st Marines moved forward to relieve them the following day.

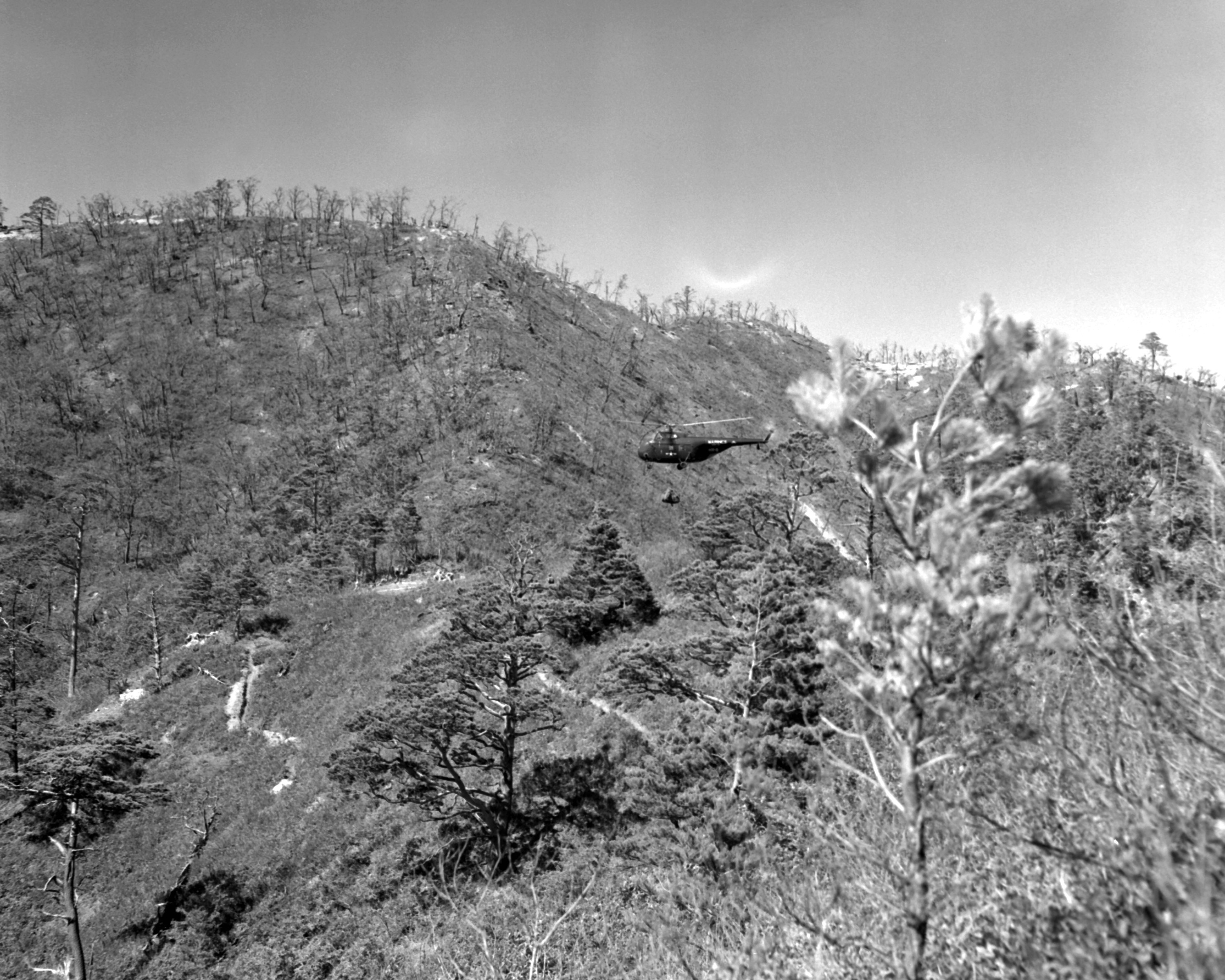
A U.S. Marine Corps HRS delivering supplies near Hill 812.

On 13 September, 2/1 Marines were ordered to seize Hill 749 and then move northwest to take Hills 812 (38°22′4.8″N 128°10′55.2″E), 980 (38°22′19.2″N 128°09′10.8″E), and 1052 (38°22′4.8″N 128°08′42″E), while 3rd Battalion, 1st Marines would move west from Hill 680 to take Hill 751 (38°21′12.6″N 128°09′25.2″E) and then attack northwest to Hill 1052. Hill 749 proved to be a heavily defended fortress of bunkers, covered trenches and tunnels and part of the KPA main line of resistance. 2/1 Marines seized the summit at 12:10, but were soon driven back; they finally gained control of the summit by 15:00, but it would be 20:25 before they could relieve 2/7 Marines on the reverse slope of the hill. 3/1 Marines' advance towards Hill 751 was delayed by mines and the more urgent needs for supporting arms on Hill 749; by evening, 3/1 Marines dug in short of Hill 751, where they endured mortar fire and 10 KPA counterattacks during the night. 13 September saw the first operational use of Marine helicopters in combat, with the HRS-1 helicopters of HMR-161, operating from forward base X-83 near Cheondo-ri, conducting 28 flights to resupply the Marines near Hill 793 and evacuate 74 casualties.

On 14 September, the two Marine battalions continued their assaults from the previous day. 2/1 Marines had to clear KPA bunkers in a wooded area to the north of Hill 749 before advancing along the ridgeline towards Hill 812. By 15:30, the attack had bogged down in the face of frontal and flanking fire. During this assault, Private First Class Edward Gomez smothered a KPA hand grenade with his body, saving the lives of the rest of his machine-gun team, for which he was posthumously awarded the Medal of Honor. 3/1 Marines, supported by accurate airstrikes, was able to seize most of Hill 751 by dusk and had dug in when the KPA counterattacked at 22:50. Marine losses for the day were 39 killed and 463 wounded, while the KPA lost 7 captured and an estimated 460 killed and 405 wounded.

In the early morning of 15 September, 3/1 Marines fought off a 100–150 man KPA counterattack, killing 18 and wounding an estimated 50. Another KPA counterattack was broken up 14:50 and Marine tanks subsequently destroyed 10 KPA bunkers in front of Hill 751. 3/1 Marines on Hill 751 were ordered to hold for further orders, while 2/1 Marines was ordered to continue clearing Hill 749. Delayed preparatory fire, limited air support, and a tenacious KPA defense meant that 2/1 Marines were unable to make any appreciable gains by nightfall and had to withdraw to their previous positions, having suffered 70 wounded. On the night of 15 September, the 5th Marine Regiment moved forward to relieve the 1st Marines and continue the assault on the Kanmubong Ridge.

At midnight on 16 September, under cover of an intense mortar and artillery barrage, the KPA 91st Regiment of the 45th Division launched a major counterattack against Hill 749; the attacks continued until 04:00, but were repeatedly repulsed for few gains and an estimated 1200 KPA killed. Corporal Joseph Vittori was posthumously awarded the Medal of Honor for his actions in countering the KPA assault. At dawn, 2/1 Marines resumed the assault from Hill 749 to Hill 812 making slow progress against the KPA dug in along the ridgeline. On Hill 751, 5th Marines were ordered to take Hill 812 and Hill 980 and began their assault at 08:30, however both the assault lines made little progress in the face of KPA machine gun, mortar and artillery fire. 3rd Battalion, 5th Marines attacking towards Hill 980 had to pull back to their line of departure after 2 hours, while 2nd Battalion, 5th Marines attacking towards Hill 812 were held up until 17:00, but by 19:00 had managed to secure ground 400m southeast of Hill 812. Marine losses for the day were 24 killed, 127 wounded and 1 missing, while the KPA had lost 169 killed and 25 captured and an estimated 418 killed and 540 wounded.

Orders for 17 September were to continue the previous day's assaults. A dawn artillery barrage on Hills 812, 980 and 1052 inflicted significant casualties on the KPA defenders, who were eating meals in the open. 2/5 Marines advanced towards Hill 812 at 07:00 making good progress against until a KPA mortar and artillery barrage fell on the recently captured positions, the Marines then had to advance slowly neutralizing the KPA bunkers one by one. By 13:45, the summit of Hill 812 had been secured, but the KPA remained dug in on the reverse slope and had to be cleared out in close-quarters fighting. After securing Hill 812, 1/5 and 2/5 Marines began to attack west towards Hill 980, making good progress against the unprepared KPA defenders until they reached a granite point later named The Rock, where heavy machine gun fire from KPA bunkers on Hills 980 and 1052 stopped any further advance. The 5th Marines were then ordered to halt their attack and dig in on the most defensible terrain. The previous day, General Van Fleet had visited the 1st Marine Division Command Post and then ordered X Corps to suspend all major operations after 20 September, as further attacks along the Hays Line could no longer be justified, and he wished to concentrate all of X Corps' fire support to conclude the Battle of Heartbreak Ridge. Marine losses for the day were 13 killed and 88 wounded, while the KPA had lost 155 killed and 37 captured and an estimated 100 killed and 191 wounded.

On 18 September, the Marines dug in and consolidated their positions, while the KPA launched several counterattacks and continued to fire from their dominating positions on Hills 980 and 1052. Marine losses were 16 killed and 98 wounded.

On the early morning of 19 September, the KPA twice attacked 2/5 Marines' western outpost near The Rock, but the attacking forces stumbled into their own minefield, suffering serious losses. Marine losses for the day were 16 killed and 98 wounded, while the KPA lost 9 captured and an estimated 50 killed and 55 wounded.

After midnight on 20 September, the KPA launched an intense mortar and artillery barrage on the Marines between The Rock and Hill 812. At 02:30, the barrage lifted and a company of KPA attacked past The Rock towards Hill 812, cutting off several outpost units. American artillery responded, firing over 1600 rounds between 02:40 and 04:50. The Marines counterattacked at 05:00, forcing the KPA to withdraw, allowing the Marines to reoccupy their original positions by 06:30. Marine losses in the attack and counterattack were 2 killed and 31 wounded, while the KPA had lost 30 dead and 11 captured and an estimated 20 killed and 15 wounded

Also on 20 September, east of the Kanmubong Range, the ROK 8th Infantry Division was struggling to secure Hill 854 (38°22′37.2″N 128°13′44.4″E). 1st Marines were ordered to assist the 8th ROK, but the attack did not begin until 17:30 and quickly bogged down in the face of well-defended KPA bunkers. 1st Marines began to dig in at 17:00, having gained only a small amount of ground for the loss of 7 killed and 24 wounded. On 21 September, 3/1 Marines resumed the assault on Hill 854, and by 17:45, it had been secured for the loss of 2 killed and 31 wounded. KPA losses on Hill 854 were 159 killed and 29 captured with an estimated 150 killed and 225 wounded.

== Aftermath ==
The UN offensive in the Punchbowl area concluded on 21 September, however the KPA continued to probe the UN lines and direct fire on their positions. Following the conclusion of the Battle of Heartbreak Ridge to the west, UN forces consolidated their positions and the line of hills north of the Punchbowl formed part of the new frontline, now named the Minnesota Line. The failure to press on and capture Hills 980 and 1052 was viewed by many Marines as a tactical error as those heights overlooked the UN lines and numerous casualties resulted in the stalemate period that followed.

The KPA captured Hill 812 from the ROK 12th Division in June 1953.

The Korean Demilitarized Zone now runs along the line of hills captured by the UN forces in September 1951. The Eulji Observatory is located on Yoke Ridge looking directly across to the Kanmubong Ridge in North Korea.
