= Dresher, Pennsylvania =

Unincorporated community in Pennsylvania, US

Dresher
- Unincorporated community
- Location of Dresher in Pennsylvania Dresher (the United States)
- Coordinates: 40°08′27″N 75°10′01″W
- Country: United States
- State: Pennsylvania
- County: Montgomery
- Township: Upper Dublin

Area
  - Total: 3.24 sq mi (8.4 km^{2})
  - Land: 3.24 sq mi (8.4 km^{2})
  - Water: 0.0 sq mi (0 km^{2})
- Elevation: 203 ft (62 m)

Population (2000)
  - Total: 5,610
  - Density: 1,730/sq mi (669/km^{2})
- Time zone: UTC-5 (EST)
  - Summer (DST): UTC-4 (EDT)
- ZIP Code: 19025
- Area codes: 215, 267, and 445

Dresher (previously Dreshertown) is a community in Upper Dublin Township, Montgomery County, Pennsylvania. The population was 5,610 at the 2000 census. Because Dresher is neither an incorporated area nor a census-designated place, all statistics are for the ZIP Code 19025, with which the community is coterminous.

== History ==
Dreshertown developed around a sawmill and gristmill built by John Kirk sometime before 1750. George Dresher bought the mill about 1780 and the family owned it for 54 years. The Dreshers began a small burial ground next to their residence. The Dreshertown Cemetery is mostly descendants of Christopher Dresher, an early Schwenkfelder immigrant. The family left Silesia, a province in the German kingdom of Prussia, in 1726 to escape religious persecution as Schwenkfelders. They first landed in England, and in 1734, left Plymouth, England, and arrived in Philadelphia with their children, Christopher and Anna, on the St. Andrews, one of three ships carrying Schwenkfelders,

Bean's 1884 History of Montgomery County, Pennsylvania describes Dreshertown as follows:

"Dreshertown is situated at the intersection of the Limekiln turnpike with the Susquehanna Street road, and equidistant from Fitzwatertown and Jarrettown. As these two highways are ancient, they must denote an early settlement. It contains a store, grist-mill and eleven houses. A post-office was established here in 1832..."

An old blacksmith shop stood at the corner of Dresher Road and Limekiln Pike. Francis Houpt ran a general store beginning in 1871 at the village center: the triangle formed by Peg Street, Susquehanna Road and Limekiln Pike. In the 1880s, the McCormick Brothers were wheelwrights and blacksmiths at a shop at this intersection that was owned first by Michael Carolan (1844-1906), an Irish immigrant born near Kells, County Meath, who came, at age three, with his family to New York aboard the Patrick Henry.

The Pennsylvania Railroad built a line through Dreshertown in 1888 and a station stood where Susquehanna Road and Limekiln Pike cross.

== Geography ==
According to the U.S. Census Bureau, the community has a total area of 3.24 square miles (8.4 km^{2}), all land. The headwaters for Sandy Run, a tributary of Wissahickon Creek are located in Dresher.

Dresher is located north of Philadelphia and is adjacent to the Pennsylvania Turnpike (Interstate 276).

== Demographics ==
At the 2000 census, there were 5,610 people, 1,765 households, and 1,538 families in the community. The population density was 1,734.04/sq mi. There were 1,830 housing units at an average density of 564.67/sq mi. The racial make-up was 89.9% White, 1.0% African American, 0.7% Native American, 6.8% Asian, 0.0% Pacific Islander, 0.8% from other races, and 0.8% from two or more races. Hispanic or Latino of any race were 1.2% of the population.

Out of the 1,765 households, 47.6% had children under the age of 18 living with them, 80.4% were married couples living together, 2.3% had a female householder with no husband present, and 12.9% were non-families. 12.0% of households were made up of individuals. The average household size was 3.05 and the average family size was 3.31.

The age distribution was 30.1% under the age of 18, 4.8% from 18 to 24, 23.1% from 25 to 44, 30.7% from 45 to 64, and 11.3% 65 or older. The median age was 39.8 years. For every 100 females, there were 96 males. For every 100 females age 18 and over, there were 93 males.

The median household income was $99,231 and the median family income was $107,236. Males had a median income of $82,897 versus $35,316 for females. The per capita income for the community was $38,865. 2.1% of the population and 2.1% of families were below the poverty line.

== Notable people ==
- Zach Pfeffer, American soccer player
- Josh Shapiro, Governor of Pennsylvania
- Michael Sowers, Professional Lacrosse Player
