= Haean =

- myeon
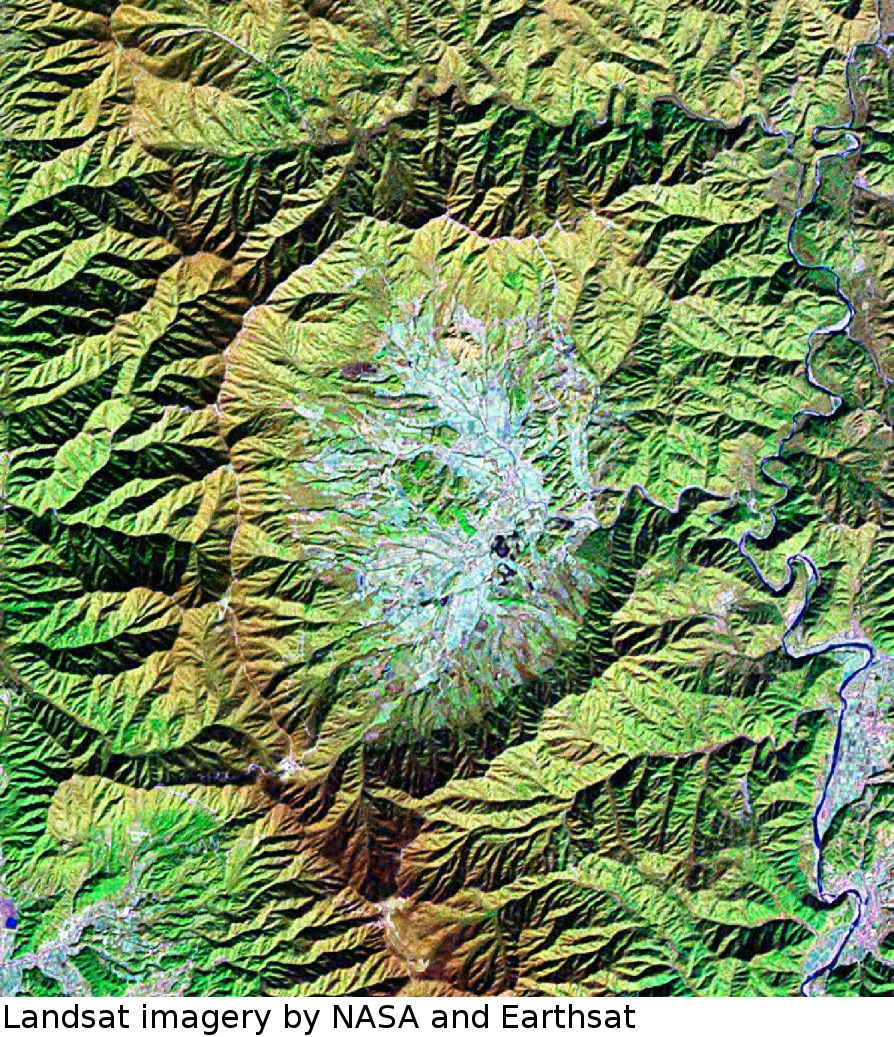

- Location within South Korea
- Coordinates: 38°17′2″N 128°7′31″E
- Country: South Korea
- Administrative divisions: 6 ri

Area
  - Total: 61.50 km^{2} (23.75 sq mi)

Population (2001)
  - Total: 1,566
  - Density: 25.46/km^{2} (65.95/sq mi)

Korean name
- Hangul: 해안면
- Hanja: 亥安面
- RR: Haean-myeon
- MR: Haean-myŏn

Haean is a township (myeon) in Yanggu County, Gangwon-do, South Korea. Haean sits in the distinctive Haean Basin (해안분지), which was nicknamed The Punchbowl by UN forces during the Korean War. The northern part of the basin lies within the Demilitarized Zone, and the area saw heavy fighting during the war.

== Geography ==
The mountain Daeamsan (1304 m) is on the southern border of Haean Myeon.

The central region of the basin is composed of Jurassic granite, with a pre-Cambrian metamorphic complex towards the edge. The basin may have been formed by differential weathering of the rock.

== Economy ==
Farms within Haean produce potatoes, green vegetables, and lilies.

== History ==
During the Koryo Dynasty Haean was known as Beonhwa (번화). It was renamed to Haean in 1885.

=== Korean War ===
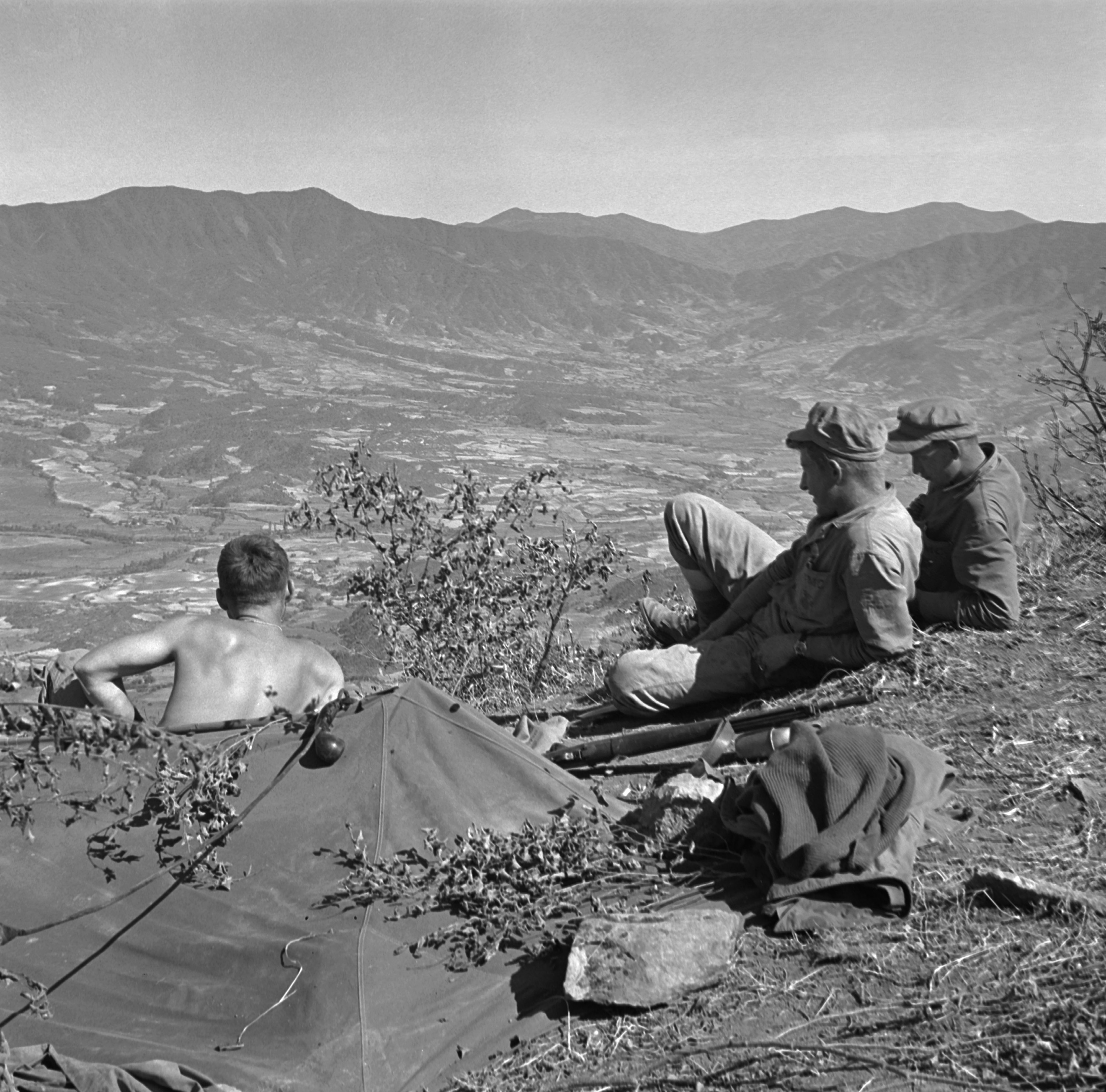
United States Marines on a ridge overlooking the Haean Basin during the Battle of the Punchbowl

As Haean lies north of the 38th parallel, it was controlled by North Korea before the start of the war. The North Korean army based artillery in the protection of the valley, making its capture an important objective for the UN forces. The Republic of Korea Army and the US Eighth Army captured the basin in the Battle of the Punchbowl on August 27, 1951.

=== Fourth tunnel ===
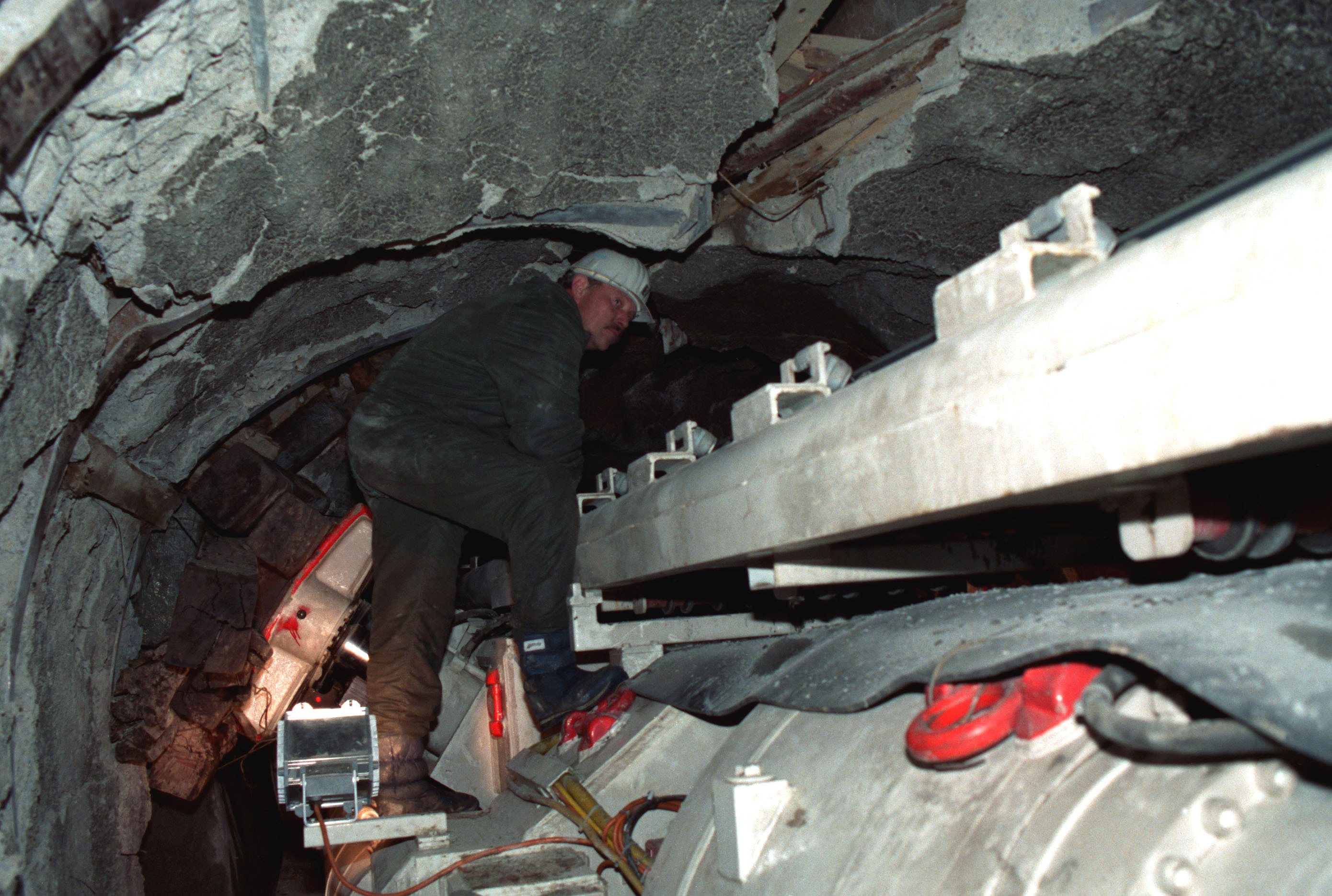
Digging in 1990 of the countertunnel to join the incomplete tunnel

The fourth "tunnel of aggression" was discovered on March 3, 1990, in the northern part of Haean Myeon, which borders North Korean territory. It is a deep tunnel dug from the northern side within the demilitarized zone, passing under the armistice line. Three similar tunnels were found between 1974 and 1978, all farther west and closer to the South Korean capital, Seoul. The tunnel was found at a depth of 145 m and was explored through a borehole and a countertunnel, since the tunnel was incomplete and did not yet have an entrance on the southern side. The tunnel is estimated to be over a mile long and to extend at least 4000 feet on the southern side of the demarcation line. South Korea alleged that the North Korean military dug the tunnel in preparation for an invasion of the South, violating the terms of the cease-fire agreement of 1953.

== Culture ==
Haean hosts the Yanggu War Memorial Museum, which opened in 2000, and the Eulji Unification Observatory.

The Greetingman sculpture by artist Yoo Young-ho was unveiled in Haean in 2013.
