= Punchbowl (Korean War) =

Basin and Korean War battlefield in South Korea

Haean Basin
- The Punchbowl
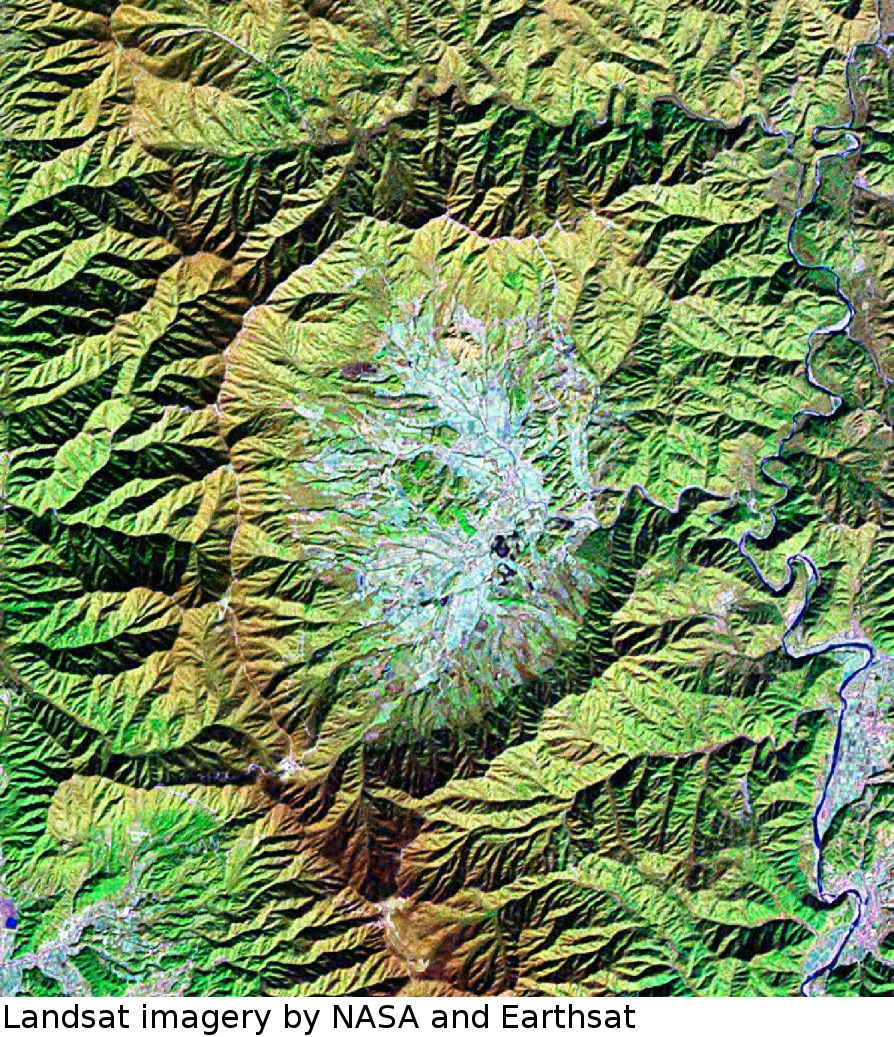

- Location within South Korea

Geography
- Location: Haean, Yanggu County, Gangwon
- Country: Republic of Korea
- Coordinates: 38°17′06″N 128°8′24″E
- Interactive map of Haean Basin

Korean name
- Hangul: 해안분지
- Hanja: 亥安盆地
- RR: Haean bunji
- MR: Haean punji

The Punchbowl (Korean: 펀치볼) was the name given to the bowl-shaped Haean Basin (해안분지) in Yanggu County, Gangwon Province by United Nations (UN) Forces during the Korean War. The Punchbowl lies several km south of the Korean Demilitarized Zone.

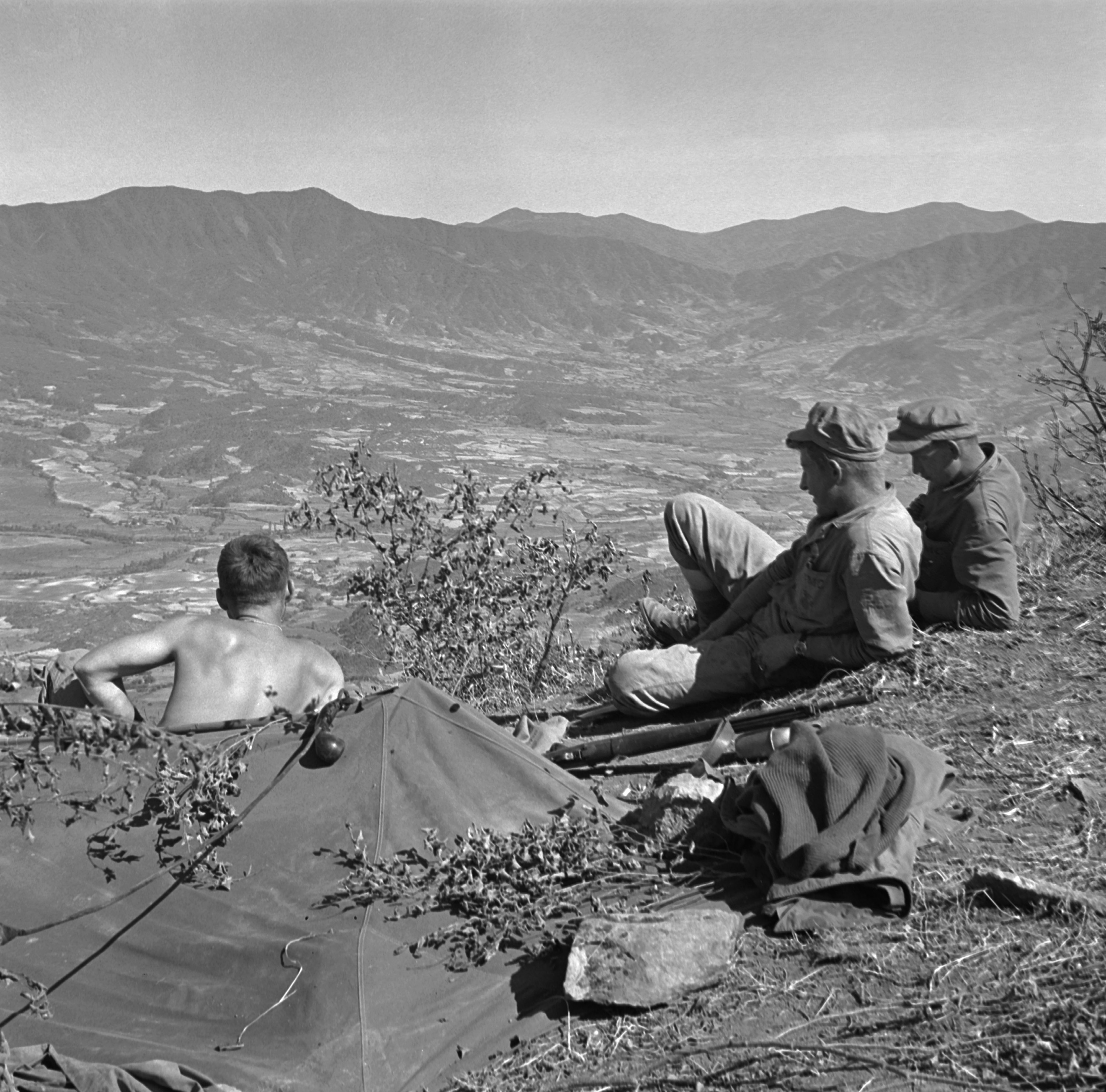
Marines of the 1st Marine Division relax in a position overlooking the Punchbowl

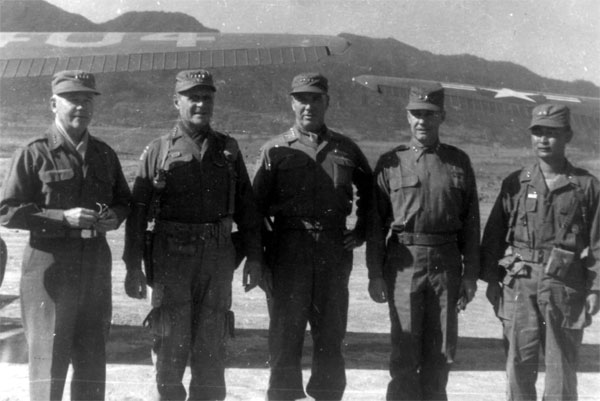
Inspection by leading figures of UN Forces nearby the Punchbowl. (Left to right: Gen. J. Lawton Collins, Gen. Matthew Ridgway, Gen. James Van Fleet, X Corps commander Maj. Gen. Clovis E. Byers, Maj. Gen. Paik Sun-yup)

== History ==
The Punchbowl, north of the 38th parallel, was part of North Korea in the opening days of the Korean War. It was captured by UN forces in late September 1950 during the UN offensive that followed the Inchon landings and the breakout from the Pusan perimeter. UN Forces abandoned the region in mid-December 1950, during the withdrawal following the Chinese People's Volunteer Army intervention in the war.

On 4 June 1951 the 1st Marine Division and the ROK 5th Infantry Division began to advance north of Inje towards the Punchbowl and the Hwacheon Reservoir. By 10 June the Marine/ROKA force had secured Line Kansas northeast of the Hwacheon Reservoir and the southern line of hills overlooking the Punchbowl.

Following the breakdown of armistice negotiations in August 1951, the United Nations Command decided to launch a limited offensive in the late summer/early autumn to shorten and straighten sections of their lines, acquire better defensive terrain, and deny the enemy key vantage points from which they could observe and target UN positions. The Battle of Bloody Ridge took place west of the Punchbowl from August to September 1951 and this was followed by the Battle of Heartbreak Ridge northwest of the Punchbowl from September to October 1951. Meanwhile, the 1st Marine Division reinforced by the Korean Marine Corps Regiment captured the line of hills north of the Punchbowl in the Battle of the Punchbowl from 31 August to 20 September 1951.

The Yanggu War Memorial Hall (양구전쟁기념관) is located in Haean town.

The 4th Infiltration Tunnel and the Eulji Observatory are located in the hills north of Haean town.

== See also ==
- Battle of the Punchbowl
- 1956 Punchbowl avalanche
