= Michael Sowers =

Private Michael A. Sowers
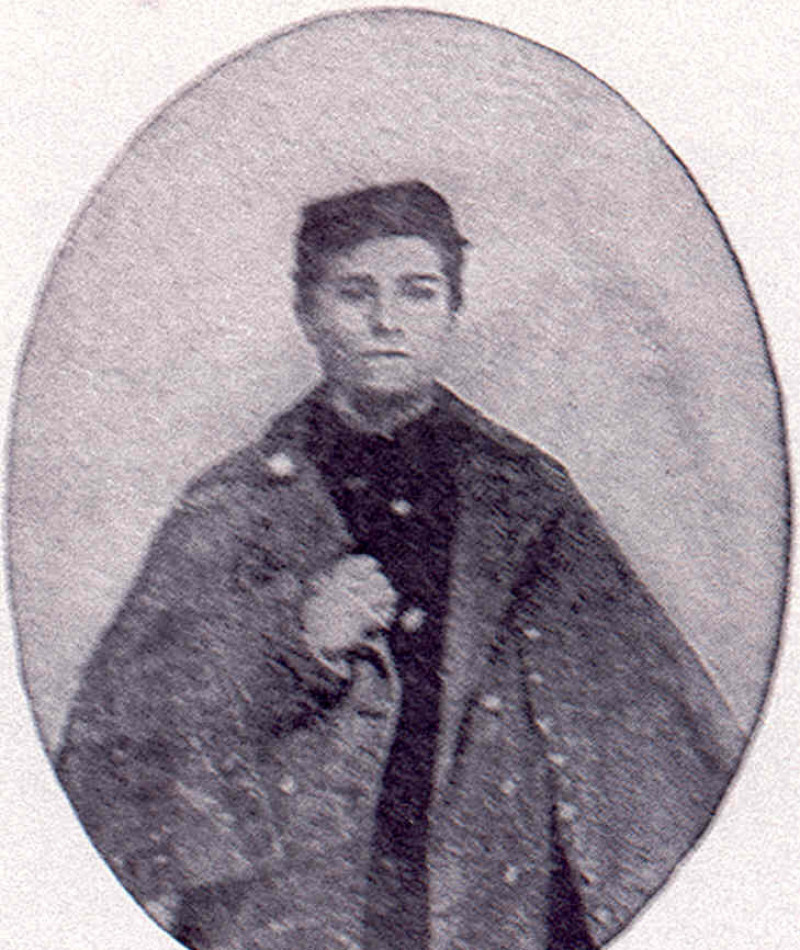
- Born: Michael Sauers; 14 September 1844; Pittsburgh, Pennsylvania
- Died: 7 January 1920 (aged 75); Findley, Pennsylvania
- Burial place: Saint Columbkille Cemetery, Imperial, Pennsylvania
- Military career
- Allegiance: United States (Union)
- Branch: Army
- Service years: 1864–1865
- Rank: Private
- Units: Company L, 41st Pennsylvania Cavalry
- Conflicts: Stony Creek Station, Virginia
- Awards: Medal of Honor

Michael A. Sowers (also known as Michael A. Sauers, 14 September 1844 – 7 January 1920) was a private in the United States Army who was awarded the Medal of Honor for gallantry in the American Civil War. Sowers was awarded the medal on 16 February 1897 for actions performed at the Battle of Stony Creek Depot in Virginia in 1864.

== Personal life ==
Sowers was born in Pittsburgh, Pennsylvania on 14 September 1844. He died on 7 January 1920 in Findley, Pennsylvania, and is buried in Saint Columbkille Cemetery in Imperial, Pennsylvania.

== Military service ==
Sowers enlisted in the Army as a private on 4 March 1864 in Pittsburgh. He was assigned to Company L of the 41st Pennsylvania Cavalry. On 1 December 1864, during the Battle of Stony Creek Depot, Sowers had his horse shot out from under him but continued with his charge on foot, eventually being one of the first Union soldiers to enter the Confederate fortifications at Stony Creek.

Sowers later recounted the experience, saying:

It was like this ... my regiment and the Sixteenth Pennsylvania Cavalry were marched down the public road to a distance of about 500 yards from the fort, which was built of mud and logs. Then we

separated, the Sixteenth going to the right, we to the left, to make a simultaneous attack. We charged. All of a sudden my horse dropped forward on his knees to rise no more. That was the third horse killed under me within a short time, I was mad as a hornet and, resolving to make some rebels pay for this last loss, slipped off the back of the gallant little animal, took my Spencer and, running ahead of the encircling cavalry, made for the fort. Of course, I had no right to do that; but I was enraged and had but one object in view, to get even with those infernal Johnnies who were killing my horses. A lot of grape and canister came my way, but not close enough to injure me, so on I went right into the fort. I do not claim that I was the first one to enter upon rebel ground-I was too excited to look about me. I do know, however, that I was one of the first, and that as soon as I was inside of the fort I emptied my gun into the rebels

with telling effect. The Sixteenth Pennsylvania stormed the fort from the other side, and together we made ourselves masters of the rebel stronghold.

— Michael A. Sowers, Deeds of Valor, pg 465

This action won Sowers the Medal of Honor. His medal citation reads:

The President of the United States of America, in the name of Congress, takes pleasure in presenting the Medal of Honor to Private Michael Sowers, United States Army, for extraordinary heroism on 1 December 1864, while serving with Company L, 4th Pennsylvania Cavalry, in action at Stony Creek Station, Virginia. His horse having been shot from under him, Private Sowers voluntarily and on foot participated in the cavalry charge made upon one of the forts, conducting himself throughout with great personal bravery.

— D. S. Lamont, Secretary of War

Sowers was mustered out of the Army on 1 July 1865 at Lynchburg, Virginia.
