= Kenneth J. Houghton =

United States Marine Corps officer

Kenneth John Houghton
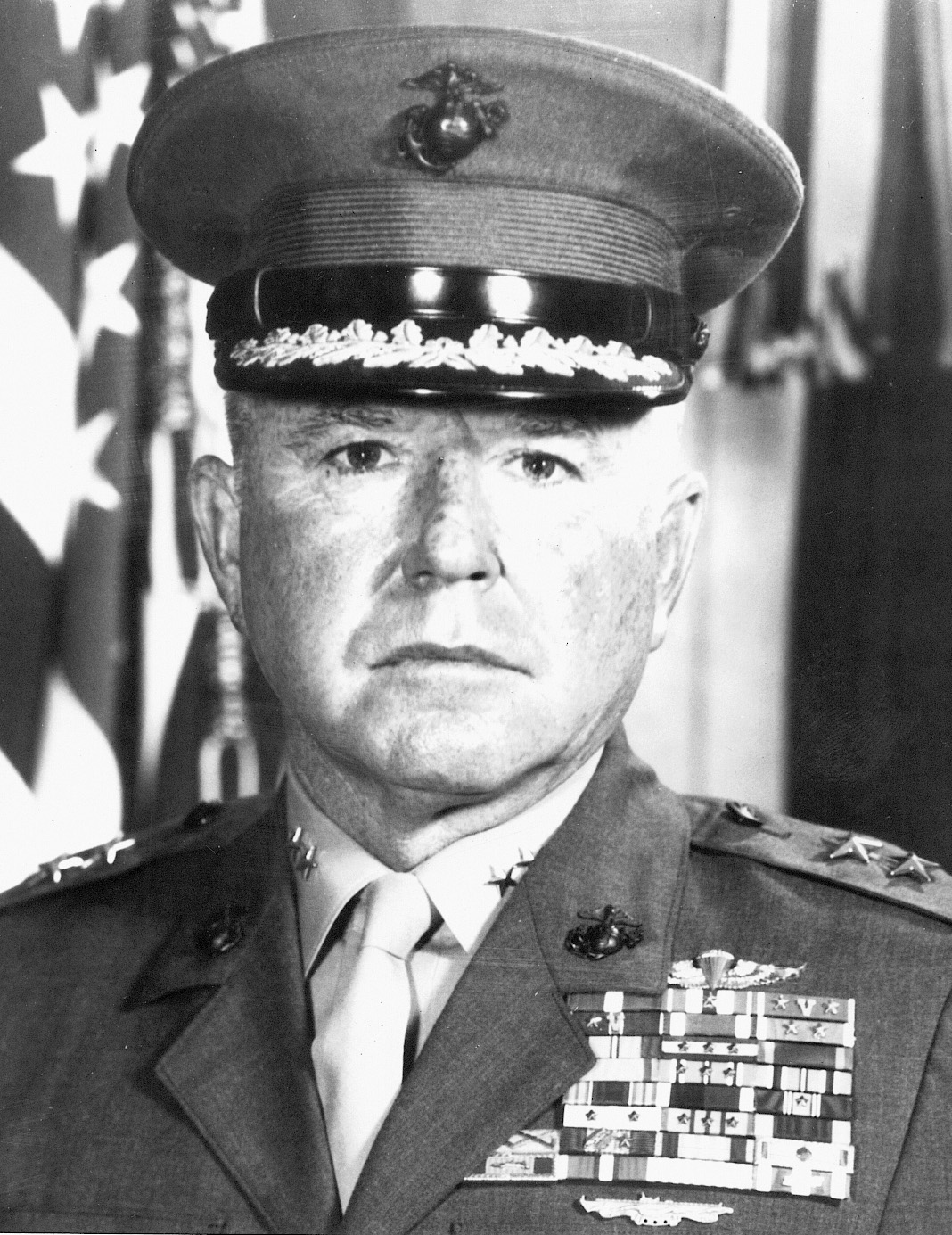
- Born: October 17, 1920; San Francisco, California, U.S.
- Died: March 27, 2006 (aged 85) La Jolla, California, U.S.
- Buried: Fort Rosecrans National Cemetery; San Diego, California
- Allegiance: United States
- Branch: United States Marine Corps
- Service years: 1942–1977
- Rank: Major General
- Commands: 5th Marine Regiment; 1st Marine Division; 3rd Marine Division; Marine Corps Recruit Depot San Diego
- Conflicts: World War II: Battle of Tarawa; Battle of Saipan; Korean War: Battle of Pusan Perimeter; Battle of Inchon; Vietnam War: Operation Union; Operation Union II
- Awards: Navy Cross; Silver Star (2); Legion of Merit (3); Bronze Star Medal (2); Purple Heart (3)

Kenneth John Houghton (October 17, 1920 – March 27, 2006) was a highly decorated officer in the United States Marine Corps with the rank of major general.

== Early Marine Corps career ==
Kenneth J. Houghton was born in San Francisco, California, on October 17, 1920. He graduated from Polytechnic High School in 1938 and then attended the University of San Francisco. After graduating with a bachelor's degree in Political Science and Economics, Houghton enlisted in the Marines on April 15, 1942. He was commissioned as a second lieutenant on September 26.

Houghton was attached to the 2nd Marine Division and was promoted to first lieutenant, taking part in the battle of Tarawa in November 1943 and later the Battle of Saipan in mid 1944. He was promoted to captain on December 31, 1944.

== Korean War ==
When the Korean War broke out, Captain Houghton was attached to the 1st Provisional Marine Brigade and took part in the Battle of Pusan Perimeter in August 1950. He then took part in the amphibious assault at Inchon in September. On September 19, he led a reconnaissance patrol across the Han River to an enemy held shore line. While the patrol swam to the shore, they came under heavy fire and Houghton was wounded. Despite his wounds, he managed to lead his Marines back across the river while under fire to safety. He was awarded his first Silver Star for his actions that day. He was later wounded again in October and was evacuated from the field. He remained in a hospital until January 1951, when he was also promoted to major.

In 1962, Houghton attended the Army War College and earned a master's degree in Political Science from George Washington University. He was promoted to colonel on July 1, 1964.

== Vietnam War ==
In February 1967, Colonel Houghton deployed to Vietnam where he took command of the 5th Marines. He then took part in Operation Union, in which the 21st North Vietnamese Regiment was decimated near the Quế Sơn Valley, from April to May of that year. He was awarded his second Silver Star for his actions during Operation Union.

On May 26, 1967, Colonel Houghton led the 5th Marines in a helicopter assault, commencing Operation Union II. The mission was to destroy the remnants of the 21st NVA Regiment. Houghton committed two of his battalions, 1/5 and 3/5, and succeeded in annihilating the enemy despite heavy resistance. When Colonel Houghton was informed another large enemy force was in the area, he ordered 1/5 and 3/5 to sweep the region. On June 2, the two battalions made contact with the 3rd NVA Regiment and came under heavy fire and took heavy casualties. Houghton sent his reserve battalion, 2/5, to attack the enemy's flank. Company F was nearly decimated, and the commanding officer, Captain James A. Graham, was awarded a posthumous Medal of Honor. Despite being wounded himself, Houghton led his regiment in destroying the enemy force. For his actions during Operation Union II, he was awarded the Navy Cross.

== Later career ==
Colonel Houghton left Vietnam in February 1968. On August 21 of that year, he was promoted to brigadier general. In October 1972, he became the commanding officer of 29 Palms, California. He assumed command of the 1st Marine Division in Camp Pendleton, California on May 1, 1973, and was promoted to major general the next day. Houghton relinquished command of the 1st Marine Division on August 12, 1974, subsequently assuming command of the 3rd Marine Division in Okinawa, Japan on August 23.

On August 13, 1975, Houghton was relieved by Major General Herbert L. Wilkerson. Houghton assumed the role of Commanding General of Marine Corps Recruit Depot San Diego, California. He served in this position until November 1, 1977, when he retired after 35 years of service.

Houghton continued working with defense contractors until retiring again in 1999. He was also active in the Marine Corps Oral History Program and received a Certificate of Appreciation from the Commandant of the Marine Corps, Paul X. Kelley in June 1986.

Kenneth J. Houghton died on March 27, 2006, in his home in La Jolla, California. He was buried in Fort Rosecrans National Cemetery.

== See also ==
- List of 1st Marine Division commanders
- List of 3rd Marine Division commanders
- List of Navy Cross recipients for the Vietnam War

Military offices
Preceded by Fred E. Haynes Jr.	Commanding General of the 3rd Marine Division; August 23, 1974 – August 13, 1975	Succeeded by Herbert L. Wilkerson
Preceded by Adolph G. Schwenk	Commanding General of the 1st Marine Division; May 1, 1973 – August 12, 1974	Succeeded by William L. McCulloch
Preceded by Fred E. Haynes Jr.	Commanding Officer of the 5th Marine Regiment; February 28, 1967 – July 1, 1967	Succeeded by Stanley Davis
