= 3rd Battalion, 5th Marines =

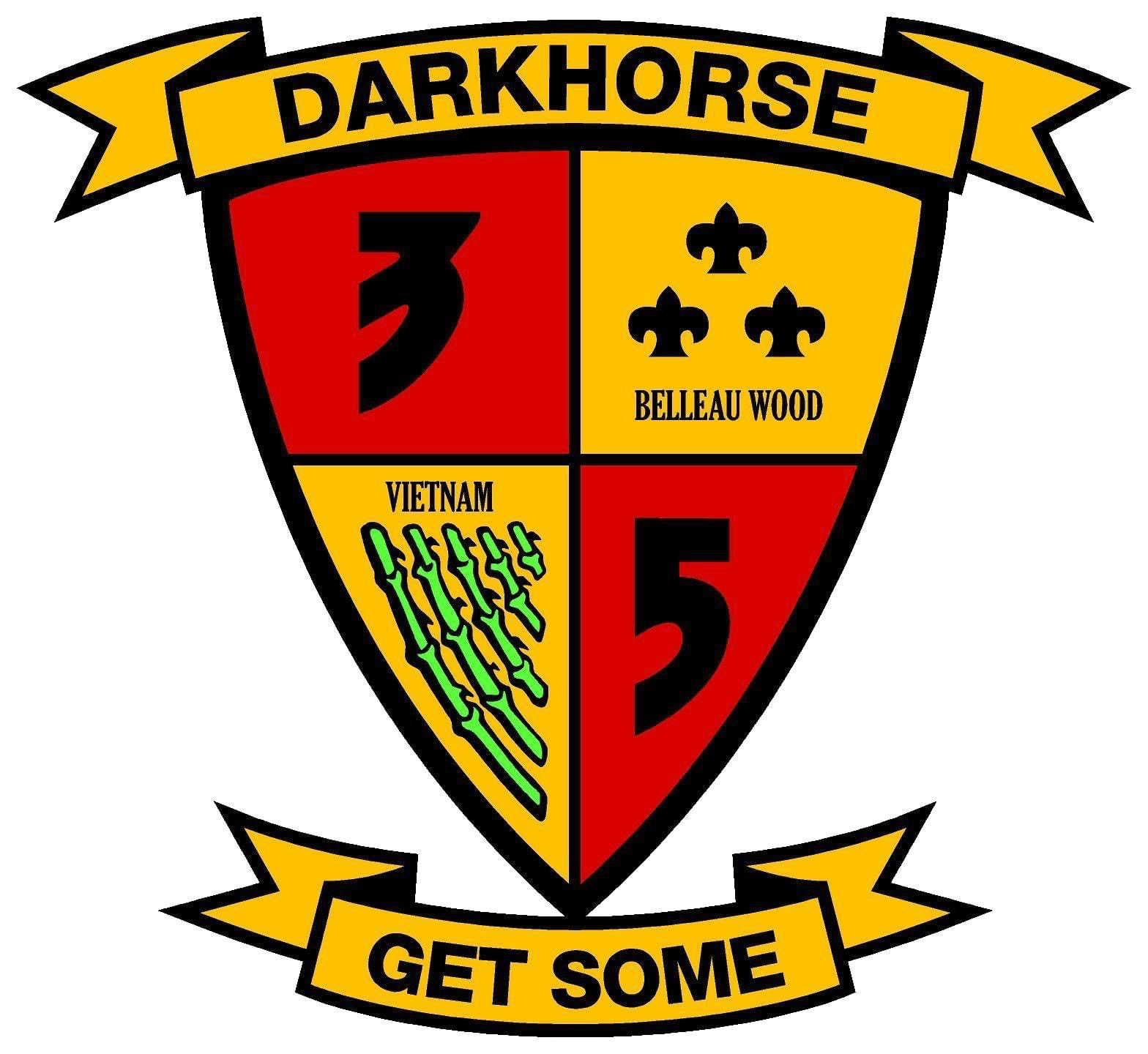
- Insignia for 3rd Battalion, 5th Marines
- Active: June 8, 1917 – August 13, 1919; May 17, 1921 – January 1933; November 1934 – March 1935; April 1, 1940 – April 15, 1946; October 15, 1949 – present
- Country: United States
- Branch: United States Marine Corps
- Type: Marines
- Role: Locate, close with and destroy the enemy by fire and maneuver, or repel enemy assault by fire and close combat
- Size: Battalion (~1,350 men)
- Part of: 5th Marine Regiment; 1st Marine Division
- Garrison/HQ: Marine Corps Base Camp Pendleton
- Nicknames: "Darkhorse" "Consummate Professionals"
- Motto: "Get Some"
- Engagements: World War I: Battle of Belleau Wood; Battle of Soissons; Battle of Saint-Mihiel; Battle of Blanc Mont Ridge; Meuse-Argonne offensive; Banana Wars: Occupation of Nicaragua; World War II: Guadalcanal Campaign; Battle of Cape Gloucester; Battle of Peleliu; Battle of Okinawa; Korean War: Battle of Pusan Perimeter; Battle of Inchon; Battle of Chosin Reservoir; Battle of Hwacheon; Battle of the Punchbowl; Battle of Bunker Hill (1952); First Battle of the Hook; Battle for Outpost Vegas; Battle of the Samichon River; Vietnam War: Operation Hastings; Operation Union I & II; Operation Swift; Battle of Hue; Operation Desert Storm; Operation Sea Angel; War on terror: Operation Iraqi Freedom; Operation Enduring Freedom

Commanders
- Current commander: LtCol Kevin C. Nicholson
- Notable commanders: John C. Miller Jr. Robert Taplett

3rd Battalion, 5th Marines (3/5, nicknamed Dark Horse) is an infantry marines battalion in the United States Marine Corps (USMC). The battalion is based at Marine Corps Base Camp Pendleton, California and consists of approximately 1,000 Marines and Fleet Marine Force Navy personnel.

The 3rd Battalion falls under the command of the 5th Marine Regiment which falls under the command of the 1st Marine Division.

== Subordinate units ==
- Headquarters and Service Company
- Company I (India Company)
- Company K (Kilo Company)
- Company L (Lima Company)
- Company M (Mike Company)
- Weapons Company

== History ==
=== World War I ===
3rd Battalion, 5th Marines, along with the rest of the 5th Marine Regiment, was first organized on June 8, 1917, as the United States prepared for World War I. The battalion was composed of four companies: the 16th, 20th, 45th and 47th. Six days later, manned by Spanish–American War and Boxer Rebellion veterans along with a large number of raw recruits, they set sail for France. They participated in campaigns and battles such as Bois de Belleau, Vierzy, Château-Thierry, Pont-a-Mousson, Limey Sector, Fleury, Meuse-Argonne, Blanc Mont, St Michiel, Leffincourt and Soissons. The French Government recognized the young battalion by presenting it the Croix de Guerre along with the Fourragère and changing the name of a French landmark, Belleau Wood, to "Bois de la Brigade de Marine" or "Wood of the Marine Brigade".

=== Interwar period ===
In August 1919, the battalion was deactivated following World War I and less than two years later, in May 1921, the 3rd Battalion, 5th Marines was reactivated. For the next several years, men of the 3rd Battalion served in the Caribbean and at home, guarding the U.S. Mail.

In March 1927, the 3rd Battalion deployed to Nicaragua to help stabilize the government against overthrow attempts by rebel forces. For the next six years, the battalion aided the Nicaraguan government until peace was finally restored. The job done, the 3rd Battalion was once again disbanded in January 1933. In November 1934, the 3rd Battalion was reactivated for the fourth time, only to be deactivated in March 1935.

=== World War II ===
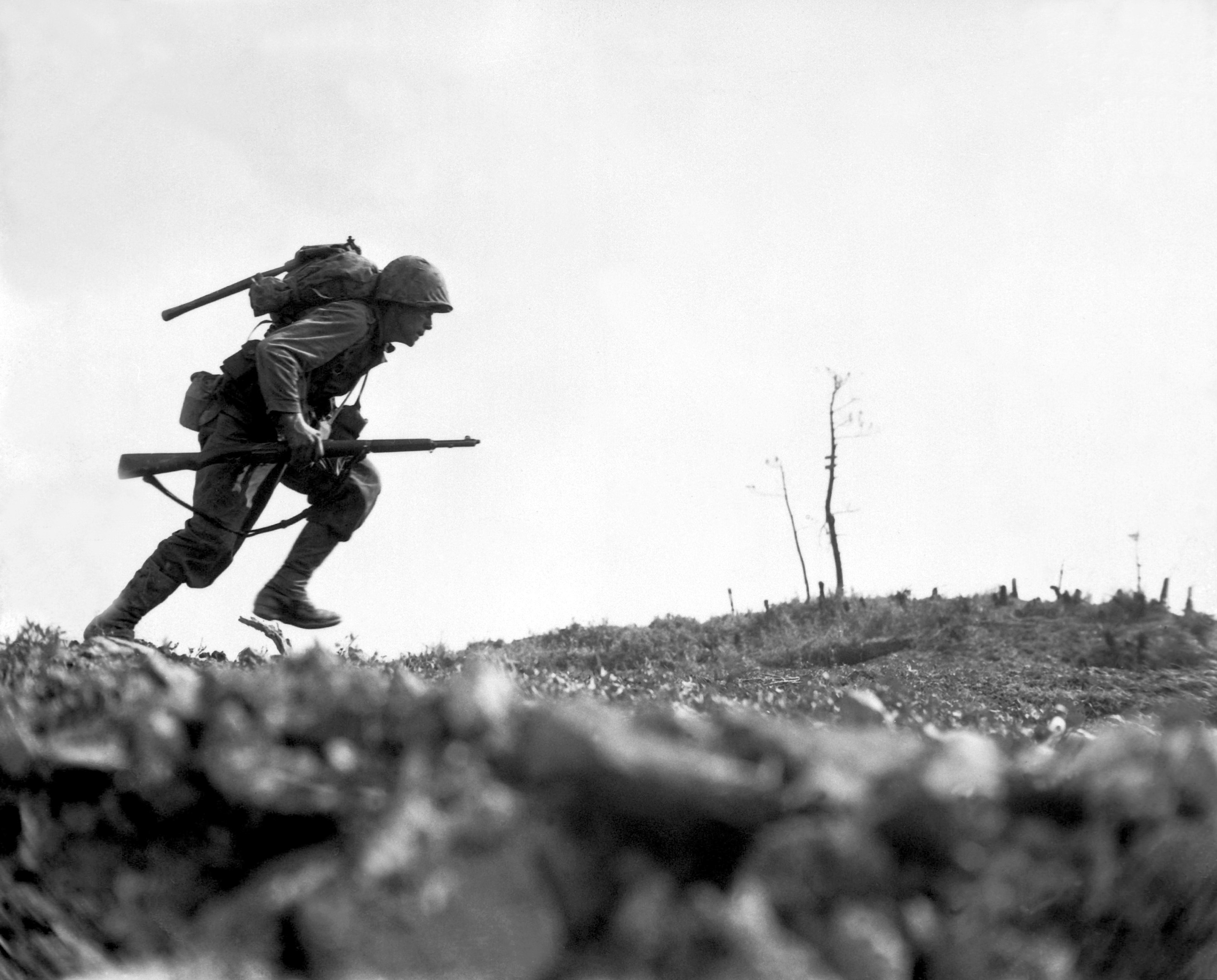
PFC Paul E. Ison, L/3/5, sprints across "Death Valley" while under heavy fire during the battle of Okinawa.

Shortly before World War II in April 1940, 3rd Battalion was again reactivated. The fighting in World War II found the Marines of 3/5 at Guadalcanal, New Britain, Peleliu, and Okinawa. At Peleliu, they were the last Marine battalion to be shipped out before the army took over. In April 1946, their mission accomplished, 3rd Battalion was disbanded and most of the Pacific veterans returned to civilian life.

=== Korean War ===
During October 1949, 3rd Battalion, 5th Marines, was reactivated on Guam. In August 1950 the battalion deployed to fight against the North Korean army's invasion of the Republic of Korea (South Korea) during the Korean War. The 3rd Battalion fought at the Pusan Perimeter, Inchon, Seoul and Chosin Reservoir. It inflicted heavy casualties on Chinese forces at the Battle of Hwacheon. At the close of hostilities, the 3rd Battalion returned to the United States, settling at MCB Camp Pendleton. The battalion's nickname "Darkhorse" sprang from the radio call sign of its commander in Korea, Colonel Robert Taplett, who was known as "Darkhorse Six".

=== Vietnam War ===
From April 1966 to March 1971, the 3rd Battalion, 5th Marines, deployed to South Vietnam during the Vietnam War. They fought in Chu Lai, Da Nang, Quang Nam, Operation Hastings, Operation Union, and Union II in the Que Son valley (where they received a Presidential Unit Citation), the Battle of Hue, An Hoa, Operation Swift in the Que Son Valley (where they received a second Presidential Unit Citation), and Firebase Ross. During the Vietnam War, the unit motto was "consummate professionals".

=== Gulf War and the 1990s ===
In October 1989 the battalion deployed to Panama. They patrolled the jungles and performed reconnaissance for the Army's invasion during Operation Just Cause. On December 1, 1990, the battalion deployed to the Middle East in support of Operation Desert Shield as a Battalion Landing Team with the 5th Marine Expeditionary Brigade. As part of the largest amphibious task force assembled since Vietnam, the battalion was augmented with mobilized Marine Corps Reserve units from 4th Assault Amphibian Battalion; TOW Platoon, 23rd Marines; Company A, 4th Light Armored Infantry Battalion, 25th Marines, 4th Marine Division; and 4th Tank Battalion. 3/5 distinguished itself in combat operations in Al Wafrah, Kuwait, during Operation Desert Storm as a Mechanized Combined Arms Task Force. En route home from hostilities, 3/5 participated in Operation Sea Angel, delivering critical food, supplies, and humanitarian assistance to the cyclone-ravaged country of Bangladesh.

=== Iraq War ===
Marines from 3rd Battalion, 1st Marines and 3rd Battalion, 5th Marines during the Second Battle of Fallujah.

3rd Battalion was deployed for the 2003 invasion of Iraq. The battalion was again deployed in 2004 to capture the city of Fallujah from insurgents' control. In November 2004, the battalion, along with several other units, participated in Operation Phantom Fury (also known as Al Fajr (Dawn)) and was part of one of the biggest battles in Iraq to that time.

On June 20, 2006, seven Marines and a Navy Corpsman of Kilo Company were charged with the April 26, 2006, murder of disabled Iraqi civilian Hashim Ibrahim Awad, an event referred to as the "Hamdania incident". All eight faced additional charges of kidnapping, conspiracy, larceny, assault and housebreaking or unlawfully entering a dwelling. Five of the men were accused of making a false official statement.

On May 19, 2006, Darkhorse Marines captured three insurgents responsible for the kidnapping and detention of Jill Carroll, an American journalist with The Christian Science Monitor.

In June 2006, Lance Corporal Reginal Dutt avenged the death of four 2/4 Marines Scout Snipers who had been killed on a rooftop in Ramadi in 2004. 3/5's mission in Habbaniyah killed the insurgent sniper and driver of a vehicle. The sniper rifle was demilitarized and now resides at the 5th Marines Regimental Command Post.

=== Afghanistan ===
Members of 3rd Battalion, 5th Marines, conducted operations in the Sangin District of Helmand Province, Afghanistan in support of Operation Enduring Freedom between September 2010 and April 2011. The area was handed over by 3rd Battalion, 7th Marines to 3rd Battalion, 5th Marines. Twenty-five of the battalion's Marines were killed in action and 200 were wounded, many losing limbs.

The 3rd Battalion are using Alternative Energy sources. A couple of forward combat bases use only solar power. One of the Marine foot patrols uses roll-up solar blankets to generate power for their radios and GPS.

3/5 was deployed as the Battalion Landing Team (BLT) for the 15th MEU. The 15th MEU is deployed with the Peleliu Amphibious Ready Group as a theater reserve and crisis response force throughout the U.S. Central Command and the U.S. 5th Fleet area of responsibility.

In 2013, a Marine veteran Logan Stark of 3/5 released a documentary following the STA (Surveillance and Target Acquisition) platoon of the battalion. Featuring interviews and combat footage from the engagements in Sangin, the documentary named For the 25 memorializes the 25 lost Marines during the battalion's seven-month deployment. Detailing the experiences of the Marines within the platoon, For the 25 recounts the adverse conditions and immense casualties sustained by the battalion and the personal struggles overcome by surviving members of the Scout Sniper platoon.

== "Darkhorse" nickname ==
The 3rd Battalion's nickname "Darkhorse" originated with the radio call sign it used during the Korean War, chosen by Colonel Robert Taplett, who as the Battalion Commander (CO) had the call sign "Darkhorse Six". The name fell out of use until 2003; during the training to return to Iraq in 2004, the Battalion Commander, Lt. Col. P. J. Malay, requested use of the "Darkhorse" call sign as a homage to the battalion's bravery in Korea. The nickname stuck and the 3/5 Marines now use it on their unofficial patches.

During the 1980s, the name for the 3rd Battalion was "Mangudai", named by then Battalion Commander, Lt. Col. Jack Kelly, who later went on to be promoted to Brigadier General, Commanding Officer of MCRD, San Diego. "Mangudai" was the name used by the special forces of Genghis Khan.

== Notable former members ==
- Sergeant R.V. Burgin – author of Islands of the Damned; Bronze Star for Combat in Battle of Okinawa; recipient of the Purple Heart.
- Major Brian Chontosh - recipient of the Navy Cross during Operation Iraqi Freedom
- Corporal Jack A. Davenport – posthumous recipient of the Medal of Honor during the Korean War.
- PFC Fernando Luis García – posthumous recipient of the Medal of Honor during the Korean War.
- Captain Andrew Haldane – Commanding officer of K company for the Battle of Cape Gloucester and most of the Battle of Peleliu during World War II. Recipient of the Silver Star for leading hand-to-hand combat in an attempt to capture an airfield on Cape Gloucester. A highly revered Marine Officer, Corporal Eugene Sledge's book With the Old Breed is dedicated to him.
- Staff Sergeant Elmo M. Haney – served in Company K in the Battle of Guadalcanal, Cape Gloucester and Peleliu.
- PFC Paul E. Ison – served in Company L and was the Marine seen in the iconic "Death Valley Photograph" taken on May 10, 1945 during the Battle of Okinawa.
- PFC Alford L. McLaughlin – recipient of the Medal of Honor during the Korean War.
- PFC Eugene A. Obregon – posthumous recipient of the Medal of Honor during the Korean War.
- Staff Sergeant Raymond Plouhar – featured in the film Fahrenheit 9/11.
- Laurence Stallings - served in 3rd Platoon, 47th Company during World War I and was wounded during the Battle of Belleau Wood.
- Then-Captain (later Brigadier General) Austin Shofner – former POW who escaped Japanese captivity.
- Lieutenant General Merwin H. Silverthorn – recipient of the following while in this unit in 1918: Navy Cross, Distinguished Service Cross, Silver Star Medal with oak-leaf cluster, French Croix de Guerre with Silver Star – with diploma, French Fourragere for combat in Aisne-Marne Offensive (Belleau Wood and Chateau Thierry), Aisne-Marne Offensive (Soissons), Marback Sector (Pont-a-Mousson), Meuse-Argonne Offensive (Champagne). Former Assistant Commandant of the Marine Corps.
- Corporal Eugene Sledge – author of With the Old Breed.
- Colonel Robert Taplett – commander of the battalion, recipient of the Navy Cross for combat in the Chosin Reservoir during the Korean War.
- Staff Sergeant William G. Windrich – posthumous recipient of the Medal of Honor during the Korean War.
- Jeremiah Workman – recipient of the Navy Cross for his valor during the Battle of Fallujah, author of the memoir Shadow of the Sword.
- Fred Smith - Founder of FedEx, Corp., Yale Graduate, and Captain in K Company, 3rd Battalion, 5th Marines. Served two tours in Vietnam where he was decorated for bravery and wounds received in combat.
