= Paul E. Ison =

United States Marine (1916–2001)

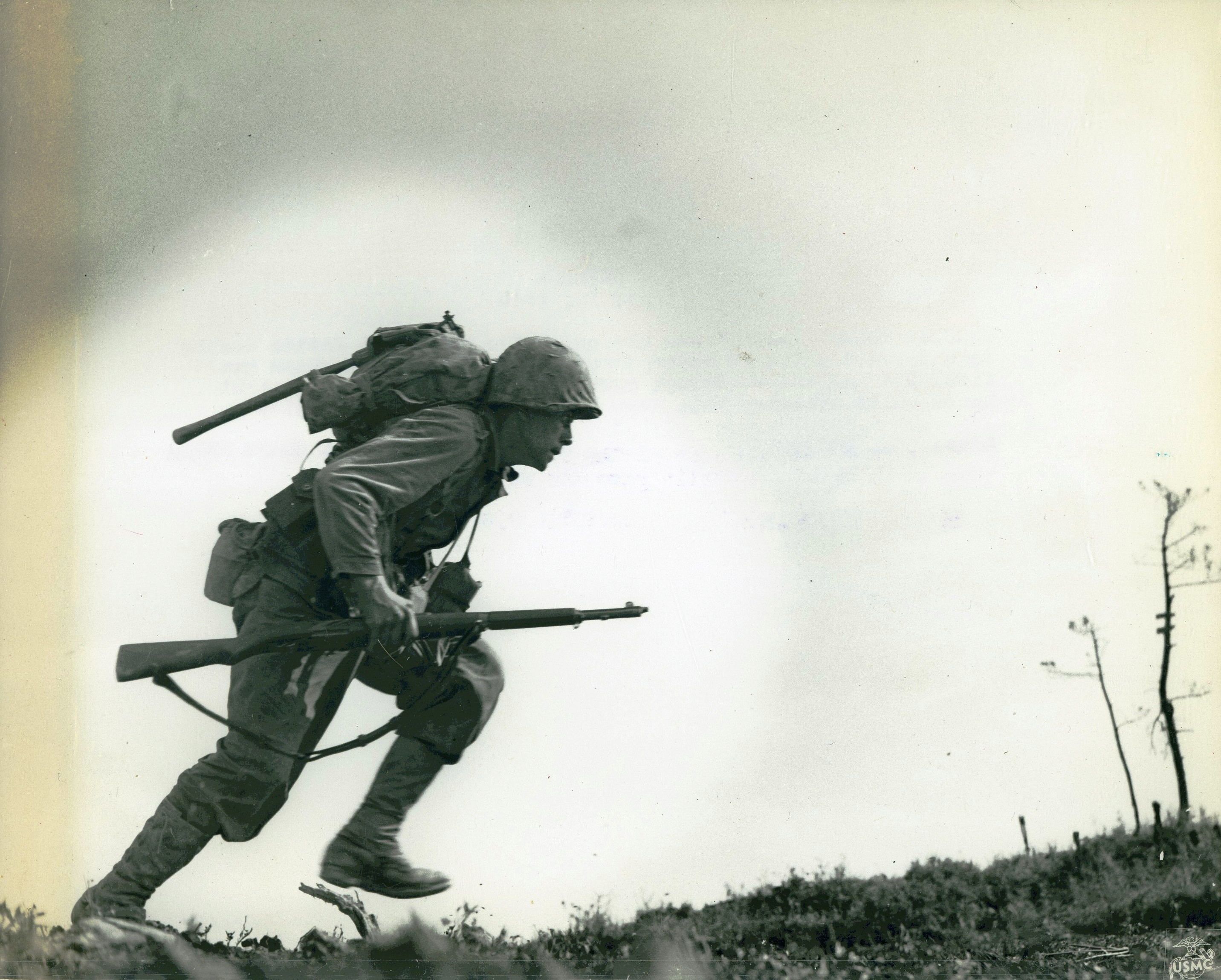
- Official USMC photograph, 10 May 1945
- Born: October 8, 1916; Ashland, Kentucky
- Died: October 3, 2001 (aged 84); Leesburg, Florida
- Military career
- Allegiance: United States of America
- Branch: United States Marine Corps
- Service years: 1944-1945
- Rank: Private First Class
- Units: Company L, 3rd Battalion, 5th Marines, 1st Marine Division
- Conflicts: World War II: Battle of Okinawa
- Awards: Bronze Star

Paul Edward Ison (October 8, 1916 – October 3, 2001) was a United States Marine Corps infantryman featured in an iconic World War II photograph shot by photographer Private Bob Bailey during the Battle of Okinawa on May 10, 1945, in which the crouching Ison is seen running across "Death Valley" while dodging heavy machine gun fire.

== Biography ==
An Ashland, Kentucky native born on October 8, 1916, Paul E. Ison was initially denied enlistment into the U.S. military, as he was a married father of four children. He assisted the war effort making shell casings at a factory in Cincinnati, Ohio. As the war raged on, restrictions gradually eased allowing him to enlist as a private in the Marine Corps at the age of 28. Because he was older, other Marines gave him the nickname "Pop".

He completed recruit training at Marine Corps Base San Diego and was assigned to the Fifth Marine Regiment, First Marine Division bound for the war already being waged in the Pacific. By the spring of 1945, he was trained as a demolitionist/flamethrower aboard the USS McCracken heading for Okinawa, a small island located south of Japan in the Ryukyu Chain.

In 1945, Okinawa grew in strategic importance for both sides. Situated less than 350 miles from mainland Japan, The Japanese had military airfields on the island and saw Okinawa as their last stronghold outside of Imperial Japan; the United States saw Okinawa as the final stepping stone in their island hopping campaign and final mustering point prior to an all out invasion of mainland Japan. It was the culminating point of the war in the Pacific and home to some of the fiercest fighting.

On the morning of May 10, eleven days after the 1st Marine Division entered the fray, Ison was part of a four-man team with L Company, 3rd Battalion, 5th Marines ordered to first go to the rear to pick up 96 pounds of dynamite, then take his team up to the line to set charges that would knock out defensive pillboxes and positions. En route to the objective area, he and his team would have to cross a draw located between two hills commanded by the Japanese known as "Death Valley".

Upon arrival at the ammunition dump, the team was informed that the required explosives had already been prepositioned at the forward line. This meant they would not be further burdened with the additional weight of munitions for their harrowing traverse across the war torn valley. The team crossed successfully, one at a time, dodging heavy fire and incoming rounds to join the assault platoon on the other side. This was when a young photographer captured the photo of a single Marine Corps rifleman, who was Paul E. Ison, moving forward under fire with resolute determination. Upon arrival, his team learned that the explosives had not, in fact, been sent ahead. They quickly realized they would need to cross two more times in order to first return for the charges and then carry the satchels filled with TNT back across Death Valley. Miraculously, they all survived the deadly gauntlet three times and went on to successfully complete their mission. The Marines attacked and took the hill in eight grueling hours. He was the recipient of the Bronze Star Medal with Combat "V".

After the war, Paul E. Ison first bought a pickup truck and started a hauling business. He later bought a tractor trailer and did cross country transport for the next twenty-nine years until January 1981. He retired to Fort Myers, Florida where he remained active in the Marine Corps League, Marine Corps Historical Foundation, Marine Corps Association and First Marine Division Association until his death on October 3, 2001. The Marine Corps League - Detachment #60 of Lee County, Florida has since been designated the PFC Paul E. Ison Detachment.

The Marine Corps later adopted this photo as a symbol of the Marine infantryman's willingness to advance under fire. It has been referred to as Combat Picture #120562 and has been widely used in the press to illustrate the fortitude and tenacity of the front-line Marine. Ison's name is sometimes misspelled on the caption of the official photograph as "Paul Isen."

He died on October 3, 2001, and was buried at Fort Myers Memorial Gardens, Fort Myers, Florida.

== Additional reading ==
- Media related to Paul E. Ison at Wikimedia Commons
- David P. Colley (6 October 2015). Seeing the War: The Stories Behind the Famous Photographs from World War II. University Press of New England. ISBN 9781611687262 – via Google Books.
- LIFE Heroes of World War II: Men and Women Who Put Their Lives on the Line. LIFE. June 23, 2017. ISBN 978-1683302100.
- Manchester, William (2002-04-12). Goodbye, Darkness: A Memoir of the Pacific War. Little, Brown. ISBN 0316501115 – via Google Books.
- "Ashland Native Paul E. Ison and his famous "Death Valley Photo" from Okinawa in WWII". Eastern Kentucky Military Historical Society. 11 July 2013.
