= Jack A. Davenport =

American boxer and United States Marine Corps Medal of Honor recipient

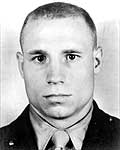
- Born: September 7, 1931; Kansas City, Missouri
- Died: September 21, 1951 (aged 20) near Songnae-dong, Korea
- Burial place: Mount Moriah Cemetery, Hickman Mills, Missouri
- Military career
- Allegiance: United States
- Branch: United States Marine Corps
- Service years: 1950–1951
- Rank: Corporal
- Units: Company G, 3rd Battalion, 5th Marines, 1st Marine Division
- Conflicts: Korean War †
- Awards: Medal of Honor; Purple Heart
- Other work: Golden Gloves boxer

Jack Arden Davenport (September 7, 1931 – September 21, 1951) was a former Golden Gloves boxer and a United States Marine who posthumously received the Medal of Honor for his heroic actions and sacrifice of life during the Korean War. Davenport served as Squad Leader in Company G, Third Battalion, Fifth Marines, First Marine Division (Reinforced).

== Biography ==
Jack Davenport was born September 7, 1931, in Kansas City, Missouri, where he graduated from high school in 1949. While in high school, he was a newspaper carrier for the Kansas City Star and played American Legion baseball for three seasons. Upon completing high school, he studied for a year at the University of Kansas, where he was a member of the freshman football team.

He enlisted in the Marine Corps on July 25, 1950, and completed his recruit training at Marine Corps Recruit Depot San Diego, California, that September. He was then stationed with the Training and Replacement Command at Camp Pendleton, California, until December 1950, when he embarked to join the 5th Marines in Korea.

In the early morning of September 21, 1951, Corporal Davenport sacrificed his life to save the life of a fellow Marine Priv. Robert W Smith in Korea. He was standing watch together with Priv. Smith when an enemy hand grenade landed in their foxhole. Davenport found the grenade in the dark and smothered its explosion with his own body in order to save the life of his fellow Marine.

His body was returned to the United States in January 1952 to be buried at Mount Moriah Cemetery, Hickman Mills, Missouri. Davenport's father, Fred Davenport received the Medal of Honor on January 7, 1953, from U.S. Secretary of the Navy Dan A. Kimball in Washington, D.C.

== Medal of Honor citation ==
Davenport was awarded his Medal of Honor for his actions in battle while stationed against North Korean forces in Seongnae-Dong. Early on the morning of 21 September 1951, while directing the defense of his position during a probing attack by North Korean Forces attempting to infiltrate the area, Davenport threw himself over an enemy hand grenade that landed in his foxhole. By doing so, he saved the life of Private Robert Smith, who also occupied the foxhole.

== Awards and decorations ==

1st row	Medal of Honor		
2nd Row	Purple Heart	Combat Action Ribbon Retroactively Awarded, 1999	Navy Presidential Unit Citation
3rd Row	Marine Corps Good Conduct Medal	National Defense Service Medal	Korean Service Medal with 4 Campaign stars
4th Row	Republic of Korea Presidential Unit Citation	United Nations Korea Medal	Korean War Service Medal Retroactively Awarded, 2003

== See also ==
- List of Medal of Honor recipients
- List of Korean War Medal of Honor recipients
