= Hamdania incident =

2006 murder of Iraqi by US Marine

Coordinates: 33°20′6″N 44°3′34″E

The Hamdania incident refers to the kidnapping and subsequent murder of an Iraqi man by United States Marines on April 26, 2006, in Al Hamdania, a small village west of Baghdad near Abu Ghraib. An investigation by the Naval Criminal Investigative Service resulted in charges of murder, kidnapping, housebreaking, larceny, Obstruction of Justice and conspiracy associated with the alleged coverup of the incident. They were forced to drop many charges on the defendants. The defendants are seven Marines and a Navy Corpsman. As of February 2007, five of the defendants have negotiated pleas to lesser charges of kidnapping and conspiracy, or less, and have agreed to testify in these trials. Additional Marines from the same battalion faced lesser charges of assault related to the use of physical force during interrogations of suspected insurgents. Those charges were dropped.

== Victim ==
Hashim Ibrahim Awad (1952 – April 26, 2006) was a disabled Iraqi veteran. He was known as Hashim the Lame because of the metal bar that was surgically implanted in his leg. He had been injured in the war with Iran in the 1980s. He also suffered from limited eyesight.

== Unlawful shooting ==
The Iraqi body is still unidentified, but the defense attorneys of the Marines on trial challenged this, stipulating that the victim was actually Hashim Gowad, a suspected insurgent and the cousin of the Marines' intended target, Saleh Gowad. The charges against the Marines were thereafter revised to identify the shooting victim only as "an unknown Iraqi." According to testimony received under various plea agreements, it was alleged that the Marines abducted an Iraqi man, killed him a half-hour later, placed an AK-47 and a shovel next to his body along the road, then falsified the formal report of the incident, asserting he was shot while digging a hole for a roadside bomb. In an interview on ABC television, Congressman John P. Murtha explained "some Marines pulled somebody out of a house, put them next to an IED, fired some AK-47 rounds so they'd have cartridges there. And then tried to cover that up."

According to neighbors at around 2:00 AM on the morning of April 26, Marines allegedly pounded on the door of one of the village houses demanding a search. They asked the occupant, an alleged cousin of the victim, if he had any weapons. He had an AK-47 (each family in Iraq is allowed one rifle). They took the rifle and also a shovel resting in front of the house, so he says. At the Iraqi's house in question, the Marines broke into the home while the victim was sleeping and took him from the house, not searching his house afterward. The Marines then bound the man's hands using plastic restraints and forced him to walk a distance back to the ambush site. Once they arrived at the ambush site, the Marines bound (the autopsy was inconclusive and could not verify this) the man's feet and placed him into a hole from an old IED blast. The Marines then ran back to the area where the other members of their squad were standing and fired upon the man in the IED hole. While some Marines were shooting him with their rifles, other members of the squad were shooting the stolen AK-47 rifle into the air to make it sound like a firefight was occurring. After the Iraqi man was dead, the Marines scattered the expended AK-47 brass next to the body, removed the plastic restraints, and placed the AK-47 rifle next to the body.

The next morning the local police brought a body to the neighbors for identification, saying he had been killed by the Americans. Family members recognized the man and the body was sent by the Iraqi police to the local hospital. The victim's face was swollen beyond recognition and he had been shot in the mouth. By other accounts he was shot four times in the face. The official autopsy results have not — as of the time of the Article 32 hearings for Jodka, Shumate, and Magincalda — been made public.

== Charges and investigation ==
=== Murder and kidnapping charges ===
The Marines involved, members of Kilo Company, 3rd Battalion, 5th Marines ("3/5"), 1st Marine Division, were placed in confinement at Camp Pendleton pending possible charges. Press reports noted it was unusual for Marines to be placed in the brig before charges were filed, suggesting concern by authorities the men were considered a flight risk. Under military law the defendants could face the death penalty. These Marines were brought back from Iraq with no restraint and had stops along the way back to Camp Pendleton. They were free to roam at Camp Pendleton upon arrival and until the next day and none of them made any attempt to flee. They were only, then, put in shackles and chains and taken to the brig.

On June 21, 2006, the Reuters news services reported that the United States Marine Corps announced charges of murder against seven Marines and one Navy Hospital Corpsman: Corporal Marshall L. Magincalda, Corporal Trent D. Thomas, Lance Corporal Robert B. Pennington, Navy Hospital Corpsman 3rd Class Melson J. Bacos, Lance Corporal Jerry E. Shumate Jr., Private First Class John J. Jodka, and Lance Corporal Tyler A. Jackson, Lance Corporal Jason Finley. The charges also included kidnapping, conspiracy, making false official statements, and larceny.

=== Further investigations ===
Shortly after the incident came to light, the House and Senate armed services committees intended to hold hearings into the Hamdania events as well as the Haditha massacre. However, as of 2007 no hearings have been announced.

In the course of the military investigation, additional assault charges were made against Hutchins, Shumate, and Thomas, as well as against three other Marines from the same battalion who were not involved in the alleged murder, all of which were dropped later. Staff Sergeant Sabio A. Lozano and lance Corporal Jason Finley were not charged with any crimes. A seventh Marine, an infantry officer, is also expected to face assault charges. An attorney familiar with the military investigation expects the charges will relate to the use of physical violence to extract information from suspected insurgents in the Hamdania area.

Subsequent reports reveal that these assault charges, which were all dropped, were related to activities occurring half a month earlier on April 10, 2006, also in Hamdania, in which three civilians were brutalized by US Marine personnel. It was disclosed that the Marine officer was 2nd Lt. Nathan P. Phan, who later admitted he beat the civilians to the point of nearly killing them, choked two of them, and placed a loaded M9 service pistol into the mouth of the third civilian. Phan is also charged with making a false official statement. Phan's attorney states that all charges are without merit.

=== Initial hearings ===
On August 30, 2006, separate military hearings were initiated for Magincalda and Jodka under Article 32 of the Uniform Code of Military Justice on several charges each, including murder. Reports returned recommended a General Court Martial (the IO report for Magincalda is not specific recommendations of specific charges for Court Martial).

Other members of the squad charged in the Hamdania incident were expected to have their Article 32 hearings in September and October 2006.

Article 32 hearings are analogous to grand jury investigations in that they function to determine if there is sufficient evidence to support a trial. In place of a jury, the decision will be made by the ranking officer at Camp Pendleton, Lt. General James Mattis, based on a recommendation from an Investigating Officer.

According to Gary D. Solis, professor at Georgetown University Law Center and former Marine Corps prosecutor, it is likely that prosecutors will be able to get at least one of the eight squad members to cooperate with the promise of a reduced sentence, as some of them potentially face the death penalty. On October 4, 2006, Bacos revealed through his lawyer Jeremiah Sullivan that he will testify against the Marine defendants. The details of that plea deal and his proffered testimony were not released at the time. Defense attorneys are expected to object that testimony allegedly obtained under coercion as unreliable, and also to argue that Iraqi accounts of the incident are also suspect.

In spite of defense statements that their clients' Article 32 hearings showed weaknesses in the prosecution's case, on September 25, 2006, Mattis recommended that Jodka, Shumate, and Magincalda face a general court martial for murder. According to Mattis' official statements, the defendants no longer face the death penalty.

=== Petty Officer Bacos' testimony ===
On October 7, 2006, military prosecutors reached an agreement with Petty Officer 3rd Class Melson J. Bacos in which charges against the corpsman would be reduced to kidnapping and conspiracy in return for his testimony.

According to Bacos, the Marines set out that night to capture an insurgent who had been captured and released several times. They agreed in advance if they could not get the insurgent, they would "get someone else". Knocking on the door of one house, they took the home owner's AK-47 rifle and a shovel from his yard. They proceeded to another house which turned out to be the home of the unidentified Iraqi man. They allegedly took this man from his home, allegedly bound his hands and feet, then placed him in a hole. The squad opened fire on this man as Hutchins put a call into the command center requesting permission to fire on an insurgent. At the same time, Bacos fired an AK-47 into the air to simulate the sound of a fire fight. After the squad fired upon this man from a distance, Hutchins fired three rounds into his head. Thomas fired seven to 10 more rounds into his chest to check he was dead. Pennington then pressed Awad's fingerprints onto a shovel and AK-47 they had brought to implicate him as an insurgent.

=== Shumate's conspiracy plea and sentence ===
In November 2006, Lance Corporal Jerry Shumate was jailed for 21 months after he pleaded guilty to the aggravated assault of an Iraqi man who was killed in the town of Hamdania in April. Shumate also admitted conspiracy to obstruct justice. In return for his guilty pleas, other charges including murder, kidnapping, assault and conspiracy were dismissed. During his testimony at Camp Pendleton in California, Shumate said that the squad had been looking for Iraqis planting IED's when the men agreed a plan to kill a known insurgent. Four of the squad from the 2nd platoon of Kilo Company from Camp Pendleton's 3rd Battalion, 5th Marine Regiment left to abduct him, Shumate said. When they returned with a prisoner, he thought he was "told to fire" by the squad leader and fired between 10 and 20 rounds at the detainee. The team leader gave no such order to be followed, and was on the other side of the village under fire with two other Marines.Eight men were originally charged with kidnapping the Iraqi man and trying to cover up his killing by planting a gun and a shovel next to the body to make him look like he was planting bombs. He was seized from his home after the suspected insurgent could not be found. Other US marines based at Camp Pendleton are under investigation over a separate incident in November 2005 in which 24 civilians were killed in the Iraqi town of Haditha. (North County Times and other online reports 22 November 2006) As of April, 2009 only 3 of the Haditha Marines still face any charges at all.

=== Pennington's plea deal and sentence ===
On February 18, 2007, the fifth Marine to be tried, Lance Cpl. Robert Pennington, received an eight-year jail sentence after agreeing to plead guilty to conspiracy and kidnapping charges. In return for his cooperative testimony against the remaining three defendants, prosecutors dropped additional charges of murder, larceny, and housebreaking. The initial sentence was reduced from 14 years to eight in return for his cooperation. Pennington served a few months of the sentence for his role in the murder and was granted clemency and released from prison on August 11, 2007.

=== Hutchins found guilty of murder ===
On August 2, 2007, Sgt. Lawrence G. Hutchins III was found guilty of (*unpremeditated murder) by a military court-martial jury. In addition, Hutchins was also found guilty of conspiracy to commit murder, making a false official statement and larceny. He was acquitted on charges of kidnapping, assault and housebreaking. He was sentenced to 15 years in military prison for his role in the case; this is the longest sentence given to any of the conspirators in this case and the only additional confinement given to any of the three Marines who went to trial in this case: Hutchins, Thomas, and Magincalda, as reported in the August 3rd issue of California's North County Times. Lt. Gen. Samuel Helland, commanding general of United States Marine Forces Central Command, turned down a request to issue Hutchins a pardon but did reduce the sentence to 11 years. Hutchins serves his sentence at the United States Disciplinary Barracks at Fort Leavenworth while pursuing an appeal.

=== Overturn and retrial ===
In 2010, Hutchins conviction was overturned in April 2010 due to an inappropriate dismissal of one of his attorneys before trial. In 2013, as he was not provided legal counsel when asked and was interrogated without counsel after having asked for it, the United States Court of Appeals for the Armed Forces overturned Hutchins' conviction. In 2015, following a statement made by Secretary of the Navy Ray Mabus, a new trial was ordered by Lieutenant General Robert Neller.

On June 17, 2015, Hutchins was convicted by a military jury for a second time, being found guilty of the murder of Hashim Ibrahim Awad and also conspiracy and larceny, while being acquitted on a charge of falsifying an official statement. A jury decided that Huchins should serve no additional time and he was released.

== Initial confusion over the village name 'Hamdania' ==
Some accounts, including the original U.S. government press release, incorrectly gave the name of the village as Hamandiyah or Hamadiya instead of the correct Hamdania (pronounced hahm-da-NEE-yah). A variant spelling is Hamdaniyah. A number of unrelated locations in the region share a similar name including Al-Hamdaniya Municipality near Mosul.

== See also ==
- United States war crimes
