= Robert Taplett =

Robert D. Taplett
- Born: December 10, 1918; Tyndall, South Dakota, U.S.
- Died: December 17, 2004 (aged 86); Falls Church, Virginia, U.S.
- Burial place: Arlington National Cemetery
- Military career
- Allegiance: United States of America
- Branch: United States Marine Corps
- Service years: 1940–1960
- Rank: Colonel
- Commands: 3rd Battalion, 5th Marines; MCRD Parris Island
- Conflicts: World War II; Attack on Pearl Harbor; Battle of the Coral Sea; Battle of the Aleutian Islands; Korean War; Battle of Pusan Perimeter; Battle of Inchon; Battle of Chosin Reservoir
- Awards: Navy Cross; Silver Star (2); Legion of Merit; Bronze Star

Robert Donald Taplett (December 10, 1918 – December 17, 2004) was a highly decorated United States Marine who was most notable for commanding 3rd Battalion, 5th Marines during the Battle of Chosin Reservoir during the Korean War for which he was awarded the Navy Cross — the second highest medal for valor in the United States Armed Forces.

Taplett served with distinction in the Marine Corps for 20 years. He served aboard ship in the Pacific Theater during World War II. During the Korean War, he served as commander of 3rd Battalion, 5th Marines. After retiring from the Marine Corps, he authored a book that chronicled his experiences during the Korean War.

== Biography ==
Taplett was born in Tyndall, South Dakota, on December 10, 1918. He attended the University of South Dakota where he joined the Phi Delta Theta fraternity. He graduated with honors in 1940. Although he was a member of the Army ROTC, he resigned his commission and joined the Marine Corps as a second lieutenant.

=== World War II ===
During the attack on Pearl Harbor, Taplett was aboard the USS Salt Lake City which was not damaged during the assault. The Salt Lake City was one of only a handful of ships able to pursue the Japanese fleet. Taplett served on the ship for three years and participated in numerous campaigns in the Pacific Theater, including the Battle of the Coral Sea and the Battle of the Aleutian Islands in 1943.

After the war, Taplett, now a colonel, was assigned as the commanding officer of the navy supply barracks first at Clearview, Utah, and subsequently at Treasure Island in San Francisco Bay and at the Naval Air Station Alameda, California.

=== Korean War ===
Taplett was dispatched to Korea immediately after the outbreak of hostilities. He was made commanding officer of the 3rd Battalion, 5th Marines, and participated in numerous battles. His unit held the perimeter at Pusan and led the Inchon landing, taking Wolmi-do Island(Battle of Inchon), which was the gateway to Inchon. He led the 3rd Battalion through the gates of Seoul to liberate the South Korean State House.

During the Battle of the Chosin Reservoir, Taplett distinguished himself. From November 27 to December 10, 1950, he supported the strategic fallback of American forces, who were outnumbered by the Chinese nearly 5 to 1. Despite the severe cold and harsh weather, he and his men fought desperately to clear the road which allowed for escape from the reservoir. Of the roughly 1,300 men in his unit who began the fight, only 326 able-bodied Marines were left. For his leadership during the battle, Taplett was awarded the Navy Cross.

=== After the war ===
After the Korean War, he became the academic director of The Basic School at Marine Corps Base Quantico in 1951 and 1952. From 1957 through 1959, he was based in Marine Corps Base Hawaii, although most of his time was spent training troops in Okinawa and the Philippines. Taplett was also a guest lecturer to various military units throughout the country speaking on the importance of close air support for ground troops.

He retired from the Marine Corps in 1960, citing his displeasure with not being able to work directly with his troops and his military pay, which was not enough to support six children.

=== In retirement ===
Afterward, Taplett and his family moved to Arlington, Virginia, where he spent the rest of his life. He earned a master's degree from George Washington University in 1974. He joined the United States Postal Service and fully retired in 1993. He went back to visit Korea twice and eventually wrote a book, Darkhorse Six (2003), which chronicled his experiences in Korea.

He and wife Patricia Kingston Taplett had six children – Claire Ross Taplett, Robert Howard Taplett, Christine Kingston Taplett, Marty Kingston Taplett, Martin Ross Taplett, and Margot Barbara Taplett – and nine grandchildren.

Colonel Robert Taplett died on December 17, 2004, of congestive heart failure and was buried in Arlington National Cemetery with full military honors.

== Awards ==
=== Navy Cross citation ===
Citation:

The President of the United States of America takes pleasure in presenting the Navy Cross to Lieutenant Colonel Robert Donald Taplett (MCSN: 0-6678), United States Marine Corps, for extraordinary heroism in connection with military operations against an armed enemy of the United Nations while serving as Commanding Officer of the Third Battalion, Fifth Marines, FIRST Marine Division (Reinforced), in action against enemy aggressor forces in the Republic of Korea from 28 November to 10 December 1950. When a vastly outnumbering hostile force attacked his Battalion assembly area northwest of Yudam-ni during the pre-dawn hours of 28 November, Lieutenant Colonel Taplett remained steadfast in the midst of heavy fire and bursting grenades as the enemy penetrated to within ten yards of the command post, maintaining communications with and directing the fire of two of his companies which were also under attack and directing the third reserve company in delivering a brilliantly executed counterattack to repel the onslaught in all sectors before daybreak. Assigned, on 1 December, to break the enemy's main line of resistance which controlled the principal supply route of entrapped Marine units near Yudam-ni, he placed himself in a forward position to observe and control operations and, although he was knocked to the ground by mortar fire on one occasion, and subjected to continuous small-arms and artillery fire throughout two days of intensive action, succeeded in driving the enemy from the area, thereby enabling the FIRST Marine Division to remove all troops, casualties, equipment and supplies in safety. With the Division train cut in half by hostile fire during the march from Hagaru-ri to Koto-ri on 7 December, and the rear elements unable to advance for a period of more than ten hours, Lieutenant Colonel Taplett moved two miles to the head of the convoy under heavy fire and, effecting a skillful reorganization, started the train moving, at the same time supervising his own Battalion in offensive neutralizing action against the strongpoint. Later the same day when the enemy struck the rear echelon in estimated battalion strength, he again left his position and braved the intense fire to analyze the situation. Promptly calling for air strikes, bringing his own supportive fire to bear and maneuvering two rifle companies into action, he conducted a devastating offensive to annihilate the attackers and enable the Marine units to reach their destination without further opposition. By his inspiring leadership, forceful combat tactics and gallant fighting spirit maintained against staggering odds, Lieutenant Colonel Taplett contributed to the success of his Battalion in accounting for more than 2,000 of the enemy with a total of only 117 in his own ranks. His fortitude and devotion to duty throughout the bitterly fought twelve-day battle reflect the highest credit upon himself and the United States Naval Service.

=== First Silver Star citation ===
Citation:

The President of the United States of America, authorized by Act of Congress July 9, 1918, takes pleasure in presenting the Silver Star (Army Award) to Lieutenant Colonel Robert Donald Taplett (MCSN: 0-6678), United States Marine Corps, for gallantry in action while Commanding Third Battalion, Fifth Marines, FIRST Marine Division (Rein.), United Nations Command. Lieutenant Colonel Taplett distinguished himself by conspicuous gallantry in action in the amphibious landing resulting in the capture of Wolmi-Do, Korea, on 15 September 1950 in the Inchon-Seoul operation. His actions contributed materially to the success of this operation and were in keeping with the highest traditions of the United States Military Services.

=== Second Silver Star citation ===
Citation:

The President of the United States of America takes pleasure in presenting a Gold Star in lieu of a Second Award of the Silver Star to Lieutenant Colonel Robert Donald Taplett (MCSN: 0-6678), United States Marine Corps, for conspicuous gallantry and intrepidity as Commanding Officer of the Third Battalion, Fifth Marines, FIRST Marine Division (Reinforced), in action against enemy aggressor forces in Korea, on 21 September 1950. Assigned the mission of seizing and occupying two hills overlooking the regimental objective, Lieutenant Colonel Taplett skillfully carried out this hazardous task and, upon its completion, coolly remained in an exposed area to personally direct the placing of supporting fire on strong enemy positions which were bringing intense small-arms, machine-gun, mortar and artillery fire to bear on the entire battalion front and causing many casualties. By his inspiring leadership, gallant fighting spirit and courageous devotion to duty in the face of heavy enemy fire, Lieutenant Colonel Taplett contributed materially to the success of the regiment in carrying out its assigned mission and upheld the highest traditions of the United States Naval Service.
