= Brian Chontosh =

US Marine Corps officer

Brian R. Chontosh
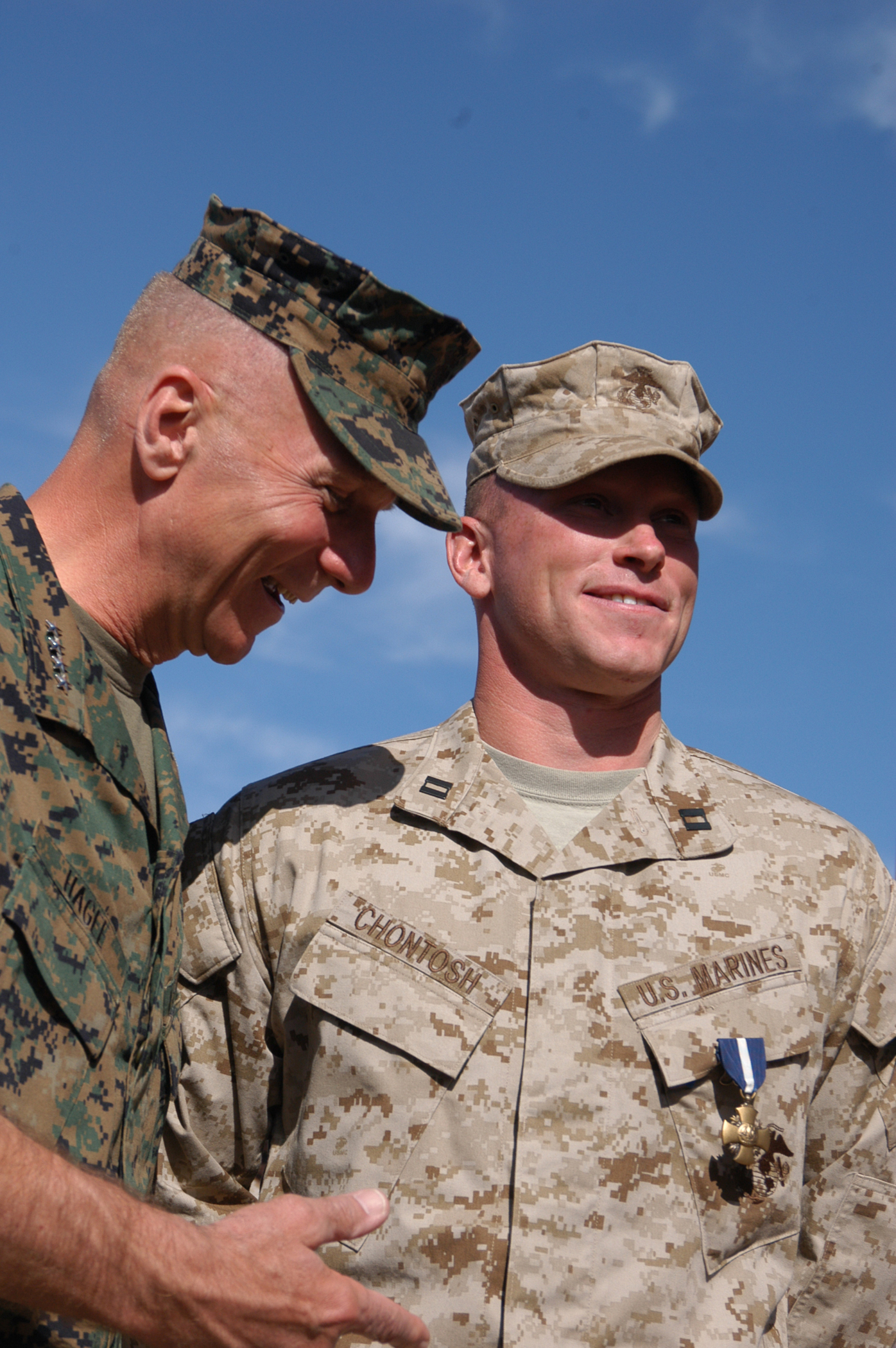
- Capt Brian Chontosh receives his Navy Cross from the Commandant of the Marine Corps Gen. Michael Hagee
- Born: 1974 (age 51–52); Rochester, New York, U.S.
- Military career
- Allegiance: United States of America
- Branch: United States Marine Corps
- Service years: February 1993 - October 2013
- Rank: Major
- Unit: 3rd Battalion, 5th Marines
- Conflicts: Operation Iraqi Freedom; *2003 invasion of Iraq; *Operation Phantom Fury
- Awards: Navy Cross; Bronze Star x 2 with "V"

Major Brian R. Chontosh (born 1974) is a retired United States Marine Corps officer who was awarded the Navy Cross for his actions during the 2003 Invasion of Iraq. At the time, he was a platoon commander for Weapons Company, 3rd Battalion, 5th Marines, 1st Marine Division.

== Military career ==
In 1993, Chontosh enlisted in the Marine Corps out of high school. After several deployments as an enlisted marine, he was selected for an officer commissioning program and received a commission upon completing a Bachelor of Science degree at Rochester Institute of Technology in 2000.

As a Lieutenant in the 3rd Battalion, 5th Marines, Chontosh participated in the initial invasion during the Iraq War. On March 25, 2003, during an ambush while advancing upon Baghdad, Chontosh aggressively attacked an entrenched enemy position, resorting to using captured enemy weaponry when his M16 ran out of ammunition. He is reported to have killed at least 20 enemy soldiers during the incident.

Chontosh returned to Iraq during the second half of 2004 as the company commander of India Company, 3rd Battalion, 5th Marines. During this time his company took part in Operation Phantom Fury, the second assault on Fallujah in November 2004. Of the 158 Marines he commanded, 3 were killed in action and 25 were wounded. During this time his company was also the focus of a Fox News documentary titled Breaking Point: Company of Heroes.

He also served as the 8th Company Officer at the United States Naval Academy and the Officer Rep for the Naval Academy Women's Ice Hockey Team (2011-2013)

There have been some news articles on the perceived lack of coverage that was awarded to this and other medal ceremonies. The controversy over the coverage or lack of coverage of Chontosh and several other servicemen is seen by the conservative political and some media as the latest cultural clash between pro-military and anti-war political camps.

== Navy Cross citation ==
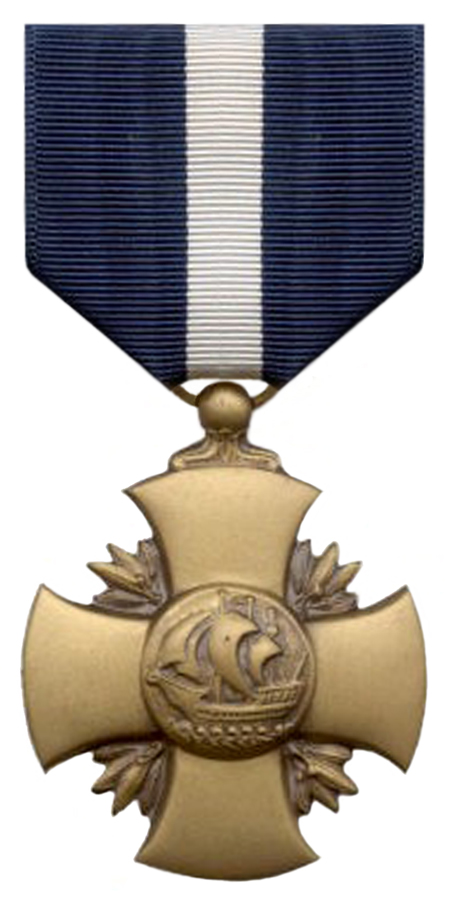
Navy Cross

The President of the United States
Takes Pleasure in Presenting
The Navy Cross
To

Brian R. Chontosh
First Lieutenant, United States Marine Corps

For Services as Set Forth in the Following Citation:

For extraordinary heroism as Combined Anti-Armor Platoon Commander, Weapons Company, 3rd Battalion, 5th Marines, 1st Marine Division, I Marine Expeditionary Force in support of Operation IRAQI FREEDOM on 25 March 2003. While leading his platoon north on Highway I toward Ad Diwaniyah, First Lieutenant Chontosh's platoon moved into a coordinated ambush of mortars, rocket propelled grenades, and automatic weapons fire. With coalition tanks blocking the road ahead, he realized his platoon was caught in a kill zone.

He had his driver move the vehicle through a breach along his flank, where he was immediately taken under fire from an entrenched machine gun. Without hesitation, First Lieutenant Chontosh ordered the driver to advance directly at the enemy position enabling his .50 caliber machine gunner to silence the enemy.

He then directed his driver into the enemy trench, where he exited his vehicle and began to clear the trench with an M16A2 service rifle and 9 millimeter pistol. His ammunition depleted, First Lieutenant Chontosh, with complete disregard for his safety, twice picked up discarded enemy rifles and continued his ferocious attack.

When a Marine following him found an enemy rocket propelled grenade launcher, First Lieutenant Chontosh used it to destroy yet another group of enemy soldiers. When his audacious attack ended, he had cleared over 200 meters of the enemy trench, killing more than 20 enemy soldiers and wounding several others.

== Honors ==
- Chontosh, a 2000 graduate of Rochester Institute of Technology (RIT) was honored as RIT's 2005 Outstanding Alumnus.
- Honorary graduate of the United States Naval Academy, Class of 2006.
- On September 21, 2006, at the annual Keeper of the Flame dinner, Captain Chontosh was honored by Chairman of the Joint Chiefs of Staff General Peter Pace for his actions in March 2003.

== Big Fish Foundation ==
On January 1, 2020, Brian Chontosh conceptualized and founded the Big Fish Foundation (BFF), an organization with a mission "to enhance Veteran’s lives by reconnecting them to fundamental principles of service in order to reemphasize accountability towards each other through shared common purpose in a campaign to improve psychological wellness, effectively manage post traumatic/combat stress, and prevent suicide." The Big Fish Foundation became an official 501(c)(3) non-profit organization in 2021. Each year, the BFF hosts its annual fundraiser at the Crooked Butterfly Ranch outside of Boulder, CO.

== Other ==
- Brian Chontosh placed 2nd in the SoCal Regional Qualifiers for the 2009 CrossFit Games. The Games were held July 10–12, 2009 in Aromas, CA.

== See also ==
- Operation Phantom Fury
