= Operation Union II =

Part of the Vietnam War (1967)

- Part of Vietnam War
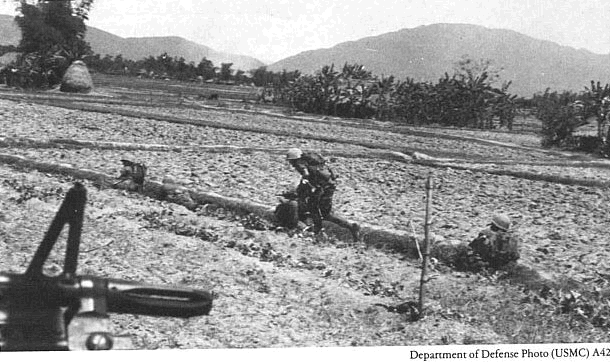
- 3/5 Marines deploy from an HMM-361 helicopter during Operation Union II
Date	26 May – 5 June 1967
Location	Quế Sơn Valley, Quảng Nam and Quang Tin provinces, South Vietnam
Result	U.S./South Vietnamese claim victory

Belligerents
United States; South Vietnam (withdrew May 30)	North Vietnam

Commanders and leaders
(United States) Colonel Kenneth J. Houghton	Unknown

Units involved
(United States) 5th Marine Regiment (South Vietnam) 6th Regiment (South Vietnam) 1st Ranger Group	2nd Division

Casualties and losses
(United States) 110 killed	US body count: 701 killed 23 captured

Operation Union II was a search and destroy mission in the Quế Sơn Valley carried out by the 5th Marine Regiment. Launched on 26 May 1967 the operation ended on 5 June. U.S. reported the People's Army of Vietnam (PAVN) lost 701 killed and 23 captured, while U.S. casualties were 110 killed and 241 wounded.

== Background ==
The Quế Sơn Valley is located along the border of Quảng Nam and Quảng Tín Provinces. During the Vietnam War it lay in the southern part of South Vietnam's I Corps. Populous and rice-rich, the valley was viewed as one of the keys to controlling South Vietnam's five northern provinces by the North Vietnamese and by early 1967 at least two regiments of the PAVN 2nd Division had been infiltrated into the area. The Quế Sơn Valley was also recognized as strategically important by the U.S. Military Assistance Command, Vietnam (MACV). The 1st Battalion, 5th Marines and 3rd Battalion, 5th Marines, experienced units, that had fought in South Vietnam since their arrival in the summer of 1966, were assigned to the valley in 1967 to support the outnumbered the Army of the Republic of Vietnam (ARVN) forces in the area.

During Operation Union from 21 April to 16 May, the 3rd Battalion, 1st Marines had fought the PAVN 21st Regiment near the Marine outpost on Loc Son Mountain for control of the southern part of the Quế Sơn Valley. Operation Union II was launched on 26 May to destroy the withdrawing remnants of the PAVN with a helicopter assault by the 5th Marine Regiment, commanded by Colonel Kenneth J. Houghton. The assault was coordinated with ground attacks by the ARVN 6th Regiment, 2nd Division and the 1st Ranger Group.

== Prelude ==
The plan called for 1/5 Marines, commanded by Lieutenant Colonel Hilgartner, to establish blocking positions in the western portion of the valley while the 3/5 Marines, commanded by Lieutenant Colonel Esslinger, was to make a heliborne assault into the southern part of the valley and sweep northeast. Meanwhile, the three battalions of the ARVN Ranger Group would attack southwest from Thang Binh, while two units of the 6th Regiment attacked northwest from a position near Tam Kỳ. The ARVN named their participation Operation Lien Ket 106.

== Operation ==
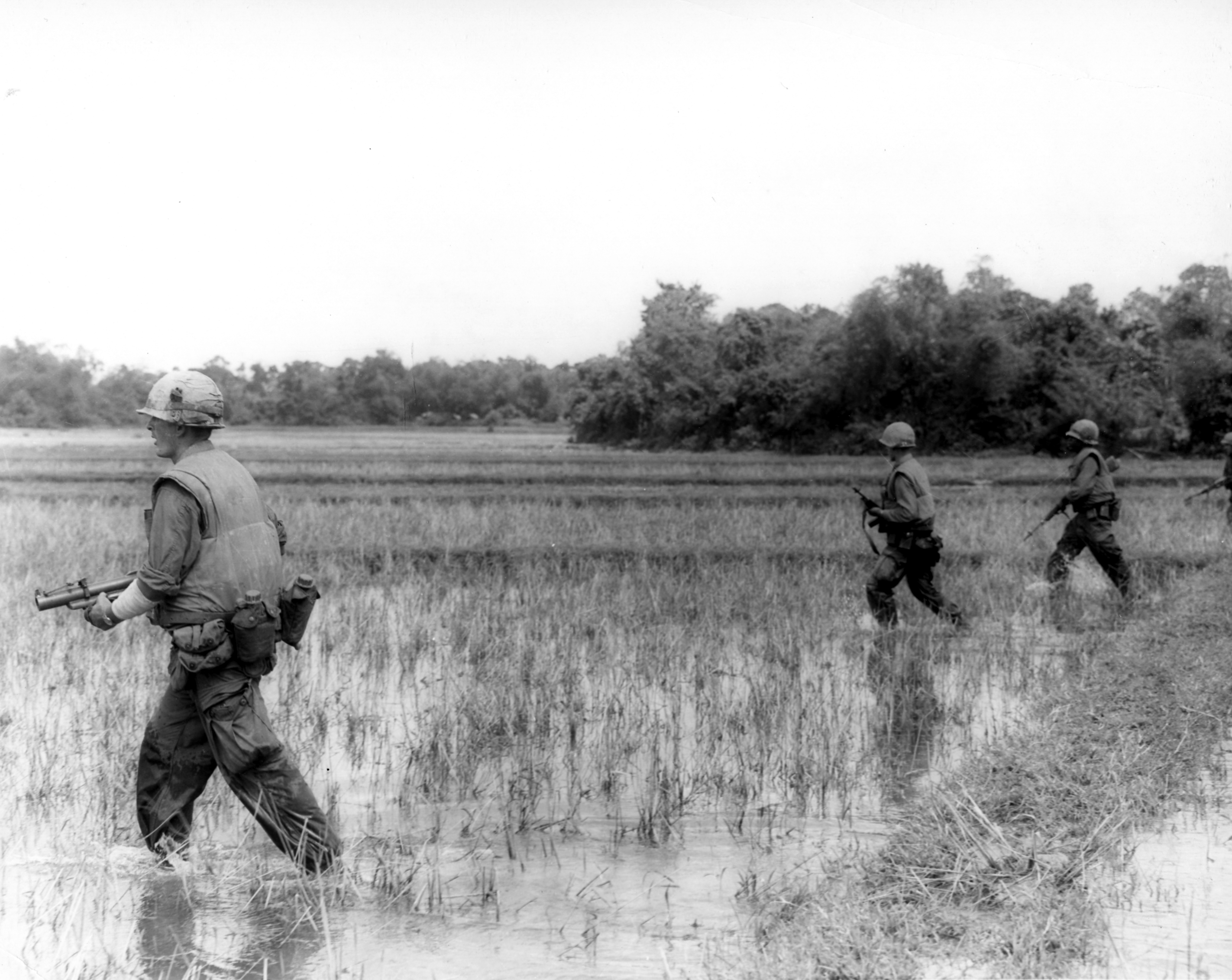
5th Marines cross rice paddies in search of enemy snipers

The operation began the morning of 26 May with the 1/5 Marines and ARVN troop movements proceeding as planned. 3/5 Marines, composed of three infantry companies, one weapons company and a command group, was carried by helicopters to Landing Zone (LZ) Eagle (15.6303°N 108.265°E), an area 5 km east of the Loc Son outpost. The first two waves to arrive at the LZ experienced only light small arms fire, but as the bulk of the battalion landed the LZ was subjected to heavy weapon and mortar fire. At 11:34 the enemy defenders shot down a CH-46A Sea Knight over the LZ. An attack by Companies L and M launched to relieve the pressure on the LZ found a well-entrenched PAVN force, identified as being elements of the PAVN 3rd Regiment, northeast of the LZ.

Supported by artillery and air strikes, Company I enveloped the PAVN's flank, and the Marines soon gained the upper hand. By late afternoon the Marines had overrun the last PAVN positions, counting PAVN 118 dead for Marine losses of 38 killed and 82 wounded.

The Marine and ARVN forces swept the area for the next three days but contacts declined as the PAVN withdrew from the area. Concluding that the enemy had been routed, the ARVN ended their part of the operation.

Houghton however was not convinced and responding to intelligence reports, he directed the 5th Marines to continue sweeping the region. On the morning of 2 June the Regiment was sweeping toward the Vinh Huy Village complex (15.641°N 108.286°E). 3rd Battalion, 1st Marines encountered 200 PAVN troops entrenched 1 km east of the scene of the 26 May battle, engaging and overrunning the PAVN by 13:30. Meanwhile, the 1/5 Marines, pushing forward to relieve pressure on the 3/5 Marines, was ambushed by PAVN troops while crossing a 1,000-meter-wide rice paddy. Caught in a crossfire the Marines were pinned down and consolidated their positions while calling artillery and air strikes on enemy positions. During heavy fighting Company F, commanded by Captain James A. Graham, was decimated. Captain Graham was awarded a posthumous Medal of Honor for defending to the last his company's dead and wounded.

At 14:20 Houghton called for the commitment of the 1st Marine Division's Reserve "Bald Eagle Reactionary Force", a battalion sized reactionary force unit made up of Company E, 2nd Battalion, 5th Marines; Company D, 1st Battalion, 7th Marines; and Company E, 2nd Battalion, 7th Marines and commanded by Lt. Col. Mallett C. Jackson Jr., the Battalion Commander of 2/5 Marines. At 19:00, in total darkness, Companies E, 2/5 Marines and D, 1/7 Marines were inserted by helicopter northeast of the fortified enemy positions and quickly moved south to engage the PAVN's left flank positions in order to relieve battle pressure on the 5th Marine, that were now pinned down by a large entrenched PAVN force The 2 companies quickly moved forward but were soon hit with heavy automatic weapons fire and heavy barrages of large 82 mm high explosive mortar rounds. Company D, 1/7 Marines had taken many casualties and they radioed requests for Medevac choppers, but all requests were denied because of the extreme darkness. However a CH-53 helicopter that had just dropped off the Company E, 2/7 Marines at the original landing zone heard the desperate call and was guided in to the landing zone directly in the middle of the battlefield. When the helicopter returned to Da Nang Air Base, it was noted that it had received a total of 57 holes in its sides from the exploding mortar rounds and automatic weapons fire during the battlefield landing. The sudden presence of the strong Division Reactionary Force on its northern flank caused the PAVN units to disengage and make a hasty withdrawal to the southwest, but the move proved costly to them. Once the PAVN soldiers left the protection of their fortifications, they were easy targets for the Marines supporting arms fire.

The arrival of the Marine reinforcements on its northern flank prompted the PAVN forces to attempt a hasty withdrawal during the night, exposing themselves to Marine supporting arms fire. Meanwhile, the 5th Marines regrouped and evacuated casualties. The Marines themselves suffered 71 killed and 139 wounded in the battle. The following morning, when the battalions swept the battle area, 476 PAVN dead were counted in and around the contested rice paddy and its formidable hedgerow complex and 31 weapons were captured. The PAVN and Marines held an undeclared ceasefire which they each retrieved their dead from the battlefield.

== Aftermath ==
The action of 2–3 June marked the last significant battle of Operation Union II. The Marines claimed PAVN casualties were 701 killed and 23 captured, a favorable ratio to 110 Marines killed and 241 wounded. For actions in both Union I and Union II the 5th Marines and all units under its operational control, including the division reactionary force companies of Company D, 1/7 Marines and Company E, 2/7 Marines received the Presidential Unit Citation for its actions during Operation Union II awarded by President Lyndon Johnson.

For three months, the PAVN 2nd Division was no longer an effective fighting force.
