= James A. Graham (Medal of Honor) =

United States Marine (1940–1967)

James Albert Graham
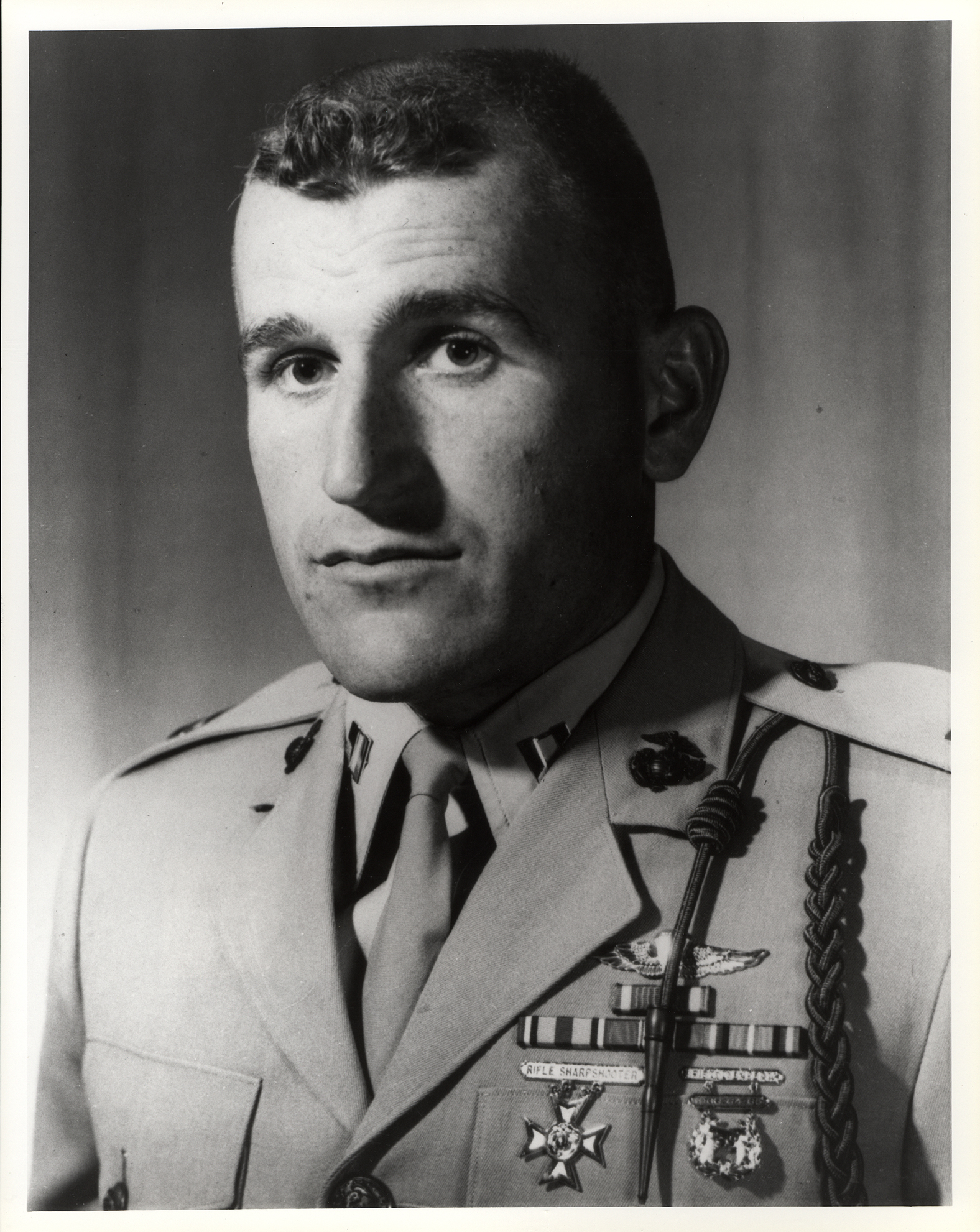
- James A. Graham, Medal of Honor recipient
- Born: August 25, 1940; Wilkinsburg, Pennsylvania, US
- Died: June 2, 1967 (aged 26); Quảng Tín Province, South Vietnam
- Burial place: Arlington National Cemetery
- Military career
- Allegiance: United States of America
- Branch: United States Marine Corps
- Service years: 1955–1957 (United States Army); 1959–1961 (D.C National Guard); 1961–1963 (United States Marine Corps Reserve); 1963–1967 (United States Marine Corps)
- Rank: Captain
- Units: 3rd Battalion 6th Marines; 2nd Battalion 5th Marines
- Conflicts: Vietnam War: Operation Union II †
- Awards: Medal of Honor; Purple Heart

Captain James Albert Graham (August 25, 1940 – June 2, 1967) was a United States Marine who was posthumously awarded the highest U.S. military honor – the Medal of Honor for his heroism and sacrifice of life in June 1967, during the Vietnam War.

James Albert Graham was born on August 25, 1940, in the Pittsburgh suburb of Wilkinsburg, Pennsylvania. He attended high school in Brandywine, Maryland. In June 1963, he received a B.A. degree in Mathematics upon graduation from Frostburg State Teachers College in Frostburg, Maryland. He is seen in a photo and written about in the book "Not Going Home Alone" by James J. Kirschke.

== Military service ==
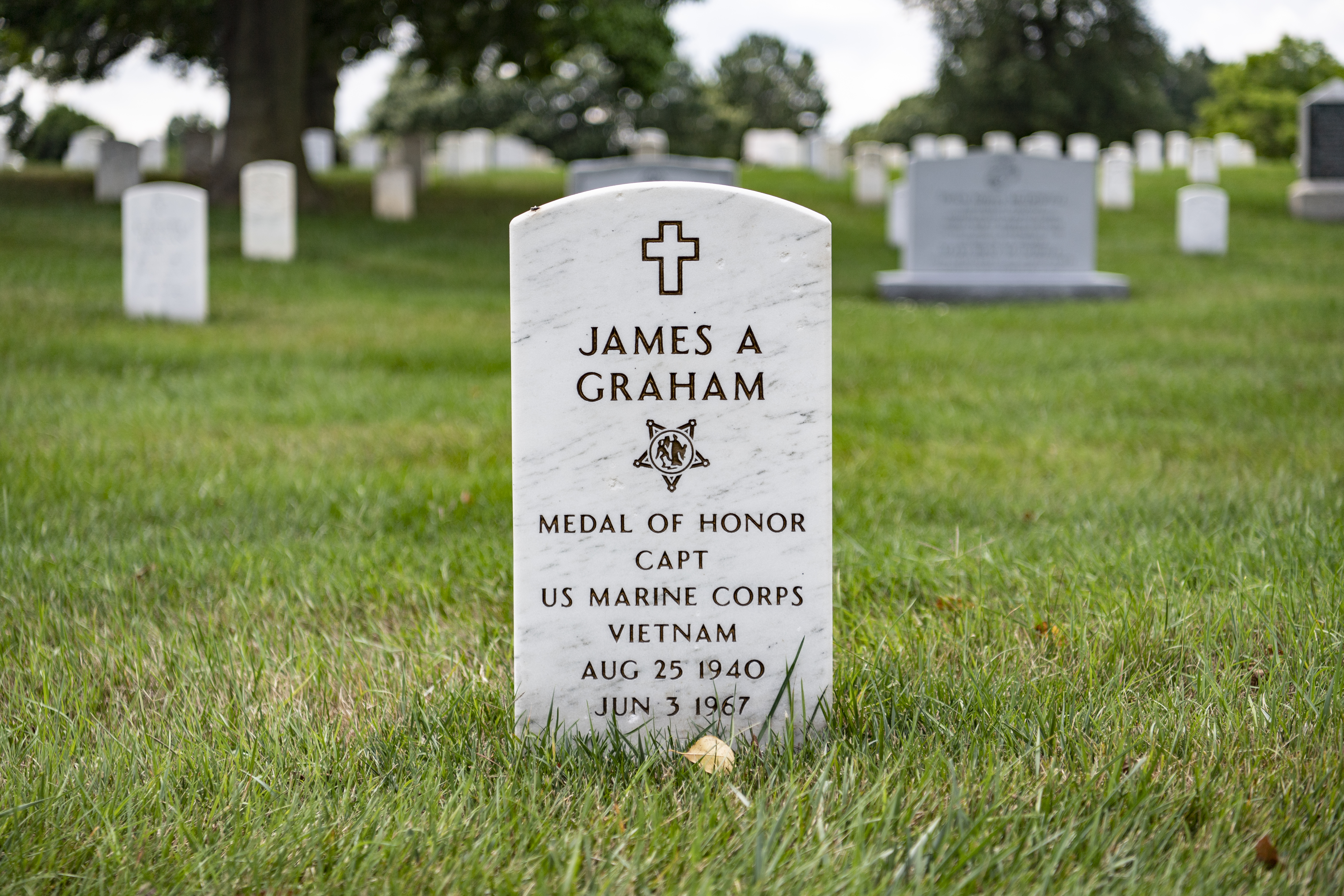
Grave at Arlington National Cemetery

Prior to enlisting in the regular Marine Corps, he was a member of the U.S. Army (1955–1957), the District of Columbia National Guard (1959–61), the U.S. Army Reserve (1961), and the U.S. Marine Corps Reserve (1961–63). He was discharged from the Marine Corps Reserve to accept a regular appointment in the Marine Corps, September 30, 1963.

He then attended the Officers Candidate School, Marine Corps Schools, Quantico, Virginia, and was commissioned a second lieutenant on November 1, 1963.

After completing Officer Candidate School in December, 2dLt Graham commenced naval air basic training at the Naval Air Station Pensacola, Florida. He then attended The Basic School, Marine Corps Schools, Quantico, graduating in November 1964.

In January 1965, he was transferred to the 3rd Battalion, 6th Marines, 2nd Marine Division, Camp Lejeune, North Carolina, and served consecutively as a platoon commander of Company I, Executive Officer of Headquarters and Service Company, and Commanding Officer of Company M. During this period, Lt Graham participated in the American occupation of the Dominican Republic (1965–66) to protect the lives of Americans during the uprising there from April until June 1965. While stationed at Camp Lejeune.

In November 1966, he joined the 2nd Replacement Company, Staging Battalion, Marine Corps Base, Camp Pendleton, California, for transfer to the Republic of Vietnam. Upon arrival in South Vietnam the following month, Capt Graham joined the 2nd Battalion, 5th Marines, 1st Marine Division. He first served as Commanding Officer of Company H, until January 1967, then became Commanding Officer of Company F. While in command of Company F on June 2, 1967, during Operation Union II at Quang Tin, Capt Graham chose to remain with one of his men who could not be moved due to the seriousness of his wounds, and was mortally wounded.

Captain Graham is buried at Arlington National Cemetery, in Arlington, Virginia.

== Awards and decorations ==
A complete list of his medals and decorations includes: the Medal of Honor, the Purple Heart, the Presidential Unit Citation, the Navy Unit Commendation, the Organized Marine Corps Reserve Medal, the National Defense Service Medal, the Armed Forces Expeditionary Medal, the Vietnamese Service Medal with one bronze star, and the Republic of Vietnam Campaign Medal.

1st Row		Medal of Honor		
2nd Row	Purple Heart	Presidential Unit Citation	Navy Unit Commendation	Organized Marine Corps Reserve Medal
3rd Row	National Defense Service Medal	Armed Forces Expeditionary Medal	Vietnam Service Medal with one bronze star	Republic of Vietnam Campaign Medal

== Medal of Honor citation ==
The President of the United States in the name of The Congress takes pride in presenting the MEDAL OF HONOR posthumously to

CAPTAIN JAMES A. GRAHAM
UNITED STATES MARINE CORPS

for service as set forth in the following CITATION:

For conspicuous gallantry and intrepidity at the risk of his life above and beyond the call of duty as Commanding Officer, Company F, Second Battalion, Fifth Marines, First Marine Division, in the Republic of Vietnam on 2 June 1967. During Operation UNION II, the First Battalion, Fifth Marines, consisting of Companies A and D, with Captain Graham's company attached, launched an attack against an enemy occupied position, with two companies assaulting and one in reserve. Company F, a leading company, was proceeding across a clear paddy area, one thousand meters wide, attacking toward the assigned objective, when it came under heavy fire from mortars and small arms which immediately inflicted a large number of casualties. Hardest hit by the enemy fire was the second platoon of Company F, which was pinned down in the open paddy area by intense fire from two concealed machine guns. Forming an assault unit from members of his small company headquarters, Captain Graham boldly led a fierce assault through the second platoon's position, forcing the enemy to abandon the first machine-gun position, thereby relieving some of the pressure on his second platoon and enabling evacuation of the wounded to a more secure area. Resolute to silence the second machine-gun, which continued its devastating fire, Captain Graham's small force stood steadfast in its hard won enclave. Subsequently, during the afternoon's fierce fighting, he suffered two minor wounds while personally accounting for an estimated fifteen enemy killed. With the enemy position remaining invincible upon each attempt to silence it and with their supply of ammunition exhausted, Captain Graham ordered those remaining in the small force to withdraw to friendly lines, and although knowing that he had no chance of survival, he chose to remain with one man who could not be moved due to the seriousness of his wounds. The last radio transmission from Captain Graham reported that he was being assaulted by a force of twenty-five enemy; he died while protecting himself and the wounded man he chose not to abandon. Captain Graham's actions throughout the day were a series of heroic achievements. His outstanding courage, superb leadership and indomitable fighting spirit undoubtedly saved the second platoon from annihilation and reflected great credit upon himself, the Marine Corps, and the United States Naval Service. He gallantly gave his life for his country.

/S/ LYNDON B. JOHNSON

== See also ==
- List of Medal of Honor recipients
- List of Medal of Honor recipients for the Vietnam War
