= Gary W. Martini =

United States Marine Corps Medal of Honor recipient (1948–1967)

Gary Wayne Martini
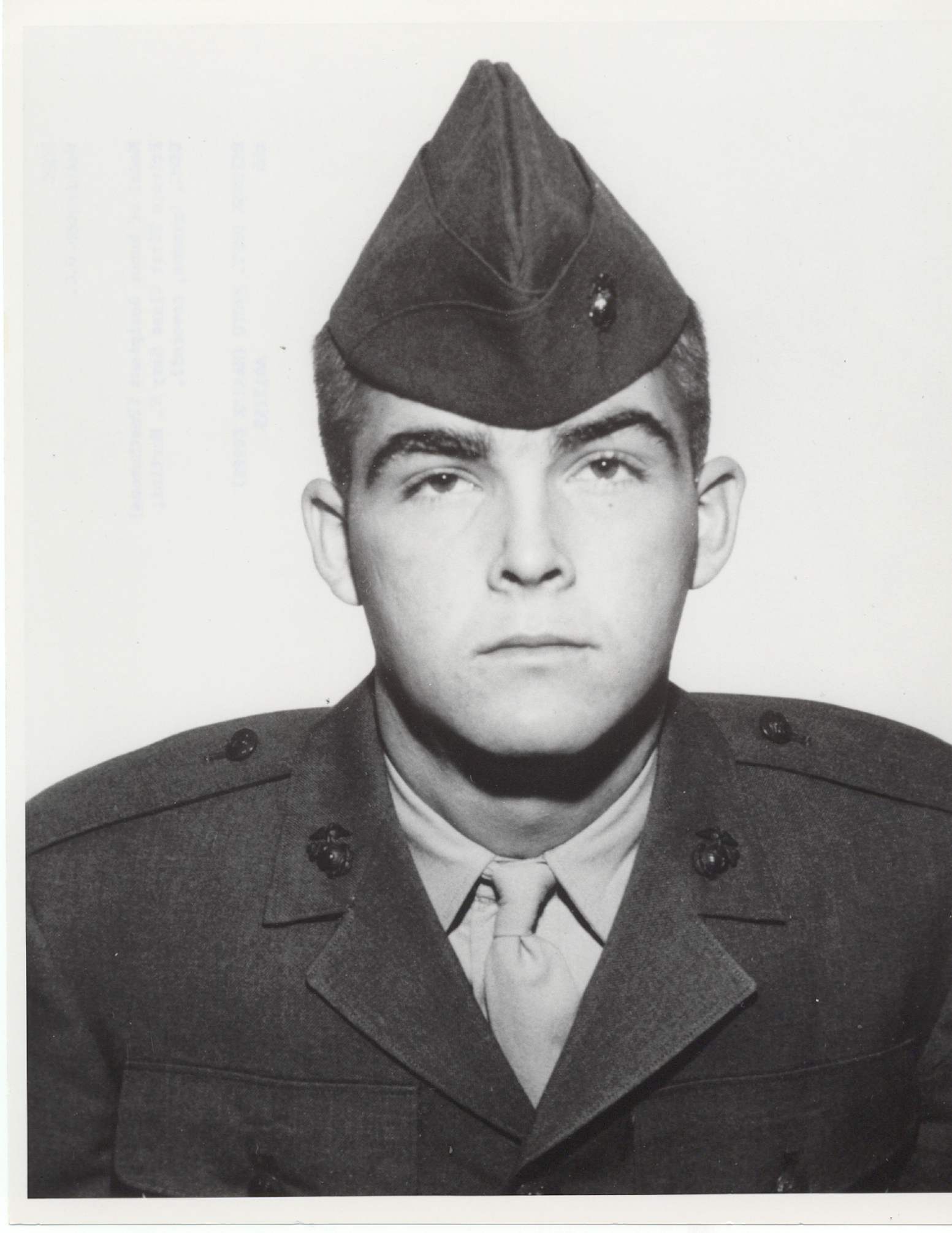
- Gary W. Martini, Medal of Honor recipient
- Born: September 21, 1948; Lexington, Virginia, U.S.
- Died: April 21, 1967 (aged 18); Bình Sơn District, Quang Ngai Province, Republic of Vietnam
- Burial place: Rosewood Cemetery, Lewisburg, West Virginia.
- Military career
- Allegiance: United States of America
- Branch: United States Marine Corps
- Service years: 1966–1967
- Rank: Private First Class
- Units: 2nd Battalion 8th Marines; 2nd Battalion 1st Marines
- Conflicts: Vietnam War: Operation Union †
- Awards: Medal of Honor; Purple Heart

Private First Class Gary Wayne Martini (September 21, 1948 – April 21, 1967) was a United States Marine who posthumously received the Medal of Honor for heroism in April 1967 during the Vietnam War.

== Early years ==
Martini was born on September 21, 1948, in Lexington, Virginia. His early education was completed in Frankford, West Virginia, where he participated in intramural sports. After moving with his parents to Charleston, West Virginia, he attended Stonewall Jackson High School through the 11th grade. His family then moved temporarily to Portland, Oregon, and Gary attended David Douglas High School until February 1966.

== Marine Corps service ==
On March 3, 1966, Gary Martini enlisted in the United States Marine Corps in Portland, Oregon and was ordered to Marine Corps Recruit Depot San Diego, California. He received recruit training with the 3rd Recruit Training Battalion, and upon graduation in May, was transferred to Marine Corps Base Camp Pendleton, California, where he underwent individual combat training with the 1st Battalion, 2nd Infantry Training Regiment.

He attended the Battalion Infantry Training School at Marine Corps Base, Camp Pendleton, for one month prior to being transferred to Marine Corps Base, Camp Lejeune, North Carolina in July 1966. After his arrival at Camp Lejeune, he was assigned duty as a rifleman with Company F, 2nd Battalion, 8th Marines, 2nd Marine Division. While serving in this capacity, he was promoted to private first class in September 1966.

Transferred to the Far East in the Republic of Vietnam in December 1966, PFC Martini joined Company F, 2nd Battalion, 1st Marines, 1st Marine Division. During Operation Union at Binh Son, Da Nang, on April 21, 1967, he was mortally wounded when he went to the aid of his wounded comrades.

== Medals and decorations ==
His medals and decorations include: the Medal of Honor, the Purple Heart, the National Defense Service Medal, the Vietnam Service Medal with one bronze star, and the Republic of Vietnam Campaign Medal.

Medal of Honor		Purple Heart
National Defense Service Medal	Vietnam Service Medal with one bronze star	Vietnam Campaign Medal

== Legacy ==
- Martini Hall (Building #622) at Marine Corps Recruit Depot San Diego is named in honor of Martini, who completed his recruit training at MCRD San Diego in 1966.
- Martini's name is inscribed on the Vietnam War Memorial on Panel 8E, 61.
- Martini Hall at Camp Horno in Camp Pendleton, California is a chowhall named in honor of Martini.
- Gary Wayne Martini Memorial Bridge, at the intersection of I-64 and Route 219, in Lewisburg, West Virginia is named in his honor.

== Medal of Honor citation ==
The President of the United States in the name of The Congress takes pride in presenting the MEDAL OF HONOR posthumously to

PRIVATE FIRST CLASS GARY W. MARTINI
UNITED STATES MARINE CORPS

for service as set forth in the following CITATION:

For conspicuous gallantry and intrepidity at the risk of his life above and beyond the call of duty while serving as a Rifleman, Company F, Second Battalion, First Marines, First Marine Division in the Republic of Vietnam. On 21 April 1967, during Operation UNION, elements of Company F, conducting offensive operations at Binh Son, encountered a firmly entrenched enemy force and immediately deployed to engage them. The Marines in Private Martini's platoon assaulted across an open rice paddy to within twenty meters of the enemy trench line where they were suddenly struck by hand grenades, intense small arms, automatic weapons, and mortar fire. The enemy onslaught killed 14 and wounded 18 Marines, pinning the remainder of the platoon down behind a low paddy dike. In the face of imminent danger, Private Martini immediately crawled over the dike to a forward open area within 15 meters of the enemy position where, continuously exposed to the hostile fire, he hurled hand grenades, killing several of the enemy. Crawling back through the intense fire, he rejoined his platoon which had moved to the relative safety of a trench line. From this position he observed several of his wounded comrades lying helpless in the fire swept paddy. Although he knew that one man had been killed, attempting to assist the wounded, Private Martini raced through the open area and dragged a comrade back to the friendly position. In spite of a serious wound received during this first daring rescue, he again braved the unrelenting fury of the enemy fire to aid another companion lying wounded only twenty meters in front of the enemy trench line. As he reached the fallen Marine, he received a mortal wound, but disregarding his own condition, he began to drag the Marine toward his platoon's position. Observing men from his unit attempting to leave the security of their position to aid him, concerned only for their safety, he called to them to remain under cover and through a final supreme effort, moved his injured comrade to where he could be pulled to safety, before he fell, succumbing to his wounds. Stouthearted and indomitable, Private Martini unhesitatingly yielded his own life to save two of his comrades and insure the safety of the remainder of his platoon. His outstanding courage, valiant fighting spirit and selfless devotion to duty reflected the highest credit upon himself, the Marine Corps, and the United States Naval Service. He gallantly gave his life for his country.

/S/ LYNDON B. JOHNSON

== See also ==
- List of Medal of Honor recipients
- List of Medal of Honor recipients for the Vietnam War
