= Shadow of the Sword =

Autobiography by Jeremiah Workman and John Bruning

Shadow of the Sword: a Marine's journey of war, heroism, and redemption
- Author: Jeremiah Workman, John R Bruning
- Language: English
- Genre: History
- Publisher: Ballantine Books
- Publication date: 2009
- Publication place: United States
- Media type: Print (hardcover)
- Pages: 253 pages
- ISBN: 9780345512123
- OCLC: 290468892
- LC Class: DS79.76 .W67 2009

Shadow of the Sword: A Marine's Journey of War, Heroism, and Redemption (ISBN 978-0-345-51212-3) is an autobiographical account of post-traumatic stress disorder by Jeremiah Workman, who served with the US Marine Corps in the Iraq War.

Workman received the Navy Cross for gallantry under fire after killing twenty insurgents in Fallujah, Iraq, on December 23, 2004, but later suffered flashbacks reliving the death of three fellow marines in the battle. He also describes having been ordered to "push at least two recruits into suicide attempts" while a drill instructor, an episode that a WSJ reviewer calls "the only part of the book that sounds implausible, given the standards that define the Marines".
