= Quế Sơn district =

Coordinates: 15°41′N 108°10′E

Quế Sơn district Huyện Quế Sơn
- District
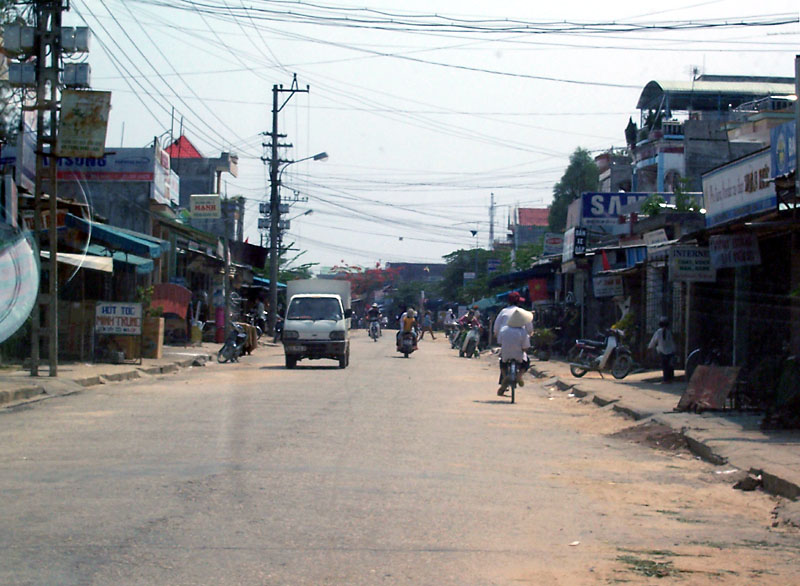
- Street view

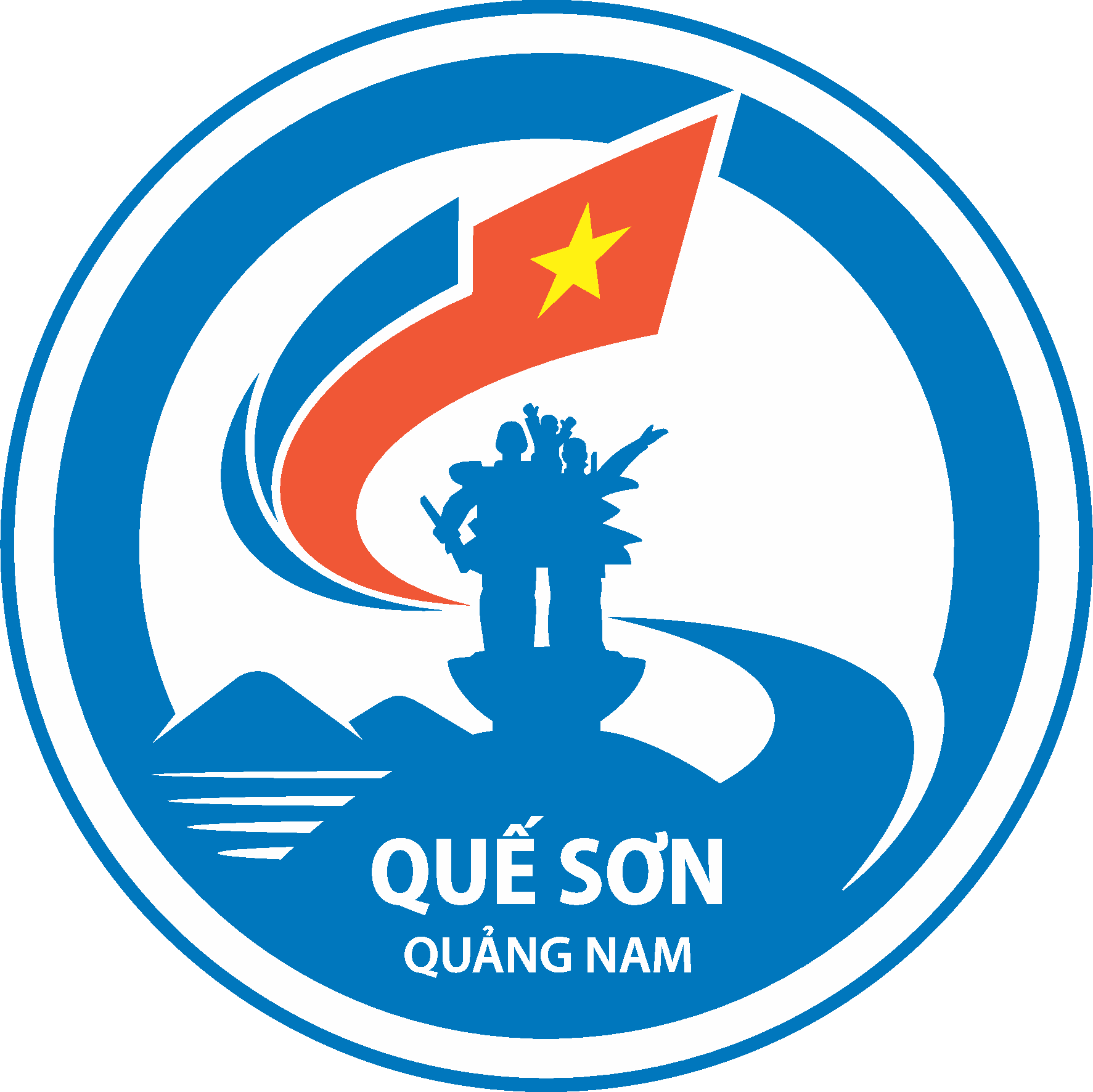
- Seal

- Location within Vietnam Location within Southeast Asia Location within Asia
- Country: Vietnam
- Region: South Central Coast
- Province: Quảng Nam
- Capital: Đông Phú

Area
  - Total: 273 sq mi (707 km^{2})

Population (2003)
  - Total: 129,190
- Time zone: UTC+7 (Indochina Time)

Quế Sơn is a former district (huyện) in Quảng Nam province, Vietnam. During the Vietnam War, it was the site of heavy fighting, including Operation Unions I and II. From 1962 to 1967, the southern side of the valley was part of Quảng Tín province.

As of 2003, the district had a population of 129,190. The district covers an area of 707 km^{2} (273 sq mi). The district capital lies at Đông Phú.
