= Quảng Tín province =

Historic province of Vietnam

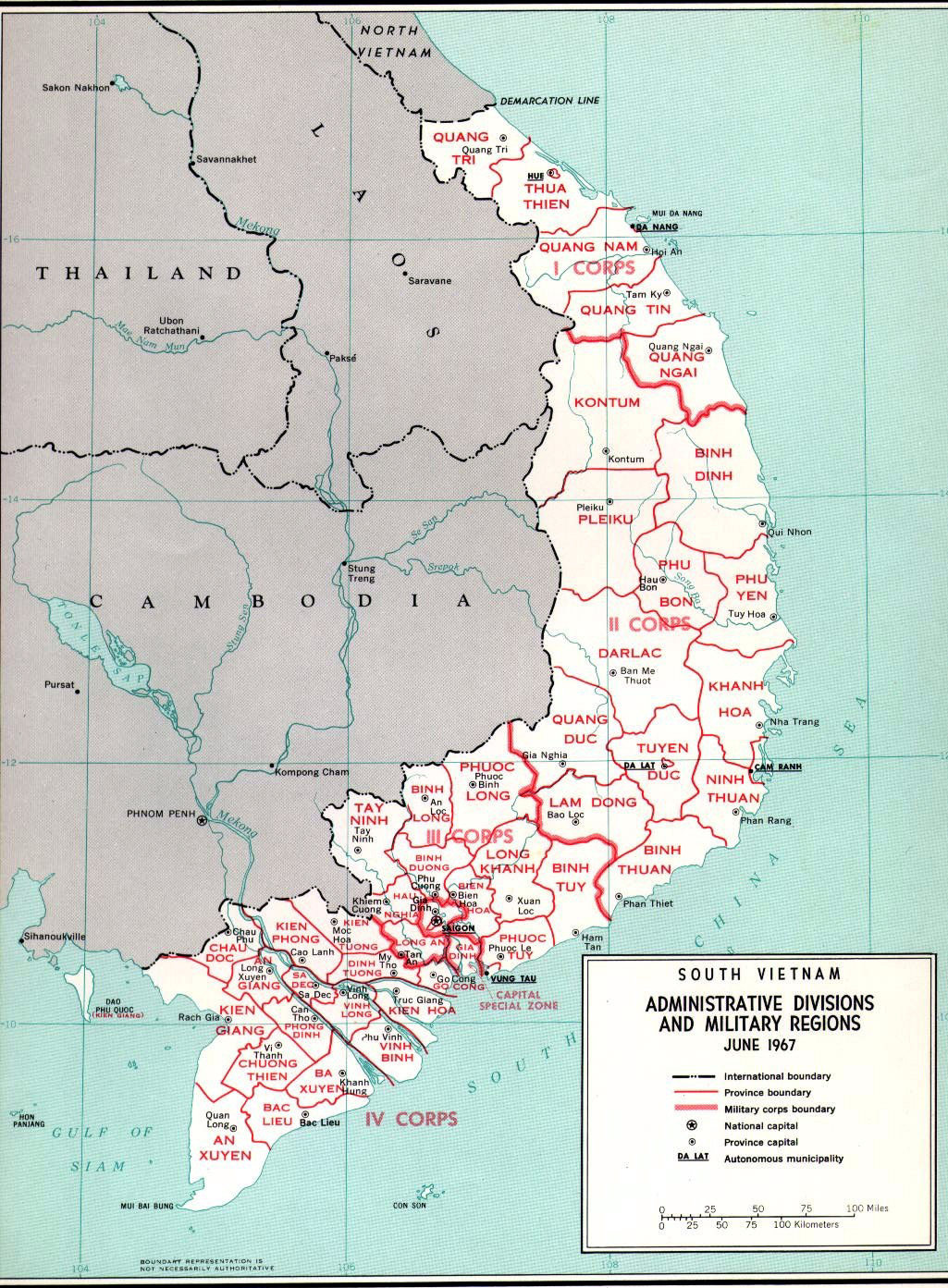
Administrative map of the Republic of Vietnam in 1967

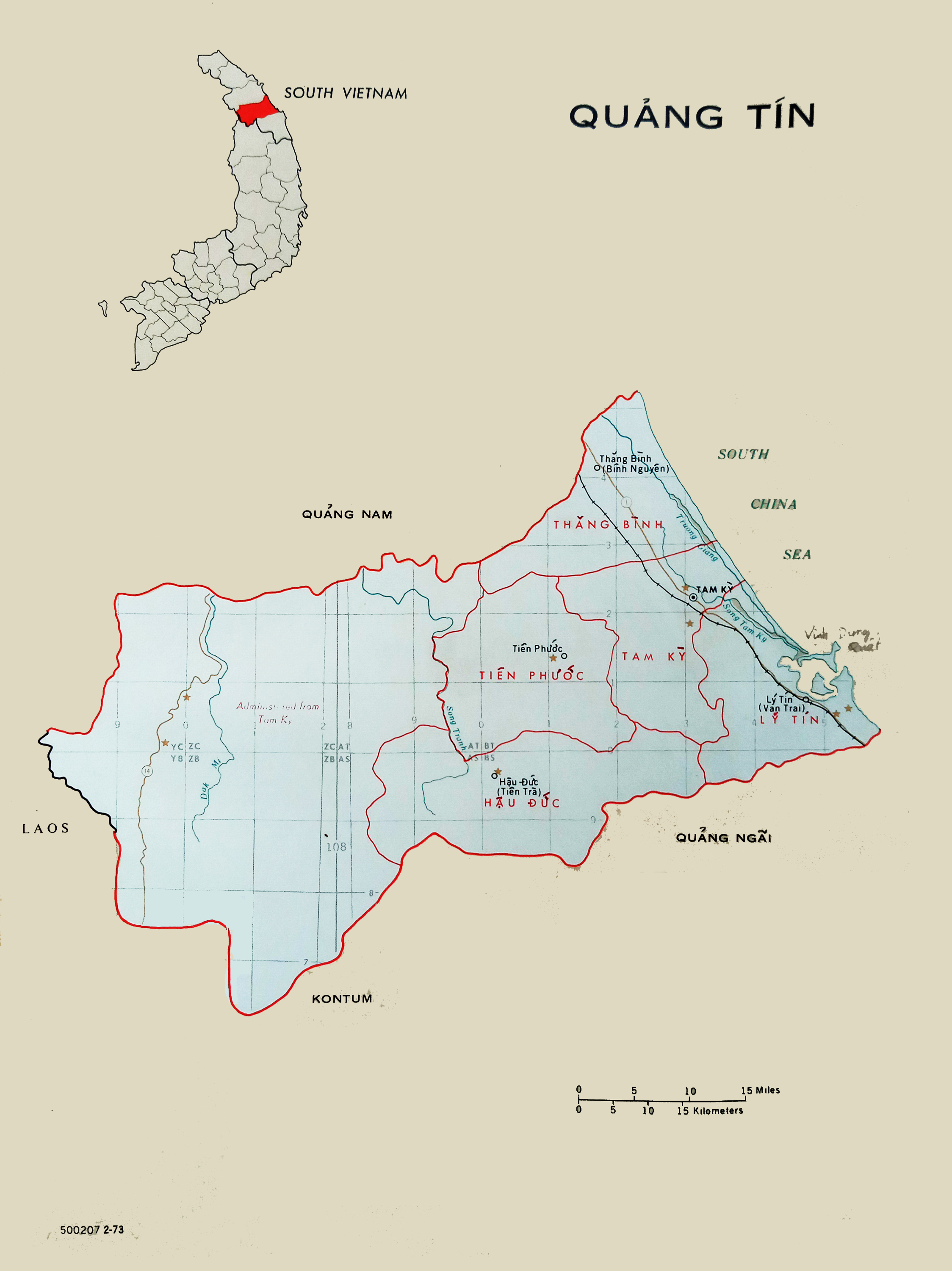
Administrative map of Quảng Tín province in 1973

Administrative units of Quảng Tín
Districts (Quận)	Population (1965)	Number of communes (xã)
Hậu Đức	12,032	14
Hiệp Đức	15,242	14
Lý Tín	49,010	8
Tam Kỳ	140,787	19
Tiên Phước	34,462	12
Thăng Bình	109,564	19
Total	361,097	86

Quảng Tín was a province of South Vietnam that was created from Quảng Nam's Quế Sơn District on July 31, 1962. Its capital was Tam Kỳ.

As of the 1965 census the province had a population of 361,097 inhabitants, divided among six districts (quận), 86 communes (xã) and 419 hamlets (ấp).

During the Vietnam War it was the site of heavy fighting, including Operation Union I & II. The province was remerged with Quảng Nam following the unification of the Socialist Republic of Vietnam on July 2, 1976.
