= Operation Union =

Part of the Vietnam War (1967)

- Part of the Vietnam War
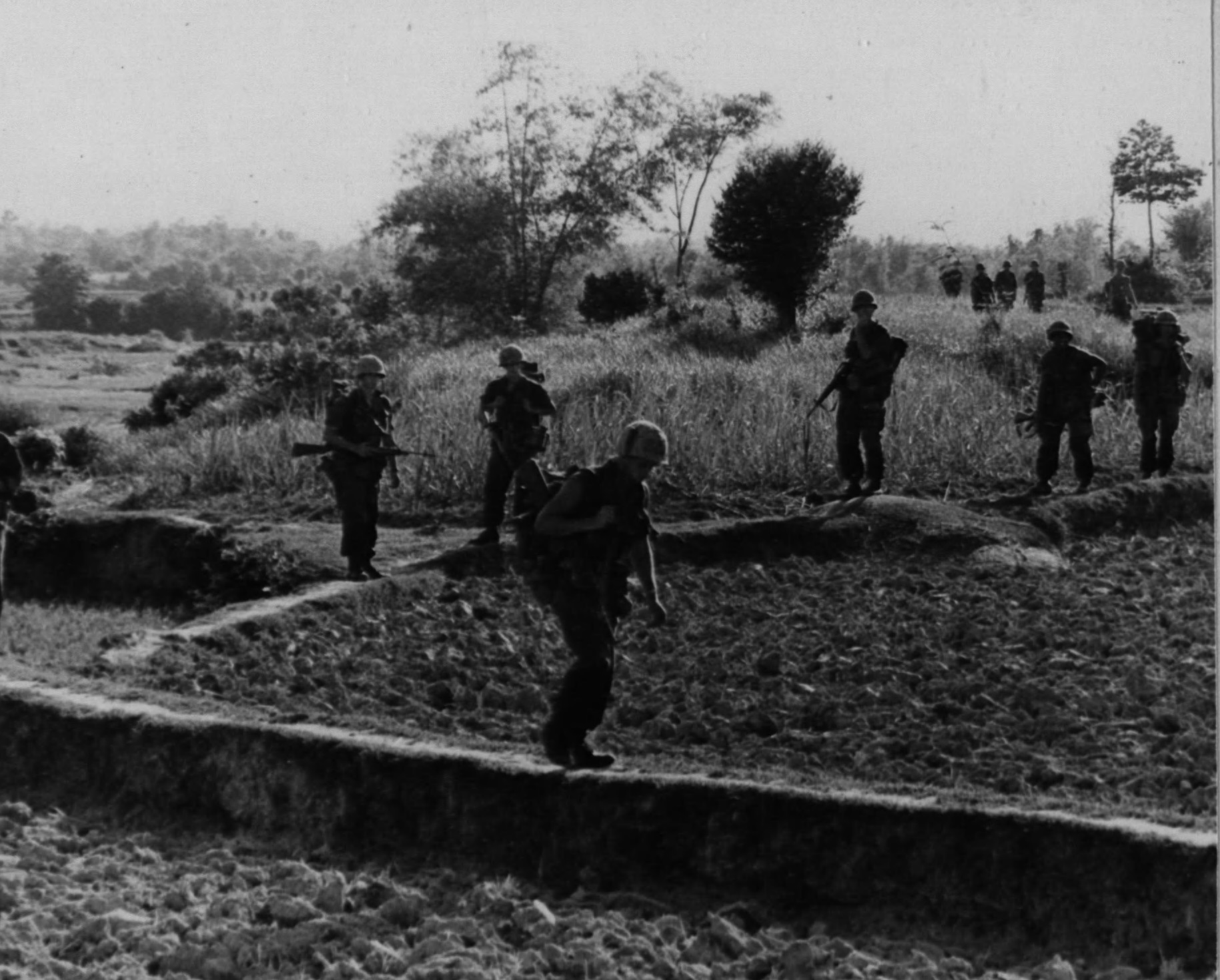
- Marines cross paddy dikes
Date	21 April – 16 May 1967
Location	Que Son Valley, South Vietnam

Belligerents
United States	North Vietnam

Commanders and leaders
MG Herman Nickerson Jr. Lt. Col. Peter Hilgartner	

Units involved
1st Battalion, 1st Marines; 2nd Battalion, 1st Marines; 3rd Battalion, 1st Marines; 1st Battalion, 5th Marines	2nd Division

Casualties and losses
110 killed 2 missing	865 killed

Operation Union was a search and destroy mission in the Que Son Valley carried out by the 1st Marine Regiment from 21 April to 16 May 1967. The object of the operation was to engage the People’s Army of Vietnam (PAVN) 2nd Division.

== Background ==
The Quế Sơn Valley is located along the border of Quảng Nam and Quảng Tín Provinces. During the Vietnam War it lay in the southern part of South Vietnam's I Corps. Populous and rice-rich, the valley was viewed as one of the keys to controlling South Vietnam's five northern provinces by the communists and by early 1967 at least two regiments of the PAVN 2nd Division had been infiltrated into the area.

The 5th Marine Regiment minus its 2nd Battalion, an experienced force that had fought in Vietnam since their arrival in mid-1966, was assigned to the valley in 1967 to support the outnumbered Army of the Republic of Vietnam (ARVN) forces in the area, the 6th ARVN Regiment and the 1st Ranger Group.

Since mid-January 1967 Company F, a reinforced company of the 2nd Battalion, 1st Marines, had manned an outpost atop Nui Loc Son (Loc Son Mountain), which dominated the southern Que Son Valley. Although the PAVN and Vietcong (VC) forces operating in the valley did not initially take much notice of the Marines, on April 15, 1967, the Company F commander advised Colonel Emil Radics, the commander of the 1st Marine Regiment, that PAVN/VC units appeared to be preparing for an all-out assault on the outpost.

Radics developed a plan for a multi-battalion assault and sweep aimed at clearing PAVN units from the vicinity of the mountain. The plan was approved as Operation Union by Major General Herman Nickerson Jr., the commanding general of the 1st Marine Division on April 20 and was put into action the following morning.

== Battle ==
Acting as bait, Company F was ordered to leave its outpost to sweep toward Binh Son, the nearest enemy-held village complex. Contact with PAVN elements began around 07:00, shortly developing into a full battle. PFC Gary W. Martini would be posthumously awarded the Medal of Honor for his actions during the battle. The Marine company was soon pinned down in a tree line near Binh Son, thereby fixing the PAVN forces who were soon subjected to a withering air and artillery bombardment. This allowed Company F to attack into Binh Son as the 3rd Battalion, 1st Marines, arrived to support them via a helicopter assault.

The main body of the 3/1 Marines fought into the village to join Company F in engaging the enemy while other elements of the battalion landed from helicopters east of the battlefield to block the PAVN's most likely escape route. During the afternoon, United States Army 175 mm self-propelled artillery and Marine 105 mm howitzers established separate firebases near the battlefield, and that evening the 1st Battalion, 1st Marines landed atop Nui Loc Son.

On the morning of 22 April the PAVN had been driven out of Binh Son and withdrew to the north. On 25 April the 5th Marine Regiment relieved the 1st Marine Regiment in the valley.

On 27 April a Marine triggered a land mine in a landing zone which set off a series of secondary explosions resulting in 1 Marine killed and 43 wounded.

On 10 May, Company C 1/5 Marines became pinned down by PAVN fire on Hill 110, two more Companies from 1/3 Marines were sent to support them which also came under fire and were unable to advance. Company A 1/5 Marines was sent in support, but as it began its assault a forward air controller misplaced an airstrike on their position resulting in 5 Marines killed and 24 wounded stopping their assault. Company D 1/5 Marines then moved to outflank the PAVN position while Company M 3/5 Marines also joined the battle. By evening the Marines had overrun the PAVN positions killing 116 PAVN for the loss of 33 Marines killed and 135 wounded.

On 13 May the 1/5 Marines engaged a PAVN Battalion killing 122 PAVN. On 15 May Companies A and M found a PAVN bunker complex and called in air and artillery struck, 22 PAVN bodies were found in the wreckage.

== Aftermath ==
Operation Union concluded with US forces claiming that the PAVN suffered 865 casualties for the loss of 110 Marine dead, 2 missing and 473 wounded.

The 5th Marine Regiment was awarded the Presidential Unit Citation awarded by President Lyndon Johnson.

On 26 May, 5th Marines, which had assumed control of the latter stages of Operation Union, kicked off Operation Union II.
