= Russell A. Steindam =

Russell Albert Steindam
- Army Medal of Honor
- Born: August 27, 1946; Austin, Texas, U.S.
- Died: February 1, 1970 (aged 23); Tay Ninh Province, Republic of Vietnam
- Burial place: Restland Memorial Park, Dallas, Texas
- Military career
- Allegiance: United States of America
- Branch: United States Army
- Service years: 1968–1970
- Rank: First Lieutenant
- Units: 4th Cavalry Regiment, 25th Infantry Division
- Conflicts: Vietnam War †
- Awards: Medal of Honor; Purple Heart

Russell Albert Steindam (August 27, 1946 – February 1, 1970) was a United States Army officer and a recipient of the United States military's highest decoration—the Medal of Honor—for his actions in the Vietnam War. Steindam grew up in Plano, Texas, where his family moved when he was five years old. He graduated at the top of his class from Plano High School before entering the University of Texas. The Collin County Courthouse in McKinney, Texas, is named after Lieutenant Steindam.

== Biography ==
Steindam joined the army from his birth city of Austin, Texas, in 1968. On October 1, 1969, he arrived in South Vietnam; and by February 1, 1970, he was serving as a first lieutenant in Troop B, 3rd Squadron, 4th Cavalry Regiment, 25th Infantry Division. On that day, in Tay Ninh Province, South Vietnam, during Operation Toan Thang IV, Steindam covered an enemy-thrown hand grenade with his body, protecting his fellow soldiers at the expense of his own life.

Steindam, aged 23 at his death, was buried in Restland Memorial Park, in Dallas, Texas.

== Medal of Honor citation ==
First Lieutenant Steindam's official Medal of Honor citation reads:

For conspicuous gallantry and intrepidity in action at the risk of his life above and beyond the call of duty. 1st Lt. Steindam, Troop B, while serving as a platoon leader, led members of his platoon on a night ambush operation. On the way to the ambush site, suspected enemy movement was detected on 1 flank and the platoon's temporary position was subjected to intense small arms and automatic weapons fire as well as a fusillade of hand and rocket-propelled grenades. After the initial barrage, 1st Lt. Steindam ordered fire placed on the enemy position and the wounded men to be moved to a shallow bomb crater. As he directed the return fire against the enemy from his exposed position, a fragmentation grenade was thrown into the site occupied by his command group. Instantly realizing the extreme gravity of the situation, 1st Lt. Steindam shouted a warning to alert his fellow soldiers in the immediate vicinity. Then, unhesitatingly and with complete disregard for his safety, 1st Lt. Steindam deliberately threw himself on the grenade, absorbing the full and fatal force of the explosion as it detonated. By his gallant action and self-sacrifice, he was able to save the lives of the nearby members of his command group. The extraordinary courage and selflessness displayed by 1st Lt. Steindam were an inspiration to his comrades and are in the highest traditions of the U.S. Army.

== See also ==
- List of Medal of Honor recipients for the Vietnam War
