= Danny J. Petersen =

Danny John Petersen
- Army Medal of Honor
- Born: March 11, 1949; Horton, Kansas, US
- Died: January 9, 1970 (aged 20); Tay Ninh Province, Republic of Vietnam
- Burial place: Netawaka Cemetery, Netawaka, Kansas
- Military career
- Allegiance: United States of America
- Branch: United States Army
- Service years: 1968–1970
- Rank: Specialist Four
- Units: 23rd Infantry Regiment, 25th Infantry Division
- Conflicts: Vietnam War †
- Awards: Medal of Honor; Bronze Star; Army Commendation Medal with oak leaf cluster Purple Heart

Danny John Petersen (March 11, 1949 – January 9, 1970) was a United States Army soldier and a recipient of the United States military's highest decoration—the Medal of Honor—for his actions in the Vietnam War.

== Biography ==
Petersen joined the Army from Oskaloosa, Kansas in 1968, and by January 9, 1970, was serving as a specialist four in Company B, 4th Battalion, 23rd Infantry Regiment, 25th Infantry Division. On that day, in Tay Ninh Province, South Vietnam, during Operation Toan Thang IV Petersen repeatedly exposed himself and his armored personnel carrier (APC) to enemy fire in order to protect the other soldiers of his unit. After his vehicle was disabled, he carried a wounded comrade to safety before returning to his APC where he provided covering fire so others could withdraw until he was mortally wounded.

Petersen, aged 20 at his death, was buried in Netawaka Cemetery, Netawaka, Kansas. A portion of US-75 from Holton to Netawaka is named the "Danny J. Petersen Memorial Highway" in his honor.

== Medal of Honor citation ==
Specialist Petersen's official Medal of Honor citation reads:

Specialist Petersen distinguished himself while serving as an armored personnel carrier commander with Company B during a combat operation against a North Vietnamese Army Force estimated to be of battalion size. During the initial contact with the enemy, an armored personnel carrier was disabled and the crewmen were pinned down by the heavy onslaught of enemy small arms, automatic weapons and rocket-propelled grenade fire. Spec. Petersen immediately maneuvered his armored personnel carrier to a position between the disabled vehicle and the enemy. He placed suppressive fire on the enemy's well-fortified position, thereby enabling the crewmembers of the disabled personnel carrier to repair their vehicle. He then maneuvered his vehicle, while still under heavy hostile fire to within 10 feet of the enemy's defensive emplacement. After a period of intense fighting, his vehicle received a direct hit and the driver was wounded. With extraordinary courage and selfless disregard for his own safety, Spec. Petersen carried his wounded comrade 45 meters across the bullet-swept field to a secure area. He then voluntarily returned to his disabled armored personnel carrier to provide covering fire for both the other vehicles and the dismounted personnel of his platoon as they withdrew. Despite heavy fire from 3 sides, he remained with his disabled vehicle, alone and completely exposed. Spec. Petersen was standing on top of his vehicle, firing his weapon, when he was mortally wounded. His heroic and selfless actions prevented further loss of life in his platoon. Spec. Petersen's conspicuous gallantry and extraordinary heroism are in the highest traditions of the service and reflect great credit on him, his unit, and the U.S. Army.

== See also ==
- List of Medal of Honor recipients
- List of Medal of Honor recipients for the Vietnam War
