= John D. Hawk =

American soldier and Medal of Honor recipient

John Druse Hawk
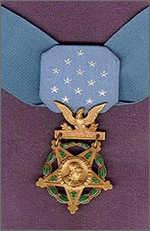
- John D. Hawk, Medal of Honor recipient
- Born: May 30, 1924; San Francisco, California
- Died: November 4, 2013 (aged 89); Bremerton, Washington
- Burial place: Miller-Woodland Memorial Park, Bremerton, Washington
- Military career
- Allegiance: United States of America
- Branch: United States Army
- Service years: 1943 - 1945
- Rank: Sergeant
- Nickname: "Bud"
- Units: 2nd Battalion, 359th Infantry Regiment, 90th Infantry Division
- Conflicts: World War II • Falaise pocket
- Awards: Medal of Honor; Purple Heart (4)

John Druse "Bud" Hawk (May 30, 1924 − November 4, 2013) was a United States Army soldier and a recipient of the United States military's highest decoration, the Medal of Honor, for his actions in World War II during the battle of the Falaise pocket.

== Biography ==
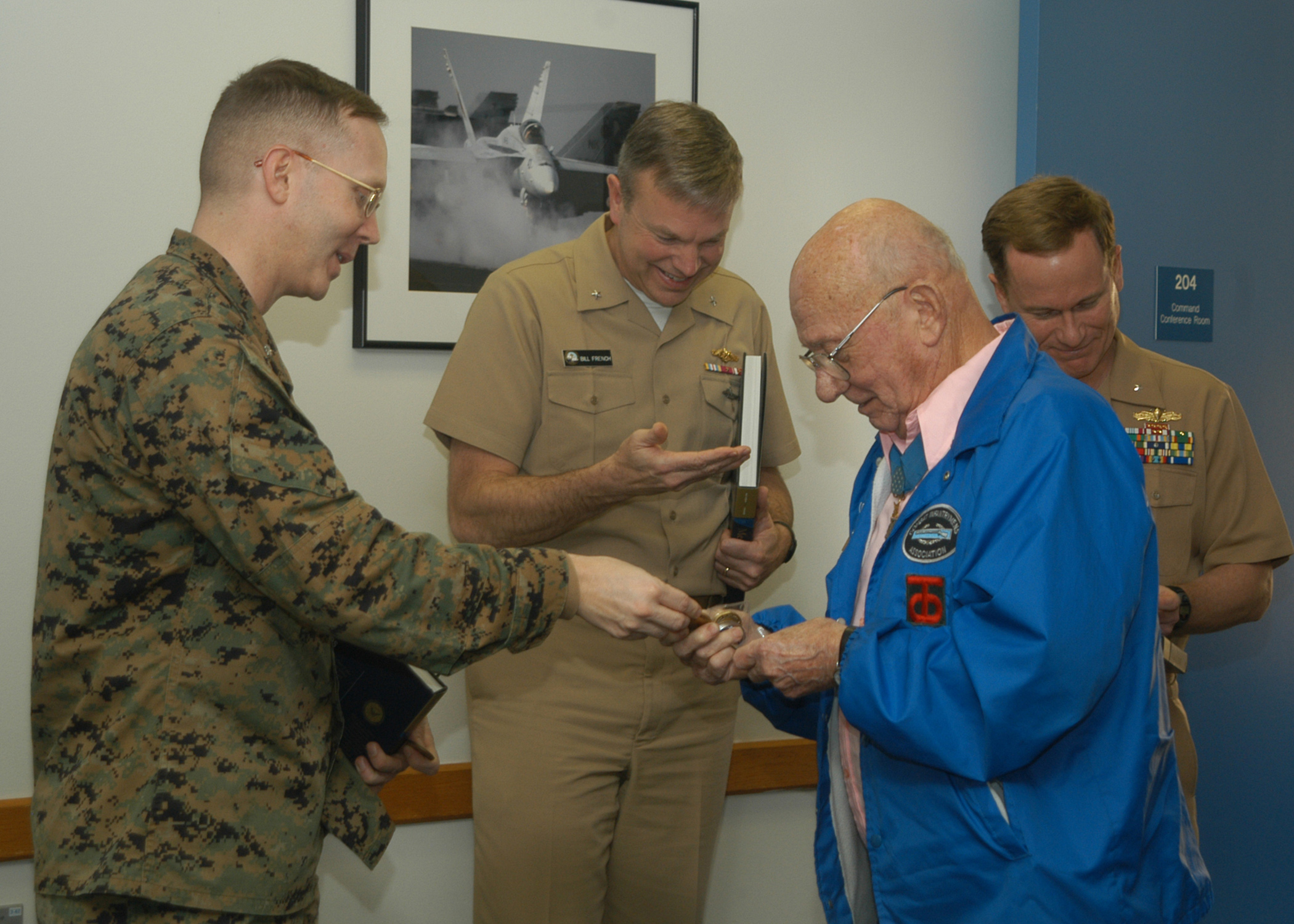
Bud Hawk, third from left, is presented with a command coin while visiting Naval Base Kitsap in 2007.

Hawk was born in San Francisco, California, and grew up in the Rolling Bay area of Bainbridge Island, Washington. He graduated from Bainbridge High School in 1943 and joined the Army two weeks later from Bremerton, Washington.

By August 20, 1944, Hawk was serving in Europe as a sergeant in Company E, 359th Infantry Regiment, 90th Infantry Division. During a German counterattack on that day, near Chambois, France, he was wounded in the right thigh while taking cover behind a tree. A German shell had penetrated the tree trunk. ("French apple trees aren't worth a darn," he said in 1994.) Hawk continued to fight and, in order to direct the shots of friendly tank destroyers, he willingly exposed himself to intense enemy fire. For his actions during the battle, he was awarded the Medal of Honor on July 13, 1945. The medal was formally presented to him by President Harry Truman.

Hawk recovered from his wounds and continued to serve in combat. He was wounded three more times before the end of the war, earning a total of four Purple Hearts.

In 1945, Hawk returned from the war and then attended the University of Washington, graduating with a bachelor's degree in biology. For more than thirty years he worked as a teacher and principal in the Central Kitsap School District.

On April 5, 2008, Hawk received the Medal of Honor flag in the Capitol rotunda in Olympia, Washington. He was presented the flag by Brigadier General Gordon Toney, commander of the Washington Army National Guard. Hawk said of his Medal of Honor:

What I did was not such a big thing. I never did anything more than the people I served with. The [Medal of Honor] is a symbol and it stands for service, everybody's service. I did it for the people who were there and they were doing the same thing for me.

Hawk was a compatriot of the Washington State Society of the Sons of the American Revolution.

Sergeant Hawk died on November 4, 2013, at the age of 89. Jackson Park Elementary in Bremerton was renamed John D. "Bud" Hawk Elementary in his honor.

== Medal of Honor citation ==
Sergeant Hawk's official Medal of Honor citation reads:

He manned a light machinegun on 20 August 1944, near Chambois, France, a key point in the encirclement which created the Falaise Pocket. During an enemy counterattack, his position was menaced by a strong force of tanks and infantry. His fire forced the infantry to withdraw, but an artillery shell knocked out his gun and wounded him in the right thigh. Securing a bazooka, he and another man stalked the tanks and forced them to retire to a wooded section. In the lull which followed, Sgt. Hawk reorganized 2 machinegun squads and, in the face of intense enemy fire, directed the assembly of 1 workable weapon from 2 damaged guns. When another enemy assault developed, he was forced to pull back from the pressure of spearheading armor. Two of our tank destroyers were brought up. Their shots were ineffective because of the terrain until Sgt. Hawk, despite his wound, boldly climbed to an exposed position on a knoll where, unmoved by fusillades from the enemy, he became a human aiming stake for the destroyers. Realizing that his shouted fire directions could not be heard above the noise of battle, he ran back to the destroyers through a concentration of bullets and shrapnel to correct the range. He returned to his exposed position, repeating this performance until 2 of the tanks were knocked out and a third driven off. Still at great risk, he continued to direct the destroyers' fire into the Germans' wooded position until the enemy came out and surrendered. Sgt. Hawk's fearless initiative and heroic conduct, even while suffering from a painful wound, was in large measure responsible for crushing 2 desperate attempts of the enemy to escape from the Falaise Pocket and for taking more than 500 prisoners.

== Awards and decorations ==

Badge	Combat Infantryman Badge		
1st row	Medal of Honor		
2nd row	Bronze Star Medal	Purple Heart with three oak leaf clusters	Army Good Conduct Medal
3rd row	American Campaign Medal	European–African–Middle Eastern Campaign Medal with 1 campaign star	World War II Victory Medal

== University of Washington Medal of Honor Memorial ==
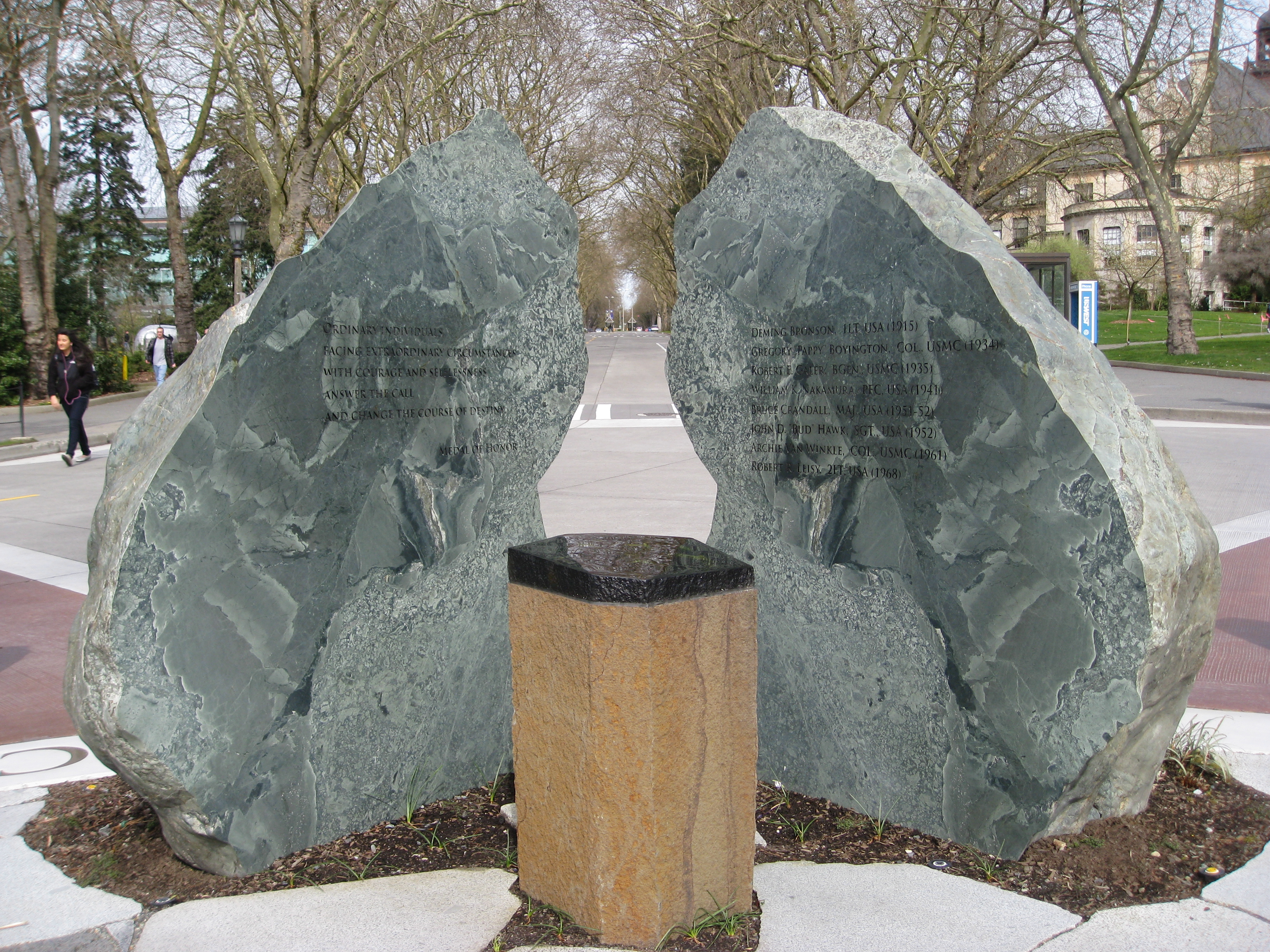
Medal of Honor memorial at the University of Washington

At the University of Washington (UW) in February 2006, a resolution recommending a memorial be erected to honor fighter ace and alumnus Pappy Boyington for his service during World War II was raised and defeated during a meeting of the student senate. Some people did not believe the resolution's sponsor had fully addressed the financial and logistical problems of installing a memorial, and some were questioning the widely held assumption that all warriors and acts of war are automatically worthy of memorialization. The story was picked up by some blogs and conservative news outlets, focusing on two statements made by student senators during the meeting. One student senator, Ashley Miller, said that the UW already had many monuments to "rich, white men" (Boyington claimed partial Sioux ancestry and was not rich); another, Jill Edwards, questioned whether the UW should memorialize a person who killed others, summarized in the minutes as saying "she didn't believe a member of the Marine Corps was an example of the sort of person UW wanted to produce." After its defeat, a new version of the original resolution was submitted that called for a memorial to all eight UW alumni who received the Medal of Honor after attending the UW. On April 4, 2006, the resolution passed by a vote of 64 to 14 with several abstentions, on a roll call vote. The University of Washington Medal of Honor memorial was constructed at the south end of Memorial Way (17th Ave NE), north of Red Square, in the interior of a traffic circle between Parrington and Kane Halls (47.6573°N 122.3097°W). Privately funded, it was completed in time for a Veterans Day dedication in November 2009. In addition to Greg Boyington, it honors Deming Bronson, Bruce Crandall, Robert Galer, John Hawk, Robert Leisy, William Nakamura, and Archie Van Winkle.

Ordinary individuals
facing extraordinary circumstances
with courage and selflessness
answer the call
and change the course of destiny.
Medal of Honor

== See also ==
- List of Medal of Honor recipients for World War II
