= Operation Toan Thang IV =

Part of the Vietnam War (1969–1970)

- Part of Vietnam War
Date	1 November 1969 – 1 May 1970
Location	III Corps, South Vietnam
Result	Allied operational success

Belligerents
United States; South Vietnam	(Provisional Revolutionary Government of the Republic of South Vietnam) Viet Cong; North Vietnam

Commanders and leaders
(United States) LTG Julian Ewell (South Vietnam) LTG Đỗ Cao Trí	

Units involved
(United States) 1st Infantry Division; 9th Infantry Division; 25th Infantry Division; 1st Cavalry Division; 11th Armored Cavalry Regiment; 199th Light Infantry Brigade; 12th Combat Aviation Group; River Patrol Force (TF-116) (South Vietnam) 5th Division; 18th Division; 25th Division; Airborne Division	1st Division; 5th Division; 7th Division; 9th Division

Casualties and losses
(United States) 685 killed	U.S body count: 14,479 killed 5,406 individual and 586 crew-served weapons recovered

Operation Toan Thang IV ("Complete Victory") was a U.S. Army and Army of the Republic of Vietnam (ARVN) operation conducted between 1 November 1969 and 1 May 1970 in the Vietnam War. The operation was designed to keep pressure on Vietcong (VC) and People's Army of Vietnam (PAVN) forces in III Corps.

== Background ==
The operation was a continuation of Operation Toan Thang III in the same operational area and with largely the same forces.

== Operation ==
=== November ===
On 19 November a unit of the 3rd Brigade, 9th Infantry Division operating 21 km northwest of Tân An found a munitions cache containing 72 RPG-2 grenades, 106 hand grenades and 5,000 rounds of small arms ammunition. On 21 November a unit of the 1st Cavalry Division (Airmobile) operating near Phước Bình District found a weapons cache containing 39 rifles and four machine guns. On 29 November helicopters from the 2nd Brigade, 1st Cavalry Division and tactical airstrikes kill 69 PAVN/VC.

=== December ===
On 1 December at 18:50, Rangers from the 3rd Brigade, 9th Infantry Division, engaged 20 PAVN/VC 4 miles (6.4 km) south of Tân An, killing five and capturing one.

On 2 December at 04:00, a unit of the 11th Armored Cavalry Regiment (11th ACR) engaged an enemy force approaching its night defensive position 2 miles (3.2 km) southwest of Bù Đốp District. The enemy withdrew after five minutes, leaving seven dead; U.S. losses were two killed. At 09:30 mechanized infantry of the 1st Brigade, 25th Infantry Division, investigating an artillery strike 12 miles (19 km) east of Tây Ninh found 17 PAVN/VC dead. At 14:50 a unit of the 3rd Brigade, 1st Cavalry Division engaged an enemy force 10 miles (16 km) northwest of Phước Bình supported by artillery, helicopter gunships and AC-47 and AC-119 gunships. The enemy withdrew at 19:00, leaving 17 dead; U.S. losses were four killed, including Second Lieutenant Robert Ronald Leisy, who shielded a fellow soldier from the blast of a Rocket-propelled grenade (RPG), an action for which he was posthumously awarded the Medal of Honor. At 19:15 a unit of the 2nd Brigade, 25th Infantry Division patrolling 8 miles (13 km) northeast of Go Dau Ha engaged an enemy unit in a 25-minute firefight. The enemy withdrew, leaving nine dead and six AK-47s.

On 3 December in the early morning there were attacks by fire on Dầu Tiếng Base Camp, Tây Ninh Combat Base and Quản Lợi Base Camp causing minimal damage. At 14:45 a unit of the 3rd Brigade, 1st Cavalry Division, engaged an enemy force 2 miles (3.2 km) southwest of Bù Đốp, killing five and capturing two AK-47s. At 18:20 helicopter gunships from the 1st Squadron, 9th Cavalry Regiment (1/9th Cavalry) attacked an enemy force 17 miles (27 km) northwest of Phước Bình, killing 22. At 18:25 a light observation helicopter from the 3rd Brigade, 9th Infantry Division, received fire 10 miles (16 km) east-southeast of Tân An, Brigade infantry moved to the area and killed five PAVN/VC in a brief skirmish. An OH-6 Cayuse light observation helicopter was shot down 12 miles (19 km) northwest of Mộc Hóa District.

On 4 December in the early morning, there were attacks by fire on Tây Ninh Combat Base and Sông Bé Base Camp causing minimal damage, at Sông Bé helicopter gunships of the 2nd Brigade, 1st Cavalry Division, attacked the firing positions causing two secondary explosions. At 13:00 a unit of the 1st Brigade, 25th Infantry Division, was air-assaulted into the location of an airstrike 16 miles (26 km) west of Tây Ninh where they found ten PAVN/VC dead and three SKS rifles and base camp with a 4-ton rice cache and seventy-three 60 mm mortar rounds. On 5 December, in the early morning, an attack by fire hit Tây Ninh Combat Base, causing minimal damage. At 00:30 helicopter gunships from the 1st Cavalry Division received fire 25 miles (40 km) northeast of Tây Ninh and attacked the firing position, 15 PAVN/VC dead were seen in the area. At 11:00 a unit of the 3rd Brigade, 1st Cavalry Division, engaged an enemy force 15 miles (24 km) west of Phước Bình, the enemy withdrew after 30 minutes, leaving seven dead; U.S. losses were two killed. Also at 11:00 a unit of the 199th Light Infantry Brigade (199th LIB) engaged an enemy platoon 22 miles (35 km) southeast of Biên Hòa, the enemy withdrew after 30 minutes with unknown losses; U.S. losses were two killed. At 16:30 the 1/9th Cavalry supported by artillery and helicopter gunships engaged an enemy unit 18 miles (29 km) northeast of Tây Ninh, the enemy withdrew at 19:00, leaving 20 dead.

On 6 December, in the early morning, Quản Lợi Base Camp was attacked by fire causing minimal damage. At 09:15 a unit of the 1st Brigade, 1st Cavalry Division and Civilian Irregular Defense Group program (CIDG) troops engaged an enemy force 28 miles (45 km) northeast of Tây Ninh supported by artillery, helicopter gunships and airstrikes. The enemy withdrew after 20 minutes, leaving 45 dead and 12 individual weapons, one 60 mm mortar and a 12.7mm machine gun. At 11:00 6 miles (9.7 km) south of the earlier contact another unit of the 1st Brigade engaged an enemy force, the action continued until 16:00 when the enemy withdrew, leaving eight dead and seven individual weapons; U.S. losses were one killed. At 13:00 a unit of the 199th LIB operating 13 miles (21 km) northwest of Xuân Lộc District found the bodies of ten PAVN/VC killed earlier by airstrikes.

On 7 December at 01:50, a UH-1 Iroquois from the 1st Cavalry Division received fire 30 miles (48 km) north of Tây Ninh, the helicopter engaged the enemy and called in artillery and airstrikes and ten PAVN/VC dead were seen in the strike area. At 12:10 a unit from the 3rd Brigade, 1st Cavalry Division, was attacked 6 miles (9.7 km) northeast of Lộc Ninh District, the unit returned fire and the enemy withdrew immediately, leaving five dead, one individual weapon and one RPG launcher; U.S. losses were one killed. At 15:25 a unit of the 1st Brigade, 1st Cavalry Division, engaged 25–30 PAVN/VC 12 miles (19 km) southeast of Katum Camp supported by artillery, helicopter gunships and airstrikes. The enemy withdrew at 15:40, leaving 19 dead and one .30 cal machine gun. At 15:45 helicopters from the 1/9th Cavalry attacked an enemy force 4 miles (6.4 km) northeast of Bù Đốp, killing nine. At 17:15 1/9th Cavalry helicopters received 12.7mm fire from the same area and attacked the position, killing 13 PAVN/VC. At 17:30 a unit of the 3rd Brigade, 1st Cavalry Division, was attacked 8 miles (13 km) west-northwest of Phước Bình, the unit returned fire supported by artillery and airstrikes and the enemy withdrew after 20 minutes, leaving six dead and one individual weapon. At 17:40 a unit of the 3rd Brigade, 1st Cavalry Division, engaged an enemy force 9 miles (14 km) southwest of Bù Đốp; the enemy withdrew after 45 minutes with unknown losses; U.S. losses were one killed.

On 8 December in the early morning attacks by fire were made on most base camps in the operational area causing minimal damage. At 08:20 a unit of the 1st Brigade, 1st Cavalry Division, engaged an enemy force 9 miles (14 km) southeast of Katum, the enemy withdrew after two hours, leaving 23 dead and three crew-served weapons. At 18:20 helicopter gunships from the 1/9th Cavalry attacked an enemy force 22 miles (35 km) north of Tây Ninh, killing ten. On 9 December at 09:10, a unit of the 3rd Brigade, 1st Cavalry Division, engaged an enemy squad 8 miles (13 km) northwest of Phước Bình, the enemy withdrew at 15:00, leaving eight dead; U.S. losses were one killed. At 09:40 a unit of the 3rd Brigade, 1st Cavalry Division, patrolling 15 miles (24 km) west-northwest of Phước Bình engaged an enemy force, the enemy withdrew after 30 minutes, leaving 13 dead. At 13:00 a unit of the armored cavalry squadron of the 25th Infantry Division was attacked 8 miles northeast of Trảng Bàng District, the unit returned fire supported by artillery, helicopter gunships and airstrikes. The enemy withdrew at 18:00, leaving 13 dead. At 16:00 Rangers and a reconnaissance unit of the 199th LIB found a weapons cache 20 miles (32 km) northeast of Xuân Lộc containing 12 RPG-7 launchers, 40 RPG-2 grenades and 136 82 mm mortar rounds.

On 10 December at 00:15, a unit of the 1st Brigade, 25th Infantry Division, observed enemy forces near their night defensive position 13 miles (21 km) northwest of Tây Ninh and engaged them with small arms and artillery fire. A sweep of the area at dawn found six PAVN/VC dead, three RPG launchers, two AK-47s and a radio. At 13:10 a unit of the 3rd Brigade, 1st Cavalry Division, engaged an enemy squad 12 miles (19 km) northeast of Lộc Ninh, the enemy withdrew after 30 minutes, leaving two dead. At the same time 9 miles (14 km) northwest of Phước Bình a unit of the 3rd Brigade, 1st Cavalry Division, found 11 PAVN/VC dead and five individual and one crew-served weapons, all had been killed by artillery fire in the previous 12 hours. At 17:25 helicopter gunships from the 1/9th Cavalry attacked six PAVN/VC 4 miles (6.4 km) northeast of Bù Đốp, killing all six. At 19:30 a unit of the 2nd Brigade, 25th Infantry Division, was attacked 10 miles (16 km) southwest of Lai Khê, the unit returned fire supported by artillery and helicopter gunships and the enemy withdrew after an hour, leaving six dead.

On 11 December at 00:05, a unit of the 3rd Brigade, 25th Infantry Division, was attacked 2 miles (3.2 km) north of Hiệp Hòa, the unit returned fire supported by artillery and helicopter gunships and the enemy withdrew. At 10:30 a unit of the 1st Cavalry Division engaged an enemy force 9 miles (14 km) northeast of Phước Bình, killing 36. At 13:10 a unit of the 1st Brigade, 1st Cavalry Division, found nine PAVN/VC dead 18 miles (29 km) northeast of Tây Ninh all had been killed by airstrikes. At 15:30 an armored unit of the 25th Infantry Division found 16 PAVN/VC dead 8 miles (13 km) northeast of Tây Ninh all had been killed by small arms and airstrikes in the previous two days. At 16:00 a unit of the 199th LIB engaged an enemy force 22 miles (35 km) southeast of Biên Hòa, the enemy withdrew after 20 minutes, leaving three dead; U.S. losses were one killed. At 21:10 helicopter gunships of the 1st Cavalry Division received fire 10 miles (16 km) northeast of Phước Bình and engaged the firing position supported by artillery, 11 PAVN/VC dead were seen in the strike area.

On 12 December between 01:50 and 03:10 helicopter gunships of the 1st Cavalry Division received fire 10 miles (16 km) northeast of Phước Bình and attacked the firing position supported by an AC-47 gunship and 11 PAVN/VC dead were seen in the strike area. At 02:00 helicopter gunships of the 1st Cavalry Division attacked an enemy force 8 miles (13 km) southeast of Katum, killing five. At 07:45 a Ranger unit from the 3rd Brigade, 9th Infantry Division, engaged an enemy force 4 miles (6.4 km) south-southeast of Tân An. The unit was supported by artillery and helicopter gunships and the fighting continued until 18:05 when the enemy withdrew, leaving 20 dead and one captured and five individual weapons; U.S. losses were on killed. At 15:05 a unit of the 3rd Brigade, 1st Infantry Division operating 10 miles west of Chơn Thành District engaged an enemy force. The enemy withdrew at 17:45, leaving eight dead and three individual weapons. At 15:10 a unit of the 3rd Brigade, 25th Infantry Division, was air-assaulted into an area 2 miles (3.2 km) northwest of Hiệp Hòa and were immediately engaged by an enemy force. The unit returned fire supported by artillery and helicopter gunships and the enemy withdrew at 20:30, leaving five dead and one individual and one crew-served weapon; U.S. losses were one killed. At 16:00 helicopter gunships from the 1/9th Cavalry received fire 14 miles (23 km) northeast of Phước Bình and attacked the firing position supported by artillery fire, killing 11 PAVN/VC. At 17:55 helicopter gunships of the 1/9th Cavalry killed five PAVN/VC 17 miles (27 km) east of Phước Bình. At 19:10 a unit of the 3rd Brigade patrolling 4 miles north of Hiệp Hòa was attacked, the unit returned fire and the enemy withdrew after two hours; U.S. losses were one killed. At 20:00 another Brigade patrol was attacked in the same area, the unit returned fire supported by artillery and helicopter gunships and the enemy withdrew after 45 minutes; U.S. losses were four killed.

On 13 December at 00:30, helicopter gunships of the 1st Cavalry Division received fire 14 miles (23 km) northeast of Phước Bình and attacked the firing positions, killing 12 PAVN/VC. At 11:30 a unit of the armored cavalry squadron of the 25th infantry Division operating 10 miles (16 km) northeast of Go Dau Ha found ten PAVN/VC dead all killed by airstrikes in the previous two days. At 17:40 helicopter gunships of the 12th Combat Aviation Group attacked an enemy force 10 miles (16 km) northeast of Biên Hòa, killing five. At 18:15 helicopter gunships of the 1/9th Cavalry attacked an enemy force 18 miles (29 km) north of Tây Ninh, killing five. At 22:50 helicopter gunships of the 1st Cavalry Division supported by artillery attacked an enemy force 13 miles (21 km) northeast of Phước Bình, killing six.

On 14 December at 05:10, a unit of the armored cavalry squadron of the 25th Infantry Division operating 2 miles (3.2 km) north-northeast of Trảng Bàng engaged seven PAVN/VC, killing five and capturing one individual weapon. At 10:45 a unit of the 2nd Brigade, 25th Infantry Division, patrolling 8 miles (13 km) west of Lai Khê engaged an enemy bunker complex, killing nine PAVN/VC and capturing one. At 11:30 a unit of the 3rd Brigade, 1st Cavalry Division, operating 9 miles (14 km) southwest of Phước Bình engaged ten PAVN/VC, killing seven and capturing one individual weapon. At 11:35 an armored unit of the 25th Infantry Division found a munitions cache 6 miles (9.7 km) northeast of Tây Ninh, as they were investigating the cache the unit was attacked and returned fire supported by artillery, helicopter gunships and airstrikes. The enemy withdrew at 12:50, leaving ten dead. At 13:00 a unit of the 3rd Brigade, 9th Infantry Division, engaged an enemy force 12 miles (19 km) east of Tân An. The unit was supported by artillery, helicopter gunships and airstrikes and reinforced by a Regional Force (RF) unit. The enemy withdrew at 16:45, leaving 19 dead and seven individual and one crew-served weapon; U.S. losses were one killed. At 14:10 a unit of the 3rd Brigade, 1st Cavalry Division, found a weapons cache 9 miles northwest of Sông Bé containing 50 submachineguns, three AK-47s, five SKS, one RPG-2 launcher, 86,000 rounds of small arms ammunition, 269 RPG-2 grenades and 67 RPG-7 grenades. At 19:00 a Ranger unit of the 3rd Brigade, 9th Infantry Division, engaged six PAVN/VC 6 miles northwest of Tân An, killing five. An OH-6 was shot down 19 miles (31 km) east-southeast of Saigon.

On 15 December at 08:20, a unit of the 11th ACR and the ARVN 9th Regiment, 5th Division engaged an enemy company 2 miles (3.2 km) southeast of Bù Đốp, another 11 ACR unit reinforced and artillery, helicopter gunship and air support was provided. The enemy withdrew at 09:30, leaving 51 dead and 15 individual and seven crew-served weapons; U.S. losses were four killed. At 13:00 an armored unit of the 25th Infantry Division was attacked 8 miles (13 km) northeast of Tây Ninh, the unit returned fire and the enemy withdrew after 30 minutes, leaving 15 dead. At 15:45 helicopter gunships from the 1/9th Cavalry attacked an enemy force 25 miles (40 km) southeast of Phước Bình. The aerorifle platoon was landed in the area and found 11 PAVN/VC dead and captured three.

On 16 December at 13:30, a Chieu hoi led mechanized infantry of the 1st Brigade, 1st Infantry Division, to a munitions cache 11 miles (18 km) west of Lai Khê containing 170 RPG-2 grenades. An OH-6 was shot down 12 miles (19 km) southeast of Phước Bình. On 17 December at 00:45, a 122 mm rocket hit Saigon destroying a house. At 01:55 a mechanized infantry unit of the 1st Brigade, 1st Infantry Division, in a night defensive position 6 miles (9.7 km) southeast of Dầu Tiếng was attacked, the unit returned fire supported by artillery and helicopter gunships and the enemy withdrew at 02:50. At 08:50 a unit of the 3rd Brigade, 25th Infantry Division, engaged an enemy force 1 mile (1.6 km) north-northwest of Bến Tre, the enemy immediately withdrew, leaving five dead and two individual weapons; U.S. losses were one killed. At 13:05 a unit of the 1st Brigade, 1st Cavalry Division, engaged an enemy force 18 miles (29 km) northeast of Tây Ninh, the enemy withdrew after 15 minutes, leaving 17 dead. At 17:00 helicopter gunships of the 1st Cavalry Division engaged an enemy force 20 miles (32 km) northeast of Tây Ninh, killing 15. At 23:30 helicopters from the 2nd Brigade, 1st Cavalry Division, received fire 28 miles (45 km) southeast of Phước Bình and returned fire, killing eight. An AH-1 Cobra was shot down 4 miles (6.4 km) south of Lai Khê.

On 18 December at 00:30, a rocket attack on Tây Ninh Combat Base killed a Kit Carson Scout. At 07:50 a unit of the 199th LIB was ambushed 9 miles (14 km) west of Xuân Lộc, the enemy withdrew after five minutes, leaving two dead and two individual weapons; U.S. losses were one killed. At 12:30 helicopter gunships from the 1st Cavalry Division received fire 9 miles (14 km) southeast of Katum, the gunships returned fire and called in artillery fire, killing five PAVN/VC. At 14:50 a mechanized infantry unit from the 1st Brigade, 25th Infantry Division, was attacked 9 miles northeast of Go Dau Ha. The unit returned fire supported by artillery, helicopter gunships and airstrikes. The enemy withdrew at 17:30, leaving 14 dead; U.S. losses were two killed. On 19 December at 02:30, five 122 mm rockets hit Tan Son Nhut Air Base causing minimal damage. At 09:30 a unit of the 3rd Brigade, 1st Cavalry Division, engaged an enemy force 7 miles (11 km) southwest of Bù Đốp, the enemy withdrew after 15 minutes, leaving 14 dead; U.S. losses were one killed.

On 20 December at 11:00, helicopter gunships from the 1/9th Cavalry received fire 12 miles (19 km) southeast of Phước Bình and returned fire and directed artillery and airstrikes onto the area. Nine PAVN/VC dead were seen among 15 destroyed bunkers in the strike area. At 14:10 1 mile (1.6 km) southeast, helicopters saw five PAVN/VC dead and attacked another two PAVN/VC, killing both of them. On 21 December at 08:30, an aerial observer from the 23rd Artillery Group directed fire onto an enemy force 3 miles (4.8 km) north-northwest of Quản Lợi, killing 15 PAVN/VC. At 11:40 a unit of the 3rd Brigade, 1st Cavalry Division, operating 11 miles (18 km) southwest of Sông Bé engaged six PAVN/VC, killing five and capturing one pistol. At 19:55 a unit of the 199th LIB engaged an enemy force 23 miles (37 km) north-northeast of Xuân Lộc. The unit was supported by artillery and an AC-119 gunship, the enemy withdrew at 21:30, leaving seven dead and four individual weapons. At 21:55 a unit of the 3rd Brigade, 9th Infantry Division, engaged an enemy platoon 7 miles (11 km) east-southeast of Tân An, the unit was supported by artillery, helicopter gunships and AC-119 fire. The enemy withdrew after two hours, leaving five dead. An OH-6 was shot down 20 miles (32 km) northwest of Tây Ninh.

On 22 December at 15:45, a unit of the 199th LIB engaged an enemy company 15 miles (24 km) east-northeast of Biên Hòa, the enemy withdrew after 25 minutes, leaving two dead. At 17:00 helicopter gunships of the 1/9th Cavalry killed seven PAVN/VC 9 miles (14 km) northeast of Đức Phong. At 21:30 RPGs hit the night defensive position of the armored cavalry squadron of the 25th Infantry Division 18 miles (29 km) east-southeast of Tây Ninh, the unit returned fire supported by artillery and helicopter gunships and the enemy withdrew. An AH-1 was shot down 4 miles (6.4 km) east-northeast of Bù Đốp, killing both crewmen. On 23 December at 12:25, helicopter gunships of the 2nd Brigade, 25th Infantry Division, killed five PAVN/VC 10 miles (16 km) southeast of Trảng Bàng. At 19:30 a reconnaissance unit of the 3rd Brigade, 9th Infantry Division, was attacked 2 miles (3.2 km) south-southeast of Bến Lức District, the unit returned fire supported by artillery, helicopter gunships and an AC-119. The enemy withdrew at 23:00, leaving ten dead.

On 24 December at 07:45, a unit of the 11th ACR supported by airstrikes engaged an enemy company 11 miles (18 km) southwest of Lộc Ninh, killing 30 PAVN/VC and destroying 14 bunkers. At 08:00 a unit of the 2nd Brigade, 25th Infantry Division, and RF forces triggered a command-detonated mine 7 miles (11 km) east of Trảng Bàng, killing four U.S. soldiers, two suspected VC were captured in the area. Operations were suspended for a Christmas ceasefire from 18:00 on 24 December to 18:00 on 25 December. At 20:20 an 11th ACR night defensive position 4 miles (6.4 km) south-southwest of An Lộc was attacked by fire, the unit returned fire supported by artillery and helicopter gunships and the enemy withdrew. At 21:10 a unit of the 2nd Brigade, 25th Infantry Division, observed four PAVN/VC approaching their night defensive position 2 miles (3.2 km) east of Trảng Bàng and fired on them, killing three and capturing one individual weapon. On 25 December at 09:05 a unit of the 2nd Brigade, 1st Infantry Division, in a night defensive position 11 miles (18 km) northeast of Bến Cát fired on a PAVN/VC soldier approaching their position, killing him and capturing his weapon. At midday a unit of the 1st Brigade, 25th Infantry Division, observed five PAVN/VC setting up a command-detonated mine 8 miles (13 km) north of Tây Ninh and fired on them, killing two and capturing one individual weapon. At 12:30 a reconnaissance helicopter of the 1st Cavalry Division received fire 9 miles (14 km) southeast of Katum and returned fire, killing two PAVN/VC. At 13:00 a reconnaissance helicopter of the 1st Cavalry Division received fire 15 miles (24 km) northeast of Phước Bình and returned fire, killing one PAVN/VC. At 15:55 a unit of the 3rd Brigade, 1st Cavalry Division, was attacked by an enemy squad 10 miles (16 km) south of Bù Đốp, the unit returned fire supported by helicopter gunships and the enemy withdrew after 15 minutes, leaving four dead. At 23:30 a unit of the 1st Brigade, 25th Infantry Division, engaged 11 PAVN/VC 13 miles (21 km) north of Tây Ninh, the enemy withdrew after 35 minutes, leaving six dead.

On 27 December at 07:20, helicopter gunships from the air cavalry squadron of the 11th ACR engaged two PAVN companies 9 miles (14 km) northwest of Lộc Ninh. At 12:45 ground units of the Regiment and RF forces swept the area and engaged the PAVN supported by artillery, helicopter gunships and airstrikes. The PAVN withdrew at 13:10, leaving 79 dead among 40 destroyed bunkers; U.S. losses were one killed. The PAVN were identified as coming from the 7th Division. At 07:25 a mechanized infantry unit of the 3rd Brigade, 9th Infantry Division, found eight PAVN/VC dead 7 miles (11 km) southeast of Tân An, all had been killed by airstrikes earlier that day. At 13:30 a unit of the 2nd Brigade, 25th Infantry Division, was led to a munitions cache 4 miles (6.4 km) east of Trảng Bàng by a Chieu Hoi, the cache contained 30 107 mm rockets and 4,000 rounds of 12.7mm ammunition. At 24:00 helicopters from the 12th Combat Aviation Group engaged an enemy force 14 miles (23 km) south-southeast of An Lộc, killing six.

On 28 December at 00:45, a unit of the 2nd Brigade, 25th Infantry Division, in a night defensive position 12 miles (19 km) west-southwest of Lai Khê was attacked by fire. The unit returned fire and was supported by artillery, helicopter gunships, airstrikes and AC-119 fire. The enemy withdrew after ten minutes, leaving three dead and two AK-47s; U.S. losses were seven killed. At 09:55 a unit of the 199th LIB was attacked 15 miles (24 km) southwest of Xuân Lộc, the unit returned fire and was supported by artillery, helicopter gunships and airstrikes. The enemy withdrew after two hours, leaving three dead. At 13:10 an OH-6 from the 1/9th Cavalry received fire 8 miles (13 km) north-northeast of Phước Bình and returned fire and directed airstrikes onto the location and the bodies of five PAVN/VC were seen in the strike area. At 17:20, 600 m to the northeast, another helicopter received fire and engaged the firing position and directed artillery and airstrikes onto the location following this 41 PAVN/VC dead were seen in the strike area.

On 29 December at 06:55, a unit of the 1st Brigade, 1st Infantry Division, ambushed 12 PAVN/VC 19 miles (31 km) southwest of An Lộc, killing all 12 and capturing four individual weapons. At 15:30 an aerial observer from the 1st Cavalry Division directed artillery fire onto an enemy force 1 mile (1.6 km) south-southwest of Phước Bình, killing five PAVN/VC. At 19:15 a United States Navy Patrol Boat, River (PBR) operating on the Saigon River 8 miles (13 km) south of Bến Cát attacked a PAVN/VC force crossing the river supported by helicopter gunships, killing 27 PAVN/VC and capturing one.

On 30 December at 01:45, a unit of the 2nd Brigade, 25th Infantry Division, and ARVN forces engaged 20 PAVN/VC 5 miles (8.0 km) north-northwest of Củ Chi Base Camp killing seven. At 11:55 helicopter gunships from the 1st Brigade, 1st Cavalry Division, received fire 11 miles (18 km) south-southeast of Katum and returned fire supported by artillery and airstrikes, eight PAVN/VC were killed in the strike area; U.S. losses were one crewman killed. At 12:25 a mechanized infantry unit from the 3rd Brigade, 25th Infantry Division, and RF troops were attacked 4 miles (6.4 km) southwest of Trảng Bàng, the unit returned fire and the battle continued until the enemy withdrew at 17:40, leaving 22 dead and one AK-47 and one light machine gun. At 15:15 an OH-6 from the 1/9th Cavalry received fire 22 miles (35 km) east of Phước Bình and returned fire and directed artillery and airstrikes onto the position. The OH-6 was hit and forced to land nearby and the aerorifle position was landed to protect the crew. The enemy withdrew at 18:00, leaving 29 dead among 19 destroyed bunkers. At 16:15 an OH-6 from the 1/9th Cavalry attacked six PAVN/VC 4 miles north-northeast of Phước Bình and a second OH-6 joined the skirmish and was shot down. The aerorifle platoon was landed at the crash site and engaged the enemy supported by artillery and airstrikes. The enemy withdrew at 17:15, leaving 24 dead and three 12.7mm machine guns; U.S. losses were one killed. At 16:30 a unit of the 3rd Brigade, 9th Infantry Division, supported by helicopter gunships engaged an enemy force 6 miles (9.7 km) southeast of Tân An, killing seven. At 18:30 another unit of the Brigade engaged five PAVN/VC 5 miles northeast of Tân An, killing all five. At 21:35 helicopter gunships from the 12th Combat Aviation Group engaged an enemy force 8 miles (13 km) northeast of Dầu Tiếng, killing 12.

On 31 December at 01:30, a unit of the 1st Brigade, 1st Infantry Division, ambushed eight PAVN/VC 6 miles (9.7 km) east of Dầu Tiếng, killing seven and capturing one and four AK-47s and two K-54 pistols. At 14:45 troops from the 1/9th Cavalry operating 6 miles northeast of Bến Cát captured two PAVN/VC and found one dead. At 16:30 a unit of the armored cavalry squadron of the 25th Infantry Division patrolling 9 miles (14 km) northeast of Go Dau Ha killed six PAVN/VC and captured four AK-47s and two RPG-2 launchers. At 17:35 helicopter gunships from the 1st Cavalry Division attacked 20 PAVN/VC 24 miles (39 km) north of Tây Ninh, killing 12. A New Year ceasefire began at 18:00 on 31 December and continued until 18:00 on 1 January. At 21:45 a U.S. Navy PBR engaged PAVN/VC crossing the Saigon River 6 miles southwest of Bến Cát, killing one. At 22:00 a unit of the 3rd Brigade, 9th Infantry Division, engaged three PAVNN/VC approaching their position 7 miles (11 km) southeast of Tân An, killing one. At 22:35 a unit of the 2nd Brigade, 25th Infantry Division, engaged an enemy force near their night defensive position 5 miles (8.0 km) northeast of Trảng Bàng, the enemy withdrew after ten minutes, leaving four dead and two individual weapons.

Cumulative operational results to the end of December were 5,493 PAVN/VC killed, 822 suspects detained and 1,839 individual and 246 crew-served weapons captured. U.S. losses were 206 killed.

=== January ===
On 1 January at 01:00, a helicopter received fire 8 miles (13 km) southwest of Bến Cát and returned fire, killing one PAVN/VC. At 02:45 a U.S. Navy PBR patrolling 3 miles (4.8 km) northeast of Thạnh Phú District was fired on by two sampans, the PBR returned fire and the enemy withdrew. At 06:00 a unit of the 3rd Brigade, 25th Infantry Division, in a night defensive position 3 miles southwest of Go Dau Ha killed a PAVN/VC soldier approaching their perimeter. At 08:00 a light observation helicopter received fire 6 miles (9.7 km) southwest of Katum, an AH-1 attacked the firing position and one dead PAVN/VC was seen in the strike area. At 08:45 a unit of the 1st Brigade, 1st Infantry Division, in a night defensive position 15 miles (24 km) southwest of An Lộc engaged 13 PAVN/VC approaching their position, the enemy withdrew, leaving 12 dead and five individual weapons. At 09:00 a unit of the 1st Cavalry Division in a night defensive position 12 miles (19 km) southwest of Bù Đốp engaged a PAVN/VC force approaching their position, killing three and capturing three weapons. At 12:35 a PAVN/VC soldier triggered a mine around the night defensive position of a unit of the 1st Brigade, 1st Infantry Division, 21 miles (34 km) north of An Lộc, the PAVN/VC was killed and his weapon captured. At 13:55 a Ranger unit in a night defensive position 38 miles (61 km) north-northwest of Xuân Lộc received fire, the unit returned fire and the enemy withdrew, leaving two dead and two individual weapons. At 16:45 a unit of the 3rd Brigade, 1st Cavalry Division, engaged three PAVN/VC approaching their position 6 miles southeast of Lộc Ninh, killing two and capturing two individual weapons. At 17:30 a unit of the 2nd Brigade, 25th Infantry Division, was attacked with grenades 3 miles east of Trảng Bàng, the unit returned fire and captured one PAVN/VC and one individual weapon. Also at 17:30 a mechanized infantry unit of the 1st Infantry Division in a position 19 miles (31 km) southwest of An Lộc received RPG fire, the unit returned fire supported by helicopter gunships and the enemy withdrew. At 19:50 a unit of the 1st Brigade, 25th Infantry Division, supported by artillery and helicopter gunships engaged 50–70 PAVN/VC 6 miles northwest of Go Dau Ha. The enemy withdrew at 00:15 on 2 January, leaving 16 dead. At 21:30 helicopters from the 1st Infantry Division attacked five PAVN/VC 16 miles (26 km) east-northeast of Tây Ninh, killing all five.

On 2 January at midday, a unit of the armored cavalry squadron of the 25th Infantry Division operating 10 miles (16 km) northeast of Go Dau Ha killed five PAVN/VC and captured one individual weapon and 67 60/82 mm mortar rounds. On 3 January at 15:00, helicopters from the 1/9th Cavalry attacked six PAVN/VC 16 miles (26 km) northeast of Phước Bình, killing five. At 22:50 a unit of the 3rd Brigade, 25th Infantry Division, engaged an enemy force 4 miles (6.4 km) southwest of Go Dau Ha supported by artillery, helicopter gunships and airstrikes. The enemy withdrew at 00:10 on 4 January, leaving five dead and four individual weapons.

On 5 January at 10:50, a Ranger unit supported by helicopter gunships engaged six PAVN/VC 8 miles (13 km) northwest of Dong Bo, killing all six and capturing three individual weapons. At 14:10 a unit of the 1st Brigade, 1st Cavalry Division, supported by artillery and helicopter gunships engaged an enemy force 7 miles (11 km) southeast of Katum. The enemy withdrew at 14:50; U.S. losses were one killed. At 15:50 600 m to the north another Brigade unit engaged an enemy force until the enemy withdrew after 40 minutes. At 16:40 a unit of the 199th LIB engaged an enemy platoon 6 miles (9.7 km) southeast of Xuân Lộc, the enemy withdrew after 20 minutes, leaving four dead, four individual weapons and a radio. At 20:00 a Ranger unit of the 3rd Brigade, 9th Infantry Division, supported by artillery and helicopter gunships engaged ten PAVN/VC 6 miles south of Bến Lức, killing nine. A UH-1 was shot down 7 miles south-southeast of Katum.

On 6 January at 08:20, a unit of the 1st Brigade, 1st Cavalry Division, supported by artillery, helicopter gunships and airstrikes engaged an enemy force 20 miles (32 km) north-northeast of Tây Ninh. Contact was lost at 10:30, but air cavalry forces pursued and reestablished contact which continued until the enemy withdrew at 16:15, leaving 87 dead and 29 individual and seven crew-served weapons; U.S. losses were one killed. At 16:00 a unit of the 3rd Brigade, 25th Infantry Division, engaged an enemy force 6 miles (9.7 km) southwest of Go Dau Ha, the enemy withdrew after 50 minutes, leaving 17 dead. On 7 January at 16:15, a unit of the 1st Brigade, 25th Infantry Division, killed eight PAVN/VC 4 miles (6.4 km) west of Phú Cường.

On 8 January at 07:50, infantry from the 1st Brigade, 25th Infantry Division, supported by armor, artillery, helicopter gunships and airstrikes engaged an enemy force 7 miles (11 km) northeast of Tây Ninh. The enemy withdrew at 18:30, leaving 62 dead and two individual weapons; U.S. losses were two killed, including Specialist Four Danny J. Petersen who was posthumously awarded the Medal of Honor for providing covering fire so other members of his unit could withdraw. At 10:45 mechanized infantry from the 3rd Brigade, 9th Infantry Division, found the bodies of 12 PAVN/VC 5 miles (8.0 km) south-southeast of Tân An, all had been killed by artillery fire 12 hours earlier. At 11:20 a unit of the 1st Brigade, 1st Cavalry Division, found 13 PAVN/VC dead and nine individual weapons 20 miles (32 km) north-northeast of Tây Ninh, all had been killed by airstrikes. At 17:35 a unit of the 1st Cavalry Division engaged ten PAVN/VC 1 mile (1.6 km) south of Phước Vĩnh, the enemy withdrew after several minutes; U.S. losses were one killed. A UH-1 was shot down in Tây Ninh. On 9 January at 10:00, a unit of the 1st Brigade, 25th Infantry Division, was attacked 7 miles north-northeast of Tây Ninh, the unit returned fire supported by artillery, helicopter gunships and airstrikes. The enemy withdrew at 18:00, leaving 47 dead. At 12:45 a unit of the 2nd Brigade, 25th Infantry Division, was attacked with grenades 11 miles (18 km) northwest of Bến Cát, the unit returned fire, killing one PAVN/VC and capturing two individual weapons. At 15:35 helicopter gunships of the 1st Cavalry Division attacked a bunker complex 12 miles (19 km) northeast of Đức Phong, killing seven PAVN/VC. At 16:25 a helicopter from the 1st Aviation Brigade received fire 1 mile northeast of Trảng Bàng and returned fire, killing five PAVN/VC.

On 10 January at 08:00, a unit of the 1st Brigade, 25th Infantry Division, was attacked 7 miles (11 km) northeast of Tây Ninh, the unit returned fire and was supported by artillery, helicopter gunships and airstrikes in a battle that continued all day until the enemy withdrew at 17:50, leaving 13 dead. At 10:30 a mechanized infantry unit of the 1st Brigade, 25th Infantry Division, found 56 PAVN/VC dead and three individual and two crew-served weapons 9 miles (14 km) southeast of Tây Ninh, all had apparently been killed in the previous day. At 11:15 a unit of the 1st Brigade, 1st Cavalry Division, and CIDG forces were attacked by an entrenched enemy force 10 miles (16 km) southeast of Katum. The unit returned fire and was supported by artillery, helicopter gunships and airstrikes which forced the enemy to withdraw after 15 minutes, leaving 41 dead and one individual and one crew-served weapon. At 17:40 800 m to the south the same units were attacked by the enemy, the unit returned fire and the enemy withdrew after 35 minutes, leaving 21 dead and one crew-served weapon. At 12:25 a unit of the 2nd Brigade, 1st Cavalry Division, engaged an enemy force 1 mile (1.6 km) south of Sông Bé, the enemy withdrew after 10 minutes, leaving six dead and two individual weapons. At 19:55 a mechanized infantry unit of the 3rd Brigade, 9th Infantry Division, engaged an enemy force 4 miles (6.4 km) south of Tân An, the enemy withdrew after 20 minutes, leaving seven dead and three individual weapons. A UH-1 was shot down 12 miles (19 km) north of Tây Ninh.

On 11 January at 13:10, a unit of the 1st Brigade, 1st Cavalry Division, was attacked 12 miles (19 km) southeast of Katum. The unit returned fire and the enemy withdrew after 10 minutes, leaving 15 dead and two machine guns. On 12 January at 08:30, helicopters from the 12th Combat Aviation Group engaged an enemy force 5 miles (8.0 km) southeast of Tân An. Rangers and infantry from the 3rd Brigade, 9th Infantry Division, were landed in the area and engaged the enemy forces. At 12:45 an OH-6 was shot down in the area. The enemy withdrew at 13:25, leaving 26 dead and one individual weapon; U.S. losses were one killed. At 10:10 infantry from the 3rd Brigade, 25th Infantry Division, found a munitions cache 10 miles (16 km) west-southwest of Củ Chi containing 84 RPG-2 grenades and 75 Bangalore torpedoes. At 20:15 troops from the 1/9th Cavalry engaged 10–12 PAVN/VC 7 miles (11 km) south of Đồng Xoài, the enemy withdrew after 15 minutes, leaving five dead.

On 13 January at 17:50, a Ranger unit engaged an enemy force 25 miles (40 km) north of Xuân Lộc, killing six and capturing four individual weapons. At 18:00 a Ranger unit from the 25th Infantry Division engaged six PAVN/VC 7 miles (11 km) north of Go Dau Ha, the unit was reinforced by mechanized infantry and the enemy withdrew after an hour, leaving four dead; U.S. losses were one killed. On 14 January at 07:30, a unit of the 1st Brigade, 1st Infantry Division, engaged an enemy force 11 miles (18 km) north-northeast of Dầu Tiếng, killing six and capturing three individual weapons. At 09:35 a unit of the 199th LIB was ambushed 5 miles (8.0 km) north-northeast of Xuân Lộc, the unit returned fire and was supported by artillery and helicopter gunships forcing the enemy to withdraw at 10:25. At 19:00 helicopters from the 1/9th Cavalry killed six PAVN/VC 6 miles (9.7 km) west-southwest of Katum.

On 15 January at 01:45, a firebase occupied by a unit of the 11th ACR and ARVN Airborne troops 24 miles (39 km) north of Tây Ninh was hit by 100 60/82 mm mortar rounds followed by a ground attack. The units returned fire supported by artillery and helicopter gunships. The enemy withdrew at 03:00, leaving 19 dead and six AK-47s, three RPG-2 launchers and one RPG-7 launcher; U.S. losses were one killed. At 18:10 helicopter gunships from the 1/9th Cavalry attacked 15-20 PAVN/VC 27 miles (43 km) north of Tây Ninh and called in artillery and airstrikes on the location, nine dead were seen in the strike area. At 19:45 a unit of the 2nd Brigade, 1st Cavalry Division, in a night defensive position 25 miles (40 km) east-northeast of Sông Bé was attacked by an enemy force, the unit returned fire and the enemy withdrew after ten minutes, leaving two dead.

On 16 January at 14:45, a unit of the 3rd Brigade, 1st Cavalry Division, engaged 15 PAVN/VC 16 miles (26 km) north of Phước Bình, killing seven. At 16:25 helicopter gunships of the 2nd Brigade, 25th Infantry Division, killed seven PAVN/VC 8 miles (13 km) east-northeast of Trảng Bàng. At 21:50 a unit of the 3rd Brigade, 25th Infantry Division, supported by artillery and helicopter gunships engaged an enemy force 8 miles north of Tân An, the enemy withdrew after 45 minutes, leaving seven dead. On 17 January at 08:00, a unit of the 2nd Brigade, 1st Cavalry Division, found 24 PAVN/VC dead and one machine gun and six individual weapons 25 miles (40 km) east-northeast of Sông Bé all killed in two overnight ambushes. At 14:25 helicopter gunships from the 1/9th Cavalry attacked an enemy force 24 miles (39 km) east of Sông Bé killing ten. An OH-6 was shot down 11 miles (18 km) south-southwest of An Lộc.

On 18 January at 11:15, a unit of the 3rd Brigade, 25th Infantry Division, engaged an enemy force 4 miles (6.4 km) northeast of Bến Tre, killing eight PAVN/VC and capturing a light machine gun and an 82 mm mortar sight. At 20:00 a unit of the 2nd Brigade, 25th Infantry Division, engaged ten PAVN/VC 4 miles north of Củ Chi, killing six and capturing one individual and one crew-served weapons. On 19 January at 11:20, a unit of the 3rd Brigade, 25th Infantry Division, found a munitions cache 18 miles (29 km) south-southeast of Tây Ninh containing 27,500 rounds of small-arms ammunition and 148 mortar rounds. At 14:15 a unit of the 11th ACR was hit by RPG fire 30 miles (48 km) northeast of Tây Ninh, the unit returned fire and the enemy withdrew. Also at 14:15 mechanized infantry from the 1st Brigade, 1st Infantry Division, found a munitions cache 9 miles (14 km) east of Lai Khê containing 51,000 rounds of 7.62×39mm, 1,350 rounds of 12.7mm, 165 RPG-7 grenades, 14 individual weapons, two light machine guns and an 82 mm mortar. At 15:25 helicopter gunships from the 1/9th Cavalry supported by artillery attacked 20-30 PAVN/VC 6 miles (9.7 km) southeast of Đức Phong. At 17:10 the aerorifle platoon was landed in the area and they found 12 dead. An AH-1 was shot down 6 miles southeast of Phước Bình.

On 20 January at 10:00, a unit of the 1st Brigade, 1st Cavalry Division, found 21 PAVN/VC dead among 18 destroyed bunkers 12 miles (19 km) north of Tây Ninh, all had been killed the previous day. At 12:30 an OH-6 was shot down 2 miles (3.2 km) south of Bù Đốp, killing one crewman. A unit of the 11th ACR moved to the area and engaged an enemy force at 15:30 supported by artillery, helicopter gunships and airstrikes. The enemy withdrew at 16:45, leaving 27 dead. Also at 12:30 helicopter gunships from the 1/9th Cavalry received fire in Phước Long Province and engaged the firing position supported by artillery, killing 17 PAVN/VC. At 20:30 a mechanized infantry unit of the 1st Brigade, 1st Infantry Division, in a night defensive position 20 miles (32 km) south-southwest of An Lộc was attacked by fire, the unit returned fire supported by artillery, helicopter gunships and an AC-119. The enemy withdrew after 20 minutes; U.S. losses were one killed. At 23:50 helicopter gunships from the 1st Cavalry Division received fire 18 miles (29 km) northeast of Tây Ninh, the area was illuminated and 30 PAVN/VC were seen in the area, following gunship and artillery fire 20 dead were seen in the strike area.

On 21 January at 07:45, a unit of the 11th ACR engaged an enemy force 5 miles (8.0 km) north-northeast of Lộc Ninh. The unit was reinforced by other Regiment units and a unit from the 2nd Brigade, 1st Cavalry Division. The enemy withdrew at 16:00, leaving 35 dead and seven AK-47s, one 12.7mm machine gun, four RPG launchers, a 57 mm recoilless rifle and a 60 mm mortar. At 08:50 a box of 81 mm mortar ammunition exploded, killing 13 soldiers from the 199th LIB 20 miles (32 km) north-northeast of Xuân Lộc. At 10:30 helicopters from the 1st Brigade, 1st Cavalry Division, engaged an enemy force 20 miles (32 km) northeast of Tây Ninh and directed airstrikes on the position. The enemy withdrew, leaving eight dead and three 12.7mm machine guns among five destroyed bunkers. At 17:25 helicopter gunships from the 1/9th Cavalry engaged an enemy force 10 miles (16 km) southeast of Bù Đốp, killing six. At 18:00 helicopter gunships from the 1/9th Cavalry received fire 10 miles south of Katum, they returned fire and directed artillery and airstrikes onto the location and 15 dead and one destroyed crew-served weapon were seen in the strike area.

On 22 January at 11:55, a unit of the 1st Brigade, 1st Infantry Division, engaged an enemy force 25 miles (40 km) northeast of Tây Ninh supported by helicopter gunships and airstrikes. The enemy withdrew at 17:30, leaving eight dead and one AK-47; U.S. losses were one killed. At 12:15 a unit of the 3rd Brigade, 1st Infantry Division, received fire 15 miles (24 km) east-southeast of Lai Khê. At 19:50 a unit of the 2nd Brigade, 25th Infantry Division, engaged 10–12 PAVN/VC 9 miles (14 km) northwest of Củ Chi, the enemy withdrew after 50 minutes, leaving seven dead and two AK-47s. At 00:20 another element of the unit engaged six PAVN/VC 14 miles (23 km) northwest of Củ Chi, killing five and capturing four AK-47s. A UH-1 was shot down 9 miles (14 km) southeast of Katum. On 23 January at 03:45, a unit of the 11th ACR received fire 5 miles (8.0 km) southwest of Bù Đốp, the unit returned fire supported by artillery and helicopter gunships. The enemy withdrew after 20 minutes; U.S. losses were one killed and one Kit Carson Scout killed. At 17:15 a helicopter gunship from the 1/9th Cavalry received fire 7 miles (11 km) northeast of Tây Ninh, it returned fire and directed artillery and airstrikes onto the area and 12 PAVN/VC dead were seen in the strike area.

On 24 January at 14:20, a unit of the 1st Brigade, 25th infantry Division, supported by helicopter gunships engaged an enemy force 16 miles (26 km) west of Tây Ninh, the enemy withdrew after an hour, leaving 22 dead. On 25 January at 03:30, helicopter gunships from the 11th Aviation Group received fire 9 miles (14 km) southeast of Katum and returned fire, killing nine. At 12:30 a unit of the 2nd Brigade, 1st Cavalry Division, engaged an enemy platoon 9 miles east of Phước Bình, the enemy withdrew after 45 minutes, leaving ten dead; U.S. losses were two killed. At 23:30 a Ranger unit of the 1st Infantry Division engaged an enemy unit 10 miles (16 km) northeast of Lai Khê, the enemy withdrew after 15 minutes, leaving seven dead.

On 26 January at 10:40, a unit of the 199th LIB was attacked by fire 25 miles (40 km) east-northeast of Xuân Lộc, the unit returned fire supported by helicopter gunships and the enemy withdrew; U.S. losses were three killed. At 10:45 20 107/122 mm rockets hit Tây Ninh Combat Base, killing one Vietnamese civilian. At 11:50 a unit of the armored cavalry squadron of the 25th infantry Division found a weapons cache 9 miles (14 km) northeast of Go Dau Ha containing 64 individual weapons, four light machine guns, 250,000 rounds of small arms ammunition, 20 122 mm rockets, 42 107 mm rockets and 25 RPG-2 grenades. At 23:00 a 13 vehicle convoy was ambushed 3 miles (4.8 km) south of Thủ Đức District causing minimal damage. On 27 January at 11:00, a unit of the 3rd Brigade, 9th Infantry Division, found ten PAVN/VC dead and four individual weapons 10 miles (16 km) east of Tân An, all had been killed within the previous 24 hours. On 28 January at 13:25, a unit of the 199th LIB and RF forces engaged an enemy squad 7 miles (11 km) southeast of Xuân Lộc. The enemy withdrew after an hour, leaving seven dead and one AK-47. An AH-1 was shot down 17 miles (27 km) east-southeast of Phước Bình, killing both crewmen.

On 30 January at 11:00, a unit of the 1st Brigade, 25th Infantry Division, engaged an enemy force 14 miles (23 km) north-northwest of Tây Ninh, sporadic contact continued until 17:20 when the enemy withdrew; U.S. losses were one killed. At 16:20 a unit of the 2nd Brigade, 25th Infantry Division, received fire 1 mile (1.6 km) north-northeast of Trảng Bàng and the unit returned fire forcing the enemy to withdraw, leaving two dead and two individual and one crew-served weapons. On 31 January at 18:35, a unit of the 199th LIB in a night defensive position 25 miles (40 km) northeast of Xuân Lộc received mortar fire followed by a ground attack. The unit returned fire supported by helicopter gunships and an AC-119. The enemy withdrew after 45 minutes, leaving five dead; U.S. losses were two killed. At 19:25 a unit of the 199th LIB engaged six PAVN/VC 16 miles (26 km) east-northeast of Biên Hòa, the enemy withdrew after 20 minutes, leaving two dead.

Cumulative operational results to the end of January were 6,734 PAVN/VC killed and 2,145 individual and 277 crew-served weapons captured. U.S. losses were 261 killed.

=== February ===
On 1 February at 10:25, a helicopter from the 1/9th Cavalry received fire 4 miles (6.4 km) southwest of Bù Đốp and returned fire and directed artillery and airstrikes onto the firing location, eight PAVN/VC dead were seen in the strike area. At 10:50 a light observation helicopter from the 1/9th Cavalry received fire 21 miles (34 km) northeast of Tây Ninh and returned fire, killing 11 PAVN/VC. At 12:20 a unit of the 3rd Brigade, 1st Cavalry Division, received fire 6 miles (9.7 km) northeast of Lộc Ninh, the unit returned fire supported by artillery and helicopter gunships and the enemy withdrew after 10 minutes; U.S. losses were one killed. At 13:35 a helicopter from the 1/9th Cavalry received fire 3 miles (4.8 km) southwest of Bù Đốp and returned fire and directed artillery and airstrikes onto the firing position, 11 PAVN/VC dead were seen in the strike area. At 19:55 a unit of the armored cavalry squadron of the 25th infantry Division in a night defensive position 19 miles (31 km) east-southeast of Tây Ninh was attacked by fire. The unit returned fire supported by artillery, helicopter gunships and an AC-119. The enemy withdrew at 21:30, leaving three dead; U.S. losses were two killed, including First lieutenant Russell A. Steindam who would be posthumously awarded the Medal of Honor for smothering a hand grenade with his body. A UH-1 was shot down 6 miles southwest of Lai Khê killing one U.S. and six ARVN.

On 2 February at 19:00, a mechanized infantry unit from the 1st Brigade, 25th Infantry Division, patrolling 9 miles (14 km) east of Tây Ninh engaged an enemy unit, killing six and capturing one individual weapon. At 20:30 a unit of the 3rd Brigade, 1st Infantry Division, engaged five PAVN/VC 4 miles (6.4 km) east of Lai Khê killing them all and capturing three individual weapons. At 23:15 a convoy was ambushed 6 miles (9.7 km) south of Biên Hòa, the convoy security unit engaged the attackers and the next morning a search of the ambush site found two dead VC and one individual weapon. On 3 February at 01:20, a unit of the 1st Brigade, 1st Cavalry Division, received fire 24 miles (39 km) north-northeast of Tây Ninh. The enemy withdrew after five minutes, but at 03:45 helicopter gunships searching the area engaged an enemy force, killing 13; U.S. losses were one killed. At 12:30 a unit of the 1st Brigade, 1st Cavalry Division, patrolling 6 miles (9.7 km) southeast of Katum engaged an enemy unit. The battle continued until 17:00 when the enemy withdrew, leaving 19 dead and 11 individual weapons. At 13:05 helicopter gunships from the 1/9th Cavalry engaged an enemy force 12 miles (19 km) north of Phước Bình. The enemy withdrew at 18:30, leaving 33 dead among 40 destroyed bunkers. At 19:00 helicopter gunships from the 3rd Brigade, 1st Infantry Division, engaged 100 PAVN/VC 8 miles (13 km) north of Biên Hòa. Air cavalry troops were landed in the area and the enemy withdrew at 20:15, leaving 23 dead. On 4 February at 04:25, a unit of the 1st Brigade, 1st Cavalry Division, at a firebase 25 miles (40 km) north-northeast of Tây Ninh was attacked by fire. The unit returned fire supported by artillery and helicopter gunships and the enemy withdrew after one hour, but as unit troops swept the perimeter they were engaged by an enemy company, the fighting continued until 12:15 when the enemy withdrew, leaving 44 dead and 28 individual weapons, two crew-served weapons and 114 RPG rounds; U.S. losses were four killed.

On 5 February at 18:00, Allied forces began a 24-hour Tết ceasefire. At 18:25 a light observation helicopter from the 1/9th Cavalry received fire 11 miles (18 km) northwest of Katum and returned fire, killing three PAVN/VC. At 18:45 another light observation helicopter from the 1/9th Cavalry received fire 11 miles northwest of Katum and returned fire, killing three PAVN/VC. At 18:55 another light observation helicopter from the 1/9th Cavalry received fire 10 miles (16 km) northwest of Katum and returned fire, killing three PAVN/VC. At 19:25 a unit of the 199th LIB in a night defensive position 14 miles (23 km) west-northwest of Xuân Lộc received fire and returned fire forcing the enemy to withdraw after ten minutes. At 19:35 a unit of the 2nd Brigade, 25th Infantry Division, engaged three PAVN/VC 7 miles (11 km) northeast of Trảng Bàng, killing two. At 19:45 a unit of the 2nd Brigade, 25th Infantry Division, killed one PAVN/VC approaching their night defensive position 6 miles (9.7 km) northeast of Trảng Bàng. At 19:50 a unit of the 3rd Brigade, 9th Infantry Division, in a night defensive position 4 miles (6.4 km) southeast of Lai Khê received RPG fire. At 20:00 a unit of the 11th ACR in a night defensive position 4 miles northwest of Katum engaged enemy forces approaching their position, killing one. At 21:10 a Ranger unit of the 3rd Brigade, 9th Infantry Division, patrolling 9 miles (14 km) east of Tân An received fire and engaged an enemy force, killing one. At 21:40 a unit from the 3rd Brigade, 9th Infantry Division, received fire 6 miles northeast of Tân An, the unit returned fire and the enemy withdrew, leaving four PAVN/VC dead and three individual weapons. At 21:50 a unit from the 3rd Brigade, 9th Infantry Division, received fire 7 miles north-northeast of Tân An and returned fire, killing one PAVN/VC.

On 6 February at 00:15, a unit of the 2nd Brigade, 25th Infantry Division, engaged 20 PAVN/VC moving near their position 6 miles (9.7 km) northeast of Trảng Bàng, the unit was supported by helicopter gunships and an AC-119. The enemy withdrew at 02;10, leaving eight dead and two individual weapons; U.S. losses were two killed. At 01:30 a unit of the 1st Cavalry Division in a night defensive position 2 miles (3.2 km) northeast of Phước Vĩnh killed one PAVN/VC on their perimeter. At 09:50 a unit from the 3rd Brigade, 1st Cavalry Division, received fire 9 miles (14 km) north of Quản Lợi, the unit returned fire supported by artillery, helicopter gunships and airstrikes and the enemy withdrew after 20 minutes. At midday a unit from the 3rd Brigade, 9th Infantry Division, received fire 12 miles (19 km) east-northeast of Tân An, the unit returned fire and the enemy withdrew, leaving two captured and one individual weapon. At 17:45 helicopters from the armored cavalry squadron of the 1st Infantry Division received fire 7 miles (11 km) southeast of Lai Khê and returned fire, air cavalry troops were landed at the firing position and found four PAVN/VC dead and two individual weapons.

On 7 February at 16:40, a light observation helicopter from the 1/9th Cavalry received fire 3 miles (4.8 km) northwest of Lộc Ninh and returned fire and directed artillery and airstrikes onto the firing location, five PAVN/VC dead were seen in the strike area. At 16:50 a unit of the 11th ACR and a unit of the 1st Brigade, 1st Cavalry Division, received fire from an entrenched enemy force 28 miles (45 km) north-northeast of Tây Ninh. The units returned fire supported by artillery and helicopter gunships and the enemy withdrew at 17:50, leaving 14 dead and two individual weapons and one light machine gun. On 8 February at 06:20, a unit of the 1st Brigade, 25th Infantry Division, supported by tanks engaged an enemy force 12 miles (19 km) north of Tây Ninh supported by artillery, helicopter gunships and airstrikes. The enemy withdrew at 16:20, leaving 14 dead and two captured and six individual and one crew-served weapons. At 18:15 a unit of the 3rd Brigade, 1st Cavalry Division, received fire 2 miles (3.2 km) southeast of Lộc Ninh and returned fire supported by artillery and helicopter gunships forcing the enemy to withdraw. At 20:45 a mechanized infantry unit of the 3rd Brigade, 9th Infantry Division, ambushed an enemy unit 11 miles (18 km) southeast of Tân An, the enemy withdrew after 45 minutes, leaving five dead. A USAF OV-10 Bronco was shot down 17 miles (27 km) southeast of Katum.

On 10 February at 18:30, a unit of the armored cavalry squadron of the 1st Infantry Division engaged an enemy force 5 miles (8.0 km) southeast of Bến Cát, the enemy withdrew after 15 minutes, leaving eight dead. At 18:45 a unit of the 2nd Brigade, 1st Cavalry Division, engaged an enemy unit 27 miles (43 km) east-northeast of Phước Bình, the enemy withdrew after 40 minutes, leaving three dead. An OH-6 was shot down 9 miles (14 km) east-southeast of Katum. Specialist Four John Baca would be awarded the Medal of Honor for his actions in smothering an enemy hand grenade with his body. On 11 February at 14:40, helicopter gunships from the 1/9th Cavalry attacked 20 PAVN/VC 9 miles west of Lộc Ninh, killing nine. On 12 February at 09:50, a unit of the 199th LIB received fire 41 miles (66 km) south of Phước Bình, the unit returned fire supported by artillery and helicopter gunships and the enemy withdrew after 30 minutes, leaving eight dead. On 13 February at 11:00, a mechanized infantry unit of the 3rd Brigade, 25th Infantry Division, found a munitions cache 4 miles (6.4 km) southwest of Trảng Bàng containing 59 RPG-2 grenades and 25 RPG-7 grenades. At 13:55 a unit of the 199th LIB engaged seven PAVN/VC 25 miles (40 km) northwest of Xuân Lộc, the enemy withdrew after 25 minutes, leaving two dead and two individual weapons.

On 14 February at 14:45, a unit of the 1st Brigade, 1st Cavalry Division, patrolling 14 miles (23 km) north of Tây Ninh received fire. The unit returned fire supported by artillery and helicopter gunships. The contact was lost at 15:15 but reestablished at 16:15 and the battle continued until 18:40 when the enemy withdrew, leaving 44 dead. U.S. losses were ten killed and one tank and one armored reconnaissance vehicle destroyed. At 19:10 helicopter gunships of the 1st Brigade, 1st Cavalry Division, engaged 10 PAVN/VC 6 miles (9.7 km) northwest of Katum, killing eight. An OH-6 was shot down 7 miles (11 km) south of Bearcat Base. On 15 February at 11:45, a unit of the 2nd Brigade, 1st Cavalry Division, found a 10-ton rice cache 10 miles (16 km) northeast of Đức Phong. At 12:15 a unit of the 1st Brigade, 1st Cavalry Division, was ambushed 12 miles (19 km) north of Tây Ninh, the enemy withdrew after five minutes, leaving three dead; U.S. losses were two killed. At 20:25 a unit of the 3rd Brigade, 25th Infantry Division, operating 1 mile (1.6 km) east of Go Dau Ha engaged an enemy force. The enemy withdrew after 30 minutes, leaving four dead and one individual weapon; U.S. losses were one killed. An OH-6 was shot down 7 miles south of Bearcat, killing one crewman.

On 16 February at 01:40, a helicopter gunship from the 11th Aviation Group received fire 7 miles (11 km) southwest of Bù Đốp and returned fire, killing six PAVN/VC. At 13:40 a unit of the 1st Brigade, 1st Cavalry Division, found 11 PAVN/VC dead 14 miles (23 km) north of Tây Ninh, all had been killed two days previously. An OH-6 was shot down 6 miles (9.7 km) north-northwest of Bearcat. On 17 February at 11:35, helicopters from the 2nd Brigade, 1st Cavalry Division, received fire 12 miles (19 km) north-northeast of Phước Bình, they returned fire and contact continued sporadically until 14:30, 45 PAVN/VC dead were seen in the area. At 12:10 a helicopter from the 11th ACR received fire 6 miles northwest of Lộc Ninh and returned fire and called in artillery and airstrikes on the firing position; seven PAVN/VC dead were seen in the strike area. At 12:25 a unit of the 3rd Brigade, 1st Cavalry Division, engaged an enemy force 11 miles (18 km) northeast of Lộc Ninh, the enemy withdrew, leaving one dead and one individual weapon. On 18 February at 14:25, a UH-1 was shot down 23 miles (37 km) east-northeast of Phước Bình, killing eight on board. A unit of the 2nd Brigade, 1st Cavalry Division, approaching the crash site was engaged by an enemy force and fought them until they withdrew at 16:00, leaving 14 dead. At 16:45 a unit of the 2nd Brigade, 25th Infantry Division, engaged ten PAVN/VC 9 miles (14 km) south of Lai Khê; the enemy withdrew after two hours, leaving four dead and one captured and five individual weapons; U.S. losses were one killed. An OH-6 was shot down 9 miles south-southwest of Lai Khê.

On 19 February at 11:00, a unit of the 199th LIB found a weapons cache 30 miles (48 km) northwest of Xuân Lộc containing 52 rifles, seven light machine guns and 10,000 rounds of small arms ammunition. At 12:40 helicopter gunships from the 11th ACR supported by artillery attacked an enemy force 13 miles (21 km) east of Katum, killing ten. On 20 February at 19:30, a unit of the 1st Brigade, 25th Infantry Division, engaged an enemy force 27 miles (43 km) north-northwest of Tây Ninh supported by helicopter gunships and an AC-119. The enemy withdrew at 20:50; U.S. losses were two killed. At 21:15 a unit of the 3rd Brigade, 9th Infantry Division, and U.S. Navy PBRs attacked a sampan carrying seven PAVN/VC 11 miles (18 km) east of Tân An, killing six and capturing six individual weapons. At 23:15 a unit of the 3rd Brigade, 9th Infantry Division, ambushed an enemy force 6 miles (9.7 km) north-northeast of Tân An, the enemy withdrew after 45 minutes, leaving 11 dead.

On 21 February at 09:55, helicopter gunships from the armored cavalry squadron of the 1st Infantry Division engaged an enemy force 8 miles (13 km) south-southwest of Lai Khê. Air cavalry troops were landed in the area and found ten PAVN/VC dead. At 10:40 an armored unit of the 25th Infantry Division received fire 7 miles (11 km) northeast of Tây Ninh, the unit returned fire and the enemy withdrew at 11:45; U.S. losses were one killed. At 19:30 a unit of the 1st Brigade, 1st Infantry Division, received RPG fire 9 miles (14 km) north-northwest of Lai Khê, the unit returned fire and the enemy withdrew; U.S. losses were one killed. On 22 February at 03:05, a unit of the 3rd Brigade, 9th Infantry Division, engaged an enemy force 7 miles north-northeast of Tân An, killing five PAVN/VC. At 17:30 a unit of the 1st cavalry Division found a weapons cache 37 miles (60 km) south of Phước Bình containing five SKS, nine submachineguns, four light machine guns, two heavy machine guns and assorted munitions. A UH-1 was shot down 7 miles north-northeast of Lộc Ninh.

On 24 February at 16:35, the 1/9th Cavalry attacked an enemy force 11 miles (18 km) west-southwest of Katum, killing six PAVN/VC. On 25 February at 03:10, a unit of the 11th ACR in a night defensive position 5 miles (8.0 km) north-northeast of Lộc Ninh was attacked by fire. The unit was supported by artillery and helicopter gunships and the enemy withdrew at 04:30, leaving two dead and one RPG launcher and various munitions. At 07:00 a unit of the 2nd Brigade, 1st Cavalry Division, searching the scene of a mechanical ambush 3 miles (4.8 km) southeast of Phước Bình founds four PAVN/VC dead and were then attacked by an enemy force. The unit was supported by artillery and helicopter gunships and the enemy withdrew after 20 minutes, leaving eight dead and seven individual weapons. On 26 February at 11:50, a unit of the 11th ACR engaged an enemy force 5 miles (8.0 km) southeast of Katum, the enemy withdrew after 25 minutes. U.S. losses were one killed.

On 27 February at 16:20, an armored cavalry unit of the 199th LIB received RPG fire 20 miles (32 km) north of Hàm Tân District the unit returned fire supported by helicopter gunships and the enemy withdrew, leaving seven dead and two individual weapons. At 22:15 a unit of the 3rd Brigade, 9th Infantry Division, engaged an enemy force 10 miles (16 km) east of Tân An, the enemy withdrew after 20 minutes, leaving seven dead. On 28 February at midnight ten 122 mm rockets hit Bien Hoa Air Base, killing one Vietnamese civilian and destroying two houses. At 11:00 a unit of the 3rd Brigade, 9th Infantry Division, engaged an enemy force 7 miles (11 km) east-northeast of Tân An supported by artillery, helicopter gunships and airstrikes. The enemy withdrew at 16:15, leaving eight dead and 13 individual weapons and one light machine gun; U.S. losses were one killed. At 15:20 a unit of the 2nd Brigade, 1st Cavalry Division, engaged an enemy unit 9 miles (14 km) west-northwest of Katum, the enemy withdrew after 20 minutes, leaving seven dead; U.S. losses were one killed. At 17:15 the 1/9th Cavalry attacked 25 PAVN/VC 8 miles (13 km) northeast of Lộc Ninh, the enemy withdrew at 18:25, leaving six dead. At 19:20 a unit of the 1st Brigade, 25th Infantry Division, engaged 15 PAVN/VC 5 miles (8.0 km) north-northeast of Tây Ninh, the enemy withdrew after 25 minutes, leaving six dead.

Cumulative operational results to the end of February were 10,832 PAVN/VC killed and 4,148 individual and 418 crew-served weapons captured. U.S. losses were 458 killed.

=== March ===
On 1 March at 09:50 a unit of the 199th LIB engaged an enemy unit 25 miles (40 km) north-northwest of Hàm Tân supported by artillery, helicopter gunships and airstrikes. The enemy withdrew at 14:05; U.S. losses were two killed. At 10:35 a unit of the 1st Cavalry Division found a 60-ton rice cache 32 miles (51 km) north of Tây Ninh and 1 mile (1.6 km) south of the Cambodian border. On 2 March at 03:35 a unit of the 11th ACR was attacked by fire 25 miles (40 km) north-northeast of Tây Ninh. The unit returned fire supported by artillery and helicopter gunships and the enemy withdrew at 04:25; U.S. losses were one killed. At 04:45 helicopter gunships from the 11th Aviation Group engaged an enemy force 21 miles (34 km) northeast of Phước Bình, killing ten. At 09:00 a unit of the 3rd Brigade, 9th Infantry Division, operating 10 miles (16 km) east of Tân An found 11 PAVN/VC dead, all had been killed in the previous 24 hours. Also at 09:00 a unit of the 11th ACR operating 30 miles (48 km) northeast of Tây Ninh engaged nine PAVN/VC, the enemy withdrew after 30 minutes, leaving six dead. At 11:15 a unit of the 11th ACR supported by artillery and helicopter gunships engaged an enemy unit 2 miles (3.2 km) west of Lộc Ninh, the enemy withdrew after 45 minutes, leaving 27 dead and 13 individual weapons. A UH-1 was shot down 9 miles (14 km) northeast of Phước Bình.

On 3 March at 07:30 a unit of the 1st Brigade, 1st Cavalry Division, supported by artillery and helicopter gunships engaged an enemy force 30 miles (48 km) northeast of Tây Ninh, the enemy withdrew, leaving ten dead and ten individual weapons. At 17:00 a unit of the 3rd Brigade, 1st Cavalry Division, engaged an enemy force 6 miles (9.7 km) southeast of Lộc Ninh, the enemy withdrew after 15 minutes, leaving one dead and various munitions. A UH-1 was shot down 6 miles northeast of Bearcat. On 4 March at 06:15 a unit of the 1st Brigade, 1st Cavalry Division, in a night defensive position 29 miles (47 km) north of Tây Ninh received mortar fire followed by a ground probe. The unit returned fire supported by artillery and helicopter gunships and the enemy withdrew after five minutes, leaving 37 dead and 12 individual weapons; U.S. losses were one killed. An OH-6 was shot down 11 miles (18 km) northwest of Katum. On 5 March at 00:30 a unit of the 11th ACR in a night defensive position 30 miles northeast of Tây Ninh received fire and returned fire supported by artillery and helicopter gunships. The enemy withdrew after an hour, leaving six dead; U.S. losses were one killed. At 11:40 a unit of the 1st Brigade, 1st Cavalry Division, engaged an enemy force 30 miles north of Tây Ninh, the enemy withdrew immediately and a search of the area found a weapons cache containing 109 individual and three crew-served weapons. At 11:50 a unit of the 11th ACR engaged an enemy force 8 miles (13 km) east-southeast of Katum. The unit was supported by artillery, helicopter gunships and airstrikes and the enemy withdrew at 17:00, leaving 17 dead. At 16:15 a unit of the 2nd Brigade, 1st Cavalry Division, engaged four PAVN/VC 22 miles (35 km) northeast of Sông Bé, the enemy immediately withdrew and search of the area found a weapons cache containing 49 SKS, 35 bolt-action rifles, 1,100 82 mm mortar rounds, 340 RPG grenades and 43,000 rounds of small arms ammunition. A UH-1 was shot down 20 miles (32 km) north-northeast of Phước Bình and 1 mile from the Cambodian border, killing four on board.

On 6 March at 09:45 a unit of the 11th ACR engaged an enemy force 7 miles (11 km) southeast of Katum, the enemy withdrew after 30 minutes, leaving 31 dead. At 09:55 a unit of the 1st Brigade, 1st Cavalry Division, engaged an enemy company 9 miles (14 km) west-northwest of Katum, the enemy withdrew after three hours, leaving 21 dead; U.S. losses were one killed. At 11:25 the 1/9th Cavalry engaged 10–15 PAVN/VC 9 miles northeast of Lộc Ninh and 1 mile (1.6 km) from the Cambodian border, killing six. At 17:35 the 1/9th Cavalry engaged an enemy force 9 miles northeast of Lộc Ninh, the enemy withdrew after 40 minutes, leaving eight dead; U.S. losses were one killed. A UH-1 was shot down 9 miles southeast of Bến Tre. On 7 March at 06:30 a unit of the 1st brigade, 1st Cavalry Division in a night defensive position 11 miles (18 km) northwest of Katum received mortar and RPG fire followed by a ground probe. The unit returned fire supported by artillery and the enemy withdrew, leaving 13 dead and four individual and three crew-served weapons. At 12:30 a unit of the 199th LIB operating 20 miles (32 km) north of Hàm Tân found an enemy cache defended by a platoon who engaged the unit but withdrew after 40 minutes, leaving four dead and two individual weapons, the cache totaled 7.5 tons of flour.

On 8 March at 13:15 a unit of the 2nd Brigade, 1st Cavalry Division, engaged an enemy force 19 miles (31 km) northeast of Phước Bình. Contact was lost at 14:45 then reestablished and then lost at 19:00. Four PAVN/VC were killed and three U.S. killed. At 16:25 a unit of the 1st Brigade, 1st Cavalry Division, engaged an enemy unit 29 miles (47 km) north of Tây Ninh supported by artillery, helicopter gunships and airstrikes. The enemy withdrew after 25 minutes, leaving 29 dead; U.S. losses were three killed. At 19:55 a unit of the 3rd Brigade, 1st Cavalry Division, and an RF unit received fire 5 miles (8.0 km) southeast of Lộc Ninh, the units returned fire supported by artillery and the enemy withdrew after ten minutes. A UH-1 was shot down 5 miles (8.0 km) south of Phước Bình and an OH-6 was shot down 13 miles (21 km) northwest of Phước Bình. On 9 March at 04:05 a unit of the 1st Brigade, 1st Cavalry Division, at a firebase 26 miles (42 km) north of Tây Ninh received 150 rounds of 82 mm mortar fire. The unit returned fire and artillery and helicopter gunships were directed onto the firing positions. A sweep of the area at dawn found ten PAVN/VC dead and four destroyed bunkers. A CH-47 Chinook crashed shortly after takeoff from Quản Lợi Base Camp, killing five on board.

On 10 March at 08:35 a unit of the 11th ACR engaged a battalion from the PAVN 9th Division 25 miles (40 km) north-northeast of Tây Ninh. The unit was supported by artillery, helicopter gunships and airstrikes and the PAVN withdrew at 13:15, leaving 32 dead, two individual weapons a 57 mm recoilless rifle and a field telephone; U.S. losses were four killed At 10:30 a unit of the 11th ACR engaged a battalion from the PAVN 7th Division 4 miles (6.4 km) southwest of Lộc Ninh. The unit was supported by artillery, helicopter gunships and airstrikes and the enemy withdrew at midday, leaving 54 dead and five captured and 19 individual and 10 crew-served weapons; U.S. losses were four killed. At 11:55 Rangers from the 199th LIB engaged six PAVN/VC 22 miles (35 km) north-northwest of Xuân Lộc, killing five and capturing one and three individual weapons. At 13:15 a mechanized infantry unit of the 3rd Brigade, 9th Infantry Division, engaged an enemy unit 6 miles (9.7 km) northeast of Tân An, killing nine and capturing three individual weapons. At 14:45 a unit of the 1st Brigade, 1st Cavalry Division, found a food cache 30 miles (48 km) north of Tây Ninh containing 23 tons of rice, four PAVN/VC dead and two individual weapons were found nearby who had been killed by airstrikes. At 18:25 helicopter gunships from the 1/9th Cavalry received fire 9 miles (14 km) northeast of Lộc Ninh and attacked the position and directed artillery onto the area, the enemy withdrew after 30 minutes and 26 dead were seen in the strike area.

On 11 March at 07:50 a unit of the 1st Brigade, 1st Cavalry Division, operating 10 miles (16 km) northwest of Katum engaged an enemy force, killing six in a four-hour battle. At 13:45 a unit of the 199th LIB found a food cache 25 miles (40 km) northwest of Xuân Lộc. An OH-58 Kiowa light observation helicopter was shot down 17 miles (27 km) southeast of Biên Hòa. An OH-6 was shot down 12 miles (19 km) northwest of Katum. On 12 March at 06:00 a unit of the 1st Brigade, 1st Cavalry Division, in a night defensive position 9 miles (14 km) northwest of Katum was attacked by fire and the unit returned fire supported by artillery and helicopter gunships. The enemy withdrew after 35 minutes, leaving eight dead and one individual weapon. At 06:30 a unit of the 11th ACR and troops from the 1st Brigade, 1st Cavalry Division, in a night defensive position 29 miles (47 km) north-northeast of Tây Ninh was attacked by fire. The units returned fire supported by artillery and helicopter gunships. The enemy withdrew at 10:30, leaving 29 dead and eight individual weapons; U.S. losses were four killed. At 12:30 a unit of the 3rd Brigade, 25th Infantry Division, engaged an enemy force 19 miles (31 km) south-southeast of Tây Ninh, the enemy withdrew at 17:15, leaving 11 dead and two 60 mm mortars. At 17:10 a U.S. Navy PBR received RPG fire 11 miles (18 km) northeast of Go Dau Ha, the PBR returned fire supported by artillery and helicopter gunships and the enemy withdrew after 20 minutes; U.S. losses were one killed. At 17:15 a unit of the 3rd Brigade, 1st Cavalry Division, received fire 9 miles northwest of Sông Bé, the unit returned fire and the enemy withdrew, leaving six dead and two individual weapons; U.S. losses were three killed. A UH-1 crashed 7 miles (11 km) from Bà Rịa, killing all ten on board. An OH-6 was shot down 16 miles (26 km) southwest of Sông Bé.

On 13 March at 14:25 a light observation helicopter from the 1/9th Cavalry attacked 20 PAVN/VC 20 miles (32 km) north-northeast of Phước Bình supported by artillery, eight bodies were seen in the strike area. At 15:15 a unit of the 1/9th Cavalry operating 16 miles (26 km) west-northwest of Sông Bé engaged an enemy force, the enemy withdrew after 35 minutes, leaving six dead and one individual weapon. On 14 March at 06:00 a unit of the 1st Brigade, 1st Cavalry Division, in a night defensive position 29 miles (47 km) north of Tây Ninh was attacked by fire. The unit returned fire supported by artillery and helicopter gunships. The enemy withdrew, leaving 12 dead; U.S. losses were one killed. As the unit was searching the battle area an AH-1 experienced a weapons system malfunction and fired several 2.75in rockets into the unit, killing three. At 15:05 a unit of the 199th LIB received fire 24 miles (39 km) north-northwest of Hàm Tân, the unit returned fire supported by artillery and helicopter gunships; U.S. losses were two killed. At 16:10 a unit of the 1st Brigade, 1st Cavalry Division, engaged an enemy force 28 miles (45 km) north of Tây Ninh, the enemy withdrew after five minutes, leaving ten dead. At 19:20 helicopters from the 1/9th Cavalry attacked an enemy force 13 miles (21 km) north of Tây Ninh and nine bodies were seen in the strike area.

On 15 March at 10:20 mechanized infantry from the 1st Brigade, 25th Infantry Division, was attacked 8 miles (13 km) northeast of Tây Ninh, the unit returned fie supported by artillery, helicopter gunships and airstrikes. The enemy withdrew at 19:00; U.S. losses were one killed. At 15:00 helicopter gunships from the 1/9th Cavalry received fire 21 miles (34 km) north-northeast of Phước Bình and engaged the firing position, 12 PAVN/VC dead were seen in the strike area. At 16:35 a unit of the 3rd Brigade, 1st Cavalry Division, engaged 20–30 PAVN/VC 18 miles (29 km) northeast of Phước Bình, the enemy withdrew after an hour, leaving five dead; U.S. losses were two killed. A UH-1 was shot down 20 miles (32 km) north-northeast of Phước Bình, killing one on board. On 16 March at 14:20 a unit of the 1st Brigade, 1st Cavalry Division, saw six PAVN/VC 27 miles (43 km) north of Tây Ninh and directed artillery fire onto the position, killing all six. At 15:30 a mechanized infantry unit of the 1st Brigade, 25th Infantry Division, received fire 9 miles (14 km) northeast of Tây Ninh and returned fire supported by artillery, helicopter gunships and airstrikes. The enemy withdrew at 18:45, leaving 25 dead; U.S. losses were two killed. At 15:40 1 mile (1.6 km) to the southeast an infantry unit from the 1st Brigade received fire and returned fire supported by artillery, helicopter gunships and airstrikes which forced the enemy to withdraw at 18:00.

On 17 March at 11:00 helicopters from the 11th ACR saw 13 PAVN/VC dead at the scene of an airstrikes 26 miles (42 km) northeast of Tây Ninh and engaged two PAVN/VC, killing both of them. At 11:50 a helicopter gunship from the 1/9th Cavalry received fire 10 miles (16 km) northwest of Katum, they returned fire and 16 PAVN/VC dead were seen in the strike area. At 14:15 a unit of the 1st Brigade, 1st Cavalry Division, engaged an enemy force 24 miles (39 km) north-northwest of Tây Ninh, the enemy withdrew after 30 minutes, leaving ten dead; U.S. losses were one killed. At 20:25 a unit from the 3rd Brigade, 25th Infantry Division, received fire 20 miles (32 km) south-southeast of Tây Ninh, the enemy withdrew after 20 minutes, leaving six dead and two individual weapons and two RPG launchers; U.S. losses were one killed. On 18 March at 11:10 a unit of the 1st Brigade, 1st Cavalry Division, engaged an enemy unit 24 miles (39 km) north-northwest of Tây Ninh, the unit was supported by artillery, helicopter gunships and airstrikes and the enemy withdrew after 15 minutes. At 14:30 a unit of the 3rd Brigade, 1st Cavalry Division, received fire 18 miles (29 km) northeast of Phước Bình and returned fire supported by artillery and helicopter gunships. The enemy withdrew after 15 minutes, leaving five dead; U.S. losses were one killed. An OH-6 was shot down 13 miles (21 km) north-northwest of Sông Bé.

On 19 March at 12:15 troops from the 1/9th Cavalry engaged an enemy force 20 miles (32 km) northwest of Tây Ninh. A unit of the 1st Brigade reinforced the contact and artillery and helicopter gunships provided support. The enemy withdrew at 13:30, leaving 39 dead and 13 AK-47s and one RPG-2 launcher. At 14:15 a unit of the 1st Brigade, 1st Cavalry Division, found 39 PAVN/VC dead in mass graves 24 miles (39 km) north-northwest of Tây Ninh, all killed fighting the unit the previous day. At 20:05 a unit of the 2nd Brigade, 25th Infantry Division, engaged 10–12 PAVN/VC 6 miles (9.7 km) south of Go Dau Ha, the enemy withdrew immediately, leaving five dead. On 20 March at 02:45 a unit of the 3rd Brigade, 9th Infantry Division, engaged an enemy force 7 miles (11 km) east of Tân An, the enemy withdrew after five minutes, leaving six dead and three individual weapons. At 11:15 a unit of the 3rd Brigade, 9th Infantry Division, found an 8-ton rice cache 14 miles (23 km) west-northwest of Phước Bình. At 18:15 a helicopter gunship from the 1/9th Cavalry received fire 7 miles northeast of Phước Bình and returned fire, killing six PAVN/VC. On 21 March at 11:40 helicopters from the 1/9th Cavalry found a rice cache 18 miles (29 km) northeast of Phước Bình.

On 22 March at 08:40 a unit of the 3rd Brigade, 1st Cavalry Division, found a 6.5-ton rice cache 14 miles (23 km) west-northwest of Phước Bình. At 12:05 a unit of the 2nd Brigade, 1st Cavalry Division, engaged an enemy force 18 miles (29 km) northeast of Phước Bình, the enemy withdrew after 20 minutes, leaving 17 dead; U.S. losses were one killed. At 21:05 a unit of the 3rd Brigade, 25th Infantry Division, engaged an enemy force 4 miles (6.4 km) northwest of Củ Chi supported by artillery and helicopter gunships. The enemy withdrew after 50 minutes, leaving nine dead and two individual weapons. At 23:45 a helicopter from the 11th Aviation Group engaged 30–40 PAVN/VC 8 miles (13 km) west of Lộc Ninh, the bodies of 30 PAVN/VC were seen in the strike area. A UH-1 was shot down 19 miles (31 km) southeast of Biên Hòa. An OH-6 was shot down 14 miles (23 km) south-southeast of Lai Khê. On 23 March at 10:00 a unit of the 3rd Brigade, 1st Cavalry Division, patrolling 15 miles (24 km) northwest of Phước Bình found two rice caches totaling 16 tons. At 22:20 a unit of the 3rd Brigade, 9th Infantry Division, engaged an enemy force 8 miles (13 km) east-southeast of Tân An. The unit was supported by artillery and helicopter gunships and the enemy withdrew after an hour, leaving four dead and one individual weapon; U.S. losses were one killed.

On 24 March at 10:30 a unit of the 1st Brigade, 1st Cavalry Division, engaged an enemy squad 20 miles (32 km) northwest of Tây Ninh, the enemy withdrew immediately, leaving five dead and three individual weapons. At 11:00 the same unit engaged another enemy force 2 miles (3.2 km) to the south-southwest, killing another five. At 12:30 an infantry unit from the 2nd Brigade, 1st Cavalry Division, found a munitions cache 8 miles (13 km) northwest of Phước Bình containing 11,300 rounds of small arms ammunition, 54 60 mm mortar rounds, 49 75 mm recoilless rifle rounds and six RPG-2 grenades. At 15:00 a unit of the 3rd Brigade, 1st Cavalry Division, engaged an enemy force 13 miles (21 km) west-northwest of Phước Bình supported by artillery, helicopter gunships and airstrikes. The enemy withdrew at 18:10, leaving 20 dead. An OH-6 was shot down 11 miles (18 km) southwest of Sông Bé. On 25 March at 15:40 a Ranger unit of the 3rd Brigade, 9th Infantry Division, engaged an enemy platoon 15 miles (24 km) north of Tân An, killing five and capturing one.

On 26 March at 11:45 a unit of the 1st Brigade, 1st Cavalry Division, engaged an enemy force 25 miles (40 km) north-northwest of Tây Ninh supported by artillery, helicopter gunships and airstrikes. Another brigade unit and a unit from the 11th ACR reinforced and the enemy withdrew at 19:10, leaving 88 dead; U.S. losses were two killed. At 13:40 helicopters from the 11th ACR attacked 15-20 PAVN/VC 28 miles (45 km) north-northeast of Tây Ninh, killing 15. An OH-6 crashed due to mechanical failure 7 miles (11 km) northeast of Tân An. On 27 March at 01:25 a unit of the 3rd Brigade, 9th Infantry Division, engaged an enemy force 10 miles (16 km) north-northwest of Tân An supported by helicopter gunships. The enemy withdrew after 25 minutes, leaving 11 dead and five individual and two crew-served weapons. On 28 March at 12:20 a unit of the 11th ACR engaged an enemy unit 30 miles (48 km) northeast of Tây Ninh, the enemy withdrew immediately, leaving five dead and four individual weapons. At 13:00 a unit of the 2nd Brigade, 1st Cavalry Division, engaged an enemy force 24 miles (39 km) north-northeast of Phước Bình, the enemy withdrew at 15:20, leaving 23 dead; U.S. losses were five killed. At 16:45 a helicopter from the 1st Brigade, 25th Infantry Division, received fire while landing troops 4 miles (6.4 km) north of Dầu Tiếng, the troops returned fire and mechanized infantry from the Brigade moved to join the battle. The enemy withdrew at 17:30, leaving three dead; U.S. losses were one killed. At 19:30 a unit of the 2nd Brigade, 1st Cavalry Division, in a night defensive position 23 miles (37 km) north-northeast of Phước Bình received fire, the unit returned fire and the enemy withdrew, leaving five dead.

On 29 March at 04:50 Companies A and E, 2nd Battalion, 7th Cavalry Regiment, B Battery, 2nd Battalion, 12th Artillery and B Battery, 2nd Battalion, 19th Artillery at Firebase Jay 20 miles (32 km) north-northwest of Tây Ninh received mortar and rocket fire followed by a ground assault by a PAVN battalion from the 9th Division. The units returned fire supported by artillery, helicopter gunships and an AC-119. The enemy withdrew at 06:00, leaving 74 dead and three captured and 12 AK-47s; U.S. losses were 13 killed. On 30 March at 14:45 a Ranger unit from the 1st Cavalry Division engaged an enemy unit 28 miles (45 km) northeast of Phước Bình, the enemy withdrew after 15 minutes, leaving eight dead and three AK-47s. At 17:45 a unit of the 2nd Brigade, 1st Cavalry Division, found 21 PAVN/VC dead 24 miles (39 km) north-northeast of Phước Bình, all had been killed in the previous two days. At 18:00 a helicopter from the 1/9th Cavalry received fire 26 miles (42 km) north-northwest of Tây Ninh and returned fire supported by other helicopter gunships, killing ten PAVN/VC. A UH-1 medevac helicopter was shot down 9 miles (14 km) north of Phước Bình.

On 31 March at 01:35 Tây Ninh Combat Base was attacked by fire. The defenders returned fire supported by artillery and helicopter gunships. The enemy withdrew at 05:15, leaving six dead and two captured and three AK-47s, four RPG-7 launchers and a pistol. At 10:10 a unit of the 199th LIB received fire 25 miles (40 km) north-northwest of Hàm Tân, the unit returned fire supported by artillery, helicopter gunships and airstrikes. The enemy withdrew after 35 minutes, leaving two dead; U.S. losses were two killed. At 11:15 a unit of the 1st Brigade, 25th Infantry Division, received fire 10 miles (16 km) west of Lai Khê, the unit returned fire and the enemy withdrew; U.S. losses were one killed. At 12:45 a unit of the 11th ACR engaged an enemy force 27 miles (43 km) north-northwest of Tây Ninh supported by artillery and helicopter gunships. The enemy withdrew at 15:30, leaving 30 dead and 16 captured and five individual and two crew-served weapons. At 19:25 a helicopter from the 1/9th Cavalry attacked eight PAVN/VC in bunkers 14 miles (23 km) northwest of Katum supported by artillery, five dead were seen amongst four destroyed bunkers. At 20:50 a unit of the 3rd Brigade, 25th Infantry Division, operating 9 miles (14 km) west-southwest of Trảng Bàng engaged an enemy force, killing six and capturing three individual weapons. A UH-1 was shot down 14 miles (23 km) south of Bến Tre, killing one U.S. and three ARVN soldiers.

Cumulative operational results to the end of March were 13,614 PAVN/VC killed and 5,298 individual and 529 crew-served weapons captured. U.S. losses were 628 killed.

=== April ===
On 1 April during the early morning most Allied bases in the operational area received attacks by fire causing minimal damage. At 01:20 Firebase Illingworth 22 miles (35 km) north-northwest of Tây Ninh occupied by Companies C and E, 2nd Battalion, 8th Cavalry Regiment, B Battery, 5th Battalion, 2nd Artillery, A Battery, 1st Battalion, 30th Artillery, A Battery, 2nd Battalion, 32nd Artillery and B Battery, 1st Battalion, 77th Artillery received over 200 rounds of mortar and rocket fire followed by a ground assault by two companies. The units fought back supported by artillery and helicopter gunships and was then reinforced by a unit from the 11th ACR. The enemy withdrew at 04:30, leaving 62 dead and 28 individual weapons; U.S. losses were 24 killed. Specialist Four Peter C. Lemon would be awarded the Medal of Honor for his actions during the battle. At 02:45 a unit of the 3rd Brigade, 25th Infantry Division, at a fire base 12 miles (19 km) south-southeast of Tây Ninh was attacked by fire, the unit returned fire supported by artillery and helicopter gunships and the enemy withdrew after 30 minutes. At 09:05 a unit of the 11th ACR operating 27 miles (43 km) north-northwest of Tây Ninh engaged an enemy force. The unit was supported by artillery and helicopter gunships and reinforced by another unit from the Regiment. The enemy withdrew after three hours, leaving 12 dead and one captured and nine individual and two crew-served weapons; U.S. losses were one killed. At 09:20 armored cavalry from the 199th LIB received fire 37 miles (60 km) north-northwest of Hàm Tân, the unit returned fire and was supported by artillery, helicopter gunships and airstrikes. The enemy withdrew at 14:30, leaving seven dead and two individual and one crew-served weapons; U.S. losses were four killed, including 199th LIB commander, Brigadier General William R. Bond. At 13:00 helicopters from the 1/9th Cavalry attacked nine PAVN/VC 32 miles (51 km) north of Tây Ninh, killing all nine. An OH-6 was shot down 33 miles (53 km) northwest of Tây Ninh.

On 2 April at 08:45 a reconnaissance unit of the 25th Infantry Division received fire 10 miles (16 km) south-southeast of Tây Ninh, the unit returned fire supported by helicopter gunships and the enemy withdrew after 15 minutes, leaving 12 dead; U.S. losses were two killed. Thirty minutes later a unit of the 3rd Brigade moved into the area and engaged an enemy force supported by helicopter gunships and airstrikes, fighting continued until the enemy withdrew at 18:40, leaving 20 dead; U.S. losses were eight killed. On 3 April at 07:45 a unit of the 2nd Brigade, 25th Infantry Division, engaged nine PAVN/VC 8 miles (13 km) northwest of Go Dau Ha, the enemy withdrew after 15 minutes, leaving six dead. At 14:15 a USAF FAC attacked ten PAVN/VC 7 miles (11 km) northwest of Go Dau Ha, killing six. On 4 April at 14:00 a unit of the 2nd Brigade, 1st Cavalry Division, found a munitions cache 22 miles (35 km) north-northeast of Phước Bình containing 61,000 rounds of small arms ammunition. On 5 April at 09:30 a unit of the 1st brigade, 1st Cavalry Division found a munitions cache 22 miles (35 km) north-northeast of Phước Bình containing 134,000 rounds of small arms ammunition and 46 82 mm mortar rounds. At 10:35 a unit of the 1st Brigade, 1st Cavalry Division, was ambushed by an enemy unit 20 miles (32 km) northwest of Tây Ninh, the unit was supported by artillery, helicopter gunships and airstrikes and the enemy withdrew; U.S. losses were seven killed. At 12:25 a mechanized infantry unit of the 25th Infantry Division engaged an enemy force 7 miles northeast of Tây Ninh, the enemy withdrew after 25 minutes, leaving six dead and one individual and one crew-served weapons; U.S. losses were two killed.

On 6 April at 08:00 a unit of the 2nd Brigade, 1st Cavalry Division, found a munitions cache 24 miles (39 km) north-northeast of Phước Bình containing 265,000 rounds of small arms ammunition. On 7 April at 07:40 a unit of the 199th LIB received fire 16 miles (26 km) east-southeast of Biên Hòa, the enemy withdrew after 30 minutes but as the unit swept the area they were attacked again and the skirmish continued until 12:45 when the enemy withdrew, leaving three dead; U.S. losses were one killed. At 11:30 a unit of the 1st Brigade, 25th Infantry Division, was ambushed 12 miles (19 km) south-southwest of Tây Ninh, the action continued until the enemy withdrew at 18:45; U.S. losses were five killed. At 17:45 a unit of the 199th LIB received fire 14 miles (23 km) northeast of Biên Hòa, the enemy withdrew after an hour. An AH-1 was shot down 13 miles (21 km) south of Tây Ninh, killing one crewman. On 9 April at 13:10 a unit of the 1st Brigade, 25th Infantry Division, received fire 9 miles (14 km) west-southwest of Lai Khê, the enemy withdrew at 16:30; U.S. losses were one killed. An OH-6 was shot down 14 miles northwest of Lộc Ninh.

On 10 April at 05:30 a mechanized infantry unit of the 1st Brigade, 25th Infantry Division, in a night defensive position 15 miles (24 km) northwest of Tây Ninh was attacked by fire, the unit returned fire supported by artillery and the enemy withdrew after an hour, leaving 12 dead and one RPG launcher; U.S. losses were two killed. At 17:25 helicopter gunships from the 1/9th Cavalry attacked seven PAVN/VC 17 miles (27 km) north-northwest of Tây Ninh, killing seven. On 11 April at 11:20 a mechanized unit of the 25th Infantry Division operating 18 miles (29 km) north-northwest of Tây Ninh engaged an enemy unit supported by artillery, helicopter gunships and airstrikes. The enemy withdrew at 13:20 but contact was reestablished at 16:10 and the enemy finally withdrew at 16:40, leaving 26 dead and seven individual and four crew-served weapons; U.S. losses were two killed. At 16:00 a unit of the 199th LIB engaged ten PAVN/VC 33 miles (53 km) north-northwest of Hàm Tân, killing five and capturing five individual weapons.

On 12 April at 08:55 helicopter gunships from the 1/9th Cavalry received fire 24 miles (39 km) northeast of Tây Ninh, the gunships returned fire and also called in artillery and airstrikes and 12 PAVN/VC dead were seen in the strike area. A UH-1 was shot down 16 miles (26 km) east-southeast of Katum, killing two on board. An OH-58 was shot down 2 miles (3.2 km) north of Bình Sơn. On 13 April at 12:15 a unit of the 11th ACR engaged an enemy force 29 miles (47 km) northeast of Tây Ninh supported by artillery, helicopter gunships and airstrikes. The enemy withdrew at 16:00, leaving 31 dead and one individual weapon, an RPG-2 launcher and a 60 mm mortar. At 15:20 helicopters from the 1/9th Cavalry received fire 22 miles (35 km) northeast of Tây Ninh and attacked the firing position causing three secondary explosions, the bodies of 28 PAVN/VC dead were seen in the strike area. At 17:00 a unit of the 11th ACR engaged eight PAVN/VC 18 miles (29 km) northwest of Tây Ninh, killing seven and capturing one and two AK-47s, two light machine guns and one RPG-2 launcher. At 23:30 four 122 mm rockets hit central Saigon, killing two civilians.

On 14 April at 09:45, a unit of the 1st Brigade, 1st Cavalry Division, engaged four PAVN/VC 22 miles (35 km) northeast of Tây Ninh, killing one. At 16:40 a unit of the 11th ACR found 17 PAVN/VC dead 17 miles (27 km) northwest of Tây Ninh, all had been killed in the previous 24 hours. On 15 April at 02:30 a unit of the 11th ACR at a firebase 17 miles northwest of Tây Ninh was attacked by fire, and the unit returned fire supported by helicopter gunships. The enemy withdrew and a search of the area at dawn found 18 PAVN/VC dead, 11 individual and three crew-served weapons and two 60 mm mortars. At 15:00 helicopters from the 1st Brigade, 1st Cavalry Division, attacked 36 PAVN/VC 32 miles (51 km) north-northwest of Tây Ninh and half a mile from the Cambodian border, killing 12. At 21:45 a unit of the 11th ACR at a firebase 23 miles (37 km) northwest of Tây Ninh received mortar and rockets fire followed by a ground assault. The unit returned fire supported by artillery, helicopter gunships and airstrikes, and the enemy withdrew at midnight. A search of the area found 55 PAVN/VC dead and three captured and 17 individual and seven crew-served weapons; U.S. losses were seven killed.

On 16 April at 02:20 four 122 mm rockets hit central Saigon, causing minor damage. At 08:45 a unit of the 1st Brigade, 1st Cavalry Division, engaged an enemy unit 22 miles (35 km) northwest of Tây Ninh, killing seven and capturing one AK-47. On 17 April at 08:00 a unit of the 3rd Brigade, 1st Cavalry Division, found eight PAVN/VC dead and five individual weapons 30 miles (48 km) northeast of Tây Ninh. At 15:35 a unit of the 1st Brigade, 25th Infantry Division, engaged an enemy force 6 miles (9.7 km) south-southwest of Dầu Tiếng, the enemy withdrew at 19:00, leaving nine dead and six individual and one crew-served weapons; U.S. losses were one killed. A UH-1 hit power lines and crashed into the Đồng Nai river 3 miles (4.8 km) south of Biên Hòa, killing 11 on board. On 18 April at 03:00 a unit of the 199th LIB in a night defensive position 37 miles (60 km) north-northwest of Hàm Tân was attacked by fire, the unit returned fire supported by artillery and helicopter gunships, and the enemy withdrew at 04:35, leaving 23 PAVN dead and two captured and four individual and four crew-served weapons; U.S. losses were one killed. At 12:50 a unit of the 2nd Brigade, 1st Cavalry Division, engaged an enemy force 14 miles (23 km) northeast of Phước Bình; the enemy withdrew after 35 minutes, leaving six dead; U.S. losses were one killed. At 14:50 a unit of the 199th LIB was attacked 16 miles (26 km) east-southeast of Biên Hòa; the unit returned fire and was supported by artillery, helicopter gunships and airstrikes, and the enemy withdrew at 17:45; U.S. losses were two killed. At 17:00 a helicopter from the 1/9th Cavalry received fire 15 miles (24 km) southwest of An Lộc and returned fire, killing 21 PAVN/VC.

On 19 April at 17:10 a unit of the 3rd Brigade, 9th Infantry Division, engaged an enemy force 6 miles (9.7 km) north-northeast of Tân An, killing seven. A UH-1 was shot down 18 miles (29 km) southeast of Biên Hòa. On 20 April at 00:15 helicopters from the 3rd Brigade, 1st Cavalry Division, attacked 30 PAVN/VC 22 miles (35 km) northeast of Tây Ninh, killing ten. An OH-6 was shot down 6 miles south of Bến Cát. On 21 April an OH-6 was shot down 14 miles (23 km) east-northeast of Biên Hòa, killing one crewman. On 22 April at 11:20 a unit of the 2nd Brigade, 1st Cavalry Division, engaged an enemy force 18 miles east-northeast of Phước Bình, the enemy withdrew after 15 minutes, leaving three dead; U.S. losses were one killed. At 14:20 an armored unit of the 1st Brigade, 25th Infantry Division, operating 18 miles southeast of Biên Hòa engaged an enemy force, killing five and capturing five individual weapons. At 17:20 a unit of the 1/9th Cavalry engaged an enemy force 27 miles (43 km) southeast of Phước Bình, killing 12 PAVN/VC. An OH-6 was shot down 5 miles (8.0 km) southeast of Katum.

On 23 April at 10:30 a unit of the 2nd Brigade, 1st Cavalry Division, found a munitions cache and nine graves 17 miles (27 km) east-northeast of Phước Bình. At 16:15 a helicopter gunship from the 1/9th cavalry received fire 24 miles (39 km) northeast of Tây Ninh and returned fire, killing six PAVN/VC. On 24 April at 19:30 a unit of the 3rd Brigade, 9th Infantry Division, operating 6 miles (9.7 km) north of Tân An engaged 10–15 PAVN/VC, the enemy withdrew after 30 minutes, leaving five dead. On 25 April at 03:00 helicopters from the 11th Aviation Group engaged an enemy force 22 miles (35 km) north-northeast of Phước Bình, the enemy withdrew after an hour, leaving seven dead. At 11:10 a helicopter gunship from the 11th ACR engaged an enemy platoon 10 miles (16 km) south of Phước Bình supported by artillery and airstrikes, the bodies of seven PAVN/VC were seen in the strike area. On 26 April at 09:45 a unit of the 3rd Brigade, 1st Cavalry Division, operating engaged an entrenched enemy force 12 miles (19 km) southwest of An Lộc, killing three; U.S. losses were two killed. At 23:15 a unit of the 1st brigade, 25th Infantry Division at Firebase Pine Ridge received mortar fire followed by a sapper attack. The defenders were supported by artillery, helicopter gunships and AC-47 and AC-119 gunships. The enemy withdrew after 30 minutes, leaving one dead and one individual weapon and 15 satchel charges; U.S. losses were four killed.

On 27 April at 10:30 a unit of the 2nd Brigade, 1st Cavalry Division, operating 13 miles (21 km) northeast of Phước Bình engaged an enemy unit, killing 21 and capturing four individual weapons; U.S. losses were three killed. At 12:40 a helicopter gunship from the 1/9th Cavalry received fire 30 miles (48 km) north-northwest of Tây Ninh and returned fire, killing six PAVN/VC. At 14:35 a unit of the 11th ACR engaged an enemy unit 30 miles north-northwest of Tây Ninh, the enemy withdrew after 40 minutes, leaving three dead and three individual weapons. At 15:35 a helicopter gunship from the 1/9th Cavalry received fire 32 miles (51 km) north-northwest of Tây Ninh and returned fire, killing seven PAVN/VC. At 18:10 helicopter gunships from the 1/9th Cavalry attacked 18 PAVN/VC 30 miles north-northwest of Tây Ninh and called in airstrikes on the area, 16 PAVN/VC and seven destroyed bunkers were seen in the strike area. A UH-1 was shot down 26 miles (42 km) northeast of Tây Ninh. An OH-6 was shot down 26 miles northeast of Tây Ninh. On 28 April at 07:55 a unit of the 2nd Brigade, 1st Cavalry Division, engaged an enemy unit 14 miles (23 km) northeast of Phước Bình, the enemy withdrew after 50 minutes, leaving 24 dead and three individual weapons.

On 29 April at 16:20, helicopters from the 1/9th Cavalry received fire 18 miles (29 km) northeast of Phước Bình and returned fire, killing seven PAVN/VC. At 18:10 a unit of the 1/9th Cavalry engaged an enemy force 11 miles (18 km) southwest of An Lộc supported by artillery and helicopter gunships. The enemy withdrew after one hour, leaving one dead and one crew-served weapon; U.S. losses were one killed. On 30 April at 07:55 a unit of the 199th LIB engaged an enemy platoon 19 miles (31 km) southeast of Biên Hòa; the enemy withdrew at 12:15, leaving nine dead. At 08:20 a unit of the 2nd Brigade, 1st Cavalry Division, engaged an enemy platoon 14 miles (23 km) northeast of Phước Bình supported by artillery, helicopter gunships and airstrikes, killing 24 PAVN/VC; U.S. losses were one killed. At 15:30 a unit of the 3rd Brigade, 1st Cavalry Division, found a munitions cache 21 miles (34 km) northeast of Tây Ninh containing 1,200 75 mm howitzer rounds, 10 RPG-2 grenades and one individual weapon. At 17:20 a unit of the 199th LIB engaged an enemy force 19 miles southeast of Biên Hòa; the enemy withdrew after 10 minutes, leaving seven dead and one individual weapon. A UH-1 medevac was shot down 15 miles (24 km) north of Hàm Tân, killing four on board. An OH-6 was shot down 12 miles (19 km) northwest of Tây Ninh.

== Aftermath ==
The operation concluded on 1 May 1970. 14,479 PAVN/VC were killed and 5,406 individual and 586 crew-served weapons captured. U.S. losses were 685 killed. With the start of the Cambodian Campaign on 29 April, all units involved in the operation moved their focus to the PAVN/VC base areas along the Cambodian–South Vietnamese border.
