= Deming Bronson =

US Army officer and Medal of Honor recipient (1894–1957)

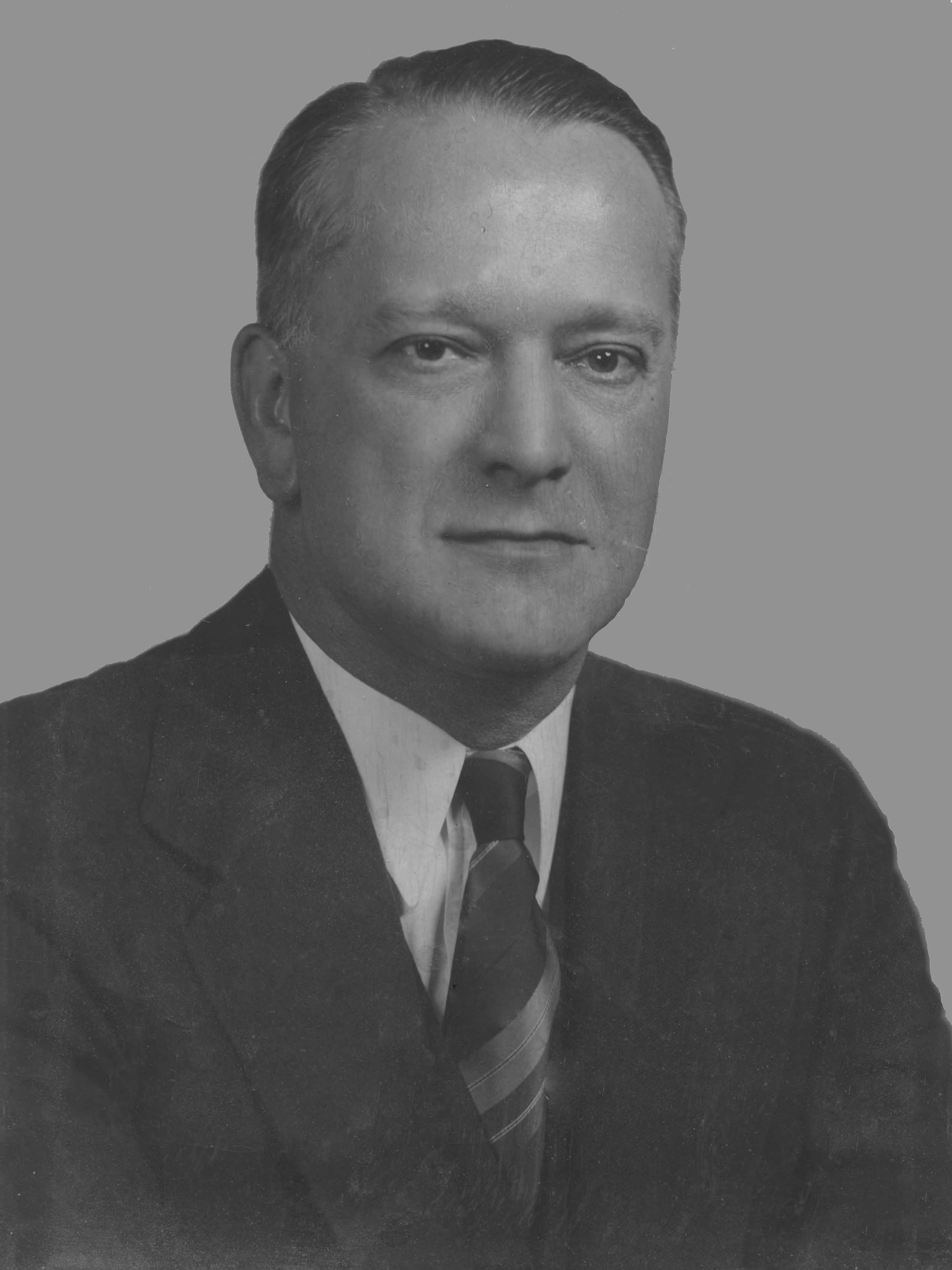
- Deming Bronson in 1941
- Born: July 8, 1894; Rhinelander, Wisconsin
- Died: May 29, 1957 (aged 62); Roseburg, Oregon
- Burial place: Arlington National Cemetery
- Spouse: Dorothy Elise Brown (m. 1925)
- Military career
- Allegiance: United States of America
- Branch: United States Army
- Service years: 1916–19?
- Rank: First Lieutenant
- Nickname: "Dick"
- Units: 364th Infantry Regiment, 91st Division
- Conflicts: World War I
- Awards: Medal of Honor

Deming Bronson (July 8, 1894 – May 29, 1957) was a United States Army officer who received the United States military's highest award, the Medal of Honor, for his actions in World War I.

Bronson was born on July 8, 1894, in Rhinelander, Wisconsin. He attended the University of Washington where he majored in forestry and from 1912 to 1916, played on the Washington Huskies football team. The University of Washington has erected a monument to commemorate eight alumni who have received the Medal Of Honor.

Bronson joined the Army from Seattle, Washington, and by September 26, 1918, was serving in France as a first lieutenant with Company H of the 364th Infantry Regiment, 91st Division. On the first day of the Meuse-Argonne Offensive, near the village of Eclisfontaine, he was wounded by a grenade but continued to fight and helped capture an enemy dugout. Shot in the arm later that day, he refused medical evacuation and remained with his unit through the night. The next morning, after joining a company which was on the front line of an attack, he assisted in the capture of Eclisfontaine and an enemy machine gun position. As the company withdrew, he was wounded a third time by an artillery shell, but again refused to be evacuated and remained with his men all night. Bronson recovered from his injuries and was awarded the Medal of Honor in the office of President Herbert Hoover on November 19, 1929. After the war, Bronson became an executive with a paint company in Ohio and New Jersey, and later worked in the family lumber business in Oregon.

He died May 29, 1957, and is buried at Arlington National Cemetery in Arlington, Virginia. His grave can be found in Section 30, Lot 500.

== Medal of Honor citation ==
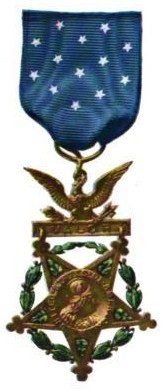

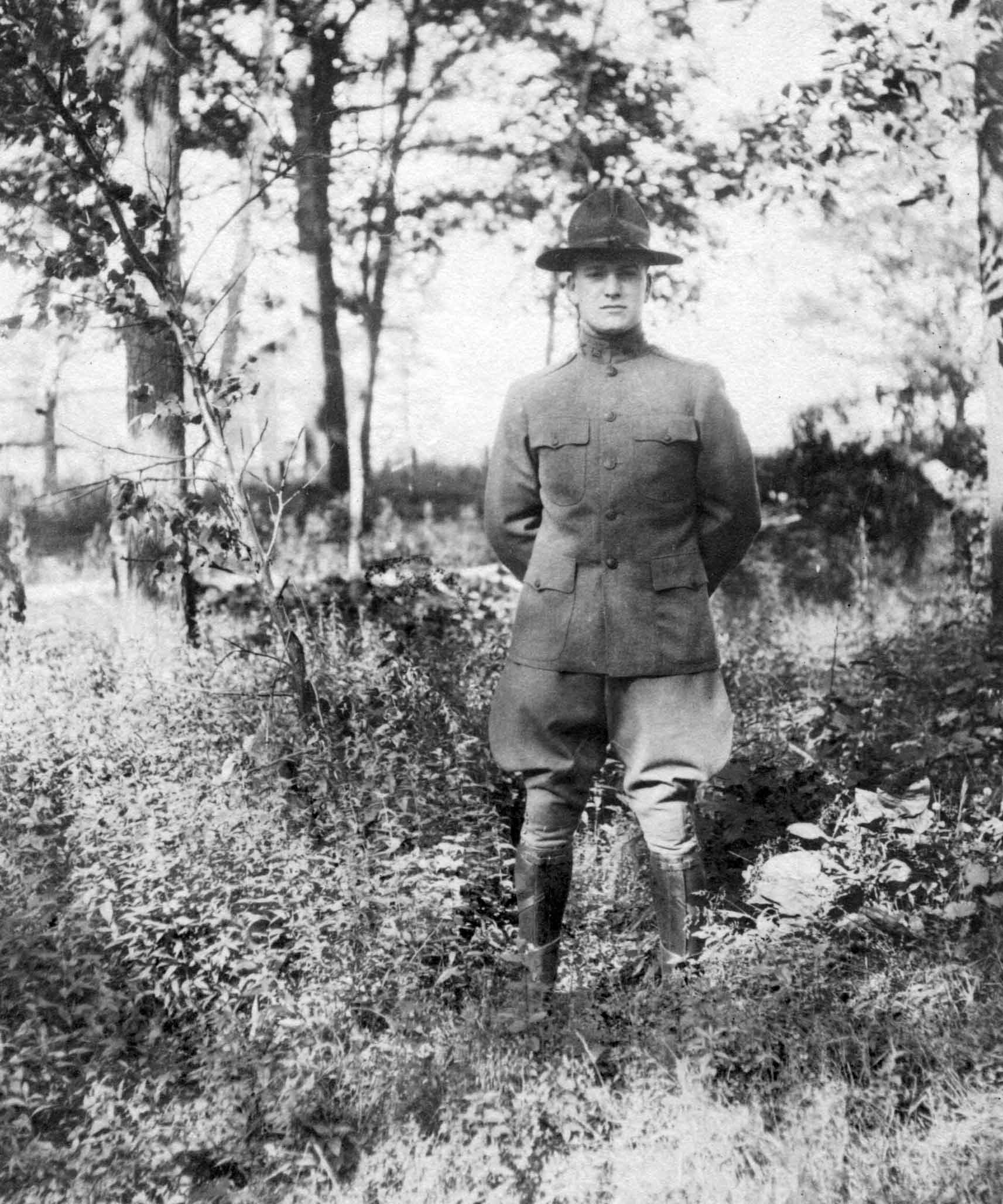
Bronson in 1917

For conspicuous gallantry and intrepidity above and beyond the call of duty in action with the enemy. On the morning of 26 September, during the advance of the 364th Infantry, 1st Lt. Bronson was struck by an exploding enemy handgrenade, receiving deep cuts on his face and the back of his head. He nevertheless participated in the action which resulted in the capture of an enemy dugout from which a great number of prisoners were taken. This was effected with difficulty and under extremely hazardous conditions because it was necessary to advance without the advantage of cover and, from an exposed position, throw hand grenades and phosphorus bombs to compel the enemy to surrender. On the afternoon of the same day he was painfully wounded in the left arm by an enemy rifle bullet, and after receiving first aid treatment he was directed to the rear. Disregarding these instructions, 1st Lt. Bronson remained on duty with his company through the night although suffering from severe pain and shock. On the morning of 27 September, his regiment resumed its attack, the object being the village of Eclisfontaine. Company H, to which 1st Lt. Bronson was assigned, was left in support of the attacking line, Company E being in the line. He gallantly joined that company in spite of his wounds and engaged with it in the capture of the village. After the capture he remained with Company E and participated with it in the capture of an enemy machinegun, he himself killing the enemy gunner. Shortly after this encounter the company was compelled to retire due to the heavy enemy artillery barrage. During this retirement 1st Lt. Bronson, who was the last man to leave the advanced position, was again wounded in both arms by an enemy high-explosive shell. He was then assisted to cover by another officer who applied first aid. Although bleeding profusely and faint from the loss of blood, 1st Lt. Bronson remained with the survivors of the company throughout the night of the second day, refusing to go to the rear for treatment. His conspicuous gallantry and spirit of self-sacrifice were a source of great inspiration to the members of the entire command.

=== University of Washington Medal of Honor Memorial ===
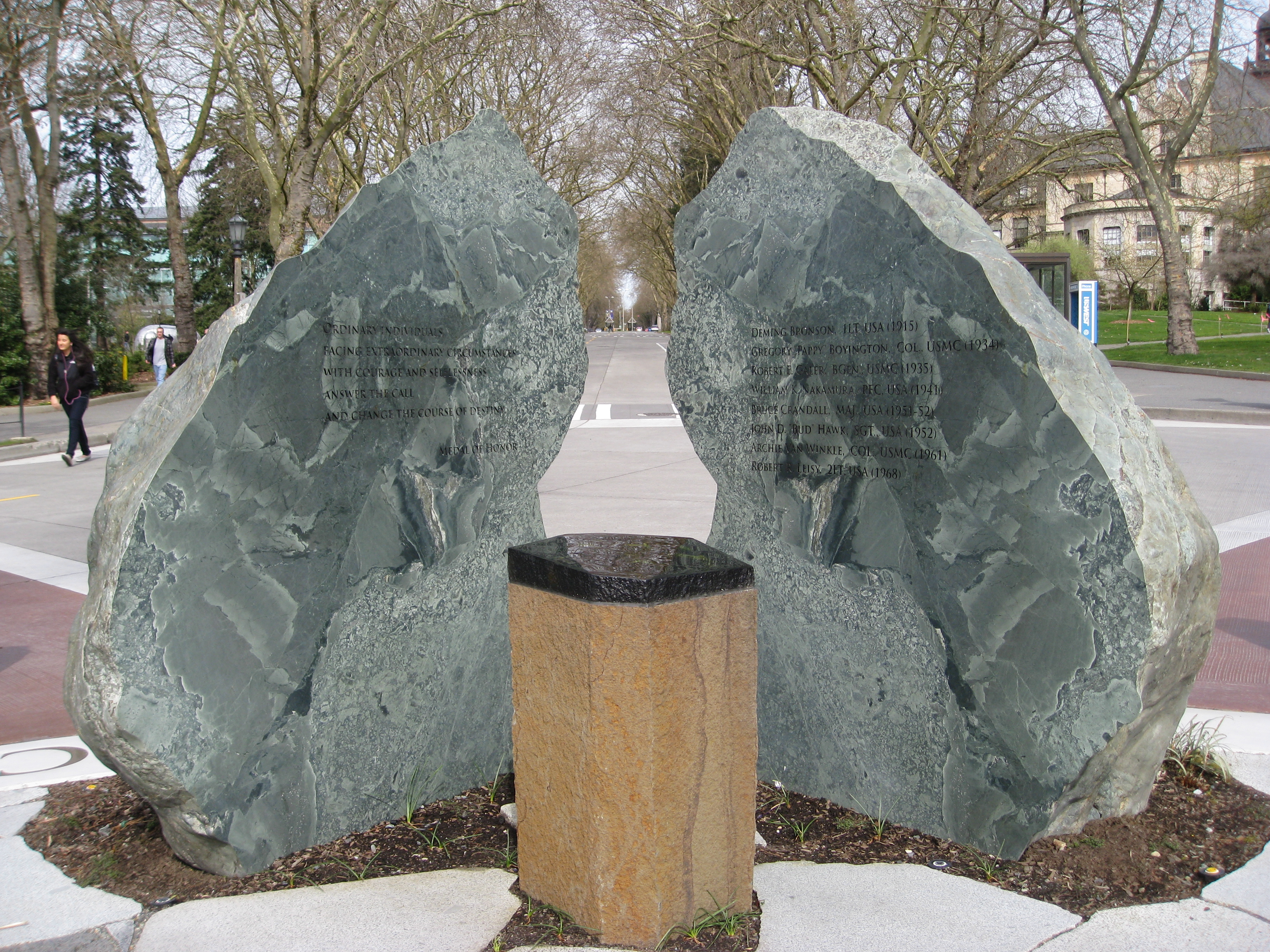
Medal of Honor memorial at the University of Washington

At the University of Washington in February 2006, a resolution recommending a memorial be erected to honor fighter ace and alumnus Pappy Boyington for his service during World War II was raised and defeated during a meeting of the student senate. Some people did not believe the resolution's sponsor had fully addressed the financial and logistical problems of installing a memorial, and some were questioning the widely held assumption that all warriors and acts of war are automatically worthy of memorialization.

The story was picked up by some blogs and conservative news outlets, focusing on two statements made by student senators during the meeting. One student senator, Ashley Miller, said that the UW already had many monuments to "rich, white men" (Boyington claimed partial Sioux ancestry and was not rich); another, Jill Edwards, questioned whether the UW should memorialize a person who killed others, summarized in the minutes as saying "she didn't believe a member of the Marine Corps was an example of the sort of person UW wanted to produce." After its defeat, a new version of the original resolution was submitted that called for a memorial to all eight UW alumni who received the Medal of Honor after attending the UW.

On April 4, 2006, the resolution passed by a vote of 64 to 14 with several abstentions, on a roll call vote. The University of Washington Medal of Honor memorial was constructed at the south end of Memorial Way (17th Ave NE), north of Red Square, in the interior of a traffic circle between Parrington and Kane Halls (47.6573°N 122.3097°W). Privately funded, it was completed in time for a Veterans Day dedication in November 2009. In addition to Greg Boyington, it honors Deming Bronson, Bruce Crandall, Robert Galer, John Hawk, Robert Leisy, William Nakamura, and Archie Van Winkle.

Ordinary individuals
facing extraordinary circumstances
with courage and selflessness
answer the call
and change the course of destiny.
Medal of Honor

== See also ==
- List of Medal of Honor recipients for World War I
