= Robert Ronald Leisy =

- Army Medal of Honor
- Born: March 1, 1945; Stockton, California, US
- Died: December 2, 1969 (aged 24); Phuoc Long Province, Republic of Vietnam
- Burial place: Evergreen-Washelli Memorial Park, Seattle, Washington
- Military career
- Allegiance: United States of America
- Branch: United States Army
- Service years: 1968–1969
- Rank: Second Lieutenant
- Nickname: "Bob"
- Units: 8th Cavalry Regiment, 1st Cavalry Division
- Conflicts: Vietnam War †
- Awards: Medal of Honor; Purple Heart

Robert Ronald Leisy (March 1, 1945 – December 2, 1969) was a United States Army officer and a recipient of the United States military's highest decoration—the Medal of Honor—for his actions in the Vietnam War.

== Biography ==
Leisy, from Seattle, Washington, was a University of Washington graduate, commissioned a second lieutenant through Army Infantry Officer Candidate School. By December 2, 1969, he was serving as a platoon leader in Company B, 1st Battalion, 8th Cavalry Regiment, 1st Cavalry Division. During a firefight on that day, in Phuoc Long Province, South Vietnam, during Operation Toan Thang IV he used his body to shield a fellow soldier from the blast of an incoming rocket-propelled grenade. Severely wounded, Leisy refused medical attention until others had been treated first. He succumbed to his wounds and was posthumously awarded the Medal of Honor for his actions.

Leisy, age 24 at his death, was buried in Evergreen-Washelli Memorial Park, Seattle, Washington.

== Medal of Honor citation ==
Second Lieutenant Leisy's official Medal of Honor citation reads:

For conspicuous gallantry and intrepidity in action at the risk of his life above and beyond the call of duty. 2d Lt. Leisy, Infantry, Company B, distinguished himself while serving as platoon leader during a reconnaissance mission. One of his patrols became heavily engaged by fire from a numerically superior enemy force located in a well-entrenched bunker complex. As 2d Lt. Leisy deployed the remainder of his platoon to rescue the beleaguered patrol, the platoon also came under intense enemy fire from the front and both flanks. In complete disregard for his safety, 2d Lt. Leisy moved from position to position deploying his men to effectively engage the enemy. Accompanied by his radio operator he moved to the front and spotted an enemy sniper in a tree in the act of firing a rocket-propelled grenade at them. Realizing there was neither time to escape the grenade nor shout a warning, 2d Lt. Leisy unhesitatingly, and with full knowledge of the consequences, shielded the radio operator with his body and absorbed the full impact of the explosion. This valorous act saved the life of the radio operator and protected other men of his platoon who were nearby from serious injury. Despite his mortal wounds, 2d Lt. Leisy calmly and confidently continued to direct the platoon's fire. When medical aid arrived, 2d Lt. Leisy valiantly refused attention until the other seriously wounded were treated. His display of extraordinary courage and exemplary devotion to duty provided the inspiration and leadership that enabled his platoon to successfully withdraw without further casualties. 2d Lt. Leisy's gallantry at the cost of his life are in keeping with the highest traditions of the military service and reflect great credit on him, his unit, and the U.S. Army.

== University of Washington Medal of Honor Memorial ==
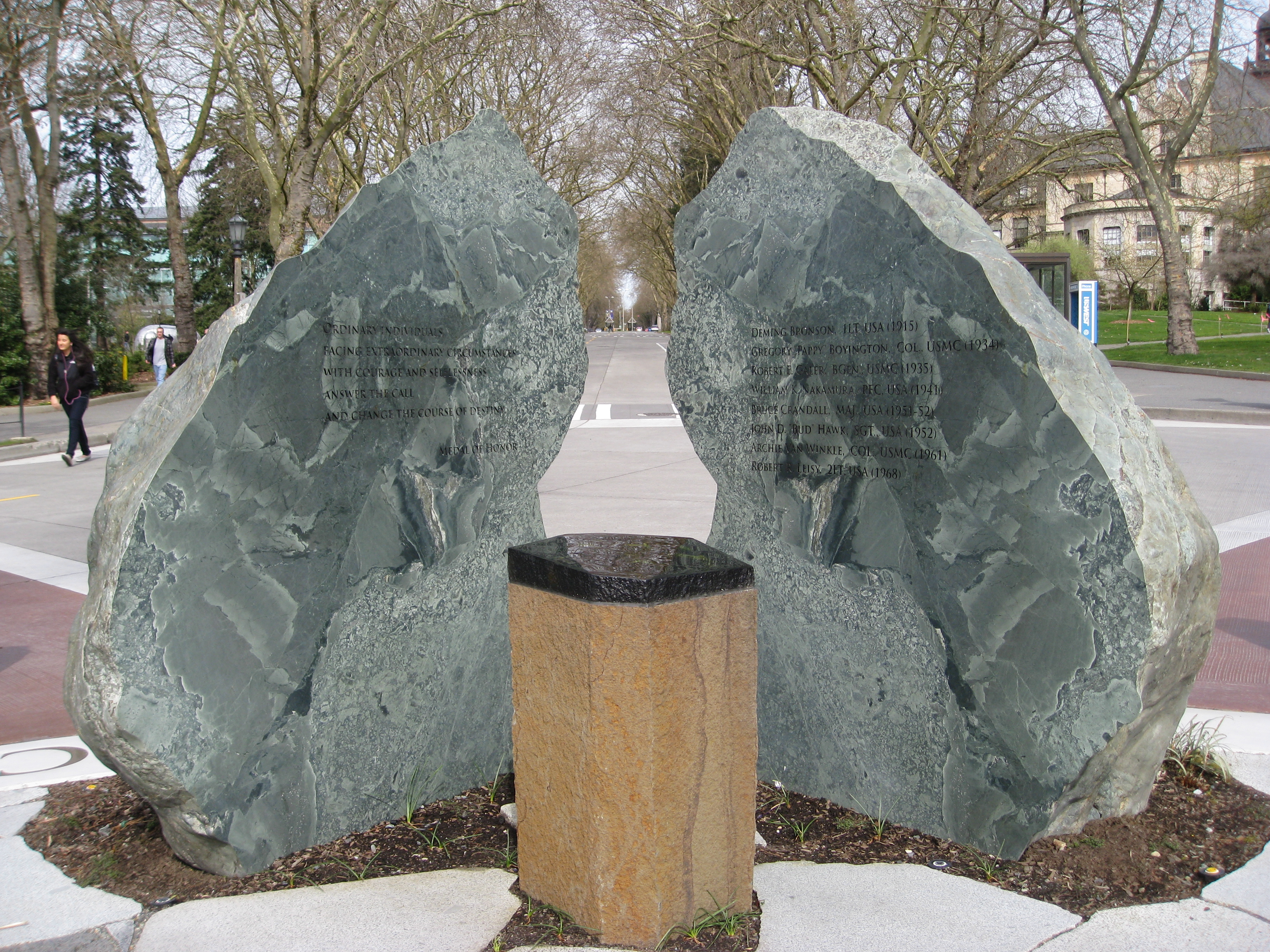
Medal of Honor memorial at the University of Washington

At the University of Washington in February 2006, a resolution recommending a memorial be erected to honor fighter ace and alumnus Pappy Boyington for his service during World War II was raised and defeated during a meeting of the student senate. Some people did not believe the resolution's sponsor had fully addressed the financial and logistical problems of installing a memorial, and some were questioning the widely held assumption that all warriors and acts of war are automatically worthy of memorialization. The story was picked up by some blogs and conservative news outlets, focusing on two statements made by student senators during the meeting. One student senator, Ashley Miller, said that the UW already had many monuments to "rich, white men" (Boyington claimed partial Sioux ancestry and was not rich); another, Jill Edwards, questioned whether the UW should memorialize a person who killed others, summarized in the minutes as saying "she didn't believe a member of the Marine Corps was an example of the sort of person UW wanted to produce."

After its defeat, a new version of the original resolution was submitted that called for a memorial to all eight UW alumni who received the Medal of Honor after attending the UW. On April 4, 2006, the resolution passed by a vote of 64 to 14 with several abstentions, on a roll call vote. The University of Washington Medal of Honor memorial was constructed at the south end of Memorial Way (17th Ave NE), north of Red Square, in the interior of a traffic circle between Parrington and Kane Halls (47.6573°N 122.3097°W). Privately funded, it was completed in time for a Veterans Day dedication in November 2009. In addition to Greg Boyington, it honors Deming Bronson, Bruce Crandall, Robert Galer, John Hawk, Robert Leisy, William Nakamura, and Archie Van Winkle.

Ordinary individuals
facing extraordinary circumstances
with courage and selflessness
answer the call
and change the course of destiny.
Medal of Honor

== See also ==
- List of Medal of Honor recipients
- List of Medal of Honor recipients for the Vietnam War
