= Wesley L. Fox =

United States Marine Corps Medal of Honor recipient (1931–2017)

Wesley Lee Fox
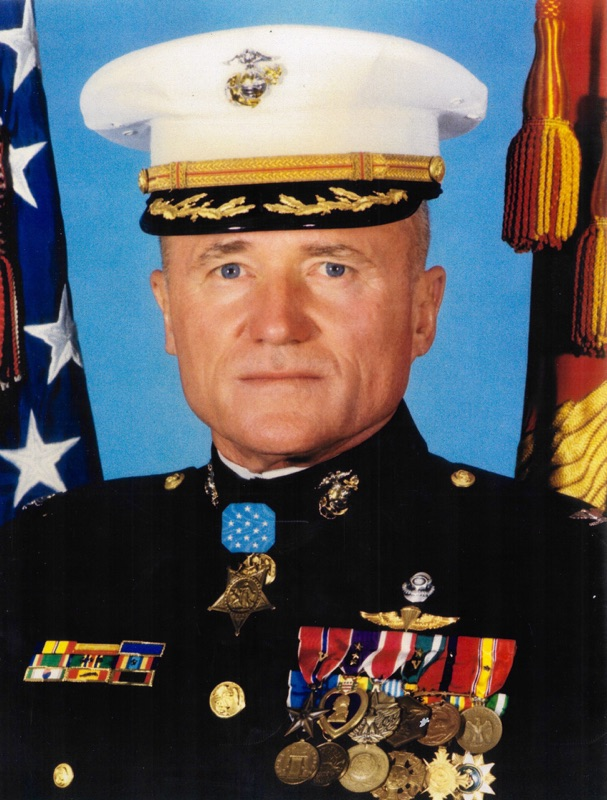
- Colonel Wesley L. Fox, U.S. Marine Corps
- Born: September 30, 1931; Herndon, Virginia, US
- Died: November 24, 2017 (aged 86); Blacksburg, Virginia, US
- Burial place: Arlington National Cemetery, Arlington, Virginia
- Military career
- Allegiance: United States of America
- Branch: United States Marine Corps
- Service years: 1950–1993
- Rank: Colonel
- Units: 3rd Battalion, 5th Marines; 1st Battalion, 9th Marines; MAG-11; MCRD San Diego; 2nd Force Reconnaissance Company; Marine Air Detachment; SHAPE; Basic School, Quantico
- Commands: Company A, 1st Battalion, 9th Marines; Battalion Commander, 1st Battalion, 6th Marines, Commanding officer, U.S. Marine Corps Officer Candidate School, Quantico, Virginia
- Conflicts: Korean War; Vietnam War
- Awards: Medal of Honor; Legion of Merit (2); Bronze Star Medal with Combat "V"; Purple Heart (4)
- Other work: Deputy Commandant of Cadets at Virginia Tech; Marine Corps Recruiter author

Wesley Lee Fox (September 30, 1931 – November 24, 2017) was a highly decorated United States Marine Corps colonel with 43 years of service. Fox was a combat veteran – receiving the Medal of Honor for his heroic actions during the Vietnam War – and is considered one of the Marine Corps' legendary heroes. After retiring from the Marine Corps, he wrote a book about his career: Marine Rifleman: Forty-Three Years in the Corps; and, he served for 8 years as deputy commandant for the Virginia Tech Corps of Cadets.

== Early years ==
Wesley Lee Fox was born on September 30, 1931, to John Wesley and Desola Lee (née Crouch) Fox on a farm outside of Herndon, Virginia, the oldest of ten siblings. He attended Warren County High School in Front Royal, Virginia until 1946, quitting school after the eighth grade, intending to be a farmer.

== Marine Corps service ==
=== Korean War ===
When the Korean War began, inspired by the military service of his cousins in World War II, Fox enlisted in the Marine Corps on August 4, 1950, shortly before his 19th birthday. He intended to serve for four years and then return to the farm. He completed recruit training at Marine Corps Recruit Depot, Parris Island, South Carolina in October 1950. After a brief tour as a rifleman with the 2nd Marine Division at Marine Corps Base, Camp Lejeune, North Carolina, he was sent to Korea.

His first tour to Korea began in January 1951, serving as a rifleman with Company I, 3rd Battalion, 5th Marines. In March 1951, he was promoted to corporal. He was wounded in action in Korea on September 8, 1951, and sent to the National Naval Medical Center in Bethesda, Maryland, and was awarded the Bronze Star Medal with Combat "V".

He recovered and was released from Bethesda in March 1952, he served with the Armed Forces Police, in Washington, D.C., as a patrolman until September 1953 when he was reassigned to Marine Aircraft Group 11 in Japan.

=== 1954 - 1967 ===
In 1954, with the war in Korea over, he re-enlisted for six years. and was returned to Korea for his second tour, as a platoon sergeant with Company G, 3rd Battalion, 5th Marines. When he returned to the United States, he served briefly at the Marine Corps Base, Camp Pendleton, California, prior to being assigned to Drill Instructors School at Marine Corps Recruit Depot San Diego, California, where he completed the course of instruction in August 1955.

Completing his course of instruction in August 1955, he remained at San Diego serving as a drill instructor until August 1957 when he once again returned to the East Coast to attend Recruiter's School at Marine Corps Recruit Depot Parris Island, South Carolina, subsequent to being assigned duty as a recruiter in the Washington, D.C., and the Baltimore, Maryland areas from 1957 to December 1960.

In December 1960, Fox was ordered back to the West Coast and served as a platoon sergeant with the 1st Force Reconnaissance Company at both Camp Pendleton, California, and on Okinawa through November 1962. In December 1962, he was assigned as a troop handler at the Marine Air Detachment, in Jacksonville, Florida, and served in this capacity until September 1965. Gunnery Sergeant Fox next saw duty in the Office of the Provost Marshal, Supreme Headquarters Allied Powers Europe (SHAPE) in Paris, France.

In May 1966, he was promoted briefly to first sergeant, and shortly afterwards, he was commissioned as a Marine second lieutenant by Brigadier General John W. Antonelli on 27 May 1966. Returning to the United States in August of that year, he became a platoon commander with the 2d Force Reconnaissance Company at Camp Lejeune, North Carolina.

=== Vietnam War ===
Beginning in September 1967, Fox served in the Vietnam War for 13 months as an executive officer of a South Vietnamese Marine Battalion. In November 1968, he was reassigned to Vietnam as the company commander of Company A, 1st Battalion, 9th Marines until May 1969. On February 22, 1969, during Operation Dewey Canyon in Quang Tri Province, he was wounded twice. He was wounded the first time in the shoulder when his company was attacked by a large enemy force. A first lieutenant at the time, Fox then personally neutralized one enemy emplacement and directed his company to destroy the enemy. After his company's executive officer was mortally wounded, he continued to direct the company's actions, ordering air strikes and coordinating the advance until the enemy retreated; Fox, the only officer left in his company still capable of resisting the enemy, was wounded again in the final assault, but refused medical attention while he reorganized his troops and prepared the wounded for evacuation. Fox was later promoted to captain on 1 April 1969. For his heroic actions, he was awarded the Medal of Honor by President Richard Nixon on March 2, 1971.

== Post-Vietnam ==
Fox graduated from Amphibious Warfare School at Marine Corps Base Quantico in 1970 followed by assignment as tactics instructor at the Basic School. He later served duty with Marine Security Guards in Europe and then later as training officer, 2nd Marine Division. As a major, Fox served a tour in Okinawa with 3rd Recon Battalion, then was assigned as Reconnaissance Officer in the Marine Corps Development Center. As a lieutenant colonel, Fox assumed command of 1st Battalion, 6th Marines from June 1982 to July 1983. Fox graduated from the Army War College at Carlisle, Pennsylvania and was next assigned as Fleet Marine Officer Second Fleet aboard USS Mount Whitney for two years. His final assignment was as the commanding officer of Marine Officer Candidate School.

== Post-Marine Corps ==
Fox retired from the Marine Corps as a colonel on 1 September 1993 at the mandatory age of 62. Fox was one of the very few servicemembers that fought in the Korean War who was still on active duty during the Gulf War. He continued to wear the uniform for eight more years as a deputy commandant of cadets for the Virginia Tech Corps of Cadets. During and following his time as a deputy commandant, Fox was a regular guest speaker at Virginia Tech, sharing his experiences with America's next generation of military officers, business executives, and civic leaders.

In 2002, Fox wrote a book about his experiences in the military, Marine Rifleman: Forty-Three Years in the Corps and was featured on the 2003 PBS program American Valor. In 2011, he wrote a second book, Six Essential Elements of Leadership: Marine Corps Wisdom from a Medal of Honor Recipient, which is required reading for first year cadets at Virginia Tech.

Fox resided in Blacksburg, Virginia, with his wife, Dotti (formerly Dotti Lu Bossinger). They have three daughters. He died in Blacksburg on the evening of November 24, 2017, and was buried at Arlington National Cemetery.

== Military awards ==
Fox's military decorations and awards included:

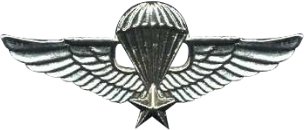

Scuba Diver Insignia
Navy and Marine Corps Parachutist Insignia
Republic of Vietnam Parachutist Badge
1st Row		Medal of Honor	Legion of Merit w/ one 5/16" Gold Star	
2nd Row	Bronze Star Medal w/ Combat "V"	Purple Heart w/ three 5/16" Gold Stars	Meritorious Service Medal	Joint Service Commendation Medal
3rd Row	Navy and Marine Corps Commendation Medal w/ Combat "V" and 5/16" Gold Star	Combat Action Ribbon w/ one 5/16" Gold Star	Navy Presidential Unit Citation	Army Presidential Unit Citation
4th Row	Navy Unit Commendation	Navy Meritorious Unit Commendation w/ four 3/16" Bronze Stars	Marine Corps Good Conduct Medal w/ four 3/16" Bronze Stars	National Defense Service Medal w/ two 3/16" Bronze Stars
5th Row	Korean Service Medal w/ three 3/16" Bronze Stars	Vietnam Service Medal w/ one 3/16" Silver Star and one 3/16" Bronze Star	Navy Sea Service Deployment Ribbon w/ three 3/16" Bronze Stars	Navy Arctic Service Ribbon
6th Row	Republic of Vietnam Gallantry Cross w/ two 5/16" Silver Stars	Armed Forces Honor Medal, 1st class (Vietnam)	Republic of Korea Presidential Unit Citation	Republic of Vietnam Meritorious Unit Citation (Gallantry Cross) w/ Palm and Frame
7th Row	Republic of Vietnam Meritorious Unit Citation (Civil Actions) w/ Palm and Frame	United Nations Korea Medal	Republic of Vietnam Campaign Medal w/ 1960- Device	Republic of Korea War Service Medal

- Marine Corps Rifle Expert Badge
- Marine Corps Pistol Expert Badge

=== Medal of Honor citation ===
The President of the United States in the name of The Congress takes pleasure in presenting the MEDAL OF HONOR to

CAPTAIN WESLEY L. FOX
UNITED STATES MARINE CORPS

for service as set forth in the following CITATION:

For conspicuous gallantry and intrepidity at the risk of his life above and beyond the call of duty while serving as commanding officer of Company A, in action against the enemy in the northern A Shau Valley. Capt. (then 1st Lt.) Fox's company came under intense fire from a large well concealed enemy force. Capt. Fox maneuvered to a position from which he could assess the situation and confer with his platoon leaders. As they departed to execute the plan he had devised, the enemy attacked and Capt. Fox was wounded along with all of the other members of the command group, except the executive officer. Capt. Fox continued to direct the activity of his company. Advancing through heavy enemy fire, he personally neutralized 1 enemy position and calmly ordered an assault against the hostile emplacements. He then moved through the hazardous area coordinating aircraft support with the activities of his men. When his executive officer was mortally wounded, Capt. Fox reorganized the company and directed the fire of his men as they hurled grenades against the enemy and drove the hostile forces into retreat. Wounded again in the final assault, Capt. Fox refused medical attention, established a defensive posture, and supervised the preparation of casualties for medical evacuation. His indomitable courage, inspiring initiative, and unwavering devotion to duty in the face of grave personal danger inspired his Marines to such aggressive action that they overcame all enemy resistance and destroyed a large bunker complex. Capt. Fox's heroic actions reflect great credit upon himself and the Marine Corps, and uphold the highest traditions of the U.S. Naval Service.

/S/ Richard M. Nixon

== See also ==
- List of Medal of Honor recipients for the Vietnam War
