= Stanley J. Wawrzyniak =

American Marine Corps Navy Cross recipient

- Nickname: "Ski"
- Born: October 7, 1927; Gary, West Virginia, US
- Died: October 26, 1995 (aged 68) North Carolina, US
- Buried: Coastal Carolina State Veterans Cemetery; Jacksonville, North Carolina
- Allegiance: United States
- Branch: United States Navy (1944–1946); United States Marine Corps (1946–1981)
- Rank: Lieutenant Colonel
- Conflicts: World War II; Chinese Civil War: Operation Beleaguer; Korean War: Battle of Inchon; Battle of the Punchbowl; Vietnam War
- Awards: Navy Cross (2); Silver Star; Bronze Star w/ Combat "V" (2); Purple Heart (4)

Stanley J. Wawrzyniak (October 7, 1927 – October 26, 1995) was a highly decorated United States Marine Corps officer. He was a recipient of two Navy Crosses, the United States military's second-highest decoration for valor in combat.

== Early life and service ==
Stanley J. Wawrzyniak was born on October 7, 1927, in Gary, West Virginia. In October of 1944, then 17-year old Wawrzyniak dropped out of high school and enlisted in the United States Navy in Buffalo, New York. He served for 23 months before he was discharged as a boilermaker third class in September 1946.

Three days after his discharge, Wawrzyniak enlisted in the Marine Corps. He deployed overseas to China during the occupation in the late 1940s.

== Korean War ==
In 1950, Staff Sergeant Wawrzyniak deployed to Korea, where he was assigned to the 2nd Battalion, 5th Marines, 1st Marine Division. He would serve two back-to-back tours of duty in Korea. He first saw combat during the landing at Inchon.

On May 28, 1951, he voluntarily accompanied a rifle platoon during an assault on a heavily fortified enemy position. As Wawrzyniak was encouraging the Marines to advance, he was wounded. Refusing first aid, he successfully supervised the evacuation of all of the wounded. For his actions that day, Wawrzyniak was awarded the Silver Star.

During the battle of the Punchbowl on September 19, 1951, Staff Sergeant Wawrzyniak again volunteered to join the leading assault squad during his company’s final assault against a heavily fortified enemy-held hill. Under heavy fire, Wawrzyniak pointed out targets and encouraged Marines during the assault. As the squad reached the top of the hill, Wawrzyniak single-handedly charged a position on the left flank. Although he was wounded by a grenade, he succeeded in killing three of the enemy. Staff Sergeant Wawrzyniak then acquired a Browning Automatic Rifle and rejoined the squad in clearing out more enemy positions. For his actions during the assault, Wawrzyniak was promoted to technical sergeant and was awarded his first Navy Cross.

On April 16, 1952, Technical Sergeant Wawrzyniak was a member of an outpost which was attacked by a superior enemy force. Wawrzyniak, assuming command when the outpost commander was cut off, quickly organized a successful defense. Under heavy machine gun and mortar fire, Technical Sergeant Wawrzyniak repeatedly led cut-off groups of Marines in the outpost back to the defensive perimeter he had established. He continued to encourage his men in repelling numerous enemy assaults. Despite being badly wounded, Wawrzyniak refused medical treatment and instead helped treat other wounded Marines. Wawrzyniak was awarded his second Navy Cross for his actions that day.

== Post-Korean War ==
After the war, Wawrzyniak returned to the United States and was promoted to master sergeant. While at Camp Lejeune, North Carolina, he was commissioned as a second lieutenant after encouragement from Major General Randolph Pate.

Wawrzyniak attended Underwater Demolition Training and the Mountain Leadership Training Course at the Mountain Warfare Training Center. In one incident, he broke his spine when he fell into a crevasse. Refusing morphine, he walked off the mountain without assistance.

Wawrzyniak finished at the top of his class in the Army Airborne and Army Ranger Schools. He also finished at the top of his class in Evasion, Escape, and Survival School.

== Vietnam and later life ==
In July 1965, Major Wawrzyniak deployed to South Vietnam and was attached to the 3rd Battalion, 3rd Marines, 3rd Marine Division. Wawrzyniak was wounded by mortar fire on March 25, 1967, during Operation Prairie III. He was awarded two Bronze Stars during his time in Vietnam.

Wawrzyniak left the Marine Corps as a lieutenant colonel after 35 years of service. Settling in Swansboro, North Carolina, Wawrzyniak started to build homes with two of his sons. Stanley J. Wawrzyniak died of a heart attack on October 26, 1995, and was buried at Coastal Carolina State Veterans Cemetery in Jacksonville, North Carolina.

In 2011, more than 15 years after his death, Wawrzyniak became the second Marine to be inducted into the US Army Ranger Hall of Fame.

== See also ==
- List of Navy Cross recipients for the Korean War
- John Ripley
- Harold S. Roise
