= Allan Sutter =

United States Marine Corps officer (1914–1988)

- Born: June 14, 1914; Mount Holly, New Jersey, US
- Died: July 12, 1988 (aged 74) Orange, Virginia, US
- Buried: Quantico National Cemetery
- Allegiance: United States
- Branch: United States Marine Corps
- Service years: 1937–1964
- Rank: Colonel
- Commands: 2nd Battalion, 1st Marines; 4th Marine Regiment
- Conflicts: World War II; Guadalcanal campaign; Battle of Guam (1944); Battle of Okinawa; Operation Beleaguer; Korean War; Battle of Inchon; Second Battle of Seoul; Battle of Chosin Reservoir
- Awards: Navy Cross; Legion of Merit; Bronze Star

Allan Sutter (June 14, 1914 – July 12, 1988) was a highly decorated United States Marine Corps colonel. He was awarded the Navy Cross at the battle of Chosin Reservoir during the Korean War.

== Early life and World War II ==
Allan Sutter was born on June 14, 1914, in Mount Holly, New Jersey. After graduating from Valley Forge Military Academy, Sutter attended Dartmouth College and graduated with a bachelor's degree in 1937. He then completed the Platoon Leader Program at Marine Corps Base Quantico, Virginia in July and was commissioned as a second lieutenant in the Marine Corps.

Sutter received additional training at The Basic School in Philadelphia, Pennsylvania. His first assignment was as the assistant communications officer in the 5th Marine Regiment. He then attended Communications Officers School at Fort Monmouth, New Jersey, before he served as the aide to the commanding general of the 1st Marine Division.

Sutter led the 1st Signal Company during the battle of Guadalcanal from August to December 1942. He later served as the executive officer of the III Amphibious Corps Signal Battalion during the battle of Guam in July and August 1944, and during the battle of Okinawa from April to June 1945. Sutter participated in the occupation of Northern China after the war, returning to the United States in 1946.

== Korean War ==
=== Inchon-Seoul campaign ===
When the Korean War started, Lieutenant Colonel Sutter was given command of 2nd Battalion, 1st Marines. Sutter led his battalion during the amphibious assault at Blue Beach One at Inchon on September 15, 1950. His first wave of Marines landed at 1730 hours, followed shortly after by a second wave. However, the next three waves from his battalion drifted off course and mistakenly landed on Blue Beach Three.

By the afternoon of September 16, Sutter's battalion had pushed two miles inland and had taken Hill 117 which overlooked the highway toward Seoul. Later that night, his battalion helped repel a North Korean counterattack. Early on the morning of September 20, his battalion destroyed another enemy counterattack which was composed of five tanks and 300 men outside of Yongdung-po. Private First Class Walter C. Monegan Jr. personally destroyed two T-34s before he was killed. Later that day, Sutter requested an artillery fire mission which took seven hours to be approved.

On the morning of September 21, Sutter's battalion took particularly heavy casualties while attacking Yongdung-po. After reaching the Han River outside of Seoul on September 22, his battalion was placed in the regimental reserve. 2/1 had sustained 116 casualties as a result of seven days of aggressively assaulting "without the required artillery preparation."

On September 26, Sutter continued to lead 2/1 in urban combat during the recapture of Seoul. The house-to-house fighting was agonizingly slow for the Marines, who would typically spend one hour clearing each position. While the city was effectively secured by September 28, there were still enemy pockets of resistance for the next few days. On September 29, an observation post occupied by Company E on Hill 132 was attacked by approximately 100 of the enemy. Private First Class Stanley R. Christianson remained in a listening post where he personally killed seven of the enemy before he himself was killed and bought time for his platoon to mount a defense which repelled the attack.

=== Chosin Reservoir campaign ===
At the conclusion of the Inchon-Seoul campaign in the first week of October, the entire 1st Marine Division embarked on Navy ships and sailed around South Korea and landed at Wonsan on October 26. The division then marched 70 miles north to the Chosin Reservoir area. As Sutter's battalion arrived at Koto-ri on November 24, the Chinese Communist military encircled the entire division and the coldest winter in 50 years descended on Korea. Temperatures fell as low as −35 °F as a blizzard swept the area.

On the night of November 29, a large enemy force assaulted 2/1's entrenched position outside of Koto-ri. Lieutenant Colonel Sutter skillfully directed his Marines in repulsing the attack, killing 175 of the enemy and wounding several hundred more. On December 10, Sutter led his Marines in an attack toward Sudong-ni. He attained his objective with minimal losses despite suffering from a fever. The Marines reached Hungnam by December 11 and were evacuated by ships by December 24. For his actions during the Chosin Reservoir campaign, Sutter was awarded the Navy Cross.

Sutter continued serving in Korea and eventually became the executive officer of the 1st Marine Regiment. He returned to the United States in May 1951 and was awarded the Legion of Merit for his service.

== Later career and life ==
After the war, Sutter served as the Assistant Chief of Staff, G-3 for the Fleet Marine Force, Pacific. From August 1961 to June 1962, he served as the commanding officer of the 4th Marine Regiment, 1st Marine Expeditionary Brigade, at Kaneohe Bay, Hawaii.

Colonel Sutter retired from the Marines in 1964. He died on July 12, 1988, in Orange, Virginia.

== See also ==
- List of Navy Cross recipients for the Korean War

Military offices
Preceded by John W. Antonelli	Commanding Officer of the 4th Marine Regiment; August 1, 1961 – June 5, 1962	Succeeded by William H. Marsh
