= James F. Lawrence Jr. =

United States Marine Corps general (1918–2006)

- Born: March 17, 1918; Rutledge, Tennessee, US
- Died: September 18, 2006 (aged 88); Bethesda, Maryland, US
- Burial place: Arlington National Cemetery
- Military career
- Allegiance: United States
- Branch: United States Marine Corps
- Service years: 1941–1972
- Rank: Brigadier General
- Conflicts: World War II; Guadalcanal campaign; Battle of Cape Gloucester; Occupation of Japan; Operation Beleaguer; Korean War; Battle of Inchon; Second Battle of Seoul; Battle of Chosin Reservoir; Vietnam War
- Awards: Navy Cross; Navy Distinguished Service Medal (2); Bronze Star w/ Combat "V" (2); Purple Heart

James Fugate Lawrence Jr. (March 17, 1918 – September 18, 2006) was a highly decorated United States Marine Corps brigadier general. He was awarded the Navy Cross during the Korean War and later became the first Marine lawyer general officer.

== Early life and career ==
James F. Lawrence was born on March 17, 1918, in Rutledge, Tennessee. Upon graduating from the University of North Carolina at Chapel Hill in 1941, he enlisted in the Marine Corps.

Lawrence was assigned as a platoon leader in the 1st Marine Division during World War II. He took part in the Guadalcanal campaign in 1942, and after liberty in Australia, he led his platoon in the battle of Cape Gloucester in December 1943. Lawrence returned to the United States in 1944 with several awards including the Bronze Star and the Purple Heart.

Lawrence then briefly took Asian studies and Japanese language courses at Yale University. He then took part in the occupations of Japan and China for three years following the end of World War II.

== Korean War ==
When the Korean War started, Major Lawrence was assigned to the 2nd Battalion, 7th Marines, 1st Marine Division as the operations officer. He took part in the amphibious assault at Inchon and the subsequent recapture of Seoul in September 1950.

At the conclusion of the Inchon-Seoul campaign, the entire 1st Marine Division embarked on Navy ships and sailed around South Korea, landing at Wonsan in October. The division then marched 70 miles north to the Chosin Reservoir area. As the Marines arrived at the Chosin Reservoir, the Chinese Communist military encircled the entire division and the coldest winter in 50 years descended on Korea. Temperatures fell as low as −35 °F as a blizzard swept the area.

By late November, the Marines were forced to fight their way through the Chinese in order to withdraw to the south. During the withdrawal from Hagaru-ri to Koto-ri, Major Lawrence's battalion was assigned as the division vanguard. On December 6, Lawrence voluntarily led a small group behind the forward assault platoon, despite continuous enemy fire and shells which exploded in close proximity to him, in order to coordinate the advance and direct fire. During the first four miles of the advance, Lawrence effectively directed the destruction of three Chinese roadblocks.

Major Lawrence's battalion commander succumbed to combat fatigue and the executive officer was seriously wounded, leaving Lawrence as the senior Marine officer. He unhesitatingly took command of his battalion and led his Marines in smashing through the last roadblocks outside of Koto-ri for the next few hours. Lawrence then led his Marines back to continue fighting and assist the rest of the division in reaching Koto-ri. For his bravery during the battle, Lawrence was awarded the Navy Cross and a second Bronze Star.

== Later Marine Corps career ==
After returning to the United States, Lawrence attended law school at George Washington University. Upon graduating in 1953, he served as a legal advisor to the Commandant at Marine Corps Base Quantico, Virginia. Lawrence was then assigned to Marine Forces Pacific as a senior legal officer.

In May 1967, Lawrence became the first Marine lawyer to be promoted to brigadier general. He was then given a nonlegal assignment as the Deputy Assistant to the Secretary of Defense for Legislative Affairs, which included being The Pentagon's primary liaison with Congress. The Office of the Secretary of Defense would not release Lawrence from his position despite Headquarters Marine Corps' efforts to have Lawrence command the Judge Advocate Division.

Brigadier General Lawrence retired from the Marines in November 1968. However, he was recalled to active duty to continue serving as the Deputy Assistant before he retired a second time in 1972. Lawrence was awarded two Navy Distinguished Service Medals for his services as the Deputy Assistant.

== Post-Marine career and life ==
For the next 20 years following his retirement, Lawrence continued to practice law in Springfield, Virginia. In 1979, he helped found the Marine Corps Heritage Foundation. James F. Lawrence died of pneumonia on September 18, 2006, at the National Naval Medical Center in Bethesda, Maryland. He was buried in Arlington National Cemetery.

== See also ==
- List of Navy Cross recipients for the Korean War
