= Duty to escape =

Military requirement

The Code of the United States Fighting Force, which applies to serving U.S. military personnel, outlines the duty to escape in article III

A duty to escape is a requirement that military personnel attempt to escape from captivity if taken prisoner of war. It is referred to in Second World War prisoner of war films including 1963's The Great Escape but was not actually a duty imposed on British officers at the time. The duty was formally applied to U.S. military personnel as article III of the 1955 Code of the United States Fighting Force, which remains in effect.

== Background ==
A duty to escape is a requirement for service personnel, particularly officers, to attempt to escape back to their own lines if taken prisoner of war by enemy forces. One of the earlier references to this is in 1891 when France prohibited its officers from giving their parole. Parole was an arrangement whereby the officers would be granted their additional privileges or freedoms in exchange for promising not to attempt to escape or take up arms against their captors. In this instance the prohibition of parole was not intended to maintain the officer's duty to escape but to ensure that they remained with and cared for their captured men.

== Second World War ==
Colonel Von Luger, it is the sworn duty of all officers to try to escape. If they cannot escape, then it is their sworn duty to cause the enemy to use an inordinate number of troops to guard them, and their sworn duty to harass the enemy to the best of their ability.

— Group Captain Ramsey (James Donald), senior British officer at the prisoner of war camp in The Great Escape (1963), addressing the German commandant.

The duty to escape is often referred to in Second World War prisoner of war literature and films, however British historian Guy Walters says this is an "enduring myth". There was never an official duty for service personnel to try to escape captivity, though there might have been an unofficial expectation that officers would consider attempting escape if possible. In fact, it has been estimated that some two-thirds of British prisoners of war were generally content with their situation and made no attempt to escape during their time in captivity.

One Royal Air Force veteran recalled that "this business of it being our duty to escape has been greatly exaggerated. There were 2,500 men in our compound alone. If we had all tried to escape then it would have been absolute chaos". One case study highlights the extent to which some POWs believed they had an official duty to escape. Johnny Rawson was under the impression he had a duty to escape. As part of his attempted escape, he swapped identities with a dentist being moved to another camp. He recalled how a Senior British Officer (SBO) accused him of impersonating protected personnel. The SBO then revealed his escape attempt to a guard. Post war he reported the SBO for preventing him from carrying out his duty to escape. Nothing came of the complaint.

The German military courts who tried escaping Allied officers generally accepted the excuse that it was each man's duty to attempt to escape. With the exception of those that were executed extrajudicially by the Gestapo, recaptured prisoners of war were likely to face only a period in solitary confinement or transfer to a punishment camp.

United States Marine Corps Colonel James Devereux was captured by the Japanese on Wake Island in 1941. He later stated that he considered his duty as senior officer to the men under his command supplanted any personal duty to escape. This has since been referred to as Colonel Devereux's doctrine and likened to the captain's duty to go down with the ship.

== Post-war ==
On 17 August 1955 U.S. President Dwight D. Eisenhower issued executive order 10631 which implemented the Code of the United States Fighting Force, a code of conduct for U.S. military personnel. This code includes, for the first time, a requirement for U.S. prisoners of war to attempt to escape and to assist the escapes of others, covered by article III of the code. Article IV governs the conduct of senior officers of troops held in captivity and the duties of sub-ordinates to follow their orders.

There has been discussion as to how to resolve conflicts between the two duties; for example, if a senior officer orders his men not to escape. U.S. officers have been prosecuted for issuing such orders, which have been interpreted as unlawful for prohibiting subordinates from carrying out their duty under article III. However, such an order may be lawful if the escape exposes other prisoners to an unreasonable risk or jeopardizes the planned escape of a larger group of men.

The U.S. code of conduct has since been supplemented with two additional versions applicable in peacetime for personnel captured by foreign governments or terrorists. In these cases, the wording of article III is amended to state that personnel should "resist exploitation by [their] captors. [They] have no duty to escape and will attempt to escape only after careful consideration of the risk of violence, the chances of success, the consequences of recapture and the detrimental effect on detainees left behind".

Article III: If I am captured I will continue to resist by all means available. I will make every effort to escape and aid others to escape. I will accept neither parole nor special favors from the enemy. Article IV: If I become a prisoner of war, I will keep faith with my fellow prisoners. I will give no information or take part in any action which might be harmful to my comrades. If I am senior, I will take command. If not, I will obey the lawful orders of those appointed over me and will back them up in every way.
— Code of the United States Fighting Force

== Sources ==
=== Books ===
- Burgess, Colin (2019). The Diggers of Colditz (3 ed.). Australia: Simon & Schuster. ISBN 9781760852153.
