= Archie Van Winkle =

United States Marine

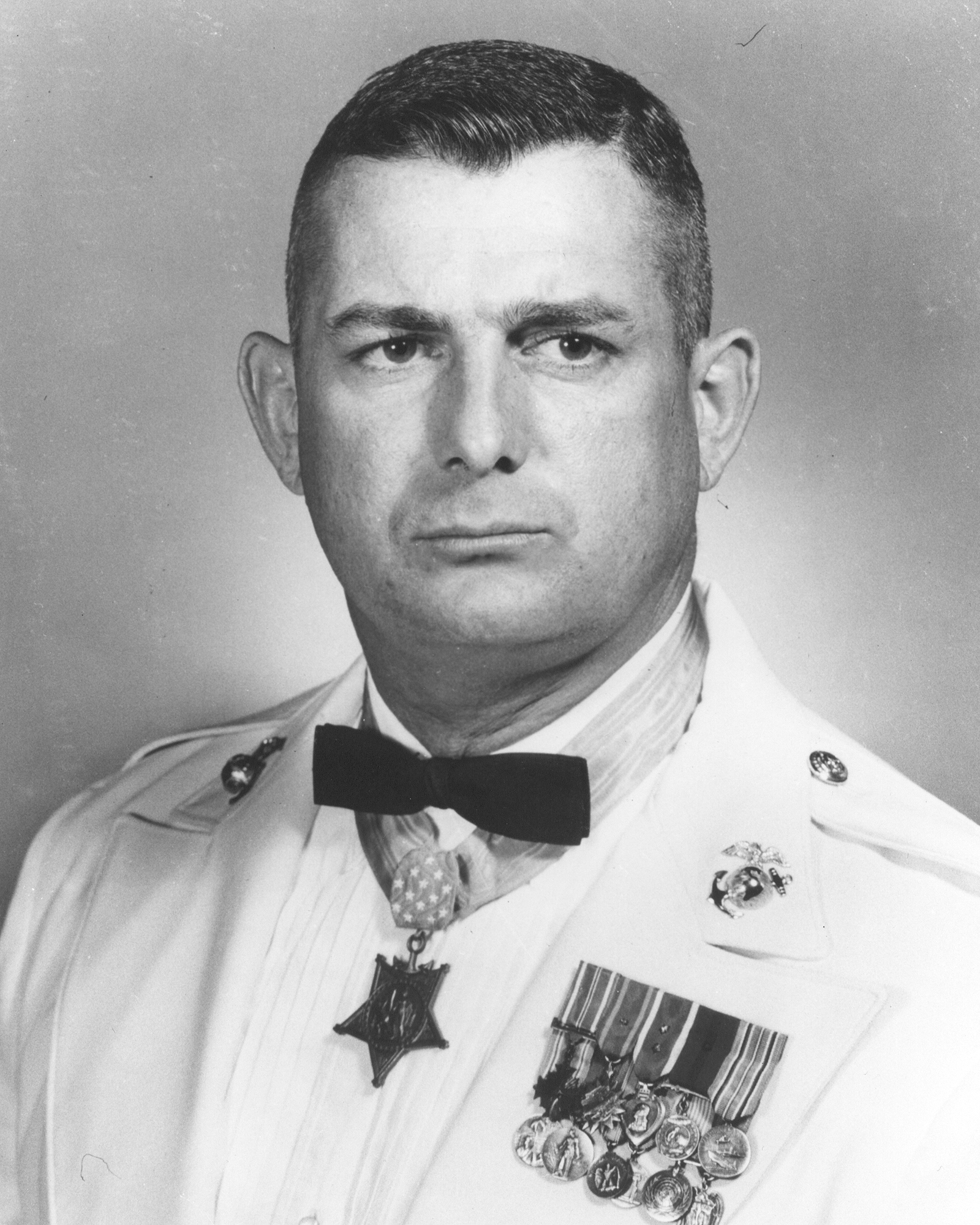
- Archie Van Winkle
- Born: March 17, 1925; Juneau, Territory of Alaska, U.S.
- Died: May 22, 1986 (aged 61); Ketchikan, Alaska, U.S.
- Burial place: Cremated and scattered at sea
- Military career
- Allegiance: United States
- Branch: United States Marine Corps
- Service years: 1942–1945; 1948–1974
- Rank: Colonel
- Unit: 1st Battalion, 7th Marines
- Commands: 2nd Battalion, 1st Marines
- Conflicts: World War II: Solomon Islands campaign; Philippines Campaign; Landing on Emirau; Korean War: Battle of Inchon; Chosin Reservoir advance; Vietnam War: Battle of Khe Sanh
- Awards: Medal of Honor; Distinguished Flying Cross; Bronze Star Medal (2) w/ "V" Device; Air Medal w/ V Device; Purple Heart (3)

Archie Van Winkle (March 17, 1925 – May 22, 1986) was a United States Marine who was awarded the Medal of Honor for his actions as a staff sergeant during the advance to the Chosin Reservoir in the Korean War.

A combat veteran of World War II, he was called to active duty with the Marine Corps Reserve after the outbreak of hostilities in Korea and was released to inactive duty on July 16, 1951. Van Winkle again returned to active duty and served in combat during the Vietnam War. He is one of two Medal of Honor recipients from Alaska.

== Early life and World War II ==
Born March 17, 1925, from American parents of Dutch descent in Juneau, Alaska, Van Winkle attended public school in Darrington, Washington. An ardent athlete, he captained both the boxing and football teams at Darrington High School, where he also played baseball and basketball. He entered the University of Washington in Seattle to study physical education, but left after a few months to enlist in the Marine Corps Reserve on December 14, 1942.

During almost three years of active duty, he served as an aviation radioman-gunner and mechanic, participating in the Solomons, Philippines and Emirau operations. On October 22, 1945, he received his honorable discharge.

He continued his studies in physical education for two years at Everett Junior College (now Everett Community College) and for another year at the University of Washington. In March 1948, he rejoined the Marine Corps Reserve and became a member of Company A, 11th Infantry Battalion, in Seattle.

== Korean War and after ==
The battalion was mobilized and ordered to Camp Pendleton, California, on August 7, 1950. Late that month he arrived in Korea and participated in the Inchon landing.

By November 2, 1950, Van Winkle had reached the rank of staff sergeant and was serving as an infantry platoon sergeant. On that night, near Sudong, North Korea during the advance to the Chosin Reservoir, he led a charge through withering enemy fire. A bullet shattered his arm and he was seriously wounded in the chest by a direct hit from a hand grenade. He refused to be evacuated and continued to shout orders and encouragement to his men while lying on the ground, weak from loss of blood. His leadership enabled the outnumbered platoon to repulse an enemy attack. For these actions, he was awarded the Medal of Honor.

Evacuated to Japan and later to the United States, he subsequently served for several months with the Marine guards at the Naval Base, Bremerton, Washington. He was released from active duty on July 16, 1951, and was attached to the 10th Infantry Battalion, U.S. Marine Corps Reserves, in Seattle.

President Harry S. Truman presented Van Winkle with the Medal of Honor during ceremonies at the White House on February 6, 1952. The following day he was sworn in as a second lieutenant by General Lemuel C. Shepherd, Jr., Commandant of the Marine Corps, having qualified under the "meritorious noncommissioned officer" program.

Later recalled to active duty, Van Winkle attended Basic School at Marine Corps Schools, Quantico, Virginia, from November 1952 to May 1953. First Lieutenant Van Winkle completed Air Observation School at Quantico that November and was assigned as an air observer with the 3rd Marine Division then at Camp Pendleton. He was later Assistant G-3 of Force Troops, Fleet Marine Force, Pacific, then served as a company executive officer and company commander, respectively, with the 3rd Battalion 9th Marines, 3rd Marine Division. He was promoted to captain on December 31, 1954, and in 1955, he was assigned as regimental liaison officer, 9th Marines.

From November 1955 until April 1958, he served as assistant officer in charge of the Marine Corps Recruiting Station, Indianapolis, Indiana. In May 1958, he was named commanding officer of the marine detachment aboard the USS Newport News. Following two years in this assignment, he was assigned to the college degree program at the University of Washington, Seattle, where he received his Bachelor of Arts degree in history in June 1961.

Transferred to Hawaii that month, Captain Van Winkle was assigned as a company commander with the 3rd Reconnaissance Battalion, 4th Marines, 1st Marine Brigade. In April 1962, he became director of the 1st Marine Brigade Schools and was credited with the establishment of a brigade guerilla warfare school. Earlier, as part of a special observer group sent to South Vietnam in late February 1962, he was commended by General Paul D. Harkins, U.S. Army, head of the United States Military Assistance Command in Vietnam, and Admirals H.D. Felt and J.H. Sides, CINCPAC, and CINCPAC Fleet commanders, respectively. He was promoted to major in August 1962.

In June 1964, Van Winkle reported to the Air Command and Staff College, Maxwell Air Force Base, Alabama. Upon graduation in June 1965, he was assigned duty as manpower analyst and, later, head, Operating Forces Section, Manpower Control Branch, G-1 Division, at Headquarters Marine Corps. While serving in his capacity, he was promoted to lieutenant colonel on July 1, 1967.

== Vietnam War ==
Van Winkle's next duty assignment was in the South Vietnam. He served consecutively as commanding officer, 2nd Battalion, 1st Marines; G-3 operations officer, First Marine Division; and as assistant operations officer, Task Force X-Ray, Sub Unit #1, First Marine Division, from August 1967 to September 1968, and earned the Bronze Star with Combat "V". A gold star in lieu of a second Bronze Star Medal with Combat "V" was awarded him for his actions on July 6, 1968, on Hill 689 near Khe Sanh Combat Base. He also received the Vietnamese Gallantry Cross with Gold Star.

He was commanding officer of 1st Battalion, 1st Marines from June 1968 to September 1968.

== Later life ==
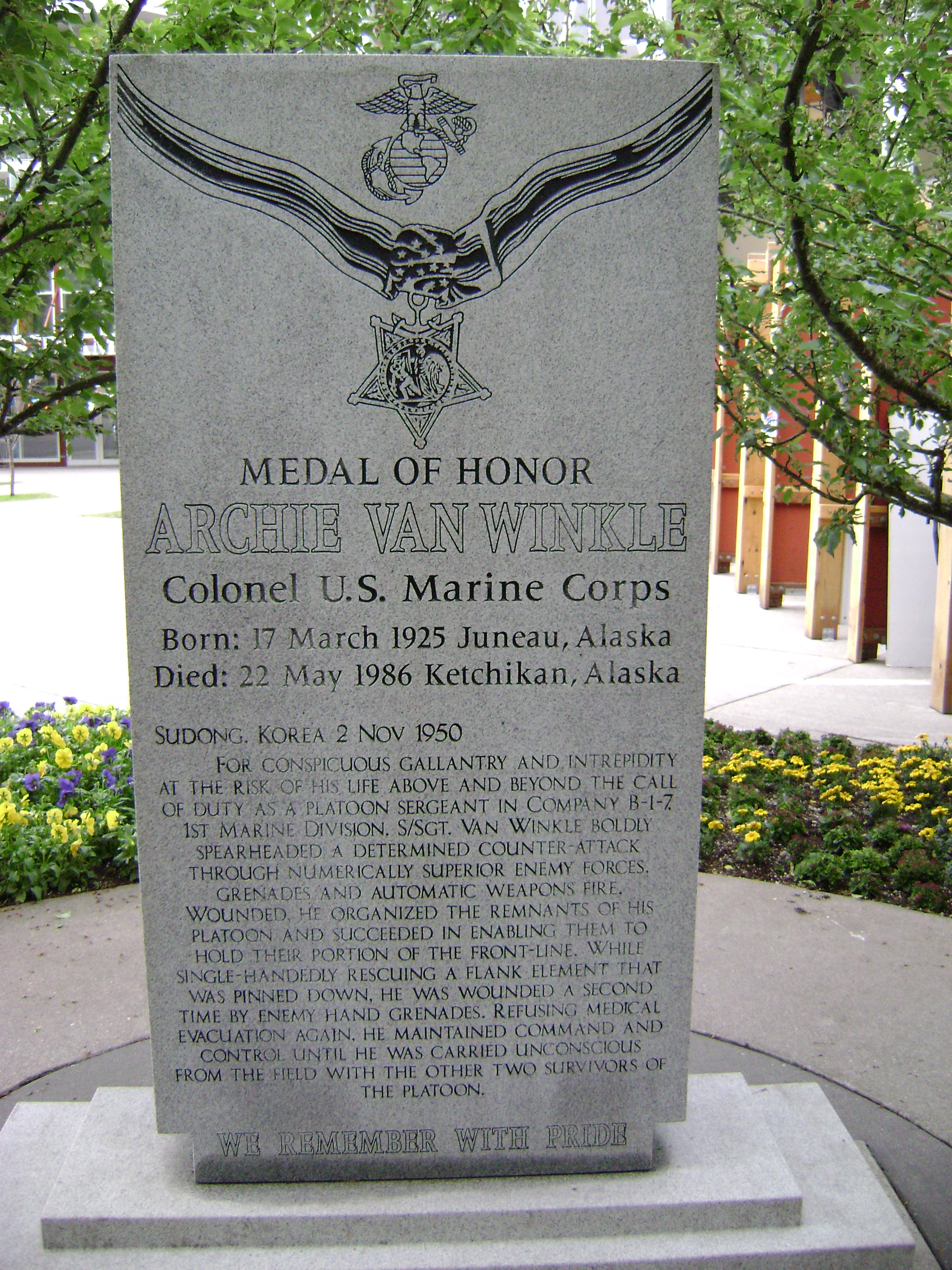
Van Winkle's monument in Juneau, Alaska

After his return to the United States, he was again assigned to the G-1 Division at Headquarters Marine Corps, this time as head of the Standards and Utilization Section, Manpower Control Branch. He then served as provost marshal at Camp Pendleton California then provost marshal general of the Marine Corps. He retired from service in February 1974.

In his retirement, Van Winkle lived on a boat in Bar Harbor near Ketchikan, Alaska. He died there on May 22, 1986, and his remains were cremated and scattered at sea in the Tongass Narrows, on which Ketchikan sits. A memorial headstone was placed in Sitka National Cemetery in Alaska.

== Honors ==
On October 1, 1997, a granite monument in Juneau, Alaska, was dedicated memorializing Archie Van Winkle, Alaska's only Medal of Honor recipient.

Van Winkle is also honored at the University of Washington Medal of Honor veterans memorial.

The events for which he received the Medal of Honor, and the story of his unit there is related in the book Colder Than Hell: A Marine Rifle Company at Chosin Reservoir by Joseph R. Owen, published by Presidio Press in 1996.

== Medal of Honor citation ==
The President of the United States takes pleasure in presenting the MEDAL OF HONOR to

STAFF SERGEANT ARCHIE VAN WINKLE
UNITED STATES MARINE CORPS RESERVE

for service as set forth in the following CITATION:

For conspicuous gallantry and intrepidity at the risk of his life above and beyond the call of duty while serving as a Platoon Sergeant in Company B, First Battalion, Seventh Marines, First Marine Division (Reinforced), in action against enemy aggressor forces in the vicinity of Sudong, Korea, on November 2, 1950. Immediately rallying the men in his area after a fanatical and numerically superior enemy force penetrated the center of the line under cover of darkness and pinned down the platoon with a devastating barrage of deadly, automatic weapons and grenade fire, Staff Sergeant Van Winkle boldly spearheaded a determined attack through withering fire against hostile frontal positions and, though he and all the others who charged with him were wounded, succeeded in enabling his platoon to gain the fire superiority and the opportunity to reorganize. Realizing that the left-flank squad was isolated from the rest of the unit, he rushed through forty yards of fierce enemy fire to reunite his troops despite an elbow wound which rendered one of his arms totally useless. Severely wounded a second time when a direct hit in the chest from a hostile hand grenade caused serious and painful wounds, he staunchly refused evacuation and continued to shout orders and words of encouragement to his depleted and battered platoon. Finally carried from his position unconscious from shock and loss of blood, Staff Sergeant Van Winkle served to inspire all who observed him to heroic efforts in successfully repulsing the enemy attack. His superb leadership, valiant fighting spirit and unfaltering devotion to duty in the face of heavy odds reflect the highest credit upon himself and the United States Naval Service.

/S/ HARRY S. TRUMAN

== Awards and Decorations ==
Colonel Van Winkle was awarded the following medals for his service

1st row	Medal of Honor		
2nd row	Distinguished Flying Cross	Bronze Star Medal with "V" Device and 5/16 inch star	Purple Heart with 2 5/16 inch stars
3rd row	Air Medal with 5/16 inch star	Combat Action Ribbon with 2 5/16 inch stars	Navy Presidential Unit Citation with 2 Service stars
4th row	Navy Unit Commendation	Marine Corps Good Conduct Medal with 1 Service star	American Campaign Medal
5th row	Asiatic-Pacific Campaign Medal with 4 Campaign stars	World War II Victory Medal	Navy Occupation Service Medal
6th row	National Defense Service Medal with 1 Service star	Korean Service Medal with 2 Campaign stars	Armed Forces Expeditionary Medal with 1 Service star
7th row	Vietnam Service Medal with 3 Campaign stars	Gallantry Cross with Gold Star	Philippine Presidential Unit Citation
8th row	Korean Presidential Unit Citation	RVN Gallantry Cross Unit Citation with Palm	Philippine Liberation Medal with 2 Campaign stars
9th row	United Nations Service Medal Korea	Vietnam Campaign Medal	Korean War Service Medal Retroactively Awarded, 2003

== University of Washington Medal of Honor Memorial ==
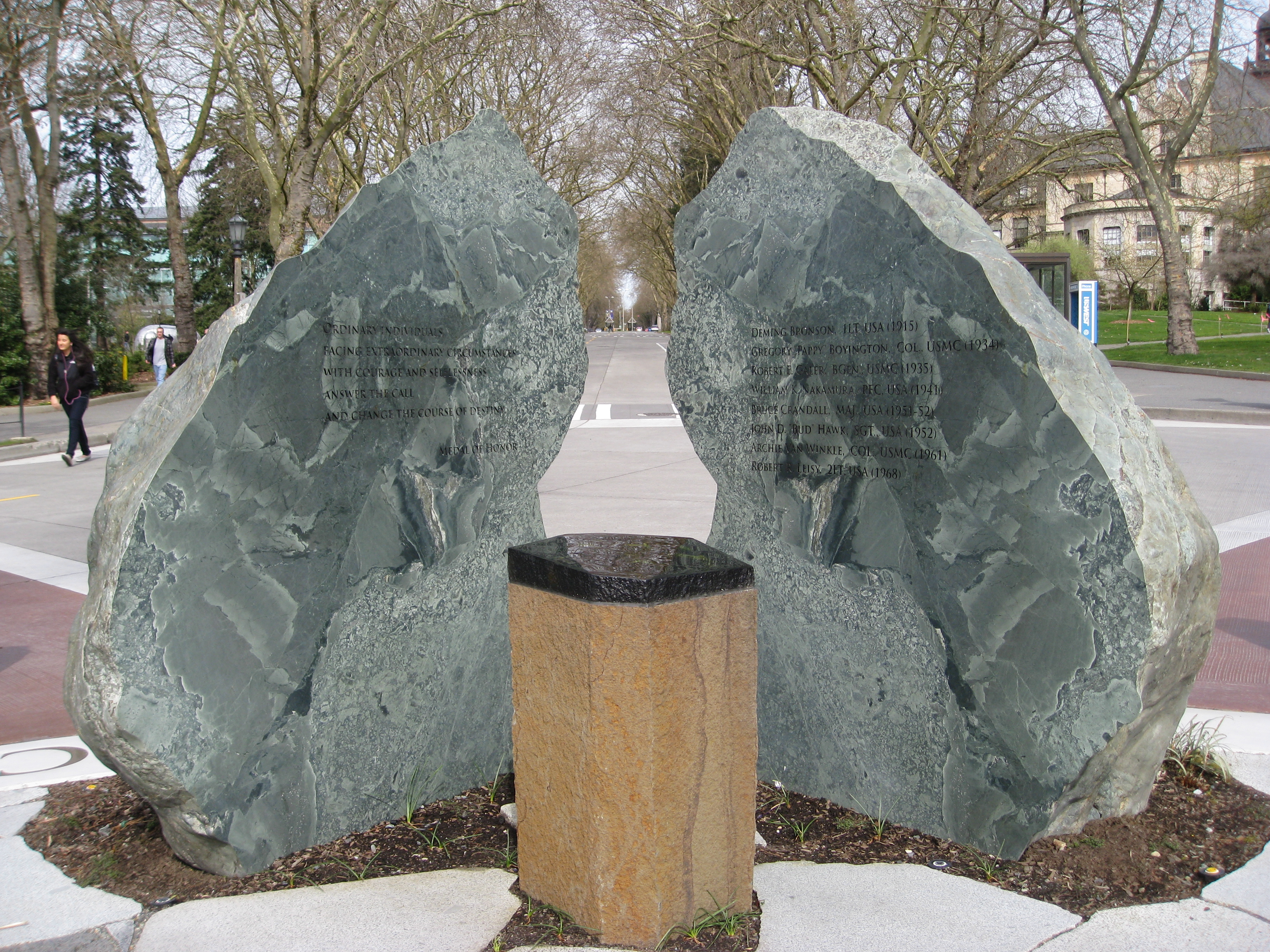
Medal of Honor memorial at the University of Washington

1`At the University of Washington in February 2006, a resolution recommending a memorial be erected to honor fighter ace and alumnus Pappy Boyington for his service during World War II was raised and defeated during a meeting of the student senate. Some people did not believe the resolution's sponsor had fully addressed the financial and logistical problems of installing a memorial, and some were questioning the widely held assumption that all warriors and acts of war are automatically worthy of memorialization. The story was picked up by some blogs and conservative news outlets, focusing on two statements made by student senators during the meeting. One student senator, Ashley Miller, said that the UW already had many monuments to "rich, white men" (Boyington claimed partial Sioux ancestry and was not rich); another, Jill Edwards, questioned whether the UW should memorialize a person who killed others, summarized in the minutes as saying "she didn't believe a member of the Marine Corps was an example of the sort of person UW wanted to produce." After its defeat, a new version of the original resolution was submitted that called for a memorial to all eight UW alumni who received the Medal of Honor after attending the UW. On April 4, 2006, the resolution passed by a vote of 64 to 14 with several abstentions, on a roll call vote. The University of Washington Medal of Honor memorial was constructed at the south end of Memorial Way (17th Ave NE), north of Red Square, in the interior of a traffic circle between Parrington and Kane Halls (47.6573°N 122.3097°W). Privately funded, it was completed in time for a Veterans Day dedication in November 2009. In addition to Greg Boyington, it honors Deming Bronson, Bruce Crandall, Robert Galer, John Hawk, Robert Leisy, William Nakamura, and Archie Van Winkle.

Ordinary individuals
facing extraordinary circumstances
with courage and selflessness
answer the call
and change the course of destiny.
Medal of Honor

== See also ==
- List of Korean War Medal of Honor recipients
