= List of Navy Cross recipients for the Korean War =

This is a list of Navy Cross recipients for actions of valor carried out during the Korean War, awarded by the United States Department of the Navy.

The Korean War was an escalation of border clashes between two rival Korean regimes, created at the end of World War II by the division of Korea into two occupation zones (a U.S. and Soviet one), with each Korean regime trying to topple the other through political and guerrilla tactics. In a very narrow sense, some may refer to it as a civil war, though many other factors were at play. After failing to strengthen their cause in the free elections held in South Korea during May 1950 and the refusal of South Korea to hold new elections per North Korean demands, the communist North Korean Army moved south on June 25, 1950 to attempt to reunite the Korean peninsula, which had been formally divided since 1948. The conflict was then expanded by the United States and the Soviet Union's involvement as part of the larger Cold War. The main hostilities were during the period from June 25, 1950 until an armistice was signed on July 27, 1953.

As of June 2022, this list is incomplete, showing 270 Navy Crosses awarded in all service branches for actions of valor during the Korean War: 43 to US Navy recipients; 224 to US Marine Corps recipients; and one US Army recipient. By partial comparison, as of June 2022, the U.S. Department of Defense shows 49 awarded to Navy recipients and 248 to Marines Corps recipients, for acts of valor during the Korean War.

== A ==
Name	Service	Rank	Place of action	Date of action	Notes
Welton R. Abell	Marine Corps	First Lieutenant	between Hagaru-ri & Koto-ri, Korea	December 6–8, 1950	Company commander
Jon D. Adams	Marine Corps	Private First Class	Korea	September 4–5, 1952	Single-handedly killed 58 of the enemy with a machine gun
Richard J. Adams	Marine Corps	Private First Class	Korea	March 19–20, 1953	Rifleman
George W. Alexander Jr.	Marine Corps	Second Lieutenant	Korea	April 8–9, 1952	Intelligence officer
David W. Alley	Marine Corps	Private First Class	Yudam-ni, Korea	November 30, 1950	Automatic rifleman
Wayne D. Austin	Navy	Chief Hospital Corpsman	near Seoul, Korea	September 22, 1950	Despite being severely wounded, he rendered aid to 10 wounded Marines

== B ==
This along with the †, indicates that the Navy Cross was awarded posthumously

Name	Service	Rank	Place of action	Date of action	Notes
Arlene K. Babbitt	Navy	Chief Aviation Machinist's Mate	near Sariwon, Korea	October 26, 1951	Helicopter pilot who rescued two pilots who had been shot 80 miles behind enemy lines
Arthur R. Bancroft †	Marine Corps	First Lieutenant	Korea	September 29, 1950	Located a friendly observation plane which had been shot down behind enemy lines before he himself was shot down
Charles L. Banks	Marine Corps	Lieutenant Colonel	Chosin Reservoir, Korea	November 29 – December 6, 1950	Battalion commander
Virgil W. Banning	Marine Corps	Lieutenant Colonel	Korea	April 23, 1951	Battalion commander
Arthur G. Barbosa	Marine Corps	Sergeant	Korea	April 15, 1952	Personally repelled three enemy assaults with a machine gun, killing 12 of the enemy
Quinton T. Barlow	Marine Corps	Technical Sergeant	Korea	April 16, 1952	Platoon sergeant
John M. Barrett †	Marine Corps	Corporal	Korea	June 10, 1951	Led his squad in an assault of an enemy hill, overrunning an emplacement despite multiple wounds
Ora E. Barrett Jr. †	Marine Corps	Private First Class	Korea	June 10, 1951	Provided covering fire which allowed the wounded to be evacuated
Robert H. Barrow	Marine Corps	Captain	Hill 1081, Koto-ri, Korea	December 9–10, 1950	Company commander, later awarded Distinguished Service Cross, served as 27th Commandant of the Marine Corps
William H. Bates	Marine Corps	Second Lieutenant	Korea	July 24–25, 1953	Platoon leader
James T. Beard	Marine Corps	Private	Hagaru-ri, Korea	December 3, 1950	After killing seven of the enemy in hand-to-hand combat, he single-handedly captured an enemy machine gun and used it to kill 10 more of the enemy
Robert E. Beatty	Marine Corps	Private First Class	Korea	April 8–9, 1952	
Van D. Bell Jr.	Marine Corps	First Lieutenant	near Hwachon, Korea	May 29, 1951	First award (second was in Vietnam War)
Adolfo Benavides	Marine Corps	Private First Class	Korea	October 6, 1952	Threw several enemy hand grenades from his bunker before one detonated in his hand
Elmer R. Betts Jr.	Marine Corps	Corporal	Korea	February 3, 1953	
Harrison F. Betts	Marine Corps	First Lieutenant	Hagaru-ri, Korea	November 28–29, 1950	After all other members of his platoon were wounded, he personally killed 11 of the enemy with a machine gun over a period of three hours
Richard N. Blasongame	Marine Corps	Private First Class	Hwang-gi area, Korea	September 15–16, 1951	Led his machine gun section in killing 287 of the enemy
Joseph A. Blick	Marine Corps	Private First Class	Korea	December 7–8, 1950	Personally captured four and killed 14 of the enemy despite multiple wounds
John F. Bolt	Marine Corps	Major	Korea	July 11, 1953	Shot down two enemy jets, bringing his total score during the war to six. This feat made him the first and only Marine jet ace in history. He had also shot down six planes in World War II.
Dorsie H. Booker Jr. †	Marine Corps	First Lieutenant	Yudam-ni, Korea	December 2, 1950	Platoon commander
Walter C. Borawski †	Marine Corps	Technical Sergeant	Korea	January 13, 1953	Platoon sergeant
Guy P. Bordelon	Navy	Lieutenant	over Seoul, Korea	July 17, 1953	First and only Navy ace of the war, and the only night fighter ace in Korea.
Murray M. Bowen †	Navy	Hospitalman	Yong Dong Po-Ri, Korea	September 21, 1950	After rendering aid to nine wounded Marines, he was attempting to reach a 10th when he was killed
Billie J. Bowerman	Marine Corps	Private First Class	Korea	May 10, 1952	Automatic rifleman
Palmer S. Braaten †	Marine Corps	Private First Class	Yudam-ni, Korea	December 2, 1950	Squad leader
Bobbie B. Bradley	Marine Corps	Second Lieutenant	Korea	December 8, 1950	Platoon commander
Charles W. Bradshaw †	Marine Corps	Private First Class	Korea	April 25–26, 1953	Fire team leader
Joseph C. Brady	Navy	Hospitalman	Korea	September 13, 1952	Later died of malaria in Vietnam
Earl B. Bratback †	Marine Corps	Corporal	Korea	April 25, 1951	Rifle squad leader
Richard R. Breen	Marine Corps	Captain	near Seoul, Korea	September 26–27, 1950	Company commander
Donald E. Brewer †	Navy	Lieutenant, Junior Grade	Central Korea	June 19, 1953	
William C. Britt	Marine Corps	First Lieutenant	Korea	March 19, 1953	Platoon leader
Dale W. Brown	Navy	Hospitalman	Korea	April 18, 1953	Threw several enemy hand grenades from his position before he was wounded by one
William P. Brown Jr. †	Marine Corps	Captain	Korea	February 24, 1952	Second award (first was in World War II). Crashed his plane into an enemy convoy
Rollins M. Bryant †	Marine Corps	Staff Sergeant	near Tumae-ri, Korea	May 28, 1952	Platoon sergeant
Thomas A. Burchick	Navy	Hospital Corpsman Third Class	Korea	May 29, 1951	Corpsman
Phillip J. Burr	Marine Corps	Second Lieutenant	Korea	October 6, 1952	Platoon commander
George H. Butler	Marine Corps	Master Sergeant	near Hongch-on, Korea	March 11, 1951	Despite being wounded multiple times while assaulting an enemy position, he succeeded in killing 10 of the enemy
Wallace S. Butler Jr. †	Marine Corps	Second Lieutenant	Korea	April 8, 1953	Platoon commander

== C ==
This along with the †, indicates that the Navy Cross was awarded posthumously

Name	Service	Rank	Place of action	Date of action	Notes
Crayton L. Caldwell †	Marine Corps	Corporal	Korea	October 6, 1952	
John J. Canney †	Marine Corps	Major	Korea	November 28, 1950	Battalion executive officer
Mario J. Cardillo †	Marine Corps	Private First Class	Korea	May 9, 1952	Mortar ammunition carrier
Fred D. Chadwick †	Marine Corps	Sergeant	Korea	January 31, 1953	Platoon sergeant
William B. Chain Jr.	Marine Corps	Staff Sergeant	Korea	August 13, 1952	Squad leader
Theodore H. Chenoweth	Marine Corps	Second Lieutenant	Korea	March 28, 1953	Platoon commander
John W. Chinner	Marine Corps	Sergeant	Korea	March 9, 1951	Machine gun section leader
Thomas A. Christensen Jr. †	Navy	Dentalman	Kowan, Korea	November 6, 1950	Corpsman
Bernard W. Christofferson	Marine Corps	First Lieutenant	Yudam-ni, Korea	November 28, 1950	Platoon commander
Joe V. Churchill	Navy	Hospitalman	Korea	April 23, 1951	Corpsman, originally awarded Bronze Star which was upgraded to Navy Cross in 1985
Eugene F. Clark	Navy	Lieutenant	North Korea	September 13–14, 1950	Special operations group member
Albert H. Collins †	Marine Corps	Private First Class	Korea	September 21, 1950	Assistant machine gunner
Lyle F. Conaway	Marine Corps	Private First Class	Korea	September 15–16, 1951	Rifleman
John D. Counselman	Marine Corps	Second Lieutenant	near Seoul, Korea	September 17 & 26, 1950	Platoon leader
Ernie L. Crawford	Navy	Aviation Machinist's Mate Second Class	Hungnam area, Korea	January 22, 1952	Rescue helicopter crewman
Frank S. Cross	Marine Corps	Private First Class	Korea	March 19–20, 1953	Automatic rifleman

== D–E ==
This along with the †, indicates that the Navy Cross was awarded posthumously

Name	Service	Rank	Place of action	Date of action	Notes
Donald A. Daigneault	Marine Corps	Private First Class	Korea	September 12, 1951	Automatic rifleman
Joseph W. Dailey	Marine Corps	Technical Sergeant	Korea	February 25, 1953	Later served as 5th Sergeant Major of the Marine Corps
James C. Davis †	Marine Corps	Staff Sergeant	near Chindong-ni, Korea	August 8, 1950	Smothered a defective hand grenade with his own body
John G. Demas	Marine Corps	Captain	Korea	August 13–15, 1952	Company commander
Loyd V. Dirst	Marine Corps	Chief Warrant Officer	near Pusong-ni, Korea	November 29–30, 1950	Organized his company during an ambush, personally accounting for several of the enemy before he was seriously wounded
Richard M. Doezema	Marine Corps	First Lieutenant	Korea	April 24, 1951	Artillery forward observer attached to Korean Marine regiment
Marion T. Dragastin †	Navy	Lieutenant, Junior Grade	North Korea	May 18, 1951	Fighter pilot
Matthew D. Dukes	Marine Corps	Corporal	Korea	September 14, 1951	Fire team leader
Andrew F. Dunay	Marine Corps	Sergeant	near Hagaru-ri, Korea	December 6–7, 1950	
Leland E. Ehrlich †	Marine Corps	Sergeant	Korea	December 7, 1950	Single-handedly attacked an enemy machine gun nest and disrupted an enemy attack
Robert J. Elliott †	Marine Corps	Private First Class	Korea	January 26, 1951	
George W. Elmore †	Marine Corps	Private First Class	Korea	February 26, 1951	Automatic rifleman
John B. Elwell †	Marine Corps	Private First Class	Korea	February 3, 1953	Single-handedly assaulted and routed the enemy from a bunker before he was mortally wounded
Ralph F. Estey	Marine Corps	Captain	Korea	March 27–28, 1953	Company commander

== F–G ==
This along with the †, indicates that the Navy Cross was awarded posthumously

Name	Service	Rank	Place of action	Date of action	Notes
David K. Fauser	Marine Corps	First Lieutenant	Korea	February 3, 1953	Platoon commander
John L. Fenwick Jr.	Marine Corps	Sergeant	Hwachon Reservoir area, Korea	April 1951	Belatedly awarded Navy Cross in 1960
Teddy R. Fielding	Navy	Lieutenant	Northeast coast of Korea	December 3, 1951	Reconnaissance swimmer
Joseph R. Fisher	Marine Corps	First Lieutenant	Hagaru-ri, Korea	November 28–29, 1950	Company commander
George F. Fitzpatrick †	Marine Corps	Private First Class	Korea	January 31, 1953	Rifleman
Charlie Foster †	Marine Corps	Sergeant	Korea	November 6, 1950	Platoon sergeant
Fred T. Foster	Navy	Hospital Corpsman Third Class	Yudam-ni, Korea	November 28, 1950	Corpsman
Edward Fristock †	Marine Corps	Master Sergeant	near Waryong-ni, Korea	June 7, 1951	Company gunnery sergeant
James P. Gallagher	Marine Corps	Private	Korea	November 27–28, 1950	Assumed command of his machine gun section and directed his Marines in inflicting 100 casualties on the enemy
William M. Gaul †	Marine Corps	Sergeant	Korea	September 13–14, 1951	Platoon sergeant
William F. Gentleman	Navy	Hospitalman	Korea	August 15, 1952	Rendered aid to wounded Marines under heavy fire for nine hours before he himself was wounded
Walter W. George †	Marine Corps	Private First Class	near Yudam-ni, Korea	December 2, 1950	Automatic rifleman
Donald W. Gilligan	Marine Corps	Private First Class	Korea	October 27, 1950	Assistant machine gunner
Joseph L. Giovannucci	Marine Corps	Private First Class	Korea	September 11, 1951	Assistant machine gunner
Martin L. Givot †	Marine Corps	Second Lieutenant	Korea	October 26–27, 1952	Platoon leader
Callis C. Gooding	Navy	Aviation Machinist's Mate Third Class	near Sariwon, Korea	October 26, 1951	Rescue helicopter crewman
Rodney J. Green	Marine Corps	Private First Class	Korea	September 4–5, 1952	Machine gun squad leader
John N. Guild †	Marine Corps	Second Lieutenant	Hill 85, Yongdungp’o, Korea	September 20, 1950	Platoon leader
Richard S. Gzik †	Marine Corps	Private First Class	Korea	December 2, 1950	Automatic rifleman

== H ==
This along with the †, indicates that the Navy Cross was awarded posthumously

Name	Service	Rank	Place of action	Date of action	Notes
John H. C. Hamby	Marine Corps	Sergeant	near Yudam-ni, Korea	November 27, 1950	Squad leader
Weldon D. Harris †	Marine Corps	Corporal	near Seoul, Korea	September 23–24, 1950	Fire team leader
William F. Harris †	Marine Corps	Lieutenant Colonel	between Hagaru-ri & Koto-ri	December 7, 1950	Battalion commander
Roy E. Harrison †	Marine Corps	Private First Class	near Inje, Korea	June 11, 1951	Machine gunner
Amon F. Harvey Jr. †	Marine Corps	Private First Class	near Yudam-ni, Korea	December 2, 1950	Rifleman
Robert C. Hendrickson	Marine Corps	Captain	Korea	September 12, 1951	Company commander
Howard C. Hensley Jr.	Marine Corps	Sergeant	Korea	January 13, 1953	Squad leader
Wilbur N. Herndon	Marine Corps	First Lieutenant	Korea	December 7, 1950	Artillery battery executive officer
Ernest J. Hightower †	Marine Corps	Private First Class	Korea	June 1, 1951	Fire team leader
Frederick E. Hilliard	Marine Corps	Second Lieutenant	Korea	December 16, 1952	Platoon leader
Morse L. Holladay	Marine Corps	Captain	near Hagaru-ri, Korea	November 29–30, 1950	Company commander
William C. Holmberg	Marine Corps	Second Lieutenant	Korea	June 13, 1952	Platoon leader
William P. Holt	Marine Corps	Private First Class	Sudong-ni, Korea	December 10, 1950	Machine gunner
John L. Hopkins	Marine Corps	Lieutenant Colonel	Hill 611, Korea	June 2, 1951	Battalion commander
Russell J. House †	Marine Corps	Corporal	Kimpo Airfield, Korea	September 18, 1950	
Donald J. Hovatter †	Navy	Hospital Corpsman Third Class	Korea	May 29, 1951	Corpsman
Warren C. Howard	Marine Corps	Private First Class	Korea	December 7, 1950	Machine gunner
Milton A. Hull	Marine Corps	Captain	near Yudam-ni, Korea	November 27, 1950	Company commander
David L. Hyde †	Marine Corps	Second Lieutenant	Korea	October 27, 1952	Platoon leader

== I–K ==
This along with the †, indicates that the Navy Cross was awarded posthumously

Name	Service	Rank	Place of action	Date of action	Notes
Nils V. Ingemansson	Marine Corps	Sergeant	Korea	September 6–7, 1952	Squad leader
James E. Jackson Jr. †	Marine Corps	Private First Class	Korea	May 17, 1951	Automatic rifleman
R. A. Jackson †	Marine Corps	Private First Class	near Yudam-ni, Korea	November 28, 1950	Rifleman
Austin C. Jenson †	Marine Corps	Second Lieutenant	near Yudam-ni, Korea	November 29, 1950	Platoon leader
Horace L. Johnson Jr.	Marine Corps	First Lieutenant	Korea	November 28–29, 1950	Company executive officer
Walter P. Johnson	Marine Corps	Private First Class	Korea	July 5, 1952	Smothered an enemy hand grenade with his own body and was seriously wounded
Donald R. Jones	Marine Corps	Second Lieutenant	near Koto-ri Pass, Korea	December 8, 1950	Platoon leader
Jack R. Jones	Marine Corps	Captain	near Yudam-ni, Korea	November 27 – December 7, 1950	Company commander
Vance E. Kee	Navy	Hospital Corpsman Third Class	near Yang-gu, Korea	June 19, 1951	Shielded a wounded Marine from an exploding mine using his own body
Joseph F. Keenan †	Navy	Hospital Corpsman Third Class	Korea	March 26–27, 1953	
Harrol Kiser	Marine Corps	First Lieutenant	near Hagaru-ri, Korea	December 3, 1950	Platoon leader
Alex J. Kitka	Navy	Hospital Corpsman Third Class	Korea	July 16–17, 1953	Administered first aid to comrades under intense enemy fire until all casualties were evacuated
Edwin L. Knox	Marine Corps	Technical Sergeant	between Yudam-ni & Hagaru-ri, Korea	December 1–3, 1950	Platoon sergeant
Robert D. Kohler	Marine Corps	Private First Class	Korea	March 3, 1953	Automatic rifleman
Vincent R. Kramer	Marine Corps	Major	North Korea	June 30, July 2 & 7, 1951	Led 100 South Korean troops into enemy territory
Joseph R. Kurcaba †	Marine Corps	First Lieutenant	Korea	October 21 – December 8, 1950	Company commander

== L ==
This along with the †, indicates that the Navy Cross was awarded posthumously

Name	Service	Rank	Place of action	Date of action	Notes
Donald F. Lambert †	Marine Corps	Second Lieutenant	Korea	January 8, 1953	Platoon commander
Jack F. Larson	Marine Corps	Sergeant	near Hongch-on, Korea	March 11, 1951	Squad leader
James F. Lawrence Jr.	Marine Corps	Major	between Hagaru-ri & Koto-ri	December 6–7, 1950	Operations officer and battalion executive officer
Benjamin G. Lee †	Marine Corps	Major	Korea	March 29, 1953	
Kurt C. Lee	Marine Corps	First Lieutenant	near Sudong	November 2–3, 1950	Platoon leader
Joseph R. Leeds †	Marine Corps	Corporal	near Koto-ri, Korea	December 8, 1950	Assaulted an enemy machine gun position and killed nine of the enemy in hand-to-hand combat before he was killed
Lawrence E. Lett †	Marine Corps	Corporal	Korea	October 27, 1952	Squad leader
Ronald N. Levasseur †	Marine Corps	Private First Class	near Hagaru-ri, Korea	November 28–29, 1950	Platoon messenger
Charles G. Little	Marine Corps	Second Lieutenant	Korea	June 24–25, 1952	Platoon leader
Homer L. Litzenberg Jr.	Marine Corps	Colonel	between Hagaru-ri and Koto-ri, Korea	December 6–7, 1950	Regiment commander
William J. Livingston	Marine Corps	Second Lieutenant	Korea	February 27, 1953	Platoon leader
Herbert M. Lorence	Marine Corps	Captain	Korea	March 28, 1953	Company commander
Joseph J. Louder	Marine Corps	Staff Sergeant	Korea	August 17, 1952	Platoon sergeant
William B. Lourim †	Marine Corps	Sergeant	near Yanggu, Korea	June 10, 1951	Combat correspondent
Frank E. Lovett Jr. †	Marine Corps	Sergeant	Korea	March 26, 1953	Squad leader
Eugene L. Lutz	Marine Corps	Sergeant	Korea	June 26, 1951	Machine gun section leader
Theodore J. Lutz Jr.	Marine Corps	Second Lieutenant	Korea	July 25, 1953	Platoon leader

== M ==
This along with the †, indicates that the Navy Cross was awarded posthumously

Name	Service	Rank	Place of action	Date of action	Notes
John J. Magda †	Navy	Lieutenant Commander	Tanch-on, Korea	March 8, 1951	World War II ace, continued to carry out bombing and strafing runs despite his aircraft being damaged
Perry A. Mallette	Marine Corps	Sergeant	Korea	July 6, 1952	
Frederick J. Markland	Marine Corps	Private	Kowon, Korea	November 6, 1950	Railroad train guard
Donald E. Mason	Navy	Hospitalman	Korea	October 12, 1952	
Richard Matheney	Marine Corps	Private First Class	Korea	April 24, 1951	Artillery forward observer
Bruce Mathewson Jr. †	Marine Corps	Staff Sergeant	near Koto-ri, Korea	November 29, 1950	Machine gun section leader
John E. Mausen Jr.	Navy	Hospitalman	Korea	October 6, 1952	
Paul N. McCloskey Jr.	Marine Corps	Second Lieutenant	Korea	May 29, 1951	Platoon leader
William J. McClung III	Marine Corps	Master Sergeant	Korea	December 7, 1950	POW during World War II
Harold O. McEachern	Navy	Lieutenant, Junior Grade	near Wonsan, Korea	August 5, 1952	Helicopter pilot who located and rescued Marine Medal of Honor recipient Robert E. Galer, who had been shot down behind enemy lines
Patrick T. McGahn Jr.	Marine Corps	Second Lieutenant	Korea	April 22–23, 1951	Platoon leader
Thomas P. McGuire	Marine Corps	Sergeant	Hill 134, Korea	January 8, 1953	Squad leader
George C. McNaughton	Marine Corps	First Lieutenant	near Seoul, Korea	September 24, 1950	Platoon leader
James H. McVeen †	Navy	Hospitalman	Korea	March 27, 1953	
John F. Meade	Marine Corps	Private First Class	near Yudam-ni, Korea	November 27, 1950	Platoon runner
John B. Melvin	Marine Corps	Captain	Korea	March 26–29, 1953	Company commander
Richard C. Merrick †	Navy	Commander	Korea	May 1951	Strike leader
Earl D. Midkiff	Marine Corps	Private First Class	Korea	November 3, 1950	Picked up an enemy hand grenade and attempted to throw it out of his foxhole. He was seriously wounded when it detonated in his hand but he saved the life of a Marine. Belatedly awarded Navy Cross in 1964.
Charles D. Mize	Marine Corps	First Lieutenant	Hill 216 & Seoul, Korea	September 23–29, 1950	Company commander
Charles H. Monroe Jr.	Marine Corps	Private First Class	near Hagaru-ri, Korea	November 28–29, 1950	Rifleman
Clarence G. Moody Jr.	Marine Corps	Captain	Korea	August 12–13, 1952	Company commander
Anthony G. Morrison †	Marine Corps	First Lieutenant	Korea	November 11, 1952	Company commander
Daniel M. Murphy	Marine Corps	Staff Sergeant	near Yudam-ni, Korea	November 27–28, 1950	Platoon sergeant
Benjamin H. Murray	Marine Corps	Second Lieutenant	Korea	March 26, 1953	Outpost commander
Raymond L. Murray	Marine Corps	Lieutenant Colonel	Hagaru-ri & Koto-ri, Korea	December 6–7, 1950	Second award (first was in World War II)

== N–O ==
This along with the †, indicates that the Navy Cross was awarded posthumously

Name	Service	Rank	Place of action	Date of action	Notes
George M. Neal	Navy	Aviation Machinist's Mate Third Class	North Korea	July 3, 1951	POW
Franklin B. Nihart	Marine Corps	Lieutenant Colonel	Hill 749, Hwanggi, Korea	September 15–16, 1951	Battalion commander
Harvey W. Nolan	Marine Corps	Second Lieutenant	Hwachon, Korea	April 23, 1951	Platoon leader
Henry E. Noonkester	Marine Corps	Sergeant	Koto-ri, Korea	December 9, 1950	Squad leader
Ramón Núñez-Juárez †	Marine Corps	Private First Class	Korea	August 9, 1952	Automatic rifleman
Terrance W. O'Donnell †	Navy	Hospitalman	Korea	June 25, 1952	Corpsman
James W. Ogden †	Marine Corps	Private First Class	Hagaru-ri, Korea	November 30, 1950	
John Olihovik	Army	Captain	Chuchon-ni, Korea	February 20, 1951	L-5 airplane pilot
Edmond T. Orsulak	Marine Corps	Private First Class	near Yudam-ni, Korea	November 30 – December 1, 1950	Platoon runner
James W. O'Toole †	Marine Corps	Private First Class	near Seoul, Korea	September 24, 1950	Machine gunner

== P–Q ==
This along with the †, indicates that the Navy Cross was awarded posthumously

Name	Service	Rank	Place of action	Date of action	Notes
John U. D. Page †	Army	Lieutenant Colonel	near Sudong-ni, Korea	December 10, 1950	Also awarded Medal of Honor, for overall actions of November 29 to December 10, 1950
Waller J. Parker	Navy	Hospitalman	near Yudam-ni, Korea	November 29, 1950	
Donald L. Parks †	Marine Corps	Second Lieutenant	Korea	May 6, 1952	Pilot
Earl F. Peach †	Marine Corps	Sergeant	Korea	November 3, 1950	Platoon runner
Chester O. Penney Jr. †	Marine Corps	First Lieutenant	Korea	November 2–11, 1950	Platoon leader
Uel D. Peters	Marine Corps	Captain	Chosin Reservoir, Korea	November 27 – December 6, 1950	Company commander
George E. Petro	Marine Corps	Captain	Sudong-ni, Korea	December 10, 1950	Company commander
Walter D. Phillips Jr. †	Marine Corps	Captain	near Yudam-ni, Korea	November 27, 1950	Company commander
Paul N. Polley	Navy	Hospitalman	Korea	March 26–27, 1953	
Charles E. Pope †	Navy	Hospital Corpsman Third Class	Korea	February 22, 1953	
Clinton A. Puckett	Marine Corps	Staff Sergeant	Korea	June 21, 1952	Platoon sergeant, later served as 6th Sergeant Major of the Marine Corps
Lewis B. Puller	Marine Corps	Colonel	between Koto-ri & Hungnam, Korea	December 5–10, 1950	Fifth award (first two were in occupation of Nicaragua, second two were in World War II)

== R ==
This along with the †, indicates that the Navy Cross was awarded posthumously

Name	Service	Rank	Place of action	Date of action	Notes
Arlis W. Ramsay †	Marine Corps	Sergeant	Korea	March 28, 1953	Squad leader
Robert J. Raymond †	Marine Corps	Sergeant	Korea	July 26, 1953	Platoon guide
Benjamin S. Read	Marine Corps	Captain	Chosin Reservoir, Korea	December 7, 1950	Artillery battery commander
Kenneth L. Reusser	Marine Corps	Major	Inchon area, Korea	August 5, 1950	Second award (first was in World War II)
Clayton L. Roberts †	Marine Corps	Sergeant	Korea	October 27, 1950	Machine gun squad leader
Stanley S. Robinson	Marine Corps	Private	near Sudong, Korea	December 2–4, 1950	Fire team leader
Harold S. Roise	Marine Corps	Lieutenant Colonel	Inchon & Seoul, Korea	September 15–26, 1950	First award, Battalion commander
Harold S. Roise	Marine Corps	Lieutenant Colonel	Chosin Reservoir, Korea	November 27 – December 11, 1950	Second award, battalion commander
Enrique Romero-Nieves	Marine Corps	Private First Class	Korea	October 26, 1952	Squad leader
John A. Rowe	Marine Corps	Second Lieutenant	Korea	May 31, 1952	Attempted to throw an enemy hand grenade away from his Marines and was seriously wounded when it exploded
Franklin D. Roy	Marine Corps	Corporal	Korea	October 26, 1952	Wireman
Charles V. Rust †	Marine Corps	Corporal	Hill 673, Korea	September 12, 1951	Fire team leader
Howard Ryan †	Marine Corps	Sergeant	Korea	October 7, 1952	Squad leader

== S ==
This along with the †, indicates that the Navy Cross was awarded posthumously

Name	Service	Rank	Place of action	Date of action	Notes
Robert B. Salsberry	Marine Corps	Corporal	near Seoul, Korea	September 26, 1950	Despite being wounded, he single-handedly held off the enemy for seven hours, saving the lives of six wounded Marines.
Webb D. Sawyer	Marine Corps	Lieutenant Colonel	Korea	April 22–25, 1951	Battalion commander
James E. Scott	Marine Corps	Sergeant	Hagaru-ri, Korea	November 30, 1950	
Edward H. Seeburger	Marine Corps	First Lieutenant	between Yudam-ni & Hagaru-ri	December 2, 1950	Provisional company commander
Russell J. Seldal	Marine Corps	Private First Class	Chosin Reservoir, Korea	December 4, 1950	Cannoneer
Robert Serrano	Navy	Hospitalman	Korea	September 12, 1951	Shielded a wounded Marine from an exploding mine with his own body
Walter C. Shonk	Marine Corps	Private First Class	Korea	June 10, 1951	Automatic rifleman
Darcy V. Shouldice	Navy	Lieutenant Commander	off Wonsan Harbor	October 12, 1950	
Louis J. Sigmund	Marine Corps	Private First Class	Korea	November 28, 1951	Leaped into a bunker to throw out an enemy hand grenade away from a Marine. He lost his left hand from the explosion and was also wounded in the head.
Lloyd B. Smalley †	Marine Corps	Sergeant	Korea	December 8, 1952	Squad leader
Billy D. Smith †	Navy	Hospitalman	Korea	July 11–13, 1953	
David E. Smith †	Marine Corps	Sergeant	Korea	July 9, 1953	Squad leader
H. J. Smith †	Marine Corps	First Lieutenant	Seoul, Korea	September 24, 1950	Company commander
Loren R. Smith	Marine Corps	First Lieutenant	near Yudam-ni, Korea	November 28, 1950	Company executive officer
Raymond C. Smith	Marine Corps	Private First Class	Korea	October 6, 1952	
Samuel S. Smith Jr.	Marine Corps	Captain	Chosin Reservoir, Korea	December 6–7, 1950	Company commander
Edward W. Snelling	Marine Corps	Second Lieutenant	Hagaru-ri, Korea	November 28–29, 1950	Mortar section leader
James B. Southall	Marine Corps	Sergeant	Korea	September 14, 1951	Platoon sergeant
Frank Speir	Army	Major	Korea	September 19, 1950	
Charles R. Stapler †	Navy	Commander	North Korea	June 9, 1951	Night fighter pilot
James W. Stephen †	Marine Corps	Sergeant	Korea	October 6, 1952	Squad leader
John W. Stevens II	Marine Corps	Lieutenant Colonel	Chosin Reservoir, Korea	November 27 – December 11, 1950	Battalion commander
Roy L. Stewart	Marine Corps	Private First Class	Korea	July 16–17, 1953	
Cletus H. Stone	Navy	Hospitalman	Korea	September 16, 1951	
Frederick E. Stouffer	Marine Corps	Private First Class	near Koto-ri, Korea	December 8, 1950	Platoon runner
Dale L. Stropes †	Marine Corps	Master Sergeant	near Yudam-ni, Korea	December 2, 1950	Company gunnery sergeant
George S. Sulliman †	Marine Corps	First Lieutenant	near Hill 435, Map’yong-ni, Korea	April 24, 1951	Platoon leader
Allan Sutter	Marine Corps	Lieutenant Colonel	Chosin Reservoir, Korea	November 25 – December 10, 1950	Battalion commander
Oral R. Swigart Jr.	Marine Corps	Captain	Korea	July 24–25, 1953	Company commander

== T–V ==
This along with the †, indicates that the Navy Cross was awarded posthumously

Name	Service	Rank	Place of action	Date of action	Notes
Kenneth E. Taft Jr. †	Marine Corps	Captain	Korea	March 26, 1953	Platoon leader
Robert D. Taplett	Marine Corps	Lieutenant Colonel	Chosin Reservoir, Korea	November 28 – December 10, 1950	Battalion commander
Francis R. Thomas Jr. †	Marine Corps	Private First Class	Korea	October 27, 1952	Fire team leader
Will A. Thompson †	Marine Corps	Staff Sergeant	Korea	October 6, 1952	Platoon sergeant
John W. Thornton	Navy	Lieutenant, Junior Grade	near Wonsan, Korea	March 31, 1951	POW
Gerald G. Tidwell †	Marine Corps	Second Lieutenant	Hungnam, Korea	December 24, 1950	Platoon leader
Donald T. Toland †	Marine Corps	Corporal	Korea	May 28, 1951	Radio operator
Robert F. Touchette	Marine Corps	Sergeant	near Tumae-ri, Korea	May 28, 1952	Squad leader
Alfred D. Trombly	Navy	Hospital Corpsman Third Class	Korea	June 8, 1951	Shielded wounded Marines from shrapnel using his own body, and despite his wounds he continued to render aid
Ernest J. Umbaugh †	Marine Corps	Staff Sergeant	Koto-ri Pass, Korea	December 9, 1950	Platoon sergeant
Earl L. Valentine Jr. †	Marine Corps	Second Lieutenant	Korea	August 25–26, 1952	Platoon leader
Lucian L. Vestal	Marine Corps	First Lieutenant	Korea	May 28, 1951	Platoon leader
Raymond W. Vogel Jr. †	Navy	Commander	near Seoul, Korea	August 19, 1950	Pilot

== W ==
This along with the †, indicates that the Navy Cross was awarded posthumously

Name	Service	Rank	Place of action	Date of action	Notes
Thomas H. Waddill	Navy	Hospitalman	Korea	March 26, 1953	Shielded several wounded Marines from enemy fire with his own body and was seriously wounded. He was later captured as a POW.
Robert C. Wagner	Navy	Hospitalman	Hill 673, Korea	September 7, 1951	
Stephen C. Walter †	Marine Corps	Sergeant	Korea	July 17–18, 1953	Squad leader
Ralph L. Walz †	Marine Corps	Captain	Korea	March 29, 1953	Company commander
Joseph M. Ward	Marine Corps	Sergeant	Korea	September 19, 1950	Leaped into a foxhole and threw an enemy hand grenade out. He was wounded by the explosion but saved the lives of two Marines.
Marvin L. Wasson	Marine Corps	Private First Class	Sudong-ni, Korea	December 10, 1950	Anti-tank gunner
John E. Watson	Marine Corps	Second Lieutenant	Korea	August 12–13, 1952	
Stanley J. Wawrzyniak	Marine Corps	Staff Sergeant	Korea	September 19, 1951	First award, company gunnery sergeant
Stanley J. Wawrzyniak	Marine Corps	Technical Sergeant	Korea	April 16, 1952	Second award
William D. Weisgerber	Marine Corps	Staff Sergeant	Korea	October 2, 1952	Platoon guide
Robley E. West	Marine Corps	Lieutenant Colonel	Korea	April 23–24, 1951	Battalion commander
Jack Westerman	Marine Corps	First Lieutenant	Korea	August 10, 1950	Platoon leader
Roger G. Whear Jr.	Navy	Hospitalman	Korea	August 20, 1952	
E. Royce Williams	Navy	Lieutenant	Sea of Japan, near the coast of north Korea	November 18, 1952	Certificate issued on December 19, 2022 and Awarded on January 20, 2023
Jack V. Williams †	Marine Corps	Corporal	Hagaru-ri, Korea	December 6–7, 1950	Machine gun squad leader. Armed with small arms he retrieved a marine machine gun that the Chinese had over ran and were using on US Marines. After getting other marines set up on the machine gun, he was killed returning to his own.
Leslie C. Williams †	Marine Corps	Second Lieutenant	near Yudam-ni, Korea	December 1, 1950	Platoon leader
Frank E. Wilson	Marine Corps	Captain	near Hwachon Reservoir, Korea	April 13, 1951	Helicopter pilot
Loyd J. Wilson †	Marine Corps	Private First Class	Korea	October 6, 1952	Machine gunner
Wilmot H. Wolf	Marine Corps	Technical Sergeant	Korea	November 24, 1952	Assistant patrol leader
John G. Word	Marine Corps	Second Lieutenant	Korea	September 5–7, 1952	Platoon leader
Vance O. Worster †	Marine Corps	Private First Class	Korea	October 26, 1952	

== X–Z ==
Name	Service	Rank	Place of action	Date of action	Notes
John Yancey	Marine Corps	First Lieutenant	near Yudam-ni, Korea	November 27–28, 1950	Second award (first was in World War II)
George W. Yates †	Marine Corps	First Lieutenant	Korea	April 8–9, 1953	Platoon leader

== See also ==
- List of Korean War Medal of Honor recipients
- List of Navy Cross recipients for World War II
- List of Navy Cross recipients for the Vietnam War
