= Colder Than Hell =

1996 book by Joseph R. Owen

- Author: Joseph R. Owen
- Language: English
- Genre: Memoir
- Publication date: 1996

Colder Than Hell: A Marine Rifle Company at Chosin Reservoir (1996) is a Korean War memoir by U.S. Marine second lieutenant Joseph R. Owen about the Battle of Chosin Reservoir (1950). Owen commanded the mortar platoon for Baker Company, 1st Battalion, 7th Marine Regiment, 1st Marine Division. Owen would receive a Silver Star for events described on 27 November 1950. It includes the actions for which Archie Van Winkle and Ray Davis received the Medal of Honor, and the exploits of Kurt Chew-Een Lee the first Marine officer of Asian descent.

The audiobook version, released in 1999 and narrated by Richard Rohan, was recognized by Publishers Weekly as among the best of the year.
