= Harold S. Roise =

United States Marine Corps officer (1916–1991)

- Born: February 27, 1916; Moscow, Idaho, US
- Died: December 24, 1991 (aged 75) Branford, Connecticut, US
- Buried: Arlington National Cemetery
- Allegiance: United States
- Branch: United States Marine Corps
- Service years: 1939–1965
- Rank: Colonel
- Commands: 2nd Battalion, 5th Marines; 7th Marine Regiment
- Conflicts: World War II; Attack on Pearl Harbor; Battle of Okinawa; Chinese Civil War; Operation Beleaguer; Korean War; Battle of Pusan Perimeter; Battle of Inchon; Second Battle of Seoul; Battle of Chosin Reservoir
- Awards: Navy Cross (2); Silver Star; Legion of Merit; Purple Heart

Harold Sigward Roise (February 27, 1916 – December 24, 1991) was a highly decorated United States Marine Corps colonel. He was the recipient of two Navy Crosses during the Korean War, the United States military's second-highest decoration awarded for valor in combat.

== Early life and career ==
Harold S. Roise was born on February 27, 1916, in Moscow, Idaho. He attended the University of Idaho where he played football and was a three-year letter-winner, an Honorable Mention All-American and Captain in 1938. Upon graduation in 1939, Roise was commissioned as a second lieutenant in the Marine Corps.

On December 7, 1941, Second Lieutenant Roise was stationed on board the USS Maryland in Battleship Row when the Japanese attacked Pearl Harbor. The USS Maryland was slightly damaged and four men were killed.

After the attack, he was placed in charge of the Marine detachment aboard the USS Alabama as the ship conducted operations in the North Atlantic. Roise later participated in the battle of Okinawa in 1945, and the subsequent occupation of China when World War II ended. For his service in China, Roise was awarded the Legion of Merit.

== Korean War ==
When the Korean War broke out, Lieutenant Colonel Roise was made the commanding officer of the 2nd Battalion, 5th Marines, 1st Marine Division. In August 1950, Roise's battalion made up part of the 1st Provisional Marine Brigade during the battle of Pusan Perimeter.

=== Inchon-Seoul campaign ===
On September 15, 1950, Roise's battalion led the amphibious assault during the battle of Inchon. Under heavy fire and in a driving rainstorm, Roise directed his battalion in securing the beachhead and setting up a defensive perimeter. The Marines fought off repeated enemy counterattacks and Roise, constantly under enemy fire, led his men forward over the next several days.

On September 17, after repelling another hostile attack, Roise led his battalion forward eight miles and succeeded in capturing Kimpo Airfield. Quickly setting up a defensive perimeter, Roise's battalion repelled a counterattack of several hundred enemy troops that night and into the early morning hours. For his actions in capturing Kimpo Airfield, Roise was awarded the Silver Star.

Lieutenant Colonel Roise continued leading his battalion in capturing numerous objectives while advancing towards Seoul. Roise's battalion killed over 100 of the enemy and destroyed six tanks during one particularly fierce counterattack, suffering no casualties of his own.

During the battle of Seoul on September 24, Lieutenant Colonel Roise, directing the assault companies in smashing the enemy's main line of resistance outside the city, was wounded when his forward observation post was subjected to a mortar barrage. He refused medical evacuation and directed the evacuation of other wounded Marines. Roise then briefed his executive officer in the situation before receiving medical treatment. Still refusing evacuation, he continued to direct his Marines in the capture of the city. For his actions during the Inchon-Seoul campaign, Lieutenant Colonel Roise was awarded his first Navy Cross.

=== Chosin Reservoir campaign ===
Lieutenant Colonel Roise continued leading his battalion during the advance into North Korea. When the 1st Marine Division was encircled by Chinese forces at Chosin Reservoir on November 27, 1950, they were forced to fight their way out in order to withdraw from North Korea.

Lieutenant Colonel Roise's battalion was in the point position during the defense of Yudam-ni and he led his assault units in an attempt to capture enemy-held terrain during a blizzard. Hastily setting a defensive perimeter, Roise's battalion repelled repeated enemy attacks throughout the night.

On December 1, Lieutenant Colonel Roise's battalion was tasked with covering the rear of the regiment during the withdrawal from Yudam-ni. When the regiment was halted by an enemy roadblock the following morning after a night march in subzero temperatures, Roise formulated and directed an assault which smashed through the roadblock. On December 11, the Marines arrived at Hungnam and were subsequently evacuated. Lieutenant Colonel Roise was awarded his second Navy Cross for his actions during the Chosin Reservoir campaign.

== Later career and life ==
Following the Korean War, Roise served at numerous overseas locations, including Africa, Norway, and Turkey. He also attended the National War College in Washington, D.C. From January to November 1960, Colonel Roise served as the commanding officer of the 7th Marine Regiment. He retired from the Marines in 1965.

Roise moved to Branford, Connecticut, in 1966, where he managed the corporate headquarters building for the Armstrong Rubber Company until 1978. Harold S. Roise died on December 24, 1991, in Branford. He was buried in Arlington National Cemetery.

== See also ==
- List of Navy Cross recipients for the Korean War
- Stanley J. Wawrzyniak

Military offices
| Preceded by Houston Stiff | Commanding Officer of the 7th Marine Regiment; January 5, 1960 – November 21, 1960 | Succeeded by Albert Arsenault |
