= Brooke Nihart =

United States Marine Corps officer (1919–2006)

- Born: Franklin Brooke Nihart; March 16, 1919; Los Angeles, California, US
- Died: August 30, 2006 (aged 87) Falls Church, Virginia, US
- Buried: Arlington National Cemetery
- Allegiance: United States of America
- Branch: California National Guard; United States Marine Corps
- Service years: 1940–1966; 1973
- Rank: Colonel
- Commands: 2nd Battalion, 1st Marines; 7th Marine Regiment
- Conflicts: World War II; Battle of Okinawa; Operation Beleaguer; Korean War; Battle of the Punchbowl
- Awards: Navy Cross; Bronze Star w/ Combat "V" (2); Air Medal
- Other work: Deputy Director for Marine Corps Museums

Franklin Brooke Nihart (March 16, 1919 – August 30, 2006) was a highly decorated United States Marine Corps colonel. He was awarded the Navy Cross during the Korean War, and he later wrote the Code of Conduct and oversaw the development of several Marine Corps museums. A two-war veteran, Colonel Nihart was a noted military historian, weapons expert, and military museum director.

== Early life and World War II ==
F. Brooke Nihart was born on March 16, 1919, in Los Angeles, California. While he was still in high school, he joined the California National Guard. He was commissioned a second lieutenant in the United States Marine Corps after graduating from Occidental College with a degree in political science and economics in 1940, having completed the Marine Corps' Platoon Leaders Class during the summers of 1938 and 1939. Immediately assigned active duty, he graduated from The Basic School in January 1941, then located in Philadelphia.

Short assignments in infantry units followed before the outbreak of World War II. Lieutenant Nihart then served as a gunnery officer on board the aircraft carrier USS Saratoga (CV-3), when it unsuccessfully tried to assist Wake Island immediately after Pearl Harbor in December 1941. That was followed by other shipboard and infantry-amphibious training assignments and schooling. He taught both U.S. Marine and Army units amphibious landing tactics at Toop Training Unit in Coronado. From April to June 1945, Major Nihart served as the executive officer of 1st Battalion, 1st Marines during the battle of Okinawa. Following that, he was assigned to the forces in North China.

== Korean War ==
In August 1951, Lieutenant Colonel Nihart took command of 2nd Battalion, 1st Marines, 1st Marine Division weeks prior to fighting in the last division offensive of the Korean War. Starting September 12, Nihart led his battalion in a four day fight for Hill 749 at the Battle of the Punchbowl. Initially reported to be seized by an adjacent battalion due to a map reading error, Hill 749 was in fact not seized and proved to be the main line of resistance for an entire North Korean regiment, which had been improving its positions for months. The Marines of 2/1, thinking a passage of lines with friendly forces on 749 was imminent, instead encountered a storm of defensive fire from well entrenched, mutually supporting positions armed with artillery, mortars, and enfilading machine gun fire from the enemy's east and west flanks on ridges. The Marines would eventually clear and hold 749, but at significant expense. Records indicate that the highest number of casualties in a single company during a 24-hour period in Korea was 92, suffered by 2/1's Easy Company on 13 September. These casualties would become the first to be medically evacuated by helicopter in combat history as part of Operation WINDMILL.

Throughout the night of September 15 and into the next morning, Nihart led his battalion in repulsing numerous enemy attacks and was able to maintain a defensive perimeter despite heavy casualties among his Marines. The NKPA hurricane barrage, according to the Division report, “Reached an intensity that was estimated to surpass that of any barrage yet encountered by the 1st Marine Division in Korea.” The battle was so fierce that a Marine from Nihart's battalion, Corporal Joseph Vittori, single-handedly killed 200 of the enemy with a machine gun before he was killed. Vittori was later awarded the Medal of Honor. Nihart himself was awarded the Navy Cross for his actions during the battle.

In 1953, Nihart served on the Department of Defense's Advisory Committee on Prisoners of War. The committee discovered an alarming trend where prisoners of war revealed military secrets to their captors after undergoing brainwashing. Nihart was tasked with writing a code of conduct to prevent future American prisoners from revealing secrets. He ultimately wrote six articles, which President Dwight D. Eisenhower signed into law with an executive order on August 17, 1955.

== Later career and life ==
In 1959, Nihart served as a military attaché to the U.S. embassy in Rangoon, Burma. From October 1961 to July 1963, he was the commanding officer of the 7th Marine Regiment at Camp Pendleton, California, where he established a regimental history program. Nihart also frequently wrote articles for the Marine Corps Gazette. Colonel Nihart retired from the Marines in 1966 and moved to McLean, Virginia.

Nihart served on the Commandant's Advisory Committee on Marine Corps History from 1968 to 1971. After serving as the managing editor for Armed Forces Journal, he was briefly recalled to active duty in 1973 to serve as the Deputy Director for Marine Corps Museums. Despite leaving the service again, he continued to fill the position as Deputy Director as a civilian, establishing the Marine Corps Museum at Washington Navy Yard in 1977. The following year he opened the Marine Corps Air-Ground Museum at Marine Corps Base Quantico, Virginia. Nihart retired as Deputy Director in 1992 and was awarded the Distinguished Service Award by the Marine Corps Historical Foundation.

Nihart was instrumental in preparing the opening of the National Museum of the Marine Corps in Triangle, Virginia, acquiring many of the vehicles and aircraft which were to be featured. He died of heart and kidney trouble on August 30, 2006, at Inova Fairfax Hospital in Falls Church Virginia. The National Museum of the Marine Corps opened just a few months later on November 10, 2006. Nihart was buried in Arlington National Cemetery.

== See also ==
- List of Navy Cross recipients for the Korean War

Military offices
Preceded by Albert Arsenault	Commanding Officer of the 7th Marine Regiment; October 28, 1961 – July 8, 1963	Succeeded by Robert H. Twisdale
