= Marine Air Detachment =

- Active: -present
- Allegiance: United States Marine Corps
- Garrison/HQ: Naval Air Station Patuxent River
- Nickname(s): MAD
- Equipment: Aircraft
- Website: https://www.aviation.marines.mil/Units/MAD-Patuxent-River/

Commanders
- Colonel: Justin W. Eggstaff
- Major: Joseph E. Taylor
- Sergeant: Major Jacob H. Rozelle

Aircraft flown
- Attack: av-8b harrier, V-22 OSPREY
- Electronic warfare: EA-6B Prowler, Pioneer UAV
- Fighter: F/A-18 Hornet, F-35 Joint Strike Fighter
- Attack helicopter: ah-1w cobra
- Utility helicopter: CH-46 Sea Knight, CH-53 Stallion role, uh-1n huey role
- Transport: kc-130 hercules

Marine Air Detachment (MAD) is a unit in the United States Marine Corps which works in naval aviation operations. The unit is based in Naval Air Station Patuxent River.
