= John W. Antonelli =

USMC Navy Cross recipient

John William Antonelli
- Born: May 30, 1917; Lawrence, Massachusetts, U.S.
- Died: March 26, 1999 (aged 81) Norwood, Massachusetts, U.S.
- Buried: Westwood, Massachusetts
- Allegiance: United States of America
- Branch: United States Marine Corps
- Service years: 1940–1968
- Rank: Brigadier General
- Commands: 2nd Battalion, 27th Marines; 4th Marine Regiment; Marine Corps Base Quantico
- Conflicts: World War II: Battle of Tulagi; Guadalcanal campaign; Battle of Iwo Jima; Occupation of Japan
- Awards: Navy Cross; Legion of Merit; Purple Heart

John William Antonelli (May 30, 1917 – March 26, 1999) was a highly decorated United States Marine Corps brigadier general. He was awarded the Navy Cross during the battle of Iwo Jima in World War II.

== Early life and World War II ==
John W. Antonelli was born on May 30, 1917, in Lawrence, Massachusetts. In 1940, he was commissioned as a second lieutenant in the Marine Corps upon graduating from the United States Naval Academy in Annapolis, Maryland.

=== Marine Raiders ===
Antonelli was initially assigned to the 1st Battalion, 5th Marines. Soon after the United States entered World War II, 1/5 was re-designated as the 1st Separate Battalion in January 1942, and then re-designated again as the 1st Marine Raider Battalion the following month. First Lieutenant Antonelli deployed to Samoa with the 1st Marine Raider Battalion in April.

In May, Antonelli was promoted to captain. He then led a raider company during the battles of Tulagi and Guadalcanal from August to October 1942. When the Marine Raider Battalions were disbanded in early 1944, Major Antonelli was assigned as the commanding officer of the newly activated 2nd Battalion, 27th Marines, 5th Marine Division.

=== Battle of Iwo Jima ===
On February 19, 1945, Major Antonelli led his battalion in the amphibious landing on Red Beach One at Iwo Jima in the Volcano Islands. On March 9, his battalion became pinned down by heavy enemy fire and was unable to advance. Antonelli moved forward of the front lines to observe the enemy and was wounded. He was evacuated to a field hospital after completing his mission and issuing the orders necessary for his Marines to resume the assault.

Despite his wounds, Major Antonell left the field hospital on two occasions to return to his battalion and lead his Marines in further combat. He was later evacuated to a hospital ship on March 16 in order to prevent his wounds from becoming more infected. For his actions during the battle, Major Antonelli was awarded the Navy Cross.

In May, Antonelli was promoted to lieutenant colonel. He later took part in the occupation of Japan after the war ended.

== Later career and life ==
Antonelli later served as the executive officer of the Marine barracks in Boston, Massachusetts, and then became an instructor at the Naval Academy from 1947 to 1950. In 1953, he graduated from the Senior Course at Marine Corps Base Quantico, Virginia.

In 1956 he acted as the technical adviser to the film The Proud and Profane.

In July 1959, Colonel Antonelli took command of the 4th Marine Regiment, 1st Marine Expeditionary Brigade, at Kaneohe Bay, Hawaii. While at Kaneohe Bay, his wife, Lillian, served as the president of the Kaneohe Officers' Wives Club. Antonelli held command of the 4th Marines until August 1961, when he was assigned to Headquarters, Fleet Marine Force, Pacific.

He later attended the National War College in Washington, D.C., before he was assigned to the Office of the Joint Chiefs of Staff. From January to December 1967, Brigadier General Antonelli implemented a revised long range concept for the Marine Corps while he was the chairman of the long range study program. He then served as the commanding general of Marine Corps Base Quantico from January to September 1968. During his tenure, he oversaw the reorganization of the Marine Corps School into the Marine Corps Development and Education Command. Antonelli was awarded the Legion of Merit once he was relieved of his command and retired on September 30, 1968.

John W. Antonelli died on March 26, 1999, in Norwood, Massachusetts. He was buried in Westwood.

== See also ==
- List of Navy Cross recipients for World War II

Military offices
Preceded by Charles J. Bailey Jr.	Commanding Officer of the 4th Marine Regiment; July 7, 1959 – August 1, 1961	Succeeded by Allan Sutter
