= Battle of Chosin Reservoir order of battle =

List of participated units

Battle of Chosin Reservoir order of battle is a list of the significant units that fought in the Battle of Chosin Reservoir between November 27, 1950 and December 13, 1950.

== United Nations Command forces – GA Douglas MacArthur ==
=== X Corps – MG Edward Mallory "Ned" Almond ===
==== USMC units ====
1st Marine Division – MajGen Oliver Prince Smith

Assistant Division Commander – BGen Edward A. Craig
Forward Command Post – Col. Gregon A. Williams, Chief of Staff
Deputy Chief of Staff – Col. Edward W. Snedeker
Personnel Officer (G-1) – Harvey S. Walseth
Intelligence Officer (G-2) – Col. Bankson T. Holcomb Jr.
Operations Officer (G-3) – Col. Alpha L. Bowser
Logistics Officer (G-4) – Col. Francis M. McAlister
1st Military Police Company – Capt. John H. Griffin
1st Reconnaissance Company – Maj. Walter Gall
41 Commando Royal Marines (attached) – Maj. Dennis Aldridge, RM vice LCol. Douglas B. Drysdale, RM (WIA 29Nov50)

1st Marine Regiment (RCT-1) – Col. Lewis B. Puller

Antitank Company, 1st Marines – Capt. George E. Petro
4.2" Mortar Company, 1st Marines – Capt. Frank J. Faureck
H&S Company, 1st Marines – Capt. Frank P. Tatum
1st Battalion 1st Marines – LCol. Donald M. Schmuck
2nd Battalion 1st Marines – LCol. Allan Sutter
3rd Battalion 1st Marines – LCol. Thomas L. Ridge (Concurrent commander, Hagaru-ri Defense Force)
G Company, 3rd Bn, 1st Marines (attached, Task Force Drysdale) – Capt. Carl L. Sitter, MOH

5th Marine Regiment (RCT-5) – LCol. Raymond L. Murray

Antitank Company, 5th Marines – Capt. Rex O. Dillo
4.2" Mortar Company, 5th Marines – 1Lt. Robert M. Lucy
H&S Company, 5th Marines – Capt. Jack Hawthorn
1st Battalion 5th Marines – LCol. John W. Stevens II
2nd Battalion 5th Marines – LCol. Harold S. Roise
3rd Battalion 5th Marines – LCol. Robert D. Taplett

7th Marine Regiment (RCT-7) – Col. Homer L. Litzenberg

Antitank Company, 7th Marines – 1Lt. Earl R. Delong vice Maj. Walter T. Warren (WIA 8Dec50)
4.2" Mortar Company, 7th Marines – Maj. Rodney V. Reighard
H&S Company, 7th Marines – Maj Rodney V. Reighard (concurrent) vice Maj. Walter T. Warren (WIA 8Dec50)
1st Battalion 7th Marines – Maj. Webb D. Sawyer vice LCol. Raymond G. Davis, MOH (trnf 8Dec50)
2nd Battalion 7th Marines – LCol. Randolph S. D. Lockwood
3rd Battalion 7th Marines – Maj. Warren Morris vice LCol. William F. Harris (MIA 6Dec50)

11th Marine Regiment – Col. Carl A. Youngdale vice Col. James H. Brower (NBC 30Nov50)

Headquarters Battery, 11th Marines – 1Lt. William C. Patton
Service Battery, 11th Marines – 1Lt. Joseph M. Brent
C Battery, 4.5" Rocket Battalion, FMFPAC (attached) – 1Lt Eugene A. Bushe
1st Battalion 11th Marines (105mm) (detached to RCT-5) – LCol. Harvey A. Feehan
2nd Battalion 11th Marines (105mm) (detached to RCT-1) – LCol. Merritt Adelman
3rd Battalion 11th Marines (105mm) (detached to RCT-7) – LCol Francis F. Perry
4th Battalion 11th Marines (155mm) (one battery detached to each RCT) – Maj. William McReynolds

1st Motor Transport Battalion, 1st Marine Division – Lt. Col. Olin L. Beall

A Company, 7th Motor Transport Battalion, FMFPAC (attached) – Capt. Ira N. Hayes

Elements, 1st Tank Battalion, 1st Marine Division – LCol. Harry T. Milne

B Company, 1st Tank Battalion – Capt. Bruce F. Williams
D Company, 1st Tank Battalion (attached to Task Force Drysdale) – Capt. Bruce W. Clarke

1st Amphibian Tractor Battalion (less detachments) – LCol. Erwin F. Wann, Jr.
1st Engineer Battalion, 1st Marine Division (less detachments) – LCol. John H. Partridge
1st Medical Battalion, 1st Marine Division – Cdr. Howard A. Johnson, USN
1st Ordnance Battalion, 1st Marine Division (detachments to each RCT) – Maj. Lloyd O. Williams
1st Service Battalion, 1st Marine Division (detachments to each RCT) – LCol. Charles L. Banks
1st Shore Party Battalion, 1st Marine Division – LCol. Henry P. Crowe
1st Signal Battalion, 1st Marine Division (detachments to each RCT) – Maj. Robert L. Schreier
ROK 1st Marine Regiment
ROK Police Hwarang Unit

Marine Aircraft Group 33 – Col Frank C. Dailey {Operational Control to X Corps from Fifth Air Force Joint Operations Center 4 November to 24 December 1950}

VMO-6 – Maj Vincent J. Gottschalk
VMR-152 – LtCol Deane C. Roberts
VMF-212 – LtCol Richard W. Wyczawski
VMF-214 – Maj William M. Lundin
VMF-312 – LtCol Frank Cole
VMF-323 – Maj Arnold L. Lund
VMF(N)-513 – LtCol David C. Wolfe
VMF(AW)-542 – LtCol Max J. Volcansek
MTACS-2 – Maj Christian C. Lee

==== US Army units ====
3rd Infantry Division – MG Robert Soule

Assistant Division Commander – BGEN Armistead D. Mead
3rd Division Artillery – BGEN Roland P. Shugg
Chief of Staff – COL Oliver P. Newman
7th Infantry Regiment – COL John S. Guthrie

1st Battalion – LTC Charles Heinrich
2nd Battalion – MAJ Samuel G. Kail
3rd Battalion – LTC Thomas O'Neill {Col Guthrie provided 3rd Battalion (LTC O'Neill) to Task Force Dog (BG Mead) as rear guard for the 1st MARDIV from Chinhung-ni to Majon-dong}
10th Armored Field Artillery Battalion – LTC Walter A. Downing

15th Infantry Regiment – COL Dennis M. Moore

1st Battalion – LTC Robert M. Blanchard Jr.
2nd Battalion – LTC Allen Peck
3rd Battalion – LTC Edward Farrell
58th Armored Field Artillery Battalion – LTC Harry A. Stella

65th Infantry Regiment – COL William W. Harris

1st Battalion – LTC Howard St. Clair
2nd Battalion – LTC Herman Dammer
3rd Battalion – MAJ E.G. Allen
39th Armored Field Artillery Battalion – LTC Robert B. Neely
Company B, 10th Engineer Combat Battalion
Company D, 10th Engineer Combat Battalion

KATUSA - See Republic of Korea Forces below.

7th Infantry Division – MG David G. Barr,

Assistant Division Commander – BGEN Henry I. Hodes
Chief of Staff – COL Louis T. Heath
7th Division Artillery – BGEN Homer W. Kiefer

7th Division Artillery Hq Battery
31st Field Artillery Battalion – LTC George P. Welch
48th Field Artillery Battalion – LTC Ulrich G. Gibbons
49th Field Artillery Battalion
51st Field Artillery Battalion

17th Infantry Regiment – COL Herbert B. Powell

Headquarters Company, 17th Infantry Regiment
1st Battalion, 17th Infantry Regiment

31st Infantry Regiment – COL Allan D. MacLean

2nd Battalion, 31st Infantry Regiment – LTC Richard F. Reidy

Regimental Combat Team 31 aka Task Force MacLean/Task Force Faith

Heavy Mortar Company, 31st Infantry Regiment – CPT Fields E. Shelton
Medical Company, 31st Infantry Regiment
Tank Company, 31st Infantry Regiment – CPT Robert E. Drake
1st Battalion, 31st Infantry Regiment – {"B" Company (CPT Charles L. Peckham) part of Task Force Drysdale}
3rd Battalion, 31st Infantry Regiment – LTC William Reilly
1st Battalion, 32nd Infantry Regiment – LTC Don Faith (Attached to 31st RCT)
Battery D, 15th Antiaircraft Artillery Automatic Weapons Battalion {one Platoon}
Batteries A and B, 57th Field Artillery Battalion

32nd Infantry Regiment – COL Charles E. Beauchamp

1st Battalion, 32nd Infantry Regiment – LTC Don Faith {attached to Regimental Combat Team 31}
3rd Battalion, 32nd Infantry Regiment – LTC Heinrich Schumann

KATUSA - See Republic of Korea Forces below.

==== Task Force Drysdale ====
41 Independent Commando Royal Marines – LTC Douglas B. Drysdale {attached to the US 1st Marine Division}

Headquarters Troops
Company B, 1st Battalion, 31st Infantry Regiment, 7th Infantry Division, US
Company D, 1st Tank Battalion (USMC)
Company G, 1st Marine Regiment

==== Task Force Dog ====
(2 through 11 December 1950)

BG Armistead D. Mead

Detachment Headquarters (HQ), 3d Infantry Division (United States) (and a detachment from the tactical command post)
3rd Battalion, 7th Infantry Regiment
92nd Armored Field Artillery Battalion (Self-propelled [SP] 155mm howitzers)
52nd Truck Transportation Battalion
Company A, 10th Engineer Combat Battalion
Company A, 73rd Engineer Combat Battalion
3rd Platoon, 3rd Reconnaissance Company
HQ Detachment, 3d Antiaircraft Artillery (AAA), Automatic Weapons (AW) Battalion (SP)
Detachment, 3rd Division Ordnance Bomb Disposal Unit
Detachment, 3rd Signal Company
Detachment, Tactical Air Control Party
Company G, 65th RCT General Support
999th Field Artillery Battalion, General Support Reinforcing (GSR)

=== Far East Air Forces – LTG George Stratemeyer ===
Fifth Air Force – MG Earle Partridge

374th Troop Carrier Wing – BG John Henebry

21st Troop Carrier Squadron
61st Troop Carrier Squadron

=== US Seventh Fleet – VADM Arthur D. Struble ===
Task Force 77
Task Force 90

=== Non-US Units ===
==== United Kingdom forces ====
41 Independent Commando Royal Marines – LTC Douglas B. Drysdale {attached to the US 1st Marine Division}

==== Republic of Korea forces ====
ROK I Corps – MG Kim Pac-iI {not directly involved in the battle of Chosin Reservoir, but part of X Corps organization north of the 38th Parallel}

ROK 3rd Division – BG Rhee Chong-chan
ROK Capital Division – BG Song Yo-chan

ROK Police Hwarang Unit{attached to the US 1st Marine Division}
Student Volunteer Force of Koreans In Japan{attached to the US 3rd Infantry Division and US 7th Infantry Division}

==== Greece forces ====
RHAF Transport Flight {attached to U.S. Air Force 21st Troop Carrier Squadron}

== People's Republic of China forces ==
=== 9th Army Group – Commander and Commissar Song Shi-Lun ===
20th Corps – Commander and Commissar Zhang Yixiang(张翼翔), Deputy Commander Liao Zhengguo(廖政国)

58th Division – Commander and Commissar Huang Chaotian(黄朝天)

172nd Regiment (Note: All regiment information are taken from Ryan, Mark A.; Finkelstein, David M.; McDevitt, Michael A. (2003). Chinese warfighting: The PLA experience since 1949. Armonk, New York: M.E. Sharpe. p. 121. ISBN 0-7656-1087-6.)
173rd Regiment
174th Regiment

59th Division – Commander and Commissar Dai Kelin(戴克林)

175th Regiment
176th Regiment
177th Regiment

60th Division – Commander Chen Ting(陈挺)

178th Regiment
179th Regiment
180th Regiment

89th Division (Attached to 20th Corps from 30th Corps) – Commander Yu Guangmao(余光茂)

265th Regiment
266th Regiment
270th Regiment

26th Corps – Commander Zhang Renchu(张仁初), Commissar Li Yaowen

76th Division – Commander Gao Wenran(高文然)

226th Regiment
227th Regiment
228th Regiment

77th Division – Commander Wang Jianqing(王建青)

229th Regiment
230th Regiment
231st Regiment

78th Division (Note: Did not arrive in time to join the battle.) – Commander Chen Zhongmei(陈忠梅)

232nd Regiment
233rd Regiment
234th Regiment

88th Division (Attached to 26th Corps from 30th Corps) – Commander Wu Dalin(吴大林)

262nd Regiment
263rd Regiment
264th Regiment

27th Corps – Commander Peng Deqing(彭德清), Commissar Liu Haotian(刘浩天)

79th Division – Commander Xiao Jinghai(肖镜海)

235th Regiment
236th Regiment
237th Regiment

80th Division – Commander Zhan Danan(詹大南)

238th Regiment
239th Regiment
240th Regiment

81st Division – Commander Sun Duanfu(孙端夫)

241st Regiment
242nd Regiment
243rd regiment

94th Division (Note: Misidentified as the 90th Division by UN intelligence.) (Attached to 27th Corps from 30th Corps) – Commander Wu Lanting(邬兰亭)

280th Regiment
281st Regiment
182nd Regiment

== Notable US participants and battle honors awarded ==
=== US Marine Corps ===
- Major General Oliver Smith, in command of the 1st Marine Division, awarded the Distinguished Service Cross.
- Brigadier General Chesty Puller, in command of the 1st Marine Regiment, was awarded a (fifth) Navy Cross.
- Col Homer Litzenberg, in command of the 7th Marine Regiment was awarded the Navy Cross.
- Col Raymond Murray, in command of the 5th Marine Regiment, was awarded the Navy Cross.
- Col Robert Taplett, in command of 3rd Battalion 5th Marines, was awarded the Navy Cross.
- Lt. Col Charles L. Banks, in command of 1st Service Battalion, was awarded the Navy Cross
- Lt. Col Olin Beall, awarded the Distinguished Service Cross for rescuing survivors of RCT 31.
- Lt. Col Ray Davis, in command of the 1st Battalion 7th Marines, was awarded the Medal of Honor.
- Lt. Col William Frederick Harris, in command of the 3rd Battalion 7th Marines posthumously awarded Navy Cross.
- Lt. Col Harold S. Roise, in command of 2nd Battalion 5th Marines, was awarded a (second) Navy Cross
- Captain William E. Barber, in command of Fox Company 2nd Battalion 7th Marines, awarded the Medal of Honor.
- Captain John H. Chafee, company commander 7th Marines, later became Governor of Rhode Island, Secretary of the Navy and a United States Senator.
- Captain Morse L. Holladay, in command of Headquarters Company, 1st Service Battalion, 1st Marine Division (Reinforced), awarded Navy Cross
- Captain Milton A. Hull, in command of Dog Company 2nd Battalion 7th Marines, awarded the Navy Cross.
- Captain Charles D. Mize, in command of George Company, 3rd Battalion 5th Marines, was awarded the Navy Cross and Bronze Star Medal
- Captain Edward Stamford, awarded the Silver Star for actions as the Marine forward air controller of RCT 31. He initially was recommended for the Medal of Honor.
- Captain Myron E. Thomas, Jr – pilot with VMF-115 that was awarded the Navy Cross
- 1st Lt Joseph Ronald "Bull" Fisher, in command of Item Company, 3rd Battalion, 1st Marines, awarded Navy Cross
- SSgt Robert Kennemore, 2nd Bn, 7th Marines, awarded the Medal of Honor.
- SSgt William G. Windrich, Co I, 3rd Bn, 5th Marines, posthumously awarded the Medal of Honor and Purple Heart.
- Sgt James E. Johnson, Co J, 3rd Bn, 7th Marines, posthumously awarded the Medal of Honor and Purple Heart.
- PFC Hector A. Cafferata, Jr., 2nd Bn, 7th Marines, awarded Medal of Honor.
- PFC Marvin "Pete" Wasson,, Anti-Tank Co, 1st Marine Division (reinforced), awarded the Navy Cross

=== US Army ===
- Brigadier General Henry I. Hodes, Assistant Commander, 7th Infantry Division.
- Col. Allan D. MacLean, Commanded all US Army troops East of the Reservoir, posthumously awarded the Distinguished Service Cross for actions as Commander of RCT 31 east of the Reservoir (Task Force Maclean).
- Lt Col. Don Faith, posthumously awarded the Medal of Honor for actions as a commander of RCT 31 (Task Force Faith).
- Lt Col. John Page, X Corps Artillery, was posthumously awarded the Medal of Honor for actions at Koto-ri and during the breakout.
- Major Robert E. Jones, S-3 of 1/32 Inf., awarded Distinguished Service Cross for actions east of Reservoir (RCT 31).
- Major Harvey Storms, 3/31 Inf was posthumously awarded the Silver Star.
- Captain Earle H. Jordan, M/31, awarded Distinguished Service Cross for actions east of Reservoir (RCT 31).
- Captain George R. Cody, HMC 31 Inf., posthumously awarded Distinguished Service Cross for actions east of the Reservoir (RCT 31).
- 2nd Lt. James C. Barnes, 48 FAB and FO to 1/32 Inf., awarded Distinguished Service Cross for actions during breakout.
- Lt. Alfred J. Anderson, B/31, awarded Distinguished Service Cross for actions at Hell's Fire Valley.
- Lt. John E. Gray, M/31, awarded Distinguished Service Cross for actions east of Reservoir (RCT 31).
- Lt Alexander Haig, later promoted to general and served as Supreme Allied Commander Europe and United States Secretary of State.
- Lt. Robert G. Schmitt, M/31, posthumously awarded Distinguished Service Cross for actions east of Reservoir (RCT 31).
- Lt. Cecil G. Smith, A/32, awarded Distinguished Service Cross for actions during breakout.
- Sgt. Harold P. Haugland, D/15 AAA Bn., awarded Distinguished Service Cross for actions east of Reservoir (RCT 31).
- Sgt. Charles Garrigus, 1/32 Inf., posthumously awarded Distinguished Service Cross for actions east of Reservoir (RCT 31).
- Sgt. Stanford O. Corners, Med/A/57 FAB, awarded Distinguished Service Cross for actions east of Reservoir (RCT 31).
- Sgt. George H. Paine, H/31, awarded Distinguished Service Cross for actions at Koto-ri.
- Cpl. James H. Godfrey, D/32 Inf., awarded Distinguished Service Cross for actions east of Reservoir (RCT 31).
