= Don C. Faith Jr. =

United States Army Medal of Honor recipient

Don Carlos Faith Jr.
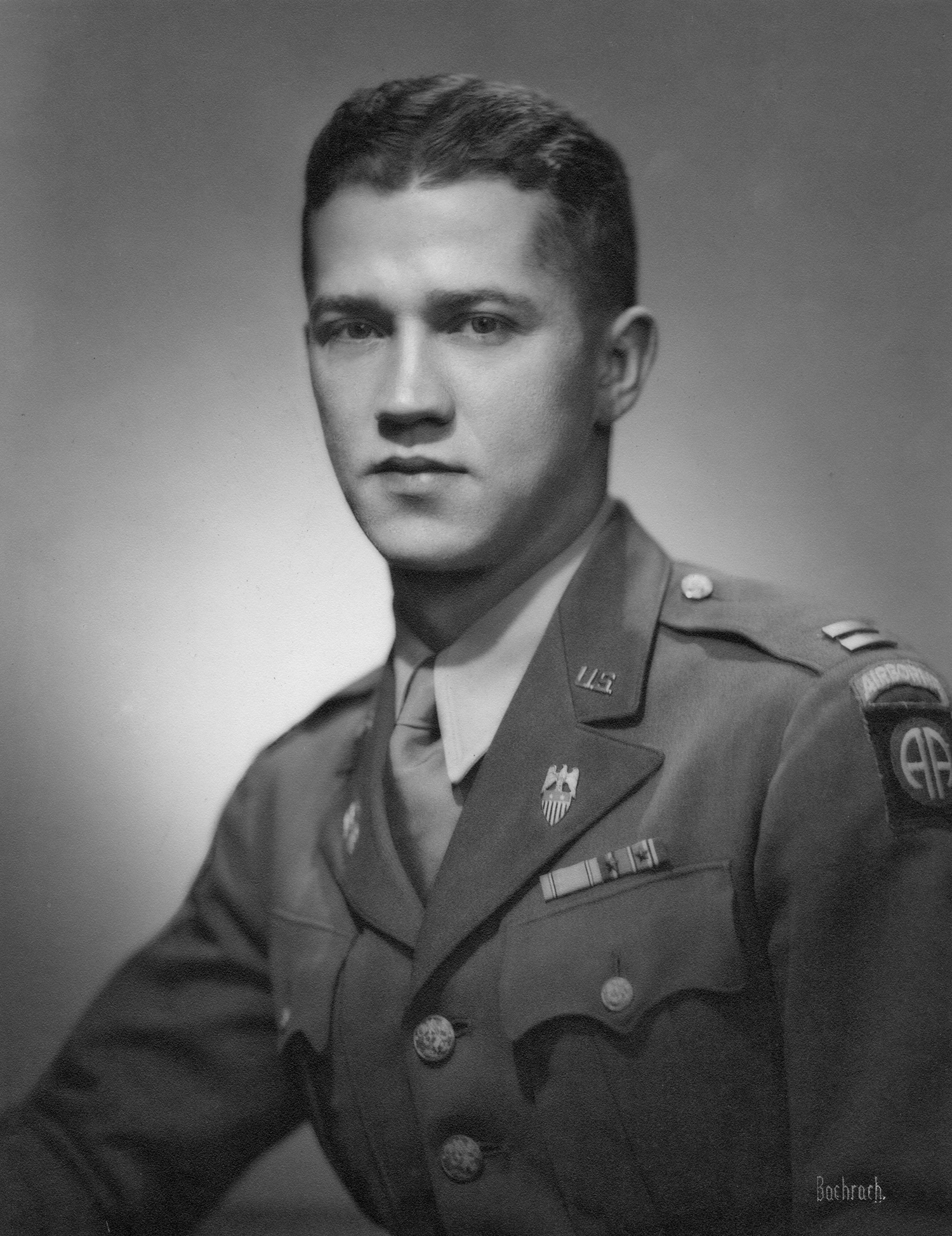
- Captain Don Faith in c. 1943
- Born: August 26, 1918; Washington, Indiana, US
- Died: December 2, 1950 (aged 32); Chosin Reservoir, Korea
- Burial place: Arlington National Cemetery
- Military career
- Allegiance: United States
- Branch: United States Army
- Service years: 1941–1950
- Rank: Lieutenant colonel
- Commands: 1st Battalion, 32nd Infantry Regiment, 7th Infantry Division
- Conflicts: World War II: North African Campaign; Italian Campaign; Western Allied invasion of France; Operation Overlord; Operation Market Garden; Battle of the Bulge; Western Allied invasion of Germany; Korean War: Battle of Pusan Perimeter; Second Phase Offensive; Battle of Chosin Reservoir †
- Awards: Medal of Honor; Silver Star; Bronze Star Medal (3); Purple Heart (2)

Don Carlos Faith Jr. (August 26, 1918 – December 1, 1950) was an officer in the United States Army during World War II and the Korean War. He was posthumously awarded the Medal of Honor for his actions in Korea from November 27 through to December 1, 1950. In 1976 Faith was posthumously inducted into the U.S. Army Officer Candidate School Hall of Fame at Fort Benning, Georgia.

== Early life ==
Faith was born in Washington, Indiana, on 26 August 1918, the son of Brigadier General Don Carlos Faith. He was found medically unfit for admission to United States Military Academy, and instead enrolled at Georgetown University.

== Military career ==
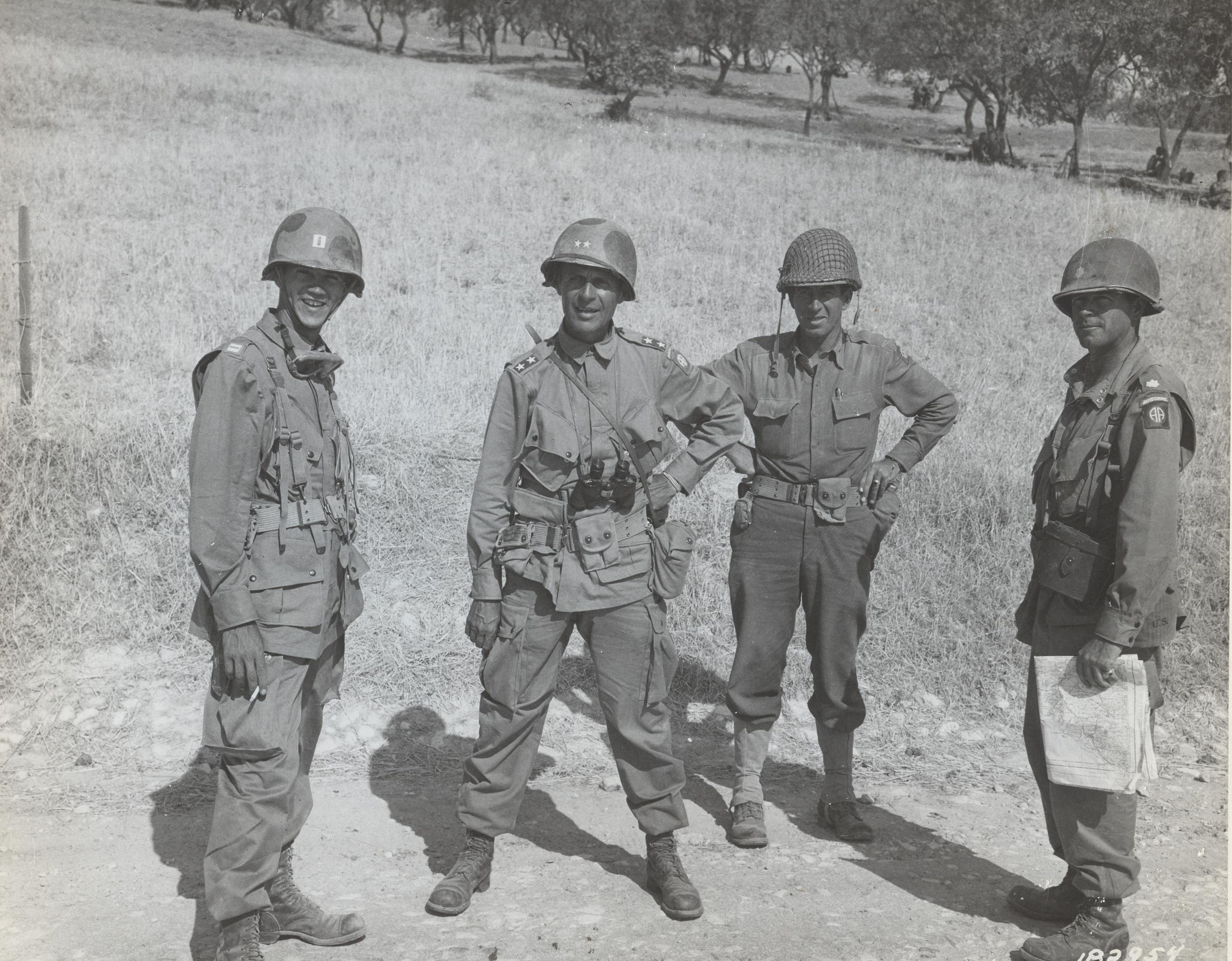
Major General Matthew Ridgway (center) and members of his staff outside Ribera, Sicily, July 25, 1943. To Ridgway's right is his aide, Captain Don C. Faith Jr.

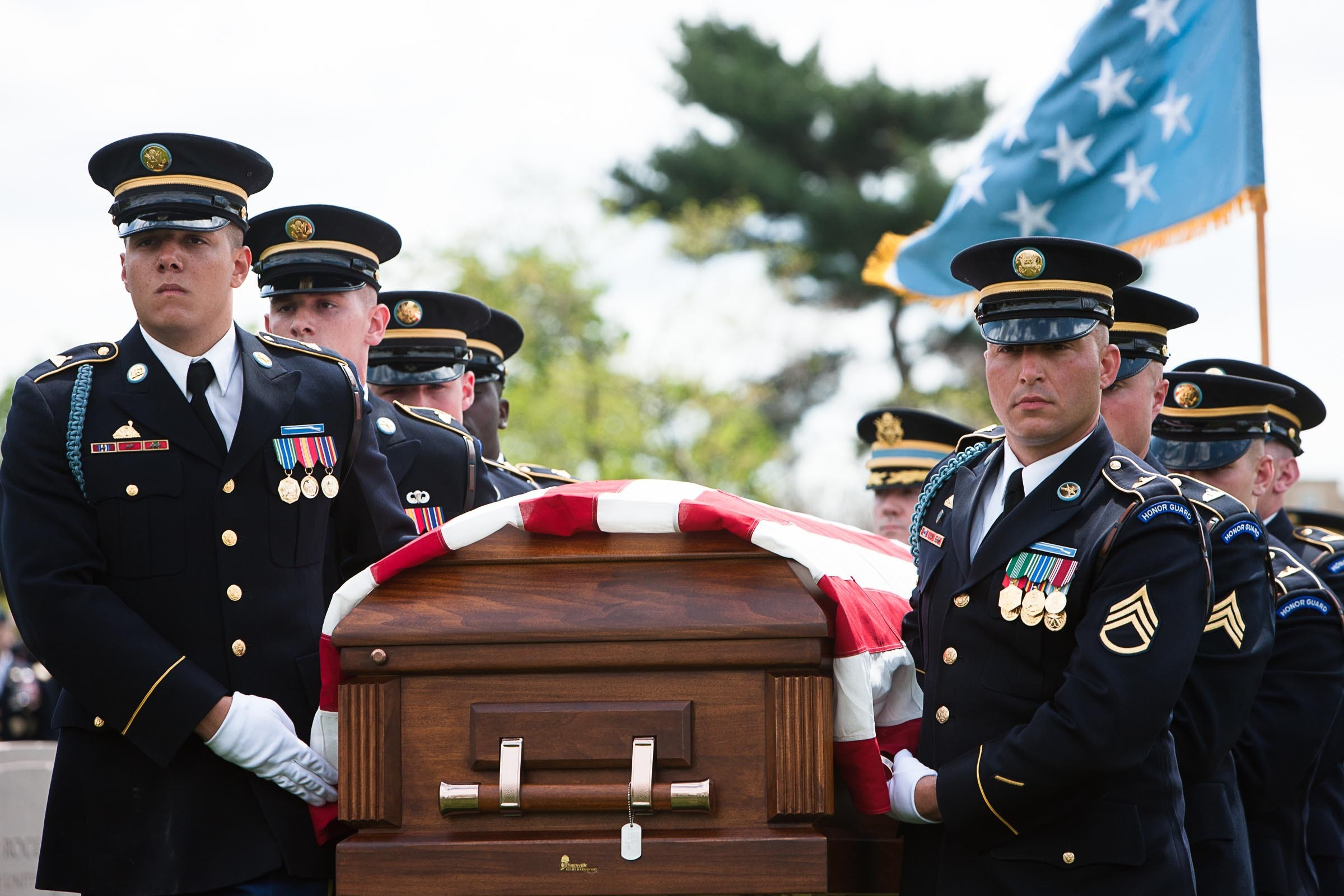
Funeral of Don C. Faith at Arlington National Cemetery (April 17, 2013)

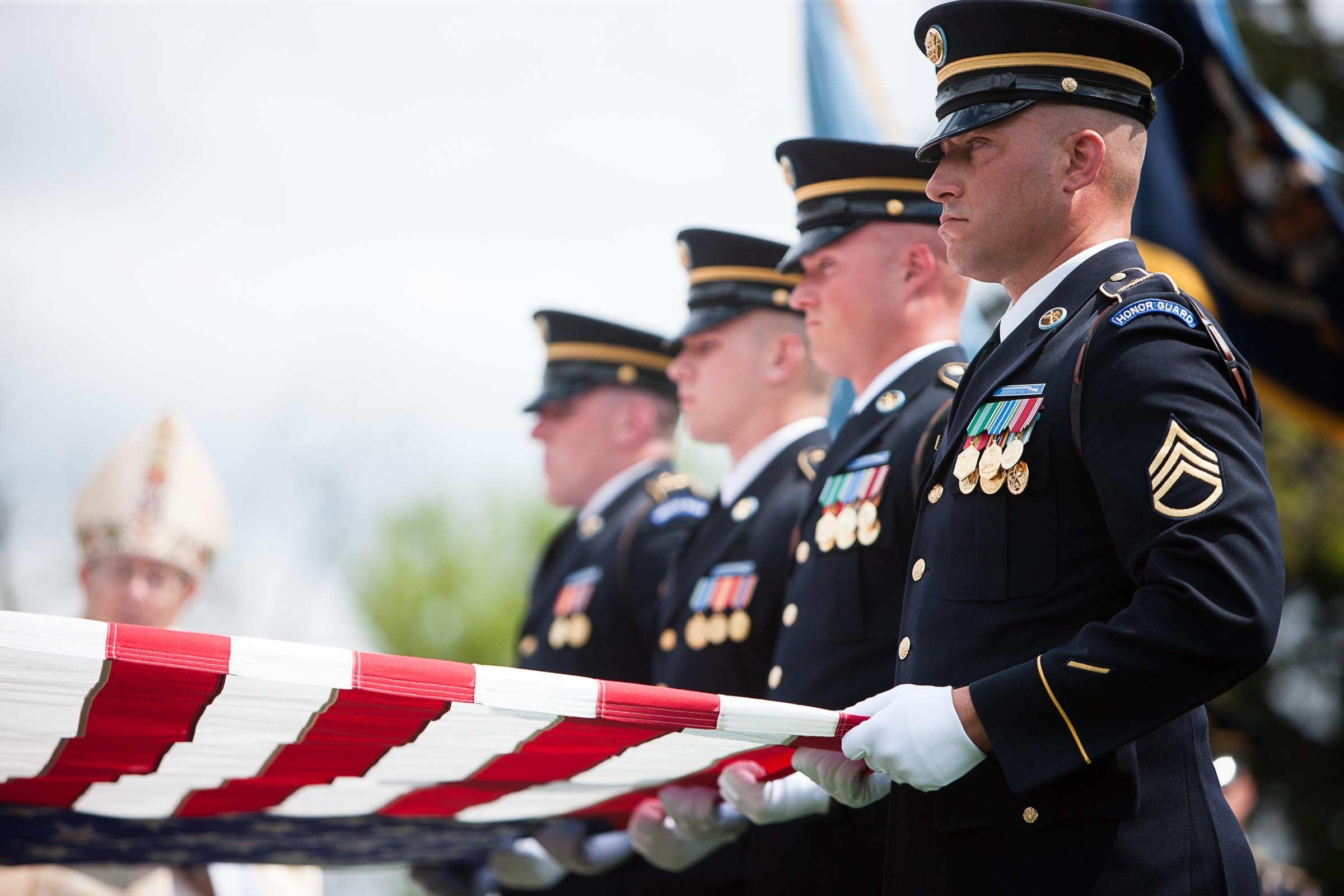
Funeral of Don C. Faith (April 17, 2013)

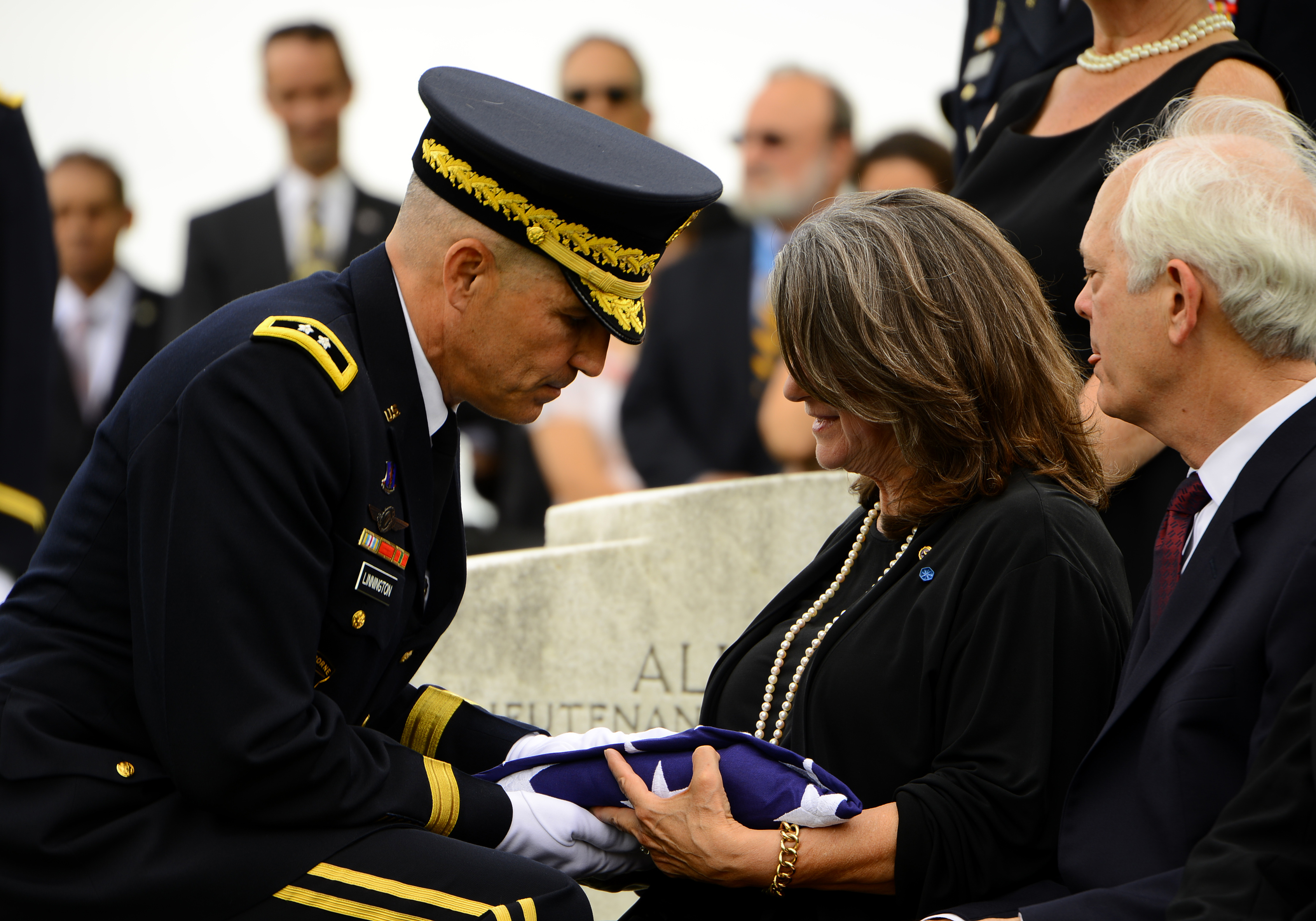
Maj. Gen. Michael S. Linnington gives the flag to the daughter of Don C. Faith Jr. during his funeral at Arlington National Cemetery (April 17, 2013)

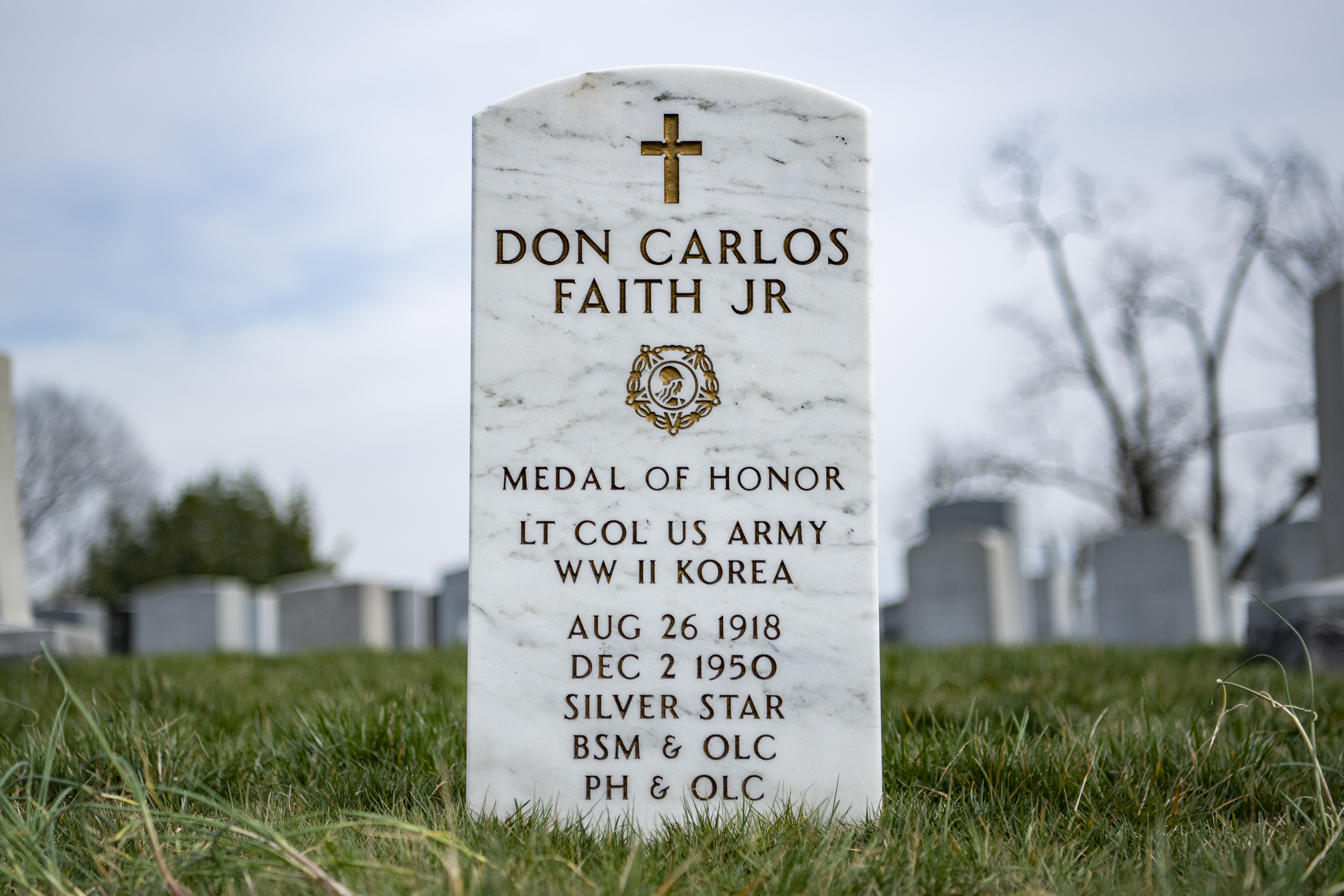
Grave at Arlington National Cemetery

With the United States' entry into World War II approaching, Congress passed the Selective Service Act in 1940. Faith was called in for his draft physical, but was rejected for the same dental disqualification that thwarted his admission to the United States Military Academy. However, Faith was able to successfully appeal the draft board's decision, and he was inducted on June 25, 1941, following graduation from Georgetown University, where he was a brother of Delta Phi Epsilon foreign service fraternity. After completion of Officer Candidate School, he was commissioned on February 26, 1942. Lieutenant Faith was assigned to the 82nd Airborne Division and spent the remainder of the war with the division. He served as both an aide to Brigadier General Matthew Ridgway, commander of the 82nd, from 1942 to 1944, and as a staff officer in the division. In addition to participating in all of the division's combat jumps during the war in North Africa, Italy, France, the Netherlands, and Germany, Faith was awarded two Bronze Star Medals and was promoted to lieutenant colonel, on the staff of Major General Maxwell D. Taylor.

After World War II, Faith served with the military mission in China until it was withdrawn. His next assignment was with the 7th Infantry Division in Japan as a battalion commander. When the war in Korea broke out in 1950, Faith and the 7th Infantry were sent to help stop the invasion of South Korea. Faith was the commander of the 1st Battalion, 32nd Infantry Regiment. The 31st Regimental Combat Team (31st RCT) was part of the force that pushed north with the objective of reaching the Yalu River. The 31st RCT was on the eastern bank of the Chosin Reservoir when the Chinese People's Volunteer Army (PVA) staged a massive attack on the night of November 27, 1950. This began the Battle of Chosin Reservoir that would last until December 13, 1950.

During a desperate drive south by convoy along the only road on December 1, the 31st RCT's commander, Colonel Allan D. MacLean, was killed and so the command of the entire regiment fell to Faith. Later the same day, Faith led an attack against a PVA roadblock, during which he was wounded by a fragmentation grenade. Faith was loaded into the cab of a 2 1/2-ton truck, and with Pfc. Russell L. Barney driving it, was the only truck to get through the last roadblock. As Barney was driving, they were struck by PVA small arms fire at which time Faith was hit again and was killed. At some point Barney had to abandon the truck, leaving Faith's body in the vehicle. Barney made it back to the safety of United Nations lines where he later reported his account. Like all the dead and wounded who were killed by the PVA and left with all the abandoned convoy vehicles, as none of the convoy vehicles made it to safety, Faith was listed as missing in action.

President Harry S. Truman approved the award of the Medal of Honor, posthumously, to Faith. The award was presented to Barbara Faith in Washington, D.C., by General Omar N. Bradley, then chairman of the Joint Chiefs of Staff, in a ceremony on June 21, 1951. The official Department of the Army award and citation were published in its General Order No. 59, 2 August 1951.

Later, Faith's classification was changed to killed in action, body not recovered. After 62 years in this classification, Faith's remains were recovered near the Chosin Reservoir by a Joint Prisoners of War, Missing in Action Accounting Command (JPAC) field recovery team. His remains were identified through DNA and reported to the public by Defense Prisoner Of War – Missing Personnel Office on October 11, 2012. He was buried at Arlington National Cemetery on April 17, 2013, with full military honors.

== Medal of Honor citation ==
General Orders: Department of the Army, General Orders No. 59 (August 2, 1951)
Action Date: November 27 – December 1, 1950
Service: Army
Rank: Lieutenant Colonel
Company: Commanding Officer
Battalion: 1st Battalion
Regiment: 32d Infantry Regiment
Division: 7th Infantry Division

Citation:

The President of the United States of America, in the name of Congress, takes pride in presenting the Medal of Honor (Posthumously) to Lieutenant Colonel (Infantry) Don Carlos Faith Jr. (ASN: O-46673), United States Army, for conspicuous gallantry and intrepidity in action above and beyond the call of duty while Commanding the 1st Battalion, 32d Infantry Regiment, 7th Infantry Division, in action against enemy aggressor forces at Hagaru-ri, (Chosin Reservoir) North Korea, from 27 November to 1 December 1950. When the enemy launched a fanatical attack against his battalion, Lieutenant Colonel Faith unhesitatingly exposed himself to heavy enemy fire as he moved about directing the action. When the enemy penetrated the positions, Lieutenant Colonel Faith personally led counterattacks to restore the position. During an attack by his battalion to effect a junction with another U.S. unit, Lieutenant Colonel Faith reconnoitered the route for, and personally directed, the first elements of his command across the ice-covered reservoir and then directed the movement of his vehicles which were loaded with wounded until all of his command had passed through the enemy fire. Having completed this he crossed the reservoir himself. Assuming command of the force his unit had joined he was given the mission of attacking to join friendly elements to the south. Lieutenant Colonel Faith, although physically exhausted in the bitter cold, organized and launched an attack which was soon stopped by enemy fire. He ran forward under enemy small-arms and automatic weapons fire, got his men on their feet and personally led the fire attack as it blasted its way through the enemy ring. As they came to a hairpin curve, enemy fire from a roadblock again pinned the column down. Lieutenant Colonel Faith organized a group of men and directed their attack on the enemy positions on the right flank. He then placed himself at the head of another group of men and in the face of direct enemy fire led an attack on the enemy roadblock, firing his pistol and throwing grenades. When he had reached a position approximately 30 yards from the roadblock he was mortally wounded, but continued to direct the attack until the roadblock was overrun. Throughout the five days of action Lieutenant Colonel Faith gave no thought to his safety and did not spare himself. His presence each time in the position of greatest danger was an inspiration to his men. Also, the damage he personally inflicted firing from his position at the head of his men was of material assistance on several occasions. Lieutenant Colonel Faith's outstanding gallantry and noble self-sacrifice above and beyond the call of duty reflect the highest honor on him and are in keeping with the highest traditions of the U.S. Army.
(This award supersedes the prior award of the Silver Star (First Oak Leaf Cluster) as announced in G.O. No. 32, Headquarters X Corps, dated 23 February 1951, for gallantry in action on 27 November 1950.)

== Awards and Decorations ==

Badge	Combat Infantryman Badge with star denoting 2nd award		
1st row	Medal of Honor		
2nd row	Silver Star	Bronze Star Medal with 2 Oak leaf clusters	Purple Heart with 1 Oak leaf cluster
3rd row	American Defense Service Medal	American Campaign Medal	European-African-Middle Eastern Campaign Medal with Arrowhead Device and 6 Campaign stars
4th row	World War II Victory Medal	Army of Occupation Medal	National Defense Service Medal
5th row	Korean Service Medal with 3 Campaign stars	United Nations Service Medal Korea	Korean War Service Medal Retroactively Awarded, 2003
Badge	Parachutist Badge with 4 Combat Jump Stars		
Unit awards	Presidential Unit Citation		Korean Presidential Unit Citation

Order of the Red Star

== Dates of rank ==
- Enlisted – 25 June 1941
- 2nd Lieutenant – 27 February 1942
- 1st Lieutenant – 15 July 1942
- Captain – 24 February 1943
- Major – 10 May 1944
- Lieutenant Colonel – 16 June 1945

== See also ==
- List of Korean War Medal of Honor recipients
- Task Force Faith
