= Task Force Faith =

Regimental Combat Team 31
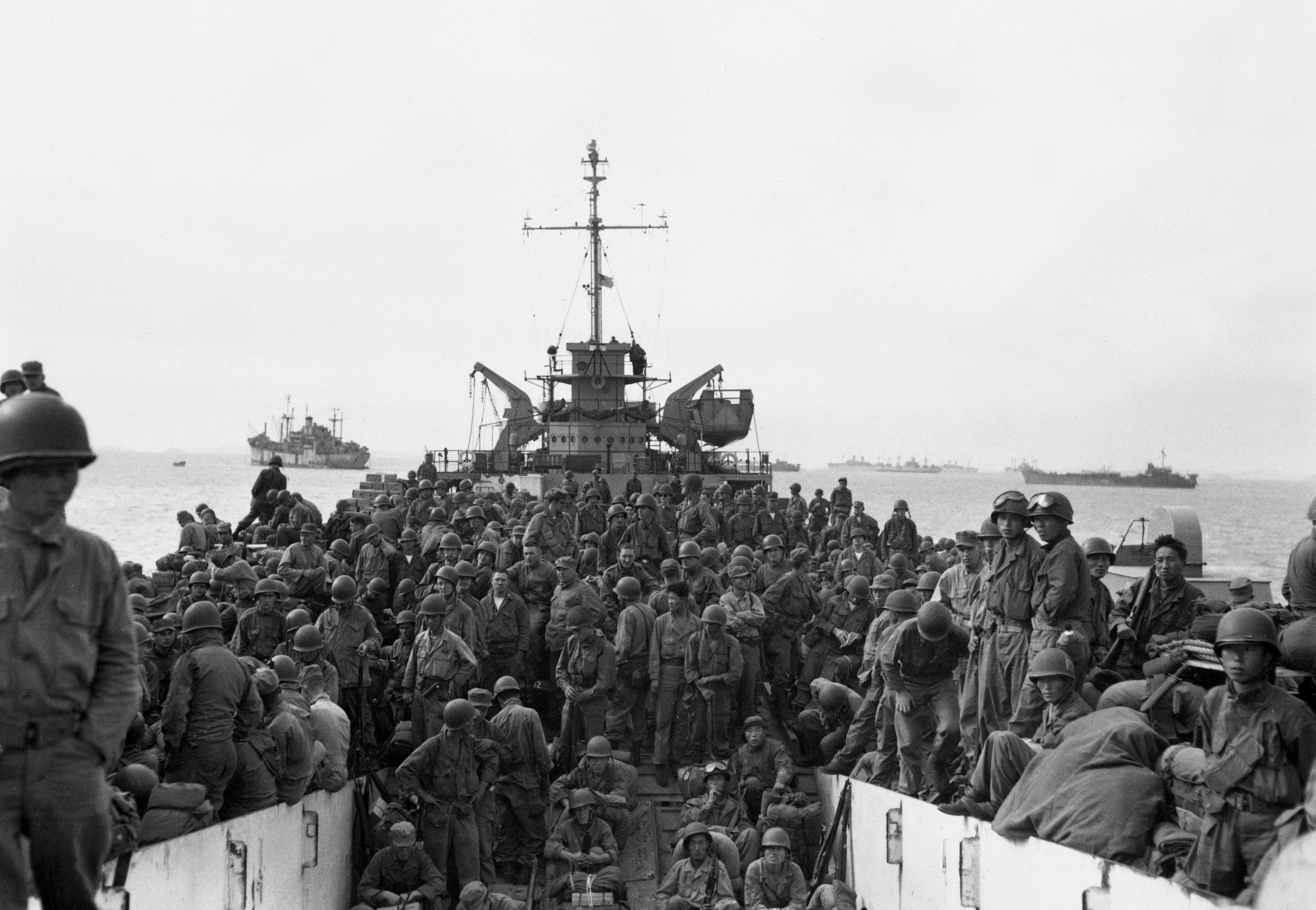
- Active: Aug 1950–Dec 1950
- Country: United States
- Branch: 7th Infantry Division, U.S. Army
- Type: Regimental combat team
- Part of: United Nations Command: X Corps; 7th Infantry Division
- Nickname: "Frozen Chosin"
- Engagements: Korean War / Cold War: Operation Chromite; Capture of Suwon Air Base; Hill 92, Hill 113; Liberation of Pusan; Operation Tailboard; Battle of Chosin; Hungnam Evacuation

Commanders
- Notable commanders: Colonel Richard P. Ovenshine; Colonel Allan D. MacLean; Colonel Don C. Faith; Colonel John A. Gavin

The Regimental Combat Team 31 (RCT-31), commonly referred to as Task Force Faith of the "Chosin Few", is a United States Army unit known for its role in the Battle of Chosin Reservoir during the Korean War where 90-95% of its force was killed, wounded, and/or captured on the eastern side of the reservoir.

RCT-31 primarily consisted of infantry, artillery, and tank units from the 7th Infantry Division including the 31st Infantry Regiment, 57th Field Artillery Battalion, 13th Engineer Combat Battalion, 73rd Heavy Tank Battalion, and the 15th Antiaircraft Automatic Weapons Battalion. It was also augmented by KATUSA (also known as ROKs).

The units of RCT-31 that were positioned at the Chosin Reservoir from 27 Nov–2 Dec 1950 consisted of 3rd Battalion/31st Infantry, 1st Battalion/32nd Infantry Regiment, A and B Batteries/57th Field Artillery Battalion, D Battery/15th Anti-aircraft Automatic Weapons Battalion, and 750 KATUSA soldiers.

"Task Force Faith" is a nickname coined by a U.S. Army historian in the 1960s, and the unit was not known by that name during the Korean War. Historians have subsequently also referred to RCT-31 as "Task Force Ovenshine" and "Task Force MacLean" to distinguish the various periods of command.

== Formation ==
The 31st Regimental Combat Team was established at Camp Crawford, Japan in August 1950 under command of Colonel Richard P. Ovenshine. It initially consisted of the 31st Infantry Regiment, 57th Field Artillery Battalion, and Company C/13th Engineer Combat Battalion.

== United Nations offensive into South Korea ==
On 7 September 1950, RCT-31 was transported to the port of Yokohama via rail, then loaded onto transport ships bound for Incheon, Korea. They were the twenty-first ship in the convoy.

=== Operation Chromite ===
While in transit, RCT-31 was briefed on Operation Chromite. After capturing the beach at Incheon, they were tasked with capturing the Suwon Air Base 22 miles inland. Over the next few days they studied maps, reports, and plans while rehearsing tactics. They landed at Incheon on September 19 via LST and proceeded to Suwon. On September 30, they captured the air base along with Hill 92 and Hill 113, suffering 25 KIA and 75 WIA while inflicting 300 Enemy-KIA, capturing 500 POWs, and destroying 14 tanks and 6 anti-tank guns. Colonel Richard P. Ovenshine was relieved of command following the loss of several officers during the mission. Ovenshine “was awarded the Silver Star for conspicuous gallantry and intrepidity in action against the enemy while serving as Commanding Officer, 31st Infantry Regiment, 7th Infantry Division …”.

=== Liberation of Pusan ===
Throughout October, as United Nations Forces crossed the 38th parallel to capture North Korea, the RCT-31 now commanded by Colonel Allan D. Maclean maneuvered 200 miles south over land toward Pusan (Busan); recapturing towns, liberating prisoners, and killing/capturing the remaining North Korean forces. When they reached Pusan, they were tasked with increasing combat effectiveness (training) with emphasis on physical conditioning, mountain warfare, communications and control, coordination of fire and control, and maintenance of equipment. When not training, they were confined to the USS General M. M. Patrick (AP-150) in Pusan harbor.

== United Nations offensive into North Korea ==
On 25 October 1950, the People's Volunteer Army crossed the Yalu River into North Korea and attacked United Nations Forces at the Battle of Onjong. The 31st Regimental Combat Team was ordered to join the United Nations Forces in the “Home by Christmas Offensive”. They were to land 360 miles north at Riwŏn (Iwon) beach via another amphibious invasion called Operation Tailboard.

=== Operation Tailboard ===
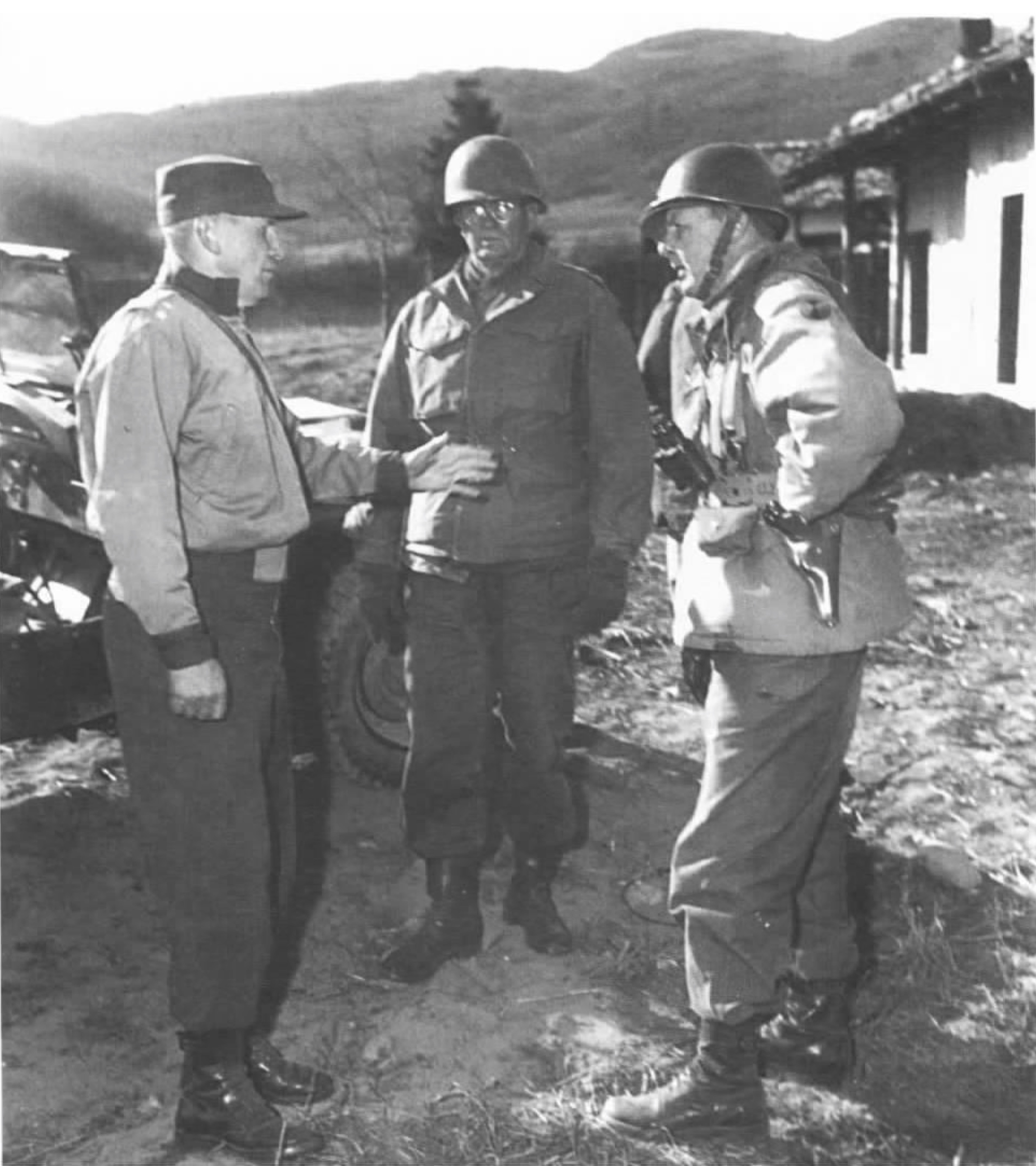
X Corps commander Almond awarded a Silver Star to Col. Allan D. MacLean on Nov. 12, 1950.

RCT-31 landed on Riwŏn (Iwon) beach on 3 November 1950 at 2:00pm. They were tasked with guarding the left flank of the 17th Infantry Regiment in the mountains toward the Pujŏn-ho (Fusen) Reservoir while the 17th captured Kapsan.

=== Fusen Reservoir ===
RCT-31 reached the Pujŏn-ho (Fusen) Reservoir on 15 November 1950 and engaged with ~200 Chinese forces which were repulsed with air strikes via a Marine F4U Corsair. After securing the area, they conducted rotating patrols for the next week while enduring an early winter with temperatures reaching -2 °F. By November 23, 83 soldiers of RCT-31 were treated for frostbite with 33 evacuated. They also conducted a search and rescue operation that successfully located and retrieved a Marine pilot.

=== Chosin Reservoir ===
Battle of Chosin Reservoir
- Part of Korean War and Cold War
Date	27 Nov – 11 Dec 1950
Location	Chosin Reservoir
Result	Chinese victory

Belligerents
United States; South Korea	China

Commanders and leaders
(United States) Allan MacLean † (United States) Don C. Faith, Jr. †	(China) Peng Dehuai

Strength
2,500 U.S. soldiers, consisting of elements of two regiments. 700 KATUSA soldiers.	15,000–20,000, six infantry regiments.

Casualties and losses
1,000 killed (American record); 1,400 killed and wounded, 300 captured (Chinese claim)	2,000–3,000 killed (American estimate); 4,300 killed and wounded (Chinese record)

The 7th Infantry Division was ordered by Major General Ned Almond, X Corps commander, to provide a regiment-sized force to guard the Marines' east (right) flank, by occupying the east side of the reservoir. This force would also attack north to the Yalu River, the boundary between North Korea and China, once the offensive began.

In earlier operations, 7th Division units had become widely spread out and isolated from each other in the rugged, mountainous terrain and primitive road network of the region. This made it impossible to assemble a full-strength task force in time, or to effectively coordinate its operations with the Marines on the south and western sides of the Chosin Reservoir.

Nevertheless, by 27 November RCT-31 had arrived in two separate positions along a 10-mile (16 km) stretch down the east side of the reservoir. Consisting of the 3/31st and 1/32nd infantry battalions, two batteries of the 57th Field Artillery Battalion, and one platoon of Battery D, 15th Antiaircraft Battalion, it was short one infantry battalion and a tank company, both of which were expected to arrive soon. Basic defensive positions were established, but the Americans, not expecting enemy activity, did not set up a tight perimeter with 360 degree security. Colonel MacLean planned to attack north the following morning.

==== Chinese attacks and isolation ====
However, during the night, powerful Chinese forces – which had infiltrated the area undetected – made a surprise attack on the task force elements as well as the Marines, inflicting heavy casualties and forcing the postponement, though not the cancellation, of the planned offensive. The following afternoon General Almond and his aide, 1st Lieutenant Alexander Haig, flew into the perimeter of RCT-31. Despite all the evidence of massive Chinese intervention, Almond exhorted the soldiers to begin the offensive. "The enemy who is delaying you for the moment is nothing more than remnants of Chinese divisions fleeing north" he told the soldiers, "We're still attacking and we're going all the way to the Yalu. Don't let a bunch of Chinese laundry-men stop you." The corps commander then flew back to Hagaru-ri, convinced that RCT-31 was strong enough to begin its attack and deal with whatever "remnants" of CCF forces were in their way. Although large numbers of Chinese troops were seen moving south all day, on the hills east of the task force position, U.S. officers did not change their view of the situation. MacLean still expected reinforcements: his second infantry battalion (2-31) and the 31st Tank Company.

The reinforcements did not arrive. The PLA 80th Division reinforced with the 242nd Regiment from the 81st Division, both from the elite PLA 27th Corps, had – unbeknownst to MacLean – completely surrounded the task force, cutting it off from the south, where they established a strong roadblock a few miles north of the Marine base at the ruined village of Hagaru-ri. When the tank company reached the south end of the reservoir and moved north past Hagaru-ri, it was stopped by the Chinese roadblock, losing four tanks to enemy fire. The next day, it tried again, this time with scratch infantry support from headquarters and service troops of the 31st Infantry and 57th Field Artillery, but it was again beaten back. This force then returned to the position they had occupied at Hudong, a small, abandoned village north of Hagaru-ri, about 4 miles (6.5 km) south of RCT-31.

The Marines – surrounded and under heavy attack – had been unable to give assistance to the Army relief effort. MacLean's expected infantry battalion never made it to the Chosin area at all. MacLean was unaware of this and for some reason he made no effort to establish communications with higher headquarters and report his situation using Capt. Edward Stamford's (the Marine air controller) radio.

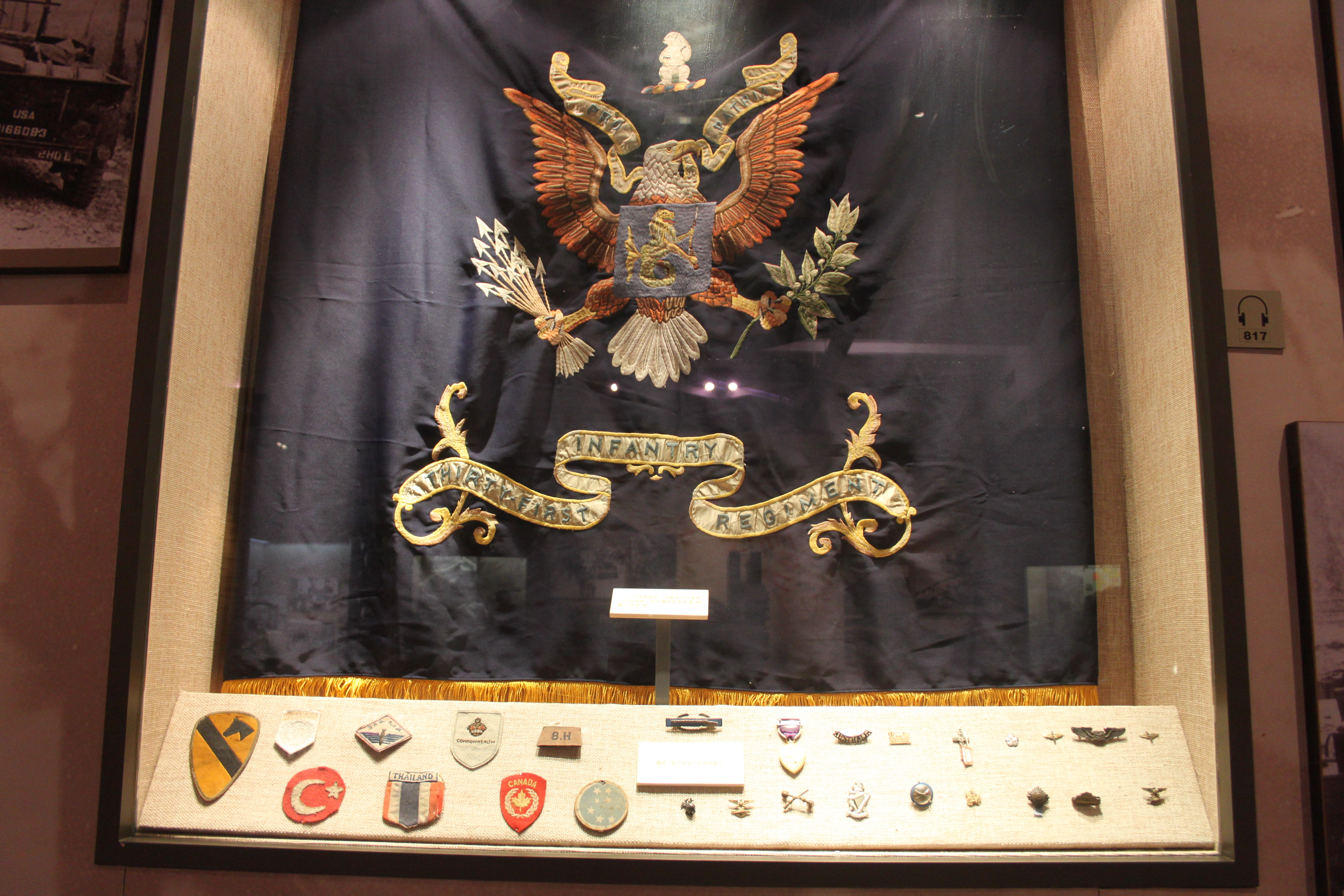
Regimental flag captured by PVA

During the night of 28 November, the Chinese again struck the task force, overrunning several positions, again inflicting many casualties. Chinese prisoners indicated the 80th Division and elements of another, likely the 81st. The Chinese attacked 1/32's position, but were destroyed by artillery and airstrikes. The weather conditions deteriorated rapidly. The temperature plunged as low as -30 degrees F (-34 C), as heavy snow fell, impeding mobility. Visibility was low and the troops were suffering from the intense cold (several men froze to death in their foxholes). Colonel MacLean decided to pull his lead battalion, the 1/32 Infantry, back into the perimeter of his other units a few miles to the south, to provide a stronger defense.

All the rest of the day 1/32 moved under cover of Marine and Navy planes from VMF-212, VMF-214, VMF-312, VMF(N)-513, and Hedron-12. At the same time, the PLA 27th Corps committed the 241st Regiment from the 81st Division. Thousands of enemy troops moving south made excellent targets. In addition to the cover afforded by F4U Corsair fighter-bombers, much-needed supplies were dropped by the Air Force Combat Cargo Command. At times, Captain Stamford found himself directing both air drops from cargo planes and close support strikes over the same radio net. The air was filled with cargo planes, chutes, and agile Corsairs.

Finally, 1/32 joined the casualty-ridden 3/31 after 40 Marine aircraft had hit the enemy with some 225 rockets, 18 napalm tanks, 10 500-lb bombs, and 29 fragmentation bombs. This ordnance was delivered from early morning until the last flight left its station at 1705.

During this withdrawal, MacLean saw what he thought were his long-awaited reinforcements, but as he approached them they turned out to be Chinese, who shot MacLean several times and took him prisoner; he died four days later. Lieutenant Colonel Don Faith, commander of 1/32, now took command. Reaching the southern position, he consolidated the task force into one defensive perimeter as the Chinese intensified their attacks. With the assistance of Marine Corps air support – expertly coordinated by Captain Stamford and without which the task force would have been overwhelmed – RCT 31 fought off heavy assaults by the PLA 80th and 81st divisions for another two days, inflicting severe losses on the communist forces who left hundreds of bodies in the snow around the army position. During the day Stamford directed 38 sorties, making this the major effort of the 1st Marine Air Wing for the day. From 0645 until 1830 Marine planes attacked the Chinese, dropping 21 napalm tanks, 16 500-lb bombs, 21 fragmentation bombs, and firing 190 rockets. All attacks on the perimeter were repulsed.

==== Breakout attempt ====
The Americans were running low on ammunition, and over half their number had been killed or wounded, including a high proportion of key leaders. Faith, realizing he was surrounded and greatly outnumbered, decided to attempt a breakout to the south, toward Marine lines. The situation was so desperate that only a minimum of equipment and sufficient vehicles to carry the wounded were taken, freeing more soldiers to fight as infantry. The rest of the equipment was destroyed in place, including the artillery's howitzers after they fired their last rounds.

The breakout began on 1 December, greatly aided by Marine F4U Corsairs and Navy Grumman F7F Tigercat twin-engine fighters which strafed and bombed Chinese positions as the American truck column, encumbered with hundreds of wounded and under constant attack, made its way down a gravel road on the east side of Chosin Reservoir.

The march south was interrupted when the Corsairs mistakenly bombed short, spraying the lead platoons of the task force with napalm, killing and burning troops. The napalm drop had a demoralizing effect on the task force. As the front of RCT-31 made their way against close-range fire, heavy small arms fire from across the small valley caused many members of the rear guard to seek shelter below the road, instead of protecting the trucks. The enemy fire killed or wounded those already in the trucks as well as the drivers who viewed the job as a form of suicide. In the late afternoon, with light fading, Faith got the column moving again, albeit slowly, until it approached Hill 1221 overlooking the road. One battalion from the PLA 242nd Regiment had set up a strong defensive position on the Hill and a roadblock beneath it to block Faith's retreat. Several units attacked Hill 1221 trying to clear it. As Faith led an assault on the roadblock, he was hit by an enemy grenade and badly wounded.

==== Destruction ====
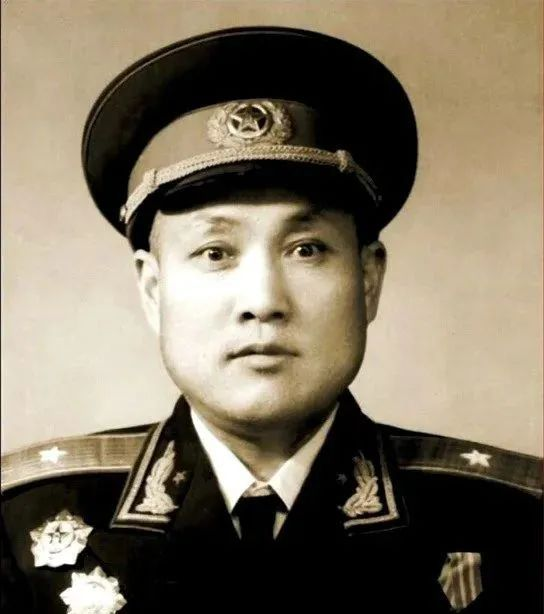
Major General Zhan Danan commanded the PVA 80th and 81st division which led to the destruction of Task Force Faith.

At this point, darkness closed in, ending the protective Marine air cover. Chinese infantry assaults grew bolder, penetrating closer to the convoy. RCT-31 began to disintegrate. Almost all of its officers were dead or seriously wounded. Separate attacks were made on the hill which cleared part of it, but many of the leaderless soldiers, instead of returning to the column, continued out onto the frozen reservoir immediately behind the hill and walked on the ice toward Marine positions several miles to the south, seeking safety.

The roadblock at the base of the hill was finally removed, and the truck column again crept forward in the dark but was finally halted by another Chinese roadblock just north of Hudong. The U.S. troops and tanks occupying Hudong – who might have saved at least part of the task force – had been ordered back to Hagaru-ri the previous day (an action which remains controversial).

Here the Chinese renewed their attack, swarming among the trucks, throwing white phosphorus grenades into vehicles loaded with wounded, setting some of them on fire. Lieutenant-Colonel Faith, hit again by rifle fire, died of his wounds (he was posthumously awarded the Medal of Honor). Major Harvey Storms, the last commander of 3/31 Infantry, was also killed. The breakout attempt collapsed and the remaining American rear-guard soldiers abandoned the truck convoy and attempted to escape individually, many crossing onto the ice of the reservoir.

Chinese officers and soldiers involved in this battle were new to international conflicts. They had been used to allowing their Chinese Nationalist opponents to survive and surrender after the combat on their own volition. In several instances, Chinese soldiers just stood by as American soldiers dropped their weapons and left once the fighting was over. There were also instances in which the Chinese let go of prisoners who had already surrendered. The 27th Corps was later criticized by PLA historians for not making any serious attempts to gather POW's, thus enabling so many members of Task Force Faith to reach safety and fight again.

==== Withdrawal from North Korea ====
The 385 able-bodied survivors of Task Force Faith were formed into a provisional battalion which was attached to the Marines and fought with them in the breakout of the 1st Marine Division during the remainder of the Battle of Chosin Reservoir. This unit was made up of survivors from east of Chosin, as well as units from Hudong-ni and Hagaru-ri; Tank Company, 31st Infantry, which had been at Hudong-ni and withdrawn on 30 November with other Hudong units, was attached to the 5th Marines as rear guard during the breakout on 6–7 December. The so-called Provisional Battalion (known as "31/7" under Lieutenant Colonel Berry K. Anderson) was actually formed into two small battalions of three rifle companies each, 3/31 (Major Carl Witte) with I, K and L, 1/32 (Major Robert Jones) with companies A, B and C.

==== Casualties ====
According to Daniel L. Davis, an analyst and defense expert, of the 2,500 men in Task Force Faith (RCT-31) who began the withdrawal on December 1, fewer than 350 reached Marine positions at Hagaru-ri, south of the Chosin Reservoir, in fighting condition.

Several hundred more were rescued the following day by Marine jeep patrols. Some soldiers taken prisoner by the Chinese were released a few hours later. Over 1,000 soldiers of Task Force Faith were killed or died in Chinese captivity, about a third of the original strength of RCT-31.

RCT-31 was the largest American unit destroyed except for the 8th Cavalry Regiment, previously destroyed to the west, and the 2nd Infantry Division, rendered ineffective due to one third casualties, near Kunu-ri, also to the west. Casualties for the opposing Chinese 80th and 81st Divisions are not known precisely, but are believed to be extremely heavy. Both divisions were not identified again on the battlefield until early April 1951. Chinese record claims 4,300 killed and seriously wounded. This number does not include the many Chinese soldiers who froze to death due to a lack of winter clothing.

The majority of RCT-31 survivors, suffering from wounds and/or frostbite, were evacuated to hospitals in Japan. 7th Division units comprising the task force were soon reconstituted, going back into battle in February 1951.

==== Legacy ====
Chinese documents and research by historians Marine Corps Major Parrot and Roy Appleman provided evidence that the RCT-31 had fought bravely and performed well given the circumstances. In recognition of the efforts of the 31st RCT, in 2000 the Navy awarded the task force the Navy Presidential Unit Citation. The destruction of Task Force Faith is cited as an example of the failures of Army leadership in Korea, particularly Almond, who ignored Faith's warnings that the unit was facing a numerically superior force of Chinese.

== MIA / POW ==
Of the 1,777 American soldiers of RCT-31 positioned at Chosin Reservoir from 27 Nov–2 Dec 1950, 1,392 were missing in action, either unrecovered killed or prisoners of war, by December 12.

Soldier	Date Identified	Date Recovered	Initiative	Unit	Ref.
Don C. Faith Jr.	11 Oct 2012	2004	36th Joint Recovery Operation	Commanding Officer, Regimental Combat Team 31	
Corporal Jules Hauterman, Jr.	14 Dec 2016	15 Sep 1954	Operation Glory	Medical Platoon, 1st Battalion, 32nd Infantry Regiment	
Corporal Melvin R. Hill	12 Oct 2016	1990–1994	North Korean repatriation	Heavy Mortar Company, 32nd Infantry Regiment	
Corporal Freddie L. Henson	3 Apt 2017	2004	36th Joint Recovery Operation	Battery A, 57th Field Artillery Battalion	
Sergeant First Class Rufus L. Ketchum	24 Apr 2018	Sep 2001	Joint Recovery Operation	Medical Detachment, 57th Field Artillery Battalion	
Master Sergeant Carl H. Lindquist	8 Aug 2018	1954	Operation Glory	Headquarters Company, 3rd Battalion, 31st Infantry Regiment	
Sergeant Arnold Pitman	7 Oct 2014	1954	Operation Glory	Company L, 3rd Battalion, 31st Infantry Regiment	
Sergeant James W. Sharp	9 Jan 2017	2001	25th Joint Recovery Operation	Battery B, 57th Field Artillery Battalion	
Sergeant Joseph M. Snock	5 Jan 2015	1993	North Korean repatriation	Heavy Mortar Company, 31st Infantry Regiment	
Major Harvey H. Storms	30 Jul 2019	27 Jul 2018	2018 NK–US Summit	Executive Officer, Headquarters, 3rd Battalion, 31st Infantry Rgt	
Sergeant First Class Nicholas J. Valentine	16 Mar 2021	27 Jul 2018	2018 NK–US Summit	Battery B, 57th Field Artillery Battalion, 7th Infantry Division	
Corporal Asa E. Vance	10 Sep 2019	27 Jul 2018	2018 NK–US Summit	Company D, 32nd Infantry Regiment, 7th Infantry Division	

== Honors ==
Lieutenant Colonel Don C. Faith, Jr. was posthumously awarded the Medal of Honor.

The following soldiers were awarded the Distinguished Service Cross, for actions East of the Reservoir:

- Colonel Allan D. MacLean, Commander RCT-31, posthumously awarded
- Captain George R. Cody, HMC 31 Inf., posthumously awarded
- Corporal James H. Godfrey, D/32 Inf.
- Sergeant Harold B. Haugland, D/15 AAA Bn. Haugland is listed as missing in action.
- Sergeant Charles Garrigus, 1/32 Inf., posthumously awarded.
- Major Robert E. Jones, S-3 of 1/32 Inf.
- Lieutenant John E. Gray, M/31 Inf.
- Captain Earle Jordan, M/31 Inf.
- Lieutenant Robert G. Schmitt, M/31 Inf.
- Sergeant Stanford O. Corner, Med/A/57 FAB.

== Media ==
- Task Force Faith (2014), documentary directed by Julie Precious
