= 32nd Infantry Regiment (United States) =

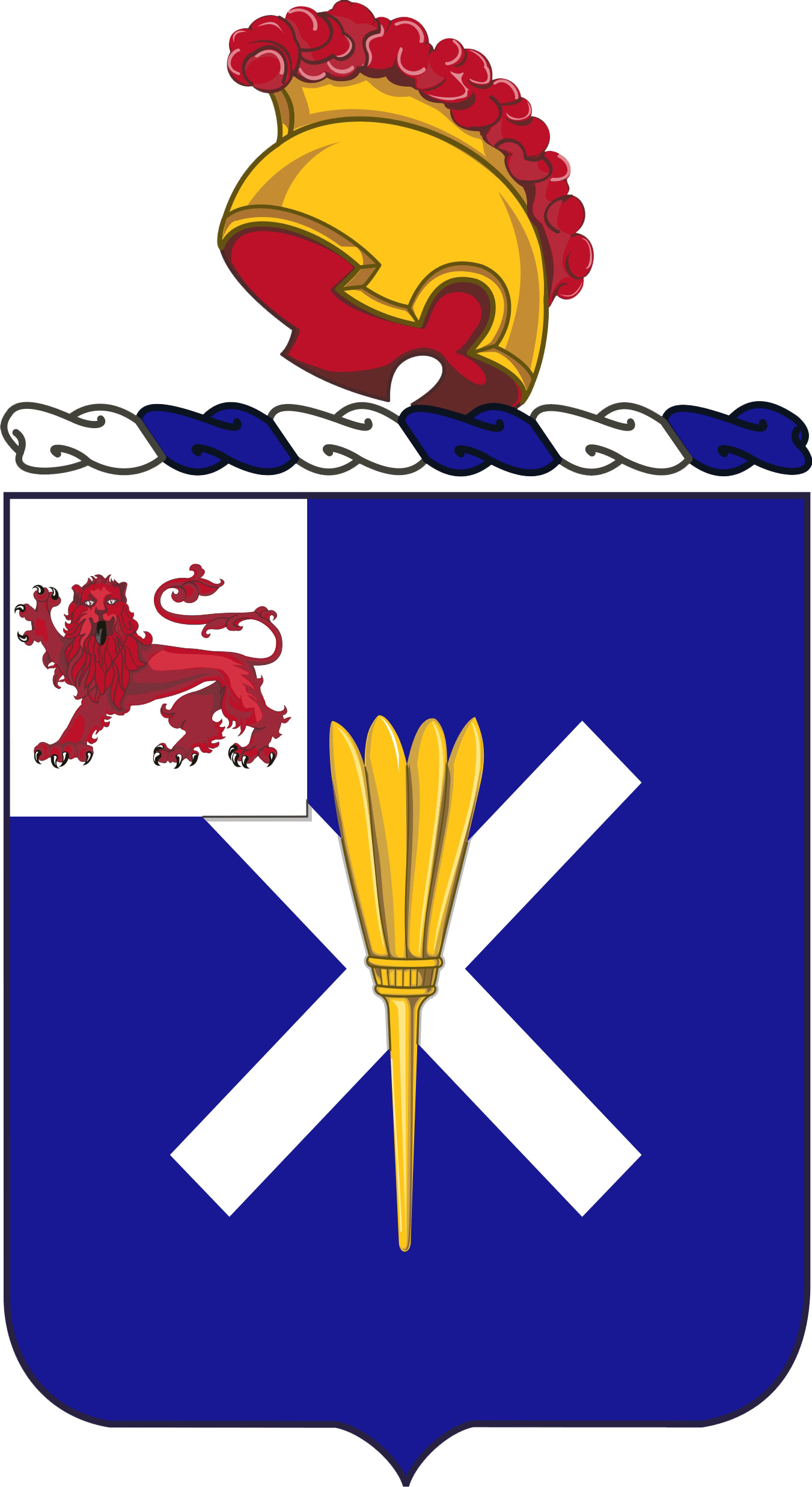
- Coat of arms
- Active: 1916 – present
- Country: United States
- Branch: United States Army
- Type: Light infantry
- Garrison/HQ: 1st Battalion – Fort Drum, New York
- Nicknames: "Chosin" "Buccaneers" "Spearhead"
- Mottos: "Against All Odds" "The Queen's Own"
- Engagements: World War II; *Attu Island; *Kwajalein; *Leyte Island; *Okinawa; Korean War; *Battle of Incheon; *Battle of Chosin Reservoir; *Battle of Triangle Hill; Gulf War; Operation Uphold Democracy; Multinational Force and Observers; Operation Joint Guardian; Global War on Terror; *Operation Iraqi Freedom; *Operation Enduring Freedom; *Operation Freedom's Sentinel; *Operation Inherent Resolve

Commanders
- Current commander: LTC Ross Daly
- Notable commanders: William S. Carpenter; Colin Powell; Michael Oates; Don C. Faith; Christopher Cavoli; Frederick “Mark” O'Donnell; Kenneth J. Mintz; Charles M. Mount Jr. Charles E. Beauchamp

Insignia
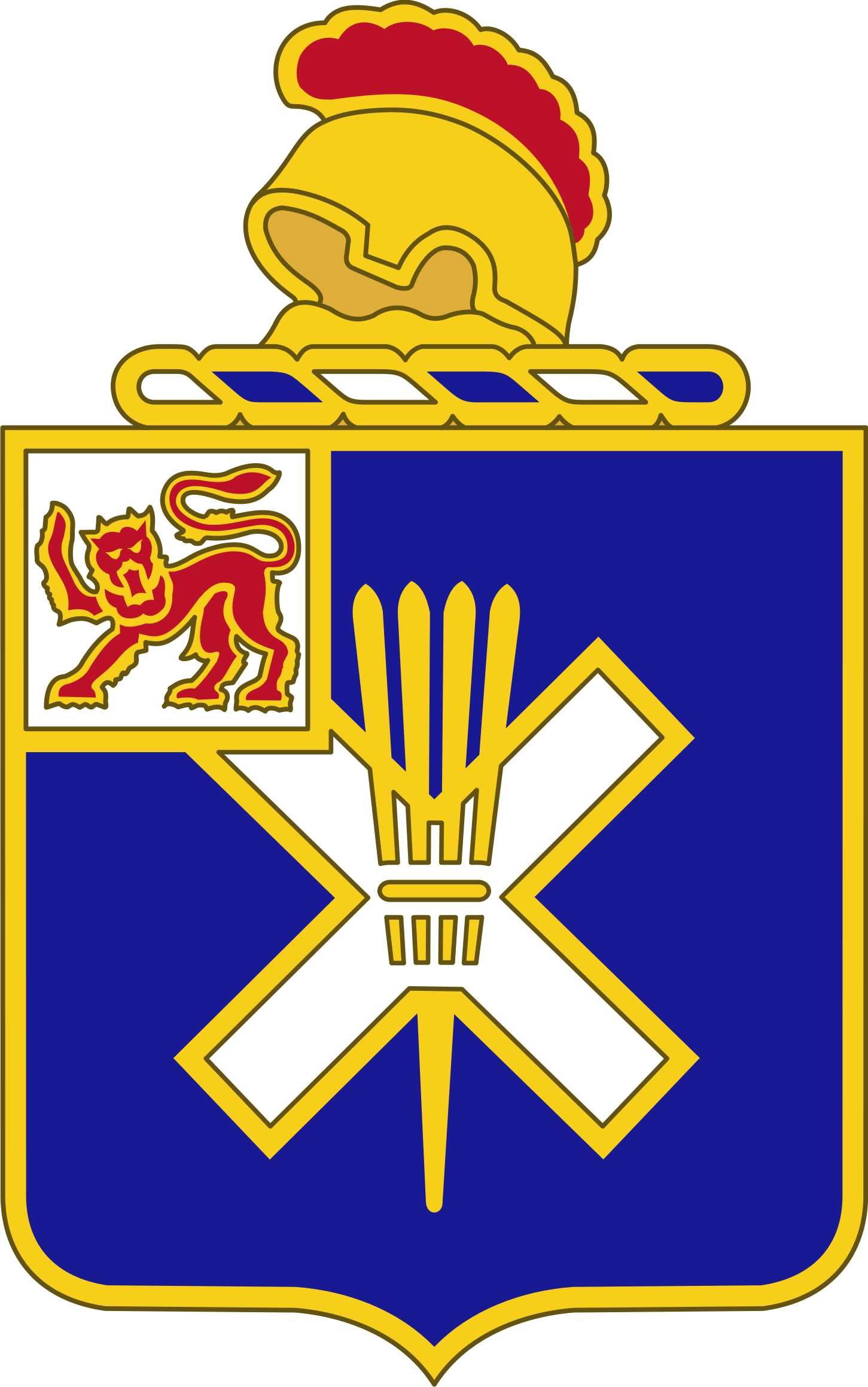
- Distinctive unit insignia

The 32nd Infantry Regiment is a battalion within the United States Army. Of the original regiment, only the 1st Battalion remains as an active duty unit. The 1st Battalion, 32nd Infantry Regiment is a light infantry battalion assigned to the 1st Brigade Combat Team, 10th Mountain Division, garrisoned at Fort Drum, New York. The battalion was previously assigned to the 3rd Brigade Combat Team at Fort Drum, before this unit was reflagged to Fort Johnson, formerly Fort Polk, Louisiana.

== History ==
The 32nd Regiment was first organized on 7 August 1916, on Oahu, Hawaii from elements of the 1st and 2nd Infantry Regiments. At its activation, it was known as "The Queen's Own" Regiment, a title bestowed by the last queen of Hawaii, Liliuokalani.

=== World War I ===
During World War I, units of the 32nd Regiment were used to escort German prisoners of war being transferred to the United States from Hawaii. On 20 July 1918, the 32nd was transferred to Camp Kearny, San Diego, California, where it became a part of the 32nd Infantry Brigade, 16th Infantry Division. A short time later, many of the Regiment's men were transferred to the 82nd Infantry Regiment and remained with this organization until it was demobilized in 1919.

=== Interwar period ===
After the demobilization of the 16th Division, the 32nd Infantry became a separate regiment and was transferred on 8 September 1920 to the Presidio of San Francisco, California. Concurrently, the 1st and 3rd Battalions were transferred to Vancouver Barracks, Washington. The regimental headquarters was inactivated on 1 November 1921 at the Presidio of San Francisco; the 38th Infantry Regiment was previously designated as "Active Associate" on 27 July 1921, and would provide the cadre from which the 32nd Infantry would be reactivated in time of war. Those personnel at the Presidio were concurrently transferred to the 19th Infantry Regiment, and those at Vancouver Barracks were transferred to the 59th Infantry Regiment. The 38th Infantry was relieved as the Active Associate on 17 July 1922 and the 14th Infantry Regiment was designated as Active Associate.

The regiment was concurrently allotted to the Panama Canal Department and assigned to the Panama Canal Division, but being inactive, it never deployed to Panama as a unit. it was organized as a "Regular Army Inactive" unit with Organized Reserve personnel about June 1926 at Los Angeles, California. It was withdrawn from allotment to the Panama Canal Department on 27 June 1927, relieved from the Panama Canal Division, and allotted to the Ninth Corps Area. It was affiliated with the University of California at Los Angeles ROTC program 8 February 1928 and organized with Regular Army personnel assigned to the ROTC Detachment and Reserve officers commissioned from the program. Many unit personnel participated in earthquake relief operations 14–22 March 1933 in the Los Angeles area. The regiment conducted summer training at Del Monte, California, and the Presidio of Monterey. The 2nd Battalion was activated on 18 October 1939 with personnel and equipment of the 2nd Battalion, 7th Infantry Regiment, at Chilkoot Barracks, Territory of Alaska, which was concurrently transferred to Camp Bonneville, Idaho. The 2nd Battalion was transferred on 22 June 1940, less personnel and equipment, to Camp Ord, California, and the remainder of the regiment was assigned to the 7th Infantry Division and activated 1 July 1940, less Reserve personnel, at Camp Ord.

=== World War II ===
After the Japanese attack on Pearl Harbor, the 32nd was moved into defensive positions along the West Coast. The regiment underwent intensive training as a motorized unit at Camp San Luis Obispo, California. Vast maneuvers were held in the Mojave Desert to prepare the 32nd for participation in the defeat of the German Afrika Korps, led by Field Marshal Erwin Rommel. A change in Allied strategy, however, turned the 32nd overnight toward a role of amphibious assaults from the Aleutian Islands to tropical jungle islands.

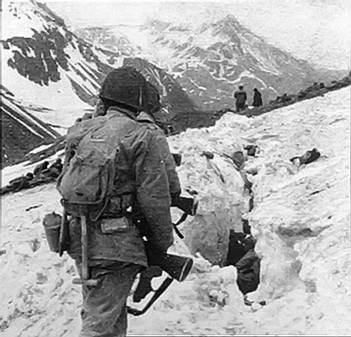
American troops endure snow and ice during the battle of Attu in May 1943.

Rushed to the Aleutians in the spring of 1943, after the Japanese had landed on Attu Island a year earlier, the regiment played a major role in retaking American soil during the Battle of Attu. It was on the Aleutian Islands that Private Joe P. Martinez, Company I, earned the Medal of Honor. Seeing his unit pinned down by enemy machine gun fire, Private Martinez single-handedly charged the enemy emplacement and destroyed it. While rallying the men he was mortally wounded. Private Martinez received the Medal of Honor posthumously.

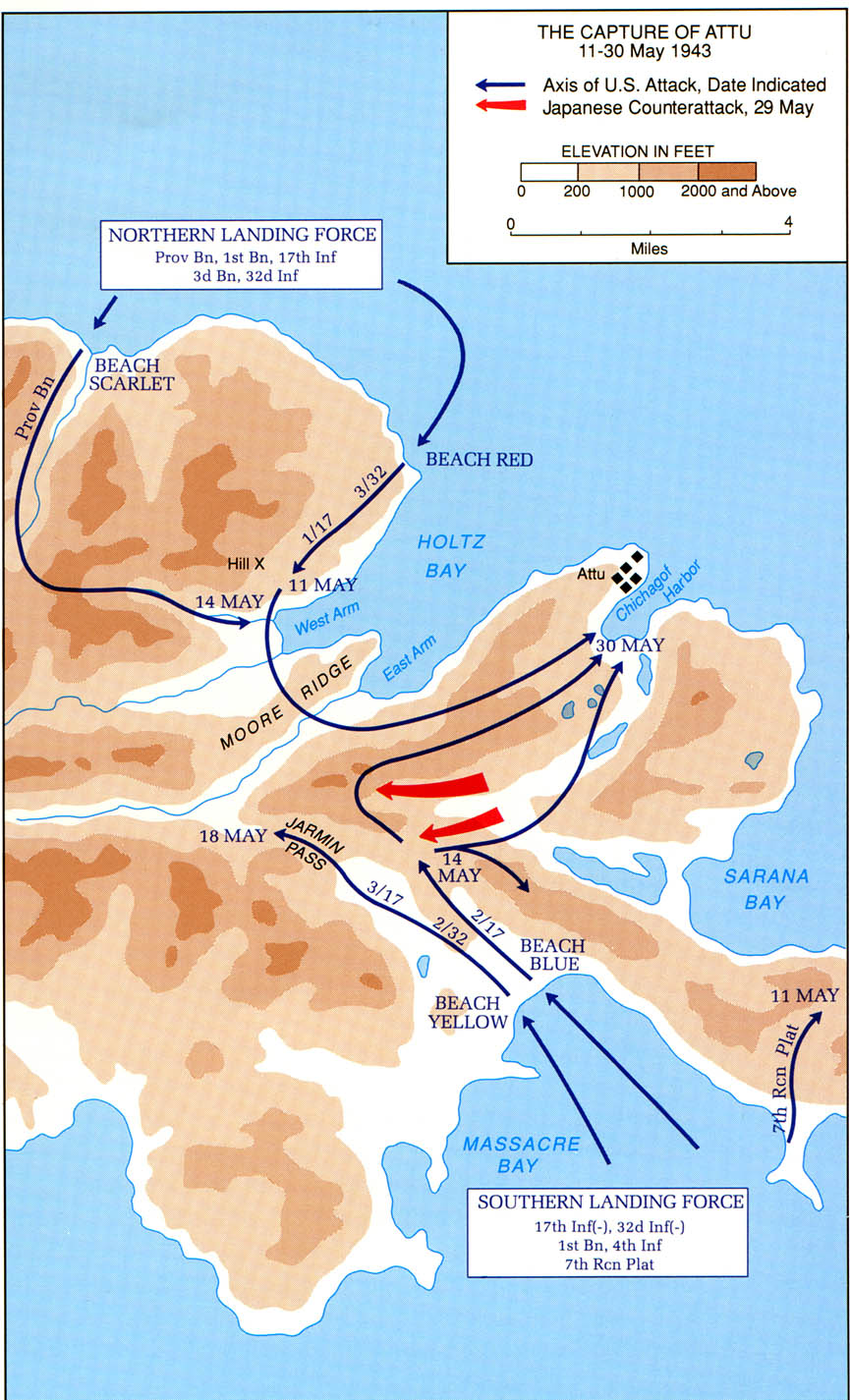
Map showing the recapture of Attu in 1943

After their baptism of fire in the Aleutians Campaign, the 32nd Regiment sailed to Hawaii for intensive training that emphasized amphibious landings and jungle fighting.

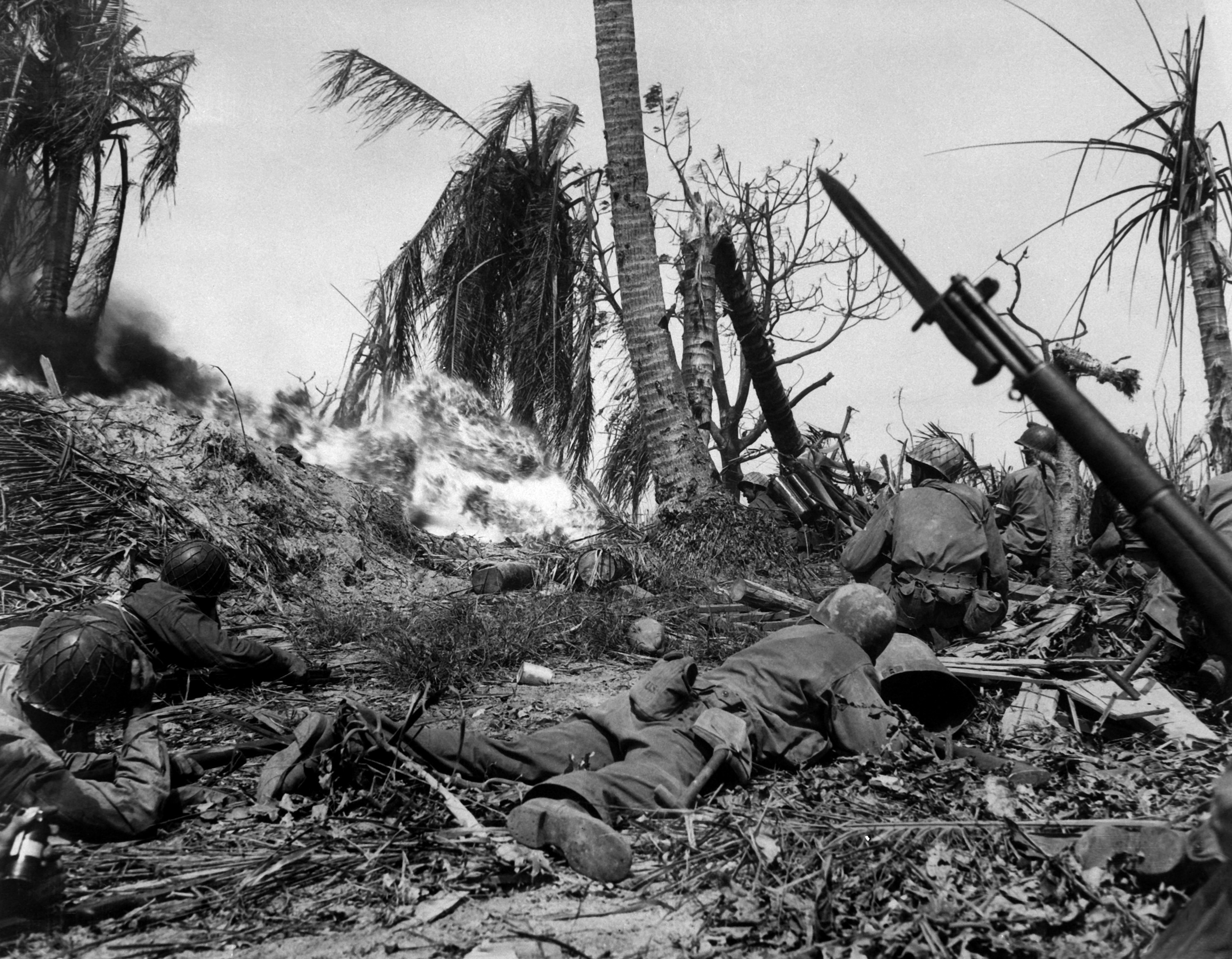
Soldiers of the 7th Infantry Division attack a Japanese blockhouse on Kwajalein.

On 1 February 1944, the 32nd Regiment assaulted Kwajalein. During five days of fighting, the 32nd, along with the 184th Infantry Regiment, eliminated all the enemy personnel on the island, with the exception of a few exhausted Japanese who surrendered.

The regiment returned to Hawaii on 14 February where it went through additional intensified jungle training for an expected invasion of the Yap Island. Arriving at Eniwetok Atoll on 25 September 1944, the regiment's orders were changed and the 32nd joined General Douglas MacArthur's forces, spearheading the first landings on Leyte Island, Philippines. Fighting in swamps, tropical jungles, and over rugged mountains, the 7th Infantry Division battled over 37 miles (60 kilometers) in 60 days of bitter combat.

The regiment's last campaign of World War II started 1 April 1945 with the landings at Okinawa. During this battle, the 32nd won the nickname "Spearhead" because of its continuous attacks against the enemy.

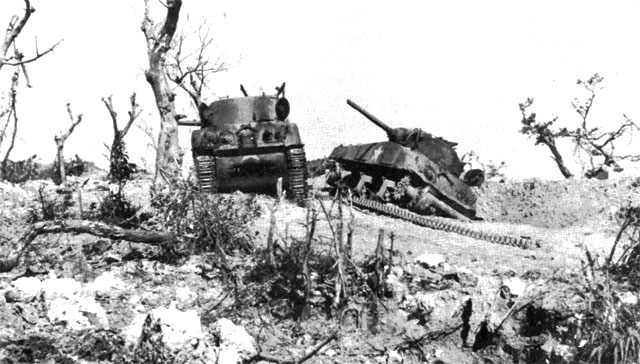
Two US M4 Sherman tanks knocked out by Japanese artillery at Bloody Ridge, April 20, 1945

After only three days of rest after the fighting on Okinawa, the 32nd embarked for Korea to receive the surrender of all the Japanese troops south of the 38th parallel. During its campaigns through the Pacific, the 32nd Infantry Regiment traveled 16,910 miles.

During the regiment's occupation stay in Korea, infantrymen obtained a preview of their future tour in the Korean War. Units of the 32nd rotated on outpost positions along the 38th Parallel. The troops formed a tight perimeter against southbound guerrilla bands and were assigned the mission of eliminating the wholesale movement of black-market goods across the boundary.

In December 1948, the 7th Infantry Division loaded on ships and sailed to Japan where its zone of occupation responsibility included almost half of the total land area of Japan. The 32nd replaced the 11th Airborne Division. During its stay in Japan, the strength of the regiment dropped by almost half of its authorized strength.

=== Korean War ===
On 25 June 1950, the North Korean Army crossed the 38th Parallel, initiating the Korean War, taking Seoul and pushing all the way to the Pusan Perimeter. The 32nd began immediate preparation for deployment from Japan.

Intensive training for a proposed amphibious landing in Korea focused the training for the regiment. A major problem facing the 32nd at this time was the integration of several hundred ROK soldiers who were to fight alongside American troops. Demonstrations, sign language, and a smattering of Japanese were used during the intensive military training. The ROK soldiers were integrated at the squad level and introduced to the American "buddy team" system in combat. American soldiers were responsible for the training and integration of the assigned ROK troops. After six days of loading supplies and equipment, the 32nd boarded troopships, departing for Inchon, Korea.

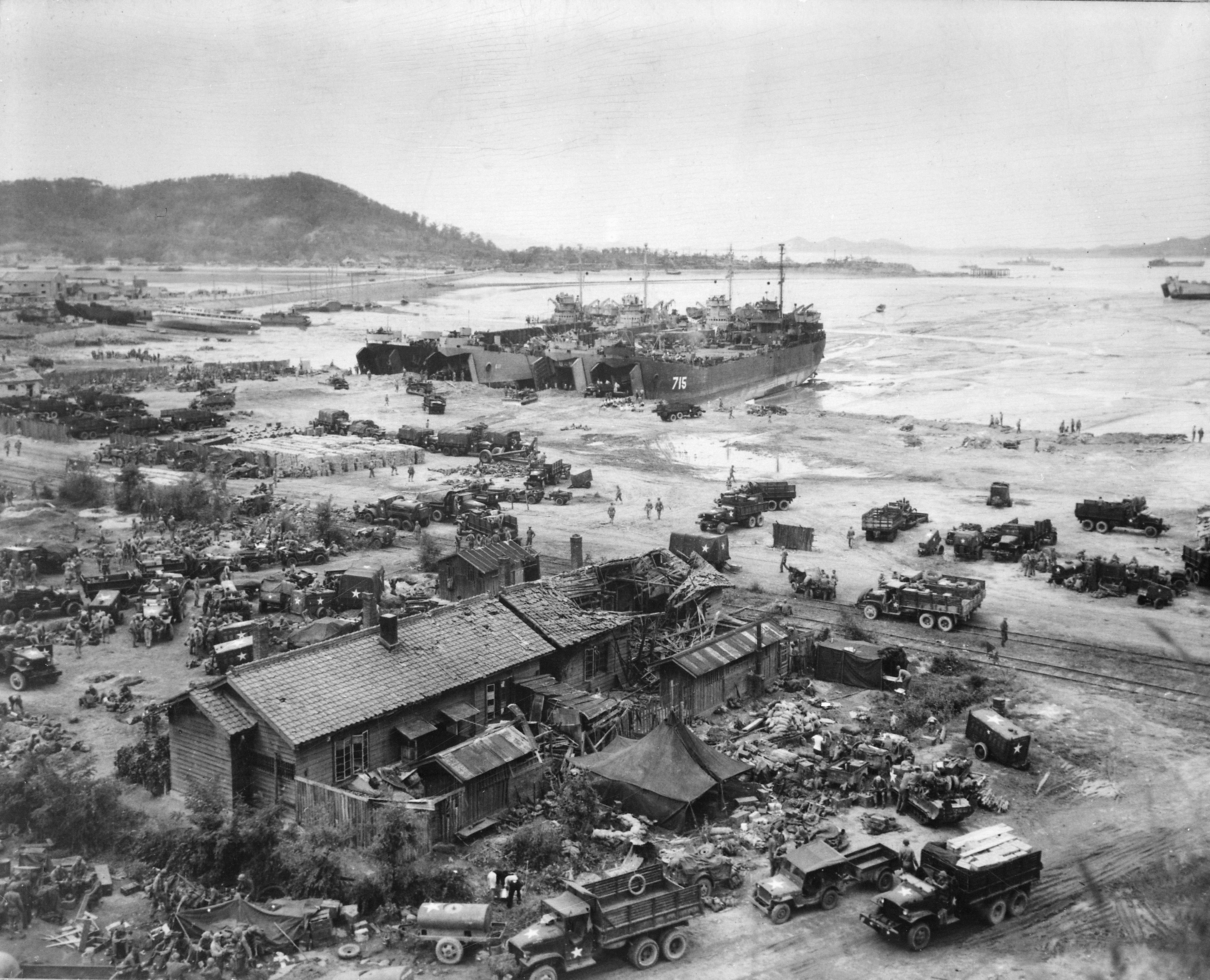
The Inchon Landings

The 32nd went ashore on 16 September 1950, and were immediately met by small arms, mortar, and tank fire from communist forces. The 32nd advanced north toward the Han River, the last natural barrier to Seoul. The "Buccaneers" of the 32nd, in the cold morning hours of 25 September, crossed the Han River under intense enemy fire and captured their first objective, a dominating hill mass outside Seoul, at 1030. Its capture provided the 32nd with sufficient momentum to gain all assigned objectives. With the capture of the surrounding heights overlooking and dominating the city, US Marine elements were able to resume their advance. The regiment was awarded the Navy Unit Commendation for their actions in relieving pressure on the Marines.

The division was relieved of the responsibility for the Seoul area on 30 September 1950 and moved 350 miles overland, arriving in Pusan to begin training for another proposed landing, this time at Wonson, North Korea. Departing from Pusan Harbor on 28 October, the mission of the 7th Infantry Division was changed to land at Riwŏn and advance to the Korean-Manchurian border.

Landing at Riwŏn on the 29th, the regiment moved quickly northward with the 1st Battalion on the east coast of the Chosin Reservoir and the 2nd and 3rd in the Fusan Reservoir area.

At that point there were definite indications of Communist Chinese intervention in the war. Information that three enemy divisions had arrived at Yudam-ni on 20 November reached intelligence personnel via prisoners of war. On the ground, no contact was made in the Chosin Reservoir area.

On 29 November 1950, when the full force of the Chinese attack struck the UN forces, the 2nd and 3rd Battalions stood their ground until UN elements further north moved to join the battle. Together all these UN elements made an orderly withdrawal from the Fusan area.

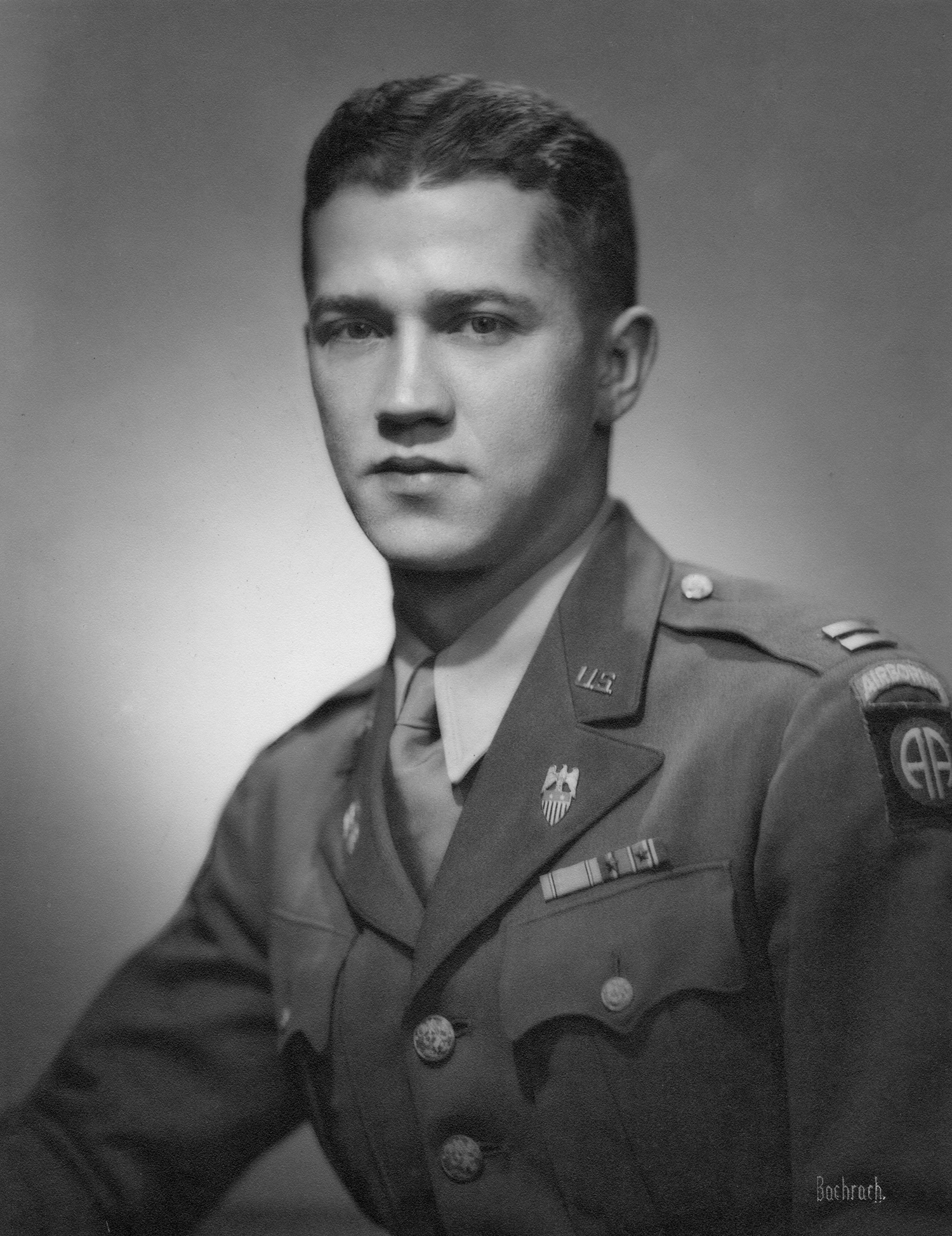
Lieutenant Colonel Don Carlos Faith Jr. RCT-31 was later known as "Task Force Faith" due to his leadership.

The 1st Battalion on the east coast of the Battle of Chosin Reservoir was with elements of the 31st Infantry Regiment and the 1st Marines, who were cut off by Chinese forces. Only after long and bloody fighting did these forces work their way south to Koto-ri, and then to the Hungman perimeter. Lieutenant Colonel Don C. Faith Jr., 1st Battalion, 32nd Infantry, commander of Task Force Faith, distinguished himself in this action. During the five-day period from 27 November to 1 December 1950, he personally directed his troops across the ice-covered reservoir and continually placed himself with the forward elements of the battalion. He was mortally wounded while attempting to destroy an enemy road block with hand grenades. For his leadership, Lieutenant Colonel Faith was posthumously awarded the Medal of Honor, the nation's highest award for valor.

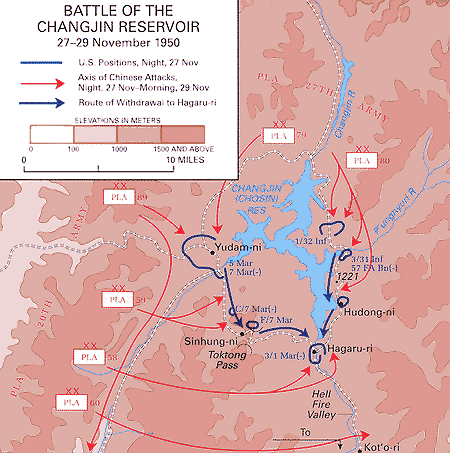
Map of the Battle of the Changjin (Chosin) Reservoir.

Elements of the regiment were among the units that participated in the Battle of Triangle Hill from October to November 1952.

With the signing of the Korean Armistice Agreement and the end of the Korean war, the regiment busied themselves with defensive preparations on the Korean peninsula, in case of a resumption of hostilities. The regiment was later reorganized and activated as the 1st Battalion, 32nd Infantry Regiment.

=== Cold War ===
On 28 May 1978, the 1st Battalion, 32nd Infantry Regiment was stood down as part of President Carter's effort to withdraw from Korea. Just prior to that, Colin Powell, William S. Carpenter and Steven Silvasy served as battalion commanders.

The 1st Battalion, 32nd Infantry was later reactivated on 7 Aug 1980 at Fort Ord, California, where it joined the 2nd and 3rd Battalions of the 32nd Infantry to form the 2nd Brigade, 7th Infantry Division. This effort was part of a plan on the part of officers in the brigade, particularly the commander, Colonel Don Chunn, to support the re-establishment of a strong regimental system in the US Army. This effort supported the wider Army's "cohort" effort to rebuild cohesive units after the struggles with unit morale and effectiveness in the late stages of the Vietnam War and the early developments of the "All-Volunteer Army." The effort focused on the training of recent Basic Combat Training (BCT) graduates in a company organization assigned to 1st Battalion, 32d Infantry, as they would be in a normal organization. The 1st Battalion, 32d Infantry became the first CONUS based infantry battalion to deploy to the Republic of Korea during TEAM SPIRIT 80 since the Korean War. This deployment, which included a full Divisional support element totally 850 men was named Task Force Faith in honor of LTC Faith. When the Army restructured its regimental designations later in the 1980s, the three battalions of the 32nd Infantry were re-designated.

=== Gulf War ===
In the late 1980s and early 1990s the 3rd Battalion, 32nd Infantry served as a basic training battalion at Fort Benning, Georgia, and had the distinction of one of the first training units to conduct M2 Bradley Fighting Vehicle specific training. On 2 August 1990 Saddam Hussein's armies invaded Kuwait. Many recruits found themselves graduating that October, only to find themselves in the deserts of Saudi Arabia for Operations Desert Shield and Desert Storm as early as late November-early December of the same year.

On 15 February 1996, 1st Battalion, 32nd was activated as the only active battalion of the 32nd Regiment, as part of the 10th Mountain Division, Fort Drum, New York. Following reactivation, the battalion participated in numerous training exercises and a six-month rotation as a highly visible component of the Multinational Force and Observers (MFO) peacekeeping mission in the Middle East.

In May 2002 the battalion returned from a six-month rotation in Kosovo as part of Task Force Falcon. The deployment was part of Operation Joint Guardian.

=== Global war on terrorism ===
In August 2003, the battalion deployed to central Iraq as part of 1st Brigade, 10th Mountain Division in support of Operation Iraqi Freedom. What had originally been planned as a six-month deployment ended as a thirteen-month combat tour. During the deployment, Alpha Company was based at FOB Volturno near Fallujah while Bravo and Charlie Companies conducted combat operations and built FOB Chosin (later renamed FOB Iskandariyah) at the Musayyib Power Plant in conjunction with engineers from the 82nd Airborne Division. Later Bravo and Charlie Companies would move to FOB Manhattan, located between Ramadi and Fallujah.

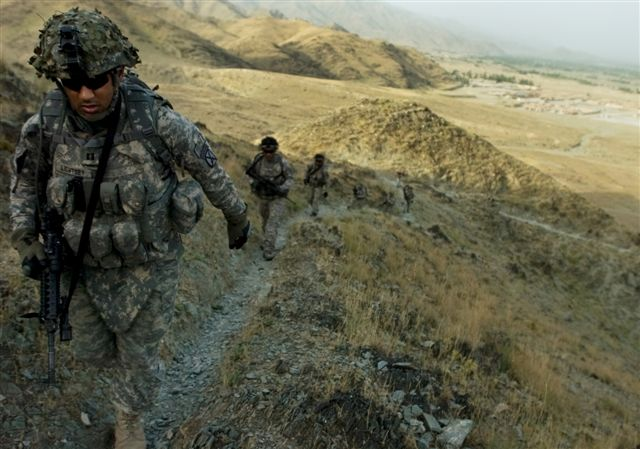
Soldiers with 1st Battalion, 32nd Infantry Regiment on patrol in Kunar Province, Afghanistan.

In February 2006 the battalion deployed to eastern Afghanistan as "Taskforce Chosin" in support of Operation Enduring Freedom for what became a fifteen-month combat tour when 3rd Brigade Combat Team, 10th Mountain Division was extended after twelve months in country. Initially, the battalion assumed responsibility for Nangarhar, Laghman, Kunar, and portions of Nuristan Provinces. Alpha Company operated in the Korengal Valley, Bravo Company operated around Nangalam and in Nuristan Province, specifically Bella and Aranas. Charlie Company operated along the Peche River, while Delta Company detached individual platoons to Alpha and Charlie Companies and received the attachment of 3rd Platoon, Bravo Company. Delta Company was detached to 4th Battalion, 25th Field Artillery Regiment at FOB Salerno as the only maneuver force in Khost Province. Further, the battalion was augmented by Alpha Company, 27th Engineer Battalion (Combat)(Airborne). The first platoon of the engineer company conducted route clearance in the battalion's area of operations, while the Light Equipment platoon conducted construction and combat operations in the Korengal Valley, Pech River Valley, and Waygal Valley—including serving as battlespace owners in the village of Wanat.

In late February 2007 the battalion was notified that 3rd Brigade Combat Team, 10th Mountain Division would remain in country until June 2007 to allow time to deploy additional combat troops. Taskforce Chosin's AO was redrawn to include only Kunar and parts of Nuristan Provinces as the remainder of the brigade repositioned from the southern portion of Regional Command East. As part of this move, Delta Company returned to battalion control, receiving its 2nd Platoon, a section of mortars, and a forward logistics element (FLE). Delta Company then established Fire Base Fortress along the Abad-Jbad Road between the Chowkay and Narang Valleys, and began operations into both valleys. In June 2007, the trail elements of the battalion finally returned home to Fort Drum, New York.

In April 2008 a corporal who had been killed at the Chosin Reservoir was identified.

In 2009, the 1st Battalion, 32nd Infantry Regiment deployed to Kunar Province, Afghanistan in support of Operation Enduring Freedom under the command of Regional Command East of the International Security Assistance Force. The battalion was detached from 3rd Brigade Combat Team, 10th Mountain Division to support the 1st Infantry Division and later Task Force Mountain Warrior of the 4th Brigade Combat Team, 4th Infantry Division. The battalion conducted mounted and dismounted operations in Kunar Province and responded to enemy movement and activity in nearby Nuristan Province. However, the Battalion was not whole. Bravo Company was assigned to deploy with 3rd Squadron, 71st Cavalry Regiment, and was detached and separate from the rest of the battalion for the deployment. Bravo Company operated in Logar Province. The battalion redeployed to the United States in the winter of 2010, returning to Fort Drum and their higher headquarters. During this deployment, the battalion received the Valorous Unit Award—the Army's second highest unit decoration—for actions during the Battle of Barge-Matal.

In March 2011, the 1st Battalion, 32nd Infantry again deployed as part of 3rd Brigade Combat Team, 10th Mountain Division, this time to Kandahar Province, southern Afghanistan, in support of Operation Enduring Freedom XI-XII under the command of Lieutenant Colonel (later Colonel) Kenneth J. Mintz. The battalion was a battle space owner in the western portion of the Zhari District, replacing the 2nd Battalion, 502nd Infantry Regiment of the 101st Airborne Division. The battalion's area of operations included the villages of Nalgham and Sangsar, the spiritual heartland of the Taliban and the hometown of the Taliban's founder, Mullah Omar. Throughout the deployment, the battalion was headquartered at Forward Operations Base (FOB) Howz-e-Madad located on the north side of Highway 1, with Attack Company at Combat Outpost (COP) Ahmed Khan, Battle Company at COP Sangsar, Combat Company at COP Nalgham, and Dawg/Dog Company at COP Zarif Khel. Soldiers from the battalion conducted a series of successful "Steel Lion" operations, fighting south to the Arghandab River to isolate the Taliban insurgents from the population, secure the area through the construction of numerous strongpoints manned by US and Afghan security forces, and bring relative stability to the area. Additionally, Soldiers from the battalion worked shoulder to shoulder with the Afghan National Army, Afghan National Police, Afghan National Civil Order Police, and stood up several new elements of Afghan Local Police, before redeploying to Fort Drum in March 2012. During this deployment the battalion suffered fourteen Soldiers killed-in-action (KIA), half of the brigade's total KIA casualties.

The battalion again deployed to Afghanistan as part of 3rd Brigade, 10th Mountain Division in support of Operation Enduring Freedom in the fall of 2013.

After the deactivation of 3rd Brigade, 10th Mountain Division and its reflagging at Fort Polk, Louisiana in 2014, the 1st Battalion, 32nd Infantry Regiment was again reassigned back to 1st Brigade, 10th Mountain Division.

In 2020, under the command of Lieutenant Colonel Scott Horrigan, the battalion deployed to Afghanistan in support of Operation Freedom's Sentinel.

In 2022, under the command of Lieutenant Colonel Nicholas Bilotta, the battalion deployed to Syria in support of Operation Inherent Resolve. The TF's AO encompassed the Eastern Syria Security Area. During this deployment tree Soldiers earned purple hearts, however the battalion returned whole with no KIA.

In 2024-2025, under the command of Lieutenant Colonel Ross Daly, the battalion deployed to Syria again in support of Operation Inherent Resolve. The Battalion was in Syria during the Fall of the Assad regime

== Lineage ==
1st BATTALION, 32d INFANTRY REGIMENT

Constituted 1 July 1916 in the Regular Army as Company A, 32d Infantry

Organized 7 August 1916 at Schofield Barracks, Hawaii (32d Infantry assigned 31 July 1918 to the 16th Division; relieved 8 March 1919 from assignment to the 16th Division)

Inactivated 13 September 1921 at Vancouver Barracks, Washington

Activated 1 July 1940 at Camp Ord, California, as an element of the 7th Division (later redesignated as the 7th Infantry Division)

Reorganized and redesignated 1 July 1957 as Headquarters and Headquarters Company, 1st Battle Group, 32d Infantry, and remained assigned to the 7th Infantry Division (organic elements concurrently constituted and activated)

Reorganized and redesignated 1 July 1963 as the 1st Battalion, 32d Infantry

Relieved 31 March 1971 from assignment to the 7th Infantry Division and assigned to the 2d Infantry Division

Inactivated 21 October 1978 in Korea and relieved from assignment to the 2d Infantry Division

Assigned 7 August 1980 to the 7th Infantry Division and activated at Fort Ord, California

Inactivated 10 June 1987 at Fort Ord, California, and relieved from assignment to the 7th Infantry Division

Assigned 16 February 1996 to the 10th Mountain Division and activated at Fort Drum, New York

Relieved 16 September 2004 from assignment to the 10th Mountain Division and assigned to the 3d Brigade Combat Team, 10th Mountain Division

Redesignated 1 October 2005 as the 1st Battalion, 32d Infantry Regiment

== Campaign participation credit ==
World War II: Aleutian Islands (with arrowhead); Eastern Mandates; Leyte (with arrowhead); Ryukyus (with arrowhead)

Korean War: UN Defensive; UN Offensive; CCF Intervention; First UN Counteroffensive; CCF Spring Offensive; UN Summer-Fall Offensive; Second Korean Winter; Korea, Summer-Fall 1952; Third Korean Winter; Korea, Summer 1953

War on Terrorism (1st battalion only): Consolidation 1; Consolidation 2; Consolidation 3

== Decorations ==
- Meritorious Unit Citation (Army) for AFGHANISTAN 2013–2014
- Valorous Unit Award (Army) for NURISTAN PROVINCE 2009
- Meritorious Unit Citation (Army) for AFGHANISTAN 2006–2007
- Meritorious Unit Citation (Army) for IRAQ 2003–2004
- Valorous Unit Award (Army) for IRAQ 2003–2004
- Presidential Unit Citation (Army) for CENTRAL KOREA
- Presidential Unit Citation (Army) for KUMHWA
- Presidential Unit Citation (Navy) for INCHON
- Presidential Unit Citation (Navy) for CHOSIN RESERVOIR
- Presidential Unit Citation (Navy) for HWACHON RESERVOIR
- Navy Unit Commendation for PANMUNJOM
- Philippine Presidential Unit Citation for 17 October 1944 TO 4 July 1945
- Republic of Korea Presidential Unit Citation for INCHON
- Republic of Korea Presidential Unit Citation for KOREA 1950–1953
- Republic of Korea Presidential Unit Citation for KOREA 1945–1948; 1953–1971

Company B Only

- Meritorious Unit Citation (Army) for AFGHANISTAN DEC 2008-DEC 2009

== See also ==
- Transformation of the United States Army
