= Robert Ingram =

Robert Ingram may refer to:

- Robert Acklom Ingram (1763–1809), English mathematician, clergyman and political economist
- Robert R. Ingram (born 1945), United States Navy sailor and recipient of the Medal of Honor
  - USS Robert R. Ingram, an Arleigh Burke-class destroyer of the United States Navy
- Robert Ingram (MP), MP for Nottingham in 1318 and 1327 and for Derbyshire in 1340
