= List of people from Waterville, Maine =

The following list includes notable people who were born or have lived in Waterville, Maine.

== Authors and academics ==
- David Brancaccio, radio and television journalist; born in Waterville
- Ron Currie Jr., author
- Eric Hooglund, political scientist; born in Waterville
- Richard Hooker, surgeon and author
- Marston Morse, mathematician; born in Waterville

== Business and philanthropy ==
- Sharon H. Abrams, executive director, Maine Children's Home for Little Wanderers
- Gardner Colby, philanthropist, namesake of Colby College
- George Gilman, founder of the Great Atlantic and Pacific Tea Company
- Charles Foster Hathaway, founder of C.F. Hathaway Company shirt company

== Military ==
- David B. Champagne, corporal, recipient of the Medal of Honor during the Korean War
- Donald L. Harlow, second chief master sergeant of the Air Force
- Charles Heywood, ninth commandant of the Marine Corps
- Charles L. Phillips, U.S. Army brigadier general

== Politics ==
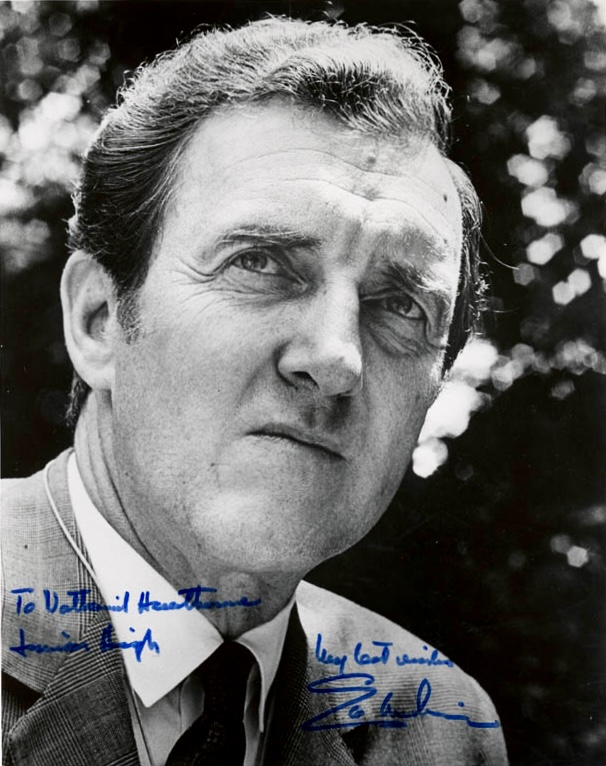
Edmund Muskie practiced law in Waterville prior to the launching of his long political career.

- Walter A. Burleigh, U.S. congressman
- Clinton Clauson, mayor and 66th governor of Maine
- Samuel S. Conner, U.S. congressman
- Pam Iorio, 57th mayor of Tampa
- Charles Fletcher Johnson, U.S. senator and judge
- Sydney M. Heath, state representative
- David Lemoine, state treasurer of Maine
- Paul LePage, mayor of Waterville, 74th governor of Maine
- Nelson Madore, professor and mayor of Waterville (1999–2004)
- Robert Maheu, American businessman and lawyer, who worked for the FBI and CIA, and as the chief executive of Nevada operations for the industrialist Howard Hughes.
- George J. Mitchell, U.S. senator
- Wyman B. S. Moor, U.S. senator
- Edmund Muskie, U.S. senator; 64th governor of Maine, secretary of state, 1968 vice presidential candidate
- Jane Muskie, First Lady of Maine
- Charles P. Nelson, U.S. congressman
- Bruce Poliquin, U.S. congressman, state treasurer of Maine
- Samuel Shapiro, Maine state treasurer (1981–1996)
- Bruce A. White, state representative

== Religion ==
- Donald Edmond Pelotte, Roman Catholic bishop

== Sports ==
- Dan Bolduc, hockey forward with the Detroit Red Wings, U.S. team in the 1976 Winter Olympics, and at Harvard University
- John Huard, football linebacker for Denver Broncos, New Orleans Saints, Montreal Alouettes and Toronto Argonauts
- Jeff Libby, hockey defenseman with the New York Islanders

== Entertainment ==
- Lew Cody, stage and screen actor
- David E. Kelley, television and film producer, born in Waterville
- Kurt Marshall, model and actor, born in Waterville
- Vaughn Meader, comedian, born in Waterville
- Judy Pancoast, singer and songwriter
