= Frank N. Mitchell =

United States Marine Corps Medal of Honor recipient (1921–1950)

Frank Nicias Mitchell
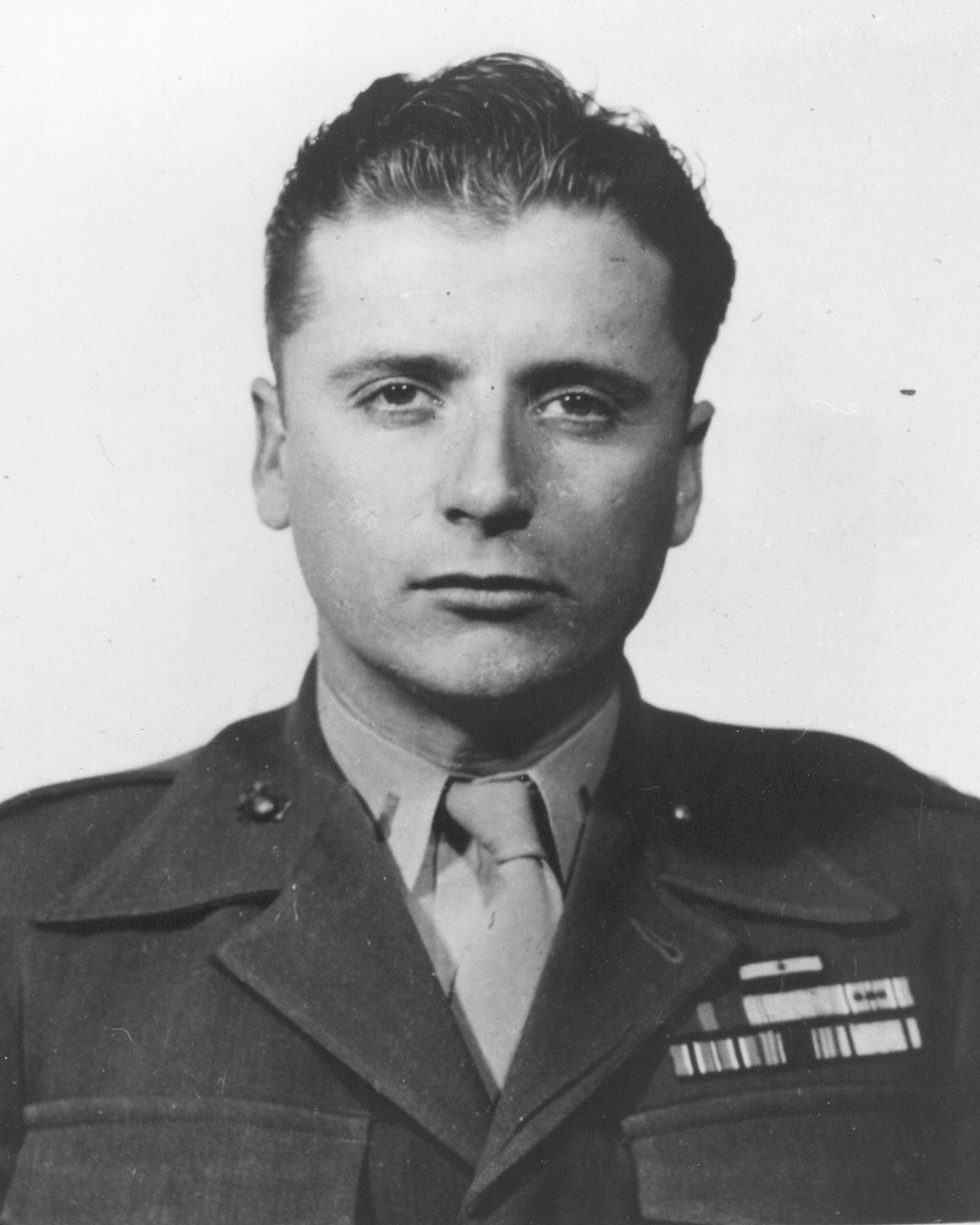
- Mitchell in c. 1950
- Born: August 18, 1921; Indian Gap, Texas, United States
- Died: November 26, 1950 (aged 29); Hagsang-ni, North Korea
- Burial place: memorialized in the Courts of the Missing, National Memorial Cemetery of the Pacific, Honolulu, Hawaii
- Military career
- Allegiance: United States
- Branch: United States Marine Corps
- Service years: 1939–1950
- Rank: First Lieutenant
- Units: Company A, 1st Battalion, 7th Marines, 1st Marine Division
- Conflicts: World War II; Korean War: Second Battle of Seoul
- Awards: Medal of Honor; Silver Star; Bronze Star Medal w/ Combat "V"; Purple Heart (2)

Frank Nicias Mitchell (August 18, 1921 – November 26, 1950) was a United States Marine who served in World War II and was killed in action while serving with the 1st Marine Division in the Korean War. He posthumously received the United States' highest military decoration for valor, the Medal of Honor, for his actions as a platoon commander during a firefight with the enemy on November 26, 1950, at Hagsang-ni, near Yudamni in North Korea.

== Early life ==
Frank Mitchell was born on August 18, 1921, in Indian Gap, Texas, to J.D. and Isabel Mitchell. He was a 1938 graduate of Roaring Springs High School in Roaring Springs, Texas. He attended Colorado College under the Navy V-12 program, Southwestern University, University of North Texas, and North Texas Agricultural and Mechanical College, where he played football. He married Beverly Banks and they had one daughter.

== Military career ==
Mitchell enlisted in the United States Marine Corps in 1939. During World War II he served aboard the aircraft carrier USS Enterprise at Wake Island, additional service in the Marshall Islands, and occupation duty in China. He was also attached to Fleet Marine Force Pacific as a member of its rifle and pistol team. He was commissioned a second lieutenant in 1945.

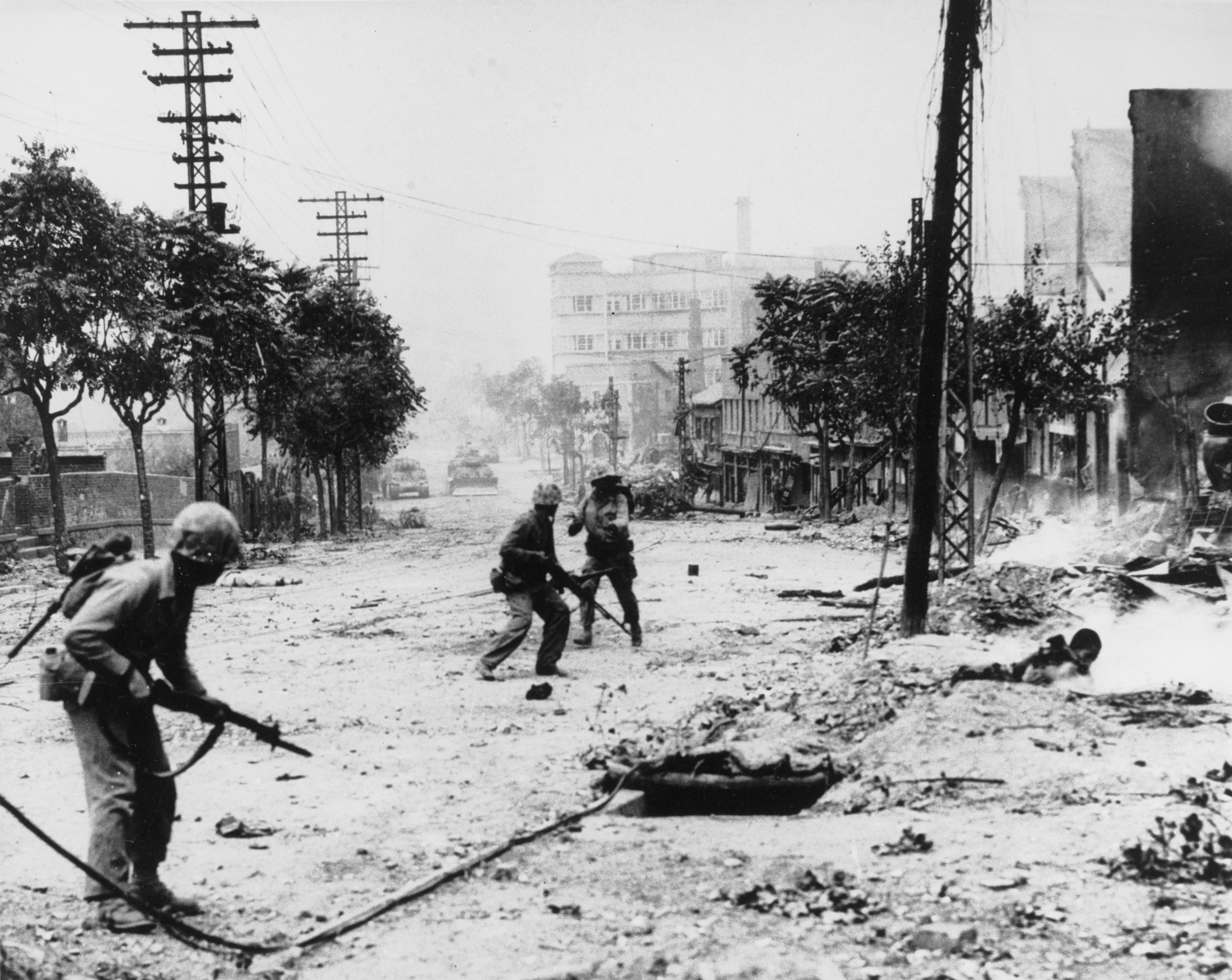
U.S. Marines fighting during the liberation of Seoul, the capital of South Korea, in September 1950

During the Korean War, First Lieutenant Mitchell was a rifle company platoon commander in Company A, 1st Battalion, 7th Marine Regiment, 1st Marine Division; the 7th Marines were activated on August 17, 1950, at Camp Pendleton. The 7th Marines and Mitchell, left Camp Pendleton and sailed for Japan on September 1. On September 21, the 7th Marines made an amphibious landing at Inchon, South Korea. His regiment including the 1st Battalion, rejoined the 1st Marine Division which had made an assault landing at Inchon on September 15, and participated with the division in the battle of Seoul against North Korean forces. On September 26, Mitchell personally led his platoon up a well defended hill and overtook the enemy. He was awarded the Bronze Star Medal with Combat "V" "for heroic achievement in connections with operations against the enemy while serving with Company A... during the period 24 September 1950 to 4 October 1950". The 7th Marines landed ashore next at Wonsan on October 27.

Afterwards, the 1st Marine Division headed by the 7th Marines were directed to march into North Korea to Hamhung, their objective, the Chosin Reservoir, a man-made lake. The 7th Marines were to proceed north of Hamhung to relieve a South Korean Army unit which had fought with Chinese Communist forces (two hundred thousand Chinese troops had entered North Korea on October 19 by secretly crossing the Yalu River, and launched an offensive on October 25). On November 2, the 7th Marines reached the South Koreans with little opposition (November 1 was the first confrontation between the Chinese and the U.S. military). However, Chinese presence increased after this. On November 3, as Company A was in a defensive position near Hamhung, Mitchell's platoon was hit hard suddenly by the Chinese and almost overrun. Mitchell "rallied his men to repel the attack and he, although painfully wounded in the ensuing action, refused to be evacuated until the danger of a serious break-through was averted." He was awarded the Silver Star (posthumous). On November 4, one of Mitchell's platoon's squad leaders, Sergeant James Poynter, during a bayonet attack against the Chinese, took out three enemy machine guns with grenades, thereby saving his squad and platoon during a hill fight (Hill 532) at Sudong, and was posthumously awarded the Medal of Honor. On November 15, the 7th Marines and the 1st Marine Division completed their move north to Hagaru-ri, at the southern tip of the reservoir. The division was to proceed more north to Yudamni, on the western side of the Chosin Reservoir and to seize it, which was done with little resistance on November 25.

As Mitchell and A Company was on patrol south of Yudam-ni the next day, Mitchell's platoon which was on point, got hit hard by a Chinese ambush near the small village of Hagsang-ni which caused a fierce firefight with the Chinese and many casualties on his platoon. Lt. Mitchell immediately took action at the front of his platoon and shown "great personal valor and extraordinary heroism". Despite being wounded, he personally sacrificed his own life to save the lives of the Marines which were wounded in his platoon, and the other outnumbered Marines in his platoon when they were being withdrawn. For his leadership and heroic actions during the enemy's attack and counterattack on his platoon that included hand-to-hand fighting, he was awarded the Medal of Honor (posthumous). He was listed as missing in action and his remains were not recovered. The Battle of Chosin Reservoir would begin on the night of November 27, when both the 7th Marines and 5th Marines were counter-attacked by a massive number of Chinese troops which would soon force the surrounded 1st Marine Division at Yudam-ni to begin their withdrawal from North Korea.

The Medal of Honor was posthumously presented to Mitchell's widow and daughter on his behalf by Lieutenant Colonel Henry D. Strunk, the acting director of the 6th Marine Corps Reserve District, at his widow's home in Atlanta, Georgia, on August 6, 1952.

"Mitchell Hall" at The Basic School in Camp Barret, Marine Corps Base Quantico, Virginia, is named for him.

== Citations ==
=== Medal of Honor citation ===
The President of the United States in the name of The Congress takes pride in presenting the MEDAL OF HONOR posthumously to FIRST LIEUTENANT FRANK N. MITCHELL
UNITED STATES MARINE CORPS for service as set forth in the following

CITATION:

For conspicuous gallantry and intrepidity at the risk of his life above and beyond the call of duty as Leader of a Rifle Platoon of Company A, First Battalion, Seventh Marines, First Marine Division (Reinforced), in action against enemy aggressor forces in Korea on 26 November 1950. Leading his platoon in point position during a patrol by his company through a thickly wooded and snow-covered area in the vicinity of Hasan-ni [Hagsang-ni], First Lieutenant MITCHELL acted immediately when the enemy suddenly opened fire at point-blank range, pinning down his forward elements and inflicting numerous casualties in his ranks. Boldly dashing to the front under blistering fire from automatic weapons and small arms, he seized an automatic rifle from one of the wounded men and effectively trained it against the attackers and, when his ammunition was expended, picked up and hurled grenades with deadly accuracy, at the same time directing and encouraging his men in driving the outnumbering enemy from his position. Maneuvering to set up a defense when the enemy furiously counterattacked to the front and left flank, First Lieutenant MITCHELL, despite wounds sustained early in the action, reorganized his platoon under devastating fire and spearheaded a fierce hand-to-hand struggle to repulse the onslaught. Asking for volunteers to assist in searching for and evacuating the wounded, he personally led a party of litter bearers through the hostile lines in growing darkness and, although suffering intense pain from multiple wounds stormed ahead and waged a singlehanded battle against the enemy, successfully covering the withdrawal of his men before he was fatally struck down by a burst of small-arms fire. Stouthearted and indomitable in the face of tremendous odds. First Lieutenant MITCHELL by his fortitude, great personal valor and extraordinary heroism, saved the lives of several Marines and inflicted heavy casualties among the aggressors. His unyielding courage throughout reflects the highest credit upon himself and the United States Naval Service. He gallantly gave his life for his country.

/S/ HARRY S. TRUMAN

=== Silver Star citation (Army) ===
The President of the United States of America, authorized by Act of Congress July 9, 1918, takes pride in presenting the Silver Star (Army Award) (Posthumously) to First Lieutenant Frank Nicias Mitchell (MCSN: 0-48132), United States Marine Corps, for gallantry in action while serving with Company A, First Battalion, Seventh Marines, FIRST Marine Division (Reinforced), in action against the enemy near Hamhung, North Korea, on 3 November 1950, as a Rifle Platoon Leader occupying a position in his company's defensive sector. While making a short reconnaissance to improve his position, his platoon was suddenly and viciously attacked by the enemy. Immediately returning to his platoon, which was on the verge of being overrun, he rallied his men to repel the attack and he, although painfully wounded in the ensuing action, refused to be evacuated until the danger of a serious break-through was averted. First Lieutenant Mitchell's actions were in keeping with the highest traditions of the United States Naval Service.

=== Bronze Star Medal citation ===
The President of the United States of America takes pleasure in presenting the Bronze Star Medal to First Lieutenant Frank Nicias Mitchell (MCSN: 0-48132), United States Marine Corps, for heroic achievement in connection with operations against the enemy while serving with Company A, First Battalion, Seventh Marines, FIRST Marine Division (Reinforced), during the period 24 September 1950 to 4 October 1950. First Lieutenant Mitchell, acting as a Rifle Platoon Commander, continuously displayed outstanding leadership and professional skill against the enemy. On 26 September 1950, while assigned the mission of assaulting a well defended hill, he fearlessly led the men up the hill. As the enemy fire increased, his platoon became pinned down and forced to take cover. Heedless of his own personal safety, he repeatedly exposed himself to the enemy fire and moved among his men to inspire and rally them to continue the assault. His actions materially aided his platoon in successfully seizing and occupying the objective. First Lieutenant Mitchell's courageous actions were in keeping with the highest traditions of the United States Naval Service.

First Lieutenant Mitchell is authorized to wear the Combat "V".

== Awards and Decorations ==
Mitchell's military decorations and awards include the following:

1st row	Medal of Honor		Silver Star
2nd row	Bronze Star Medal with "V" Device	Purple Heart with 2 5/16 inch stars	Combat Action Ribbon with 5/16 inch star
3rd row	Navy Presidential Unit Citation with 2 Service stars	Marine Corps Good Conduct Medal	China Service Medal
4th row	American Defense Service Medal with 'Fleet' clasp	American Campaign Medal	Asiatic-Pacific-Campaign Medal with 3 Campaign stars
5th row	World War II Victory Medal	National Defense Service Medal	Korean Service Medal with 2 Campaign stars
6th row	Korean Presidential Unit Citation	United Nations Service Medal Korea	Korean War Service Medal Retroactively Awarded, 2003

== Legacy ==
The following have been named in honor of 1st Lt. Mitchell:

- Roaring Springs, Texas has renamed the highway bypass surrounding the town, and built a town park in his honor.
- The Marine Archives building in Washington D.C. is named in his honor.
- "Mitchell Hall", The Basic School, Camp Barret, Quantico, Virginia.

== See also ==
- List of Korean War Medal of Honor recipients
