= John D. Kelly (Korean War soldier) =

Marine Corps Medal of Honor recipient (1928–1952)

John Doran Kelly
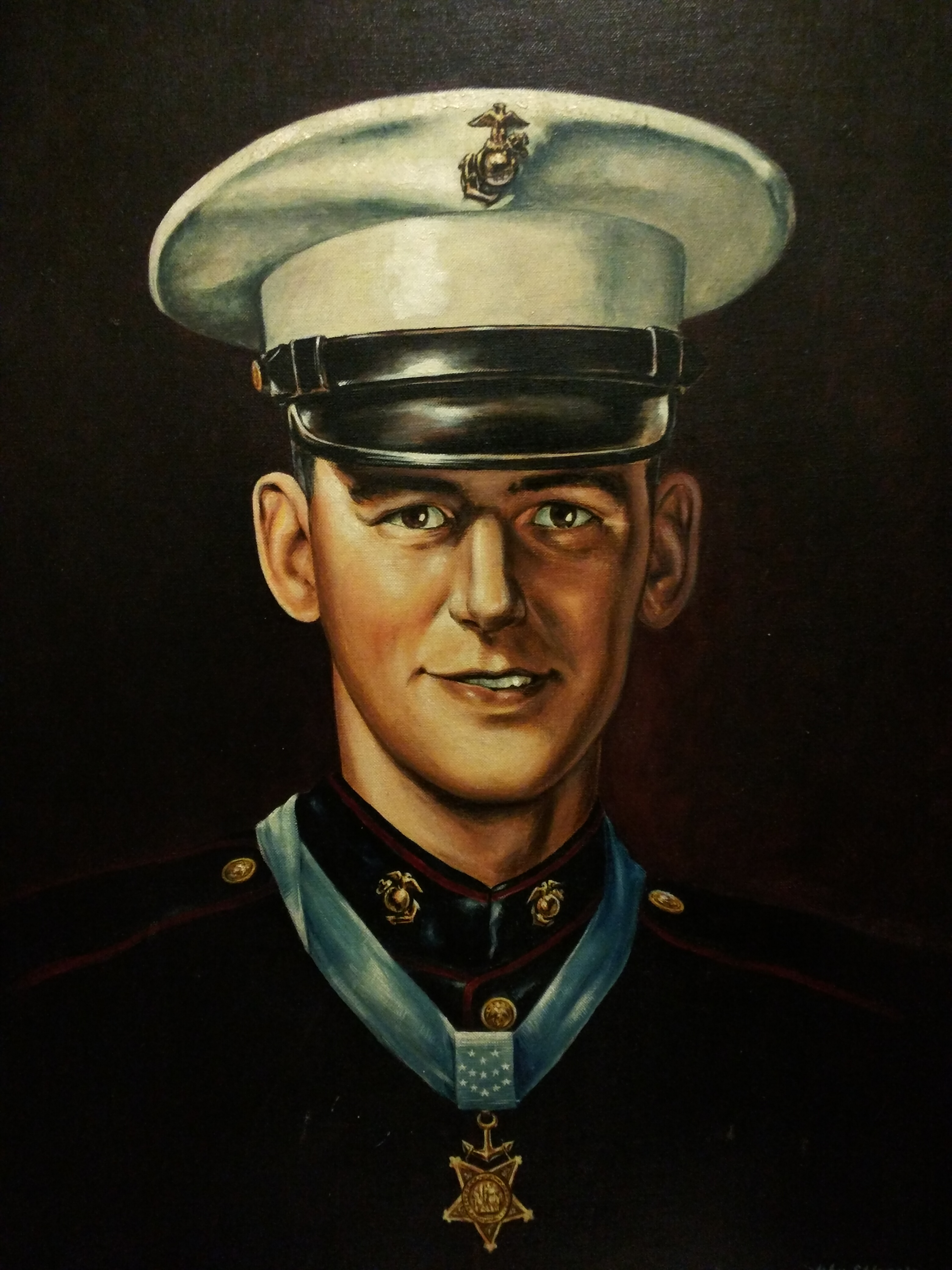
- Portrait of John D. Kelly
- Born: July 8, 1928; Youngstown, Ohio, United States
- Died: May 28, 1952 (aged 23); Korea
- Burial place: Jefferson Memorial Cemetery, Pittsburgh, Pennsylvania
- Military career
- Allegiance: United States
- Branch: United States Marine Corps
- Service years: 1951–1952
- Rank: Private First Class
- Units: C Company, 1st Battalion, 7th Marine Regiment, 1st Marine Division
- Conflicts: Korean War (DOW)
- Awards: Medal of Honor; Purple Heart

John Doran Kelly (July 8, 1928 – May 28, 1952) was a United States Marine Corps private first class who received the Medal of Honor posthumously for his heroic actions on May 28, 1952, against Chinese forces during the Korean War. Kelly was mortally wounded while destroying his third consecutive enemy machine gun position that day while serving in the 1st Marine Division.

== Early life ==
John Doran Kelly was born July 8, 1928, in Youngstown, Ohio. Soon afterwards his family moved to Homestead, Pennsylvania, where he attended grade school and high school. He graduated from high school in 1947, and was attending Arizona State College, prior to entering the United States Marine Corps during the Korean War.

== Military career ==
Kelly enlisted in the Marine Corps in August 1951, in Pittsburgh, Pennsylvania. Following his initial training at Marine Corps Recruit Depot Parris Island, South Carolina, he was transferred to Camp Pendleton for further training prior to being assigned to the 1st Marine Division which was part of the Eighth United States Army (EUSAK) in Korea. Kelly was sent to Korea and assigned as a radio operator with C Company, 1st Battalion, 7th Marine Regiment.

The 7th Marines was in division reserve after completing its redeployment from its positions in east-central Korea in March 1952 to relieve a South Korean Army division in western Korea. On May 11, the 7th Marines was moved out of reserve and replaced the 5th Marines at the front which was defending positions from enemy approaches to Seoul, the capital of South Korea. On May 26, A Company and a platoon from C Company, 1st Battalion, 7th Marines, were given a mission to take an enemy held hill to begin early in the morning under the cover of darkness on May 28. Kelly's Second Platoon was to be used as a diversionary force.

On May 28, A Company got near the base of Hill 104 and was counterattacked by a Chinese platoon size force. One of A Company's platoon's made it to the top and the fighting ended. Kelly's platoon which was used as a diversionary force in support of A Company experienced hand-to-hand fighting and was pinned down by heavy enemy fire as it advanced towards its objective. Kelly left his radio to another Marine to attack key enemy machine gun positions, destroying two in the process. Although he had been wounded in the charge on the first machine gun crew, he made another one-man assault to destroy a third enemy machine gun emplacement. He was killed as he took out the enemy position. "A" Company took control of the hill, but due to many casualties, both Marine units were called back to friendly lines. Pfc. Kelly of C Company and Cpl. David B. Champagne of A Company were both awarded the Medal of Honor posthumously for their actions that day.

Kelly is buried at Jefferson Memorial Cemetery, Pittsburgh, Pennsylvania. His grave can be found in section 20, lot 319.

== Military awards ==
Kelly's military decorations and awards include the following:

1st row	Medal of Honor		
2nd row	Purple Heart	Combat Action Ribbon	Navy Unit Commendation
3rd row	Good Conduct Medal	National Defense Service Medal	Korean Service Medal with one Campaign Star
4th row	Republic of Korea Presidential Unit Citation (Note: Awarded to 1st Marine Division, Oct. 26, 1950 – July 27, 1953)	United Nations Service Medal	Korean War Service Medal

== Medal of Honor citation ==
The President of the United States takes pride in presenting the MEDAL OF HONOR posthumously to

PRIVATE FIRST CLASS JOHN D. KELLY
UNITED STATES MARINE CORPS

for service as set forth in the following CITATION:

For conspicuous gallantry and intrepidity at the risk of his life above and beyond the call of duty while serving as a Radio Operator of Company C, First Battalion, Seventh Marines, First Marine Division (Reinforced), in action against enemy aggressor forces in Korea on 28 May 1952. With his platoon pinned down by a numerically superior enemy force employing intense mortar, artillery, small-arms and grenade fire, Private First Class Kelly requested permission to leave his radio in the care of another man and to participate in an assault on enemy key positions. Fearlessly charging forward in the face of a murderous hail of machine-gun fire and hand grenades, he initiated a daring attack against a hostile strongpoint and personally neutralized the position, killing two of the enemy. Unyielding in the face of heavy odds, he continued forward and singlehandedly assaulted a machine-gun bunker. Although painfully wounded, he bravely charged the bunker and destroyed it, killing three of the enemy. Courageously continuing his one-man assault, he again stormed forward in a valiant attempt to wipe out a third bunker and boldly delivered point-blank fire into the aperture of the hostile emplacement. Mortally wounded by enemy fire while carrying out his heroic action, Private First Class Kelly, by his great personal valor and aggressive fighting spirit, inspired his comrades to sweep on, overrun and secure the objective. His extraordinary heroism in the face of almost certain death reflects the highest credit upon himself and enhances the finest traditions of the United States Naval Service. He gallantly gave his life for his country.

/S/ DWIGHT D. EISENHOWER

== See also ==
- List of Korean War Medal of Honor recipients
