= Ralph E. Dias =

Medal of Honor recipient

Ralph Ellis Dias
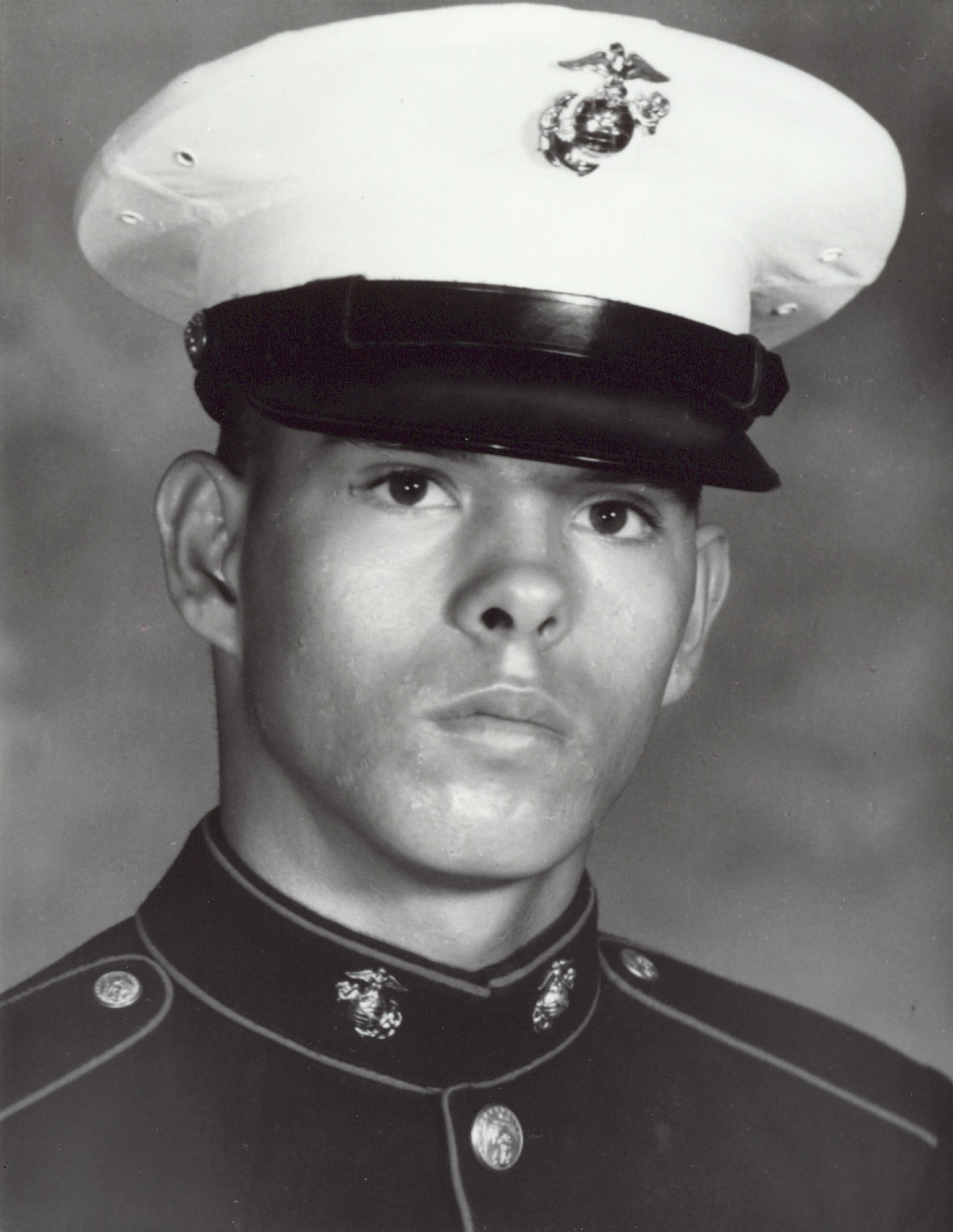
- Ralph E. Dias, Medal of Honor recipient
- Born: July 15, 1950; Shelocta, Pennsylvania, U.S.
- Died: November 12, 1969 (aged 19); Quảng Nam Province, South Vietnam
- Burial place: Oakdale Cemetery, Leetonia, Ohio, U.S.
- Military career
- Allegiance: United States of America
- Branch: United States Marine Corps
- Service years: 1967–1969
- Rank: Private First Class
- Units: Company D, 1st Battalion, 7th Marines, 1st Marine Division
- Conflicts: Vietnam War †
- Awards: Medal of Honor (1969); Purple Heart

Private First Class Ralph Ellis Dias (July 15, 1950 – November 12, 1969) was a United States Marine who posthumously received the Medal of Honor for heroism in Vietnam in November 1969.

== Biography ==
Ralph Dias was born on July 15, 1950, in Indiana County, Pennsylvania. He graduated from elementary school in 1965, then attended Elderton Joint High School in Elderton, Pennsylvania, for two years.

Dias enlisted in the United States Marine Corps on October 9, 1967, at Pittsburgh, Pennsylvania, and underwent recruit training with the 2nd Recruit Training Battalion, Marine Corps Recruit Depot Parris Island, South Carolina.

Upon completion of recruit training in December, Dias was transferred to the 2nd Infantry Training Battalion, 1st Infantry Training Regiment, Camp Lejeune, North Carolina, for special infantry training. In February 1968, he was ordered to the Marine Corps Base, Camp Pendleton, California, for duty with Company B, 1st Battalion 28th Marines, 5th Marine Division.

In April 1969, Dias was ordered to the Republic of Vietnam for duty as a rifleman with Company D, 1st Battalion, 7th Marines, 1st Marine Division, Fleet Marine Force.

Dias' medals and decorations include: the Medal of Honor, the Purple Heart, the Combat Action Ribbon, the Meritorious Unit Commendation with one bronze star, the National Defense Service Medal, the Vietnam Service Medal with three bronze stars, the Republic of Vietnam Meritorious Unit Commendation (Gallantry Cross Color) with palm and frame, the Republic of Vietnam Meritorious Unit Commendation (Civil Action Medal, First Class Color) with palm and frame, and the Republic of Vietnam Campaign Medal with device.

Private Dias was killed in action on November 12, 1969, while participating in combat in Quảng Nam Province. His heroic actions on that date were recognized with his nation's highest military honor — the Medal of Honor. Dias is buried in Oakdale Cemetery in Leetonia, Ohio.

== Medal of Honor citation ==
The President of the United States in the name of The Congress takes pride in presenting the MEDAL OF HONOR posthumously to

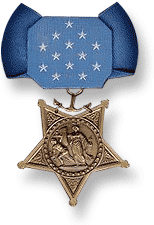

PRIVATE FIRST CLASS RALPH E. DIAS
UNITED STATES MARINE CORPS

for service as set forth in the following CITATION:

For conspicuous gallantry and intrepidity at the risk of his life above and beyond the call of duty, while serving as a Rifleman with Company D, First Battalion, Seventh Marines, First Marine Division in the Republic of Vietnam on November 12, 1969. As a member of a reaction force which was pinned down by enemy fire while assisting a platoon in the same circumstance, Private First Class Dias, observing that both units were sustaining casualties, initiated an aggressive assault against an enemy machine gun bunker which was the principal source of hostile fire. Severely wounded by enemy snipers while charging across the open area, he pulled himself to the shelter of a nearby rock. Braving enemy fire for a second time, Private First Class Dias was again wounded. Unable to walk, he crawled fifteen meters to the protection of a rock located near his objective and, repeatedly exposing himself to intense hostile fire, unsuccessfully threw several hand grenades at the machine gun emplacement. Still determined to destroy the emplacement, Private First Class Dias again moved into the open and was wounded a third time by sniper fire. As he threw a last grenade which destroyed the enemy position, he was mortally wounded by another enemy round. Private First Class Dias' indomitable courage, dynamic initiative, and selfless devotion to duty upheld the highest traditions of the Marine Corps and the United States Naval Service. He gallantly gave his life in service to his country.

/S/ RICHARD M. NIXON

== Awards and decorations ==
Dias' awards include:

1st row	Medal of Honor		Purple Heart
2nd row	Combat Action Ribbon	Navy Meritorious Unit Commendation	National Defense Service Medal
3rd row	Vietnam Service Medal with 3 Campaign stars	Vietnam Gallantry Cross with frame and palm	Vietnam Campaign Medal
Badges	Expert marksmanship badge for rifle		Expert marksmanship badge for pistol

== Legacy ==
The name Ralph E. Dias is inscribed on the Vietnam Veterans Memorial ("The Wall") on Panel 16W, Line 063. A section of state rt 344 in Leetonia has been renamed in his honor. More information may be found at http://www.morningjournalnews.com/page/content.detail/id/511243/A-day-for-Dias.html.

== See also ==
- List of Medal of Honor recipients
- List of Medal of Honor recipients for the Vietnam War
