= David B. Champagne =

United States Marine Corps corporal (1932–1952)

David Bernard Champagne
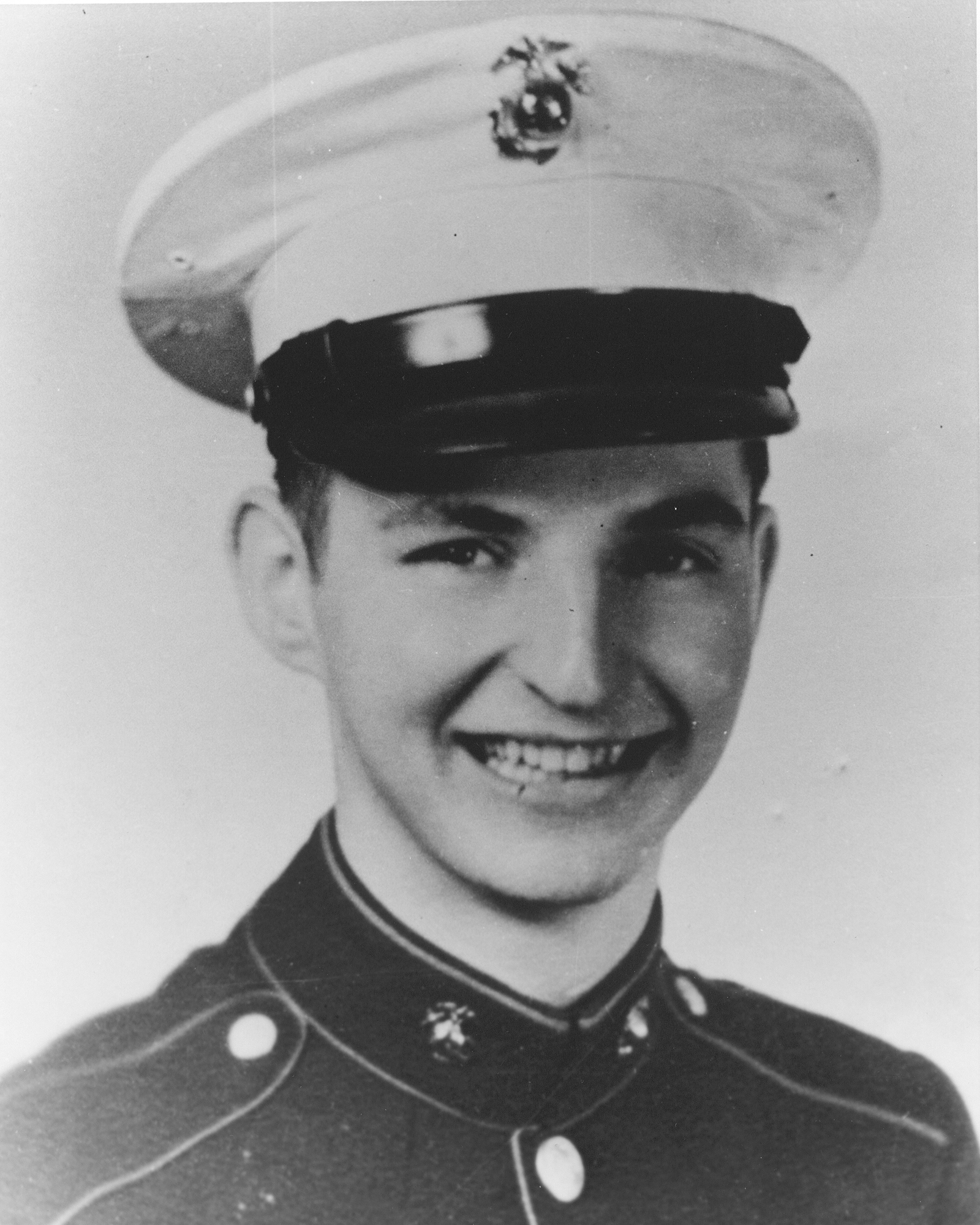
- Champagne in c. 1951
- Born: November 13, 1932; Waterville, Maine, United States
- Died: May 28, 1952 (aged 19); South Korea
- Burial place: St. Francis Catholic Cemetery, Waterville, Maine
- Military career
- Allegiance: United States
- Branch: United States Marine Corps
- Service years: 1951–1952
- Rank: Corporal
- Units: A Company, 1st Battalion, 7th Marines, 1st Marine Division
- Conflicts: Korean War
- Awards: Medal of Honor; Purple Heart (2)

David Bernard Champagne (November 13, 1932 – May 28, 1952) was a United States Marine Corps corporal who received the Medal of Honor posthumously for heroism above and beyond the call of duty on May 28, 1952, against Chinese forces in Korea during the Korean War. Champagne was mortally wounded after saving the lives of three Marines from an enemy grenade blast during a hill fight while serving in the 1st Marine Division.

== Early life ==
David Bernard Champagne was born on November 13, 1932, in Waterville, Maine, to Bernard Leo Champagne and Anna Osborne Champagne. He attended public schools in Wakefield, Rhode Island, and worked at the local community theatre prior to enlisting, at the age of 18, in the United States Marine Corps on March 7, 1951, in Boston, Massachusetts.

== Marine Corps service ==
Champagne received recruit training at Parris Island, South Carolina, and then was stationed at Camp Pendleton, California, for further training from June – August prior to being assigned to the 1st Marine Division, which was part of the Eighth United States Army in Korea. He was assigned to A Company, 1st Battalion, 7th Marine Regiment.

On August 25, 1951, the 7th Marines in Korea were ordered to relieve American and South Korean Army troops in the Punchbowl region of east-central Korea. On September 9, the 1st Battalion, 7th Marines were ordered to seize Hill 673. The hill was taken on September 12 with the help of the 2nd Battalion, 7th Marines. Afterwards the 7th Marines were in reserve. For the next six months the entire 1st Marine Division was in positional warfare. There were some local skirmishes and clashes but no real operation offensives were initiated. Champagne had deployed to Korea in October 1951.

The 7th Marines were in division reserve after completing its redeployment from its positions in east-central Korea in March 1952 to relieve a South Korean Army division in western Korea. On May 11, the 7th Marines was moved out of reserve and replaced the 5th Marines at the front which was defending positions from enemy approaches to Seoul, the capital of South Korea. On May 26, A Company and C Company's Second Platoon, 1st Battalion, 7th Marines, were given a mission to take an enemy held hill to begin early in the morning under the cover of darkness on May 28. The C Company platoon was to be used as a diversionary force.

On May 28, as A Company reached near the base of Hill 104, it was counterattacked by a Chinese platoon size force. Champagne, a fire team leader, advanced with his fire team in the initial assaults on strongly fortified and heavily defended positions. He successfully led his four-man team through enemy grenade, small-arms, and machine gun fire to the crest of the hill. Although wounded in the encounter, he refused evacuation. The enemy counterattack intensified and an enemy grenade landed in the midst of his fire team. Without hesitation, Champagne seized the grenade and threw it at the enemy. It exploded as it left his hand and hurled him out of the trench. His action saved the lives of the other three members of his fire team in his platoon. While exposed to enemy mortar fire, he was mortally wounded and the fighting ended. C Company's platoon which was used as a diversionary force in support of A Company experienced hand-to-hand fighting and was pinned down by heavy enemy fire as it assaulted towards their objective. "A" Company took control of the hill, but due to many casualties, both Marine units were called back to friendly lines. Cpl. Champagne and Pfc. John D. Kelly of C Company, were both awarded the Medal of Honor posthumously for their actions that day.

Champagne's Medal of Honor was presented to his 15-year-old brother, Reginald H. Champagne, by General Reginald H. Ridgely Jr. during presentation ceremonies held at the Old Mountain Baseball Field in Wakefield, in July 1953.

Champagne is buried in Saint Francis Catholic Cemetery in Waterville, Maine. His parents and his brother were laid to rest alongside of him.

== Medal of Honor Citation ==
The President of the United States in the name of The Congress takes pride in presenting the MEDAL OF HONOR posthumously to

CORPORAL DAVID B. CHAMPAGNE
UNITED STATES MARINE CORPS

for service as set forth in the following CITATION:

For conspicuous gallantry and intrepidity at the risk of his life above and beyond the call of duty while serving as a Fire Team Leader of Company A, First Battalion, Seventh Marines, First Marine Division (Reinforced), in action against enemy aggressor forces in Korea on May 28, 1952. Advancing with his platoon in the initial assault of the company against a strongly fortified and heavily defended hill position, Corporal Champagne skillfully led his fire team through a veritable hail of intense enemy machine-gun, small-arms and grenade fire, overrunning trenches and a series of almost impregnable bunker positions before reaching the crest of the hill and placing his men in defensive positions. Suffering a painful leg wound while assisting in repelling the ensuing hostile counterattack, which was launched under cover of a murderous hail of mortar and artillery fire, he steadfastly refused evacuation and fearlessly continued to control his fire team. When the enemy counterattack increased in intensity, and a hostile grenade landed in the midst of the fire team, Corporal Champagne unhesitatingly seized the deadly missile and hurled it in the direction of the approaching enemy. As the grenade left his hand, it exploded, blowing off his hand and throwing him out of the trench. Mortally wounded by enemy mortar fire while in this exposed position, Corporal Champagne, by his valiant leadership, fortitude and gallant spirit of self-sacrifice in the face of almost certain death, undoubtedly saved the lives of several of his fellow Marines. His heroic actions served to inspire all who observed him and reflect the highest credit upon himself and the United States Naval Service. He gallantly gave his life for his country.

/S/ DWIGHT D. EISENHOWER

== Awards and Decorations ==

1st row	Medal of Honor	Purple Heart with 5/16 inch star	Combat Action Ribbon Retroactively Awarded, 1999
2nd row	Marine Corps Good Conduct Medal	National Defense Service Medal	Korean Service Medal with 3 Campaign stars
3rd row	Korean Presidential Unit Citation	United Nations Service Medal Korea	Korean War Service Medal Retroactively Awarded, 2003

== Legacy ==
A post office and a housing project in Wakefield, Rhode Island, are named after Champagne.

== See also ==
- List of Korean War Medal of Honor recipients
- List of people from Waterville, Maine
