= Indian Gap, Texas =

- Unincorporated community
- Location within Texas Location within the United States
- Coordinates: 31°39′47″N 98°24′48″W
- Country: United States
- State: Texas
- County: Hamilton
- Elevation: 1,562 ft (476 m)
- Time zone: UTC-6 (Central (CST))
  - Summer (DST): UTC-5 (CDT)
- GNIS feature ID: 1338427

Indian Gap is an unincorporated community located between two hills in western Hamilton County in Central Texas, United States.

== History ==
Comanche Indians would use these hills to begin their raids, inspiring the name of the community. The community was settled in 1877. Hawley Gerrells was an early settler, who opened a post office in his home in 1879. At various times his home served as a store, a church, and a social center. H.A. Shipman bought the townsite and farmed it for several years. In 1889, he took over Gerrells' store and post office, and in 1892 he sold town lots. The population was 90 in the 1920s. At one point, Indian Gap had a bank, a hotel, three stores, a blacksmith shop, a gin, a barber shop, churches, and a weekly newspaper, The Arrow. The post office closed in 1972. By the 1970s, the population had declined to 36 and remained there through 2000. The population was recorded as 27 in 2010 and rose to 35 as of 2019.

== Geography ==
Indian Gap is located at the intersection of Farm to Market Roads 218 and 1702, 17 mi (27 km) west of Hamilton, 35 mi (56 km) east of Brownwood, and 40 mi (64 km) south of Stephenville in the hills of far-western Hamilton County.

== Education ==
Indian Gap had its own schools at its peak, which closed about 1959. Today, the community is served by the Hamilton Independent School District.

== Notable person ==
Indian Gap is the hometown of Frank N. Mitchell, awarded a Medal of Honor for his actions in the Korean War.
