= 1st Battalion, 7th Marines =

1st Battalion, 7th Marine Regiment
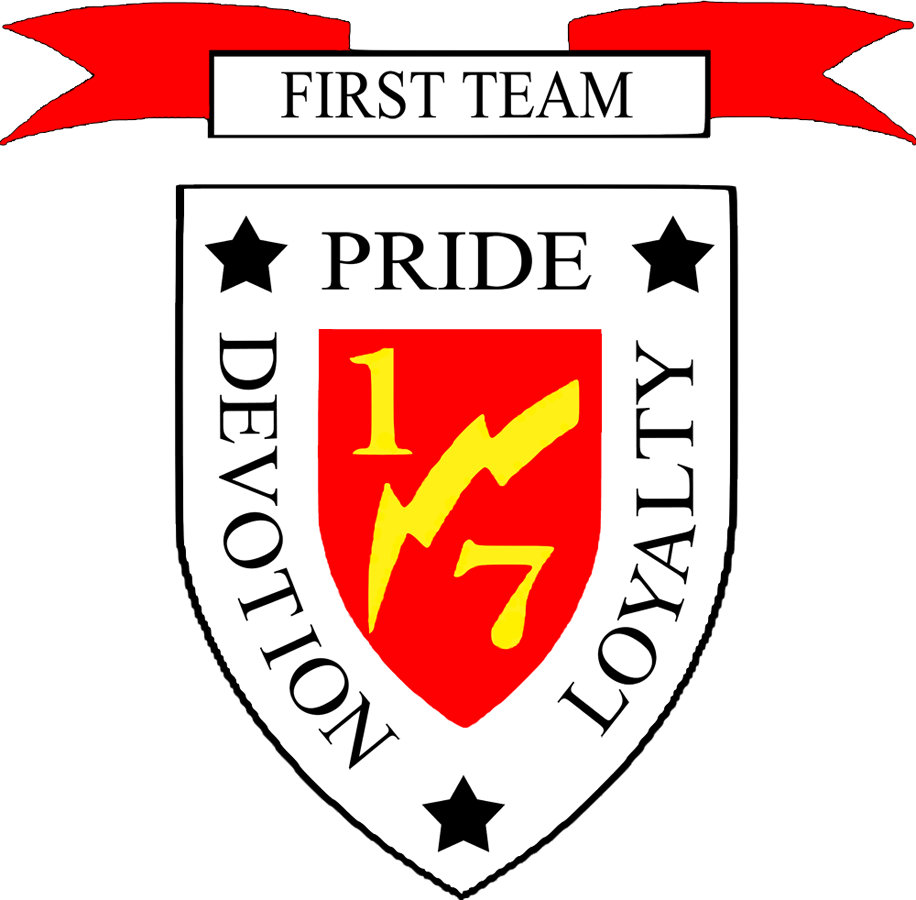
- 1st Battalion, 7th Marines insignia
- Founded: 1 April 1921
- Country: United States
- Branch: United States Marine Corps
- Type: Light infantry
- Size: 1,200
- Part of: 7th Marine Regiment; 1st Marine Division
- Garrison/HQ: Marine Corps Air Ground Combat Center Twentynine Palms, California
- Nicknames: First Team; First of the Seventh
- Mottos: "Pride, Devotion, Loyalty" "Close to Zero"
- Engagements: World War II; Guadalcanal Campaign; Battle of Cape Gloucester; Battle of Peleliu; Battle of Okinawa; Korean War; Battle of Inchon; Battle of Seoul; Battle of Chosin Reservoir; Battle of Hwacheon; Battle of the Punchbowl; Battle of Bunker Hill; First Battle of the Hook; Battle for Outpost Vegas; Battle of the Samichon River; Vietnam War; Persian Gulf War; Operation Restore Hope; Global War on Terrorism; Iraq War; War in Afghanistan; Operation Inherent Resolve

Commanders
- Current commander: Major Aaron W. Reep
- Notable commanders: Amor L. Sims; Lewis B. "Chesty" Puller; Raymond G. Davis; Leo J. Dulacki; James Mattis; Michael P. Ryan

The 1st Battalion, 7th Marines (1/7) is an infantry battalion of the 7th Marine Regiment of the United States Marine Corps. It is currently based at the Marine Corps Air Ground Combat Center Twentynine Palms. Consisting of approximately 1,000 Marines, it is part of the 1st Marine Division.

Famous Marines who have served in 1/7 include General Raymond G. Davis, General James Mattis, Lieutenant General Lewis "Chesty" Puller, and Gunnery Sergeant John Basilone.

== Subordinate units ==
- Headquarters and Service Company
- Animal Company
- Baker Company
- Charley Company
- Weapons Company

Note that unlike other infantry battalions in the Marine Corps, 1/7 does not follow the traditional usage of the NATO phonetic alphabet for naming their companies. Suicide Charley uses an outdated spelling of "Charlie" in reference to their history.

== History ==
The 1st Battalion, 7th Marine Regiment was created on 1 April 1921 in San Diego, California. In September 1924, the 1st Battalion, 7th Marines was deactivated with its personnel being absorbed by the newly organized 4th Marine Regiment. For the next twenty years 1/7 was activated, reflagged, and disbanded on numerous occasions until being reborn on 1 January 1941.

=== World War II ===
Just over a year after its rebirth, 1/7 deployed to take part in the Pacific Theater during World War II. 7th Marines and 1/11 were detached from the Division to form the 3rd Marine Brigade and were sent to Samoa. From where the battalion rejoined the 1st Marine Division, to see their first action of the war at Guadalcanal. Under its commander, Lieutenant Colonel Lewis B. "Chesty" Puller, the battalion distinguished itself many times over for valor, and bravery held its positions against the onslaught of a regiment of seasoned Japanese attackers. It was also during this campaign that Sgt "Manila John" Basilone was awarded the Medal of Honor for defending his exposed position from a comprehensive Japanese assault using only a machine gun. Throughout the remainder of the war, the "First Team" distinguished itself throughout many campaigns, including the Battle of Cape Gloucester, the Battle of Peleliu and the Battle of Okinawa.

At the end of the war in the Pacific, 1/7 deployed to China as an element of Operation Beleaguer to assist in repatriation of the defeated Japanese military to Japan.

=== Korean War ===
Following World War II, the "First of the Seventh" was sent to Camp Pendleton in California where it was deactivated on 5 March 1947. However, in response to the invasion of South Korea by the communist North Korea, the 1st Battalion, 7th Marines was again called into action. On 21 September 1950, 1/7 carried out an amphibious landing at Inchon. Once more the "First Team" distinguished itself in battle fighting its way to and from the Chosin Reservoir and in the First Battle of the Hook; Lt Col Raymond C. Davis of the battalion received the Medal of Honor for fighting at the Chosin Reservoir in North Korea.

Following the cessation of hostilities in Korea and through 1965, 1/7 spent time both in Camp Pendleton and Okinawa while maintaining its combat readiness.

=== Vietnam War ===
In August 1965, 1/7 was once again called to service, this time in South Vietnam. The 1/7 commander, Lt. Colonel James P. Kelly, led the "First Team" in 1965–1966 as they participated in numerous combat operations such as Starlite, Piranha, Mameluke Thrust and Oklahoma Hills. During these operations and many others, 1/7 was honored repeatedly, earning the Presidential Unit Citation Streamer four times and the Meritorious Unit Commendation Streamer three times. Corporal Larry Eugene Smedley, Delta Company /1/7, was awarded the Medal of Honor posthumously for action that took place on 20 December 1967, and Private First Class Ralph Dias, Delta Company, 1/7, was awarded the Medal of Honor posthumously for action that took place in November 1969. In 1998, Robert R. Ingram was awarded the Medal of Honor by President Bill Clinton for his actions on 28 March 1966, while he was assigned as a Navy hospital corpsman in B Company, 1/7.

On 19 February 1970, in the Son Thang massacre just southwest of Danang, a five-man patrol from the battalion murdered five women and eleven children. One member of the team was convicted of premeditated murder, but served less than a year in prison

=== Persian Gulf War ===
The 1st Battalion, 7th Marines, was the first unit to man defensive positions in Saudi Arabia during Operation Desert Shield in August 1990. The battalion was an integral member of Task Force Ripper. As Desert Shield became Desert Storm, 1/7 participated in the diagonal thrust to the perimeter of Kuwait City, spearheading the liberation of Kuwait from Iraq. 1/7 returned to Twentynine Palms in California, in March 1991.

=== Somali Civil War ===
On 11 December 1992, the first elements of 1st Battalion, 7th Marines, arrived at Mogadishu, Somalia for Operation Restore Hope. 1/7 operations were conducted in Baidoa, Bardera, Oddur, Afgoye and Mogadishu. The battalion relieved Task Force Mogadishu for occupation of the Stadium Complex in Mogadishu on 25 January 1993. The following night, Lance Corporal Anthony Botello was killed while on point, during a night patrol in the city. Botello was the only other Marine besides PFC Domingo Arroyo (3rd Battalion 11th Marines) to be killed in action in Somalia; 1/7 turned over their mission and area of operations in Mogadishu to the 10th Baluch Battalion on 24 April 1993 and returned to Twentynine Palms.

=== Iraq War ===
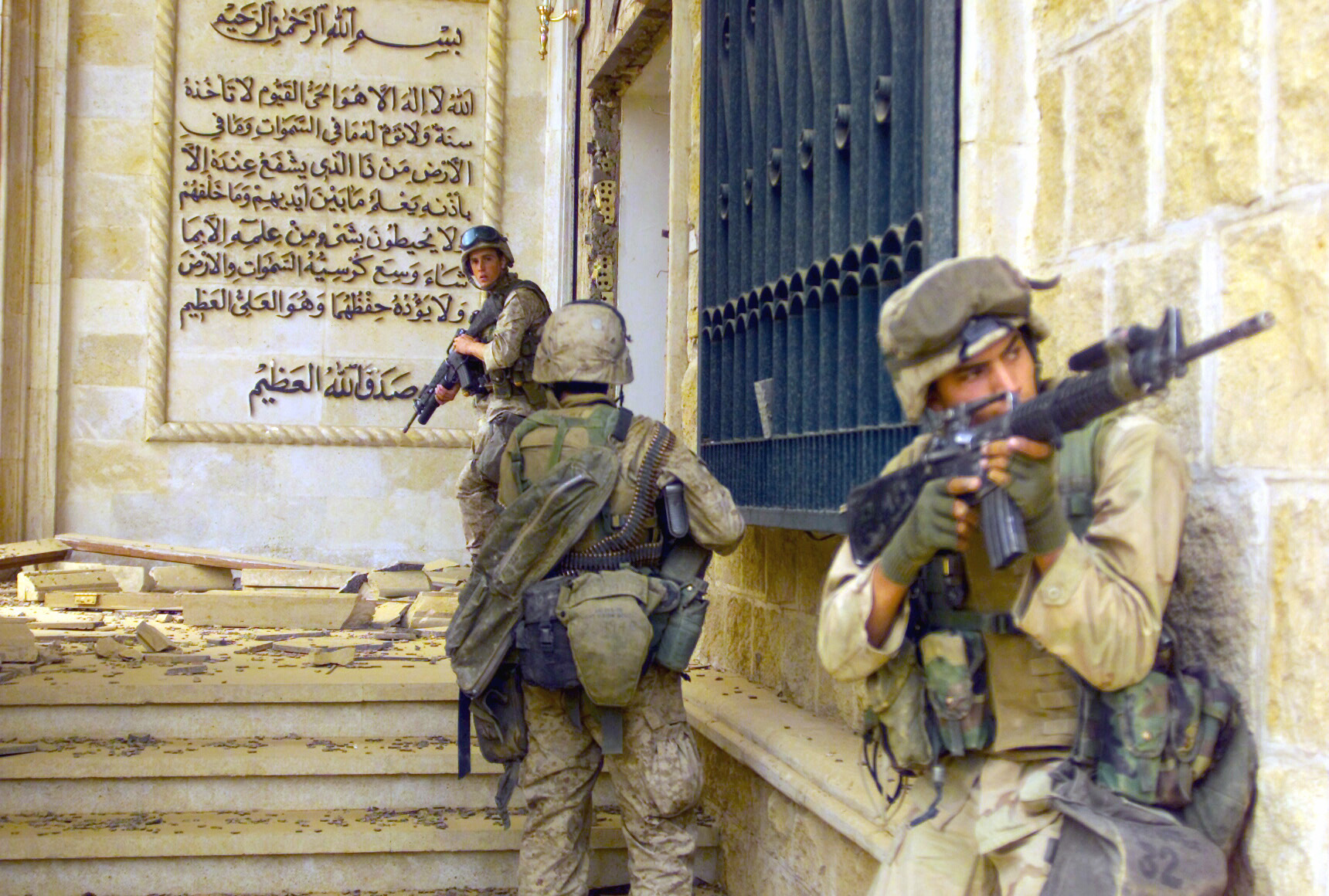
Marines from C Company, 1st Battalion, 7th Marines, enter a palace in Baghdad.

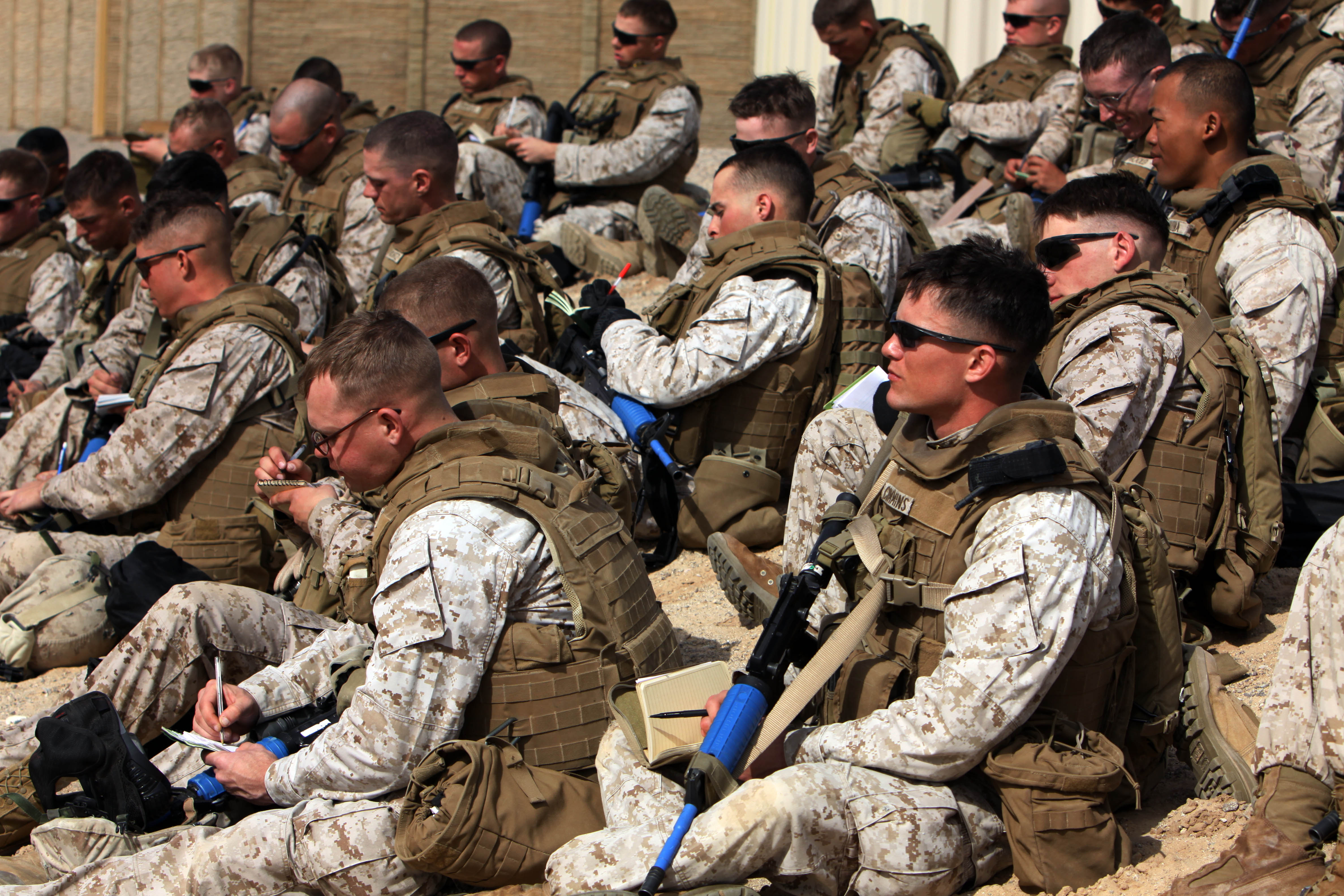
1/7 Marines in 2010.

In January 2003, 1/7 was deployed on Operation Iraqi Freedom. It crossed the Kuwaiti border into Iraq on 18 March; its first mission was to seize the strategically prominent oil pumping and control station in Az Zubayr. This station was so important because more than 50% of Iraq's oil was controlled by it. 1/7 saw significant combat action on its way to Baghdad and in the streets of the Iraqi capital. On 23 April, 1/7 turned over control of their sector to the U.S. Army and took up positions in the city of An Najaf. After countless extensions, the battalion returned to Twentynine Palms, on 5 October 2003.

In August 2004, 1/7 deployed once more, but this time to Western Iraq in support of Operation Iraqi Freedom II. There the battalion conducted security operations in the cities and roadways along the Euphrates River and Syrian border to include Husaybah, Karabilah, Sadah, Ubaydi, Al Qa'im, Haditha, Hit and Haqlania. Involved in combat operations on a daily basis, 1/7 personnel conducted mounted and dismounted urban patrols, cordon knocks, Main Supply Route (MSR) security, sweep operations and border security to clear the battalion's Area of Operation (AO) of enemy insurgents.

In March 2006, 1/7 again deployed to Iraq and operated near the Iraqi-Syrian border, conducting dismounted urban patrols, weapons cache sweeping and vehicle checkpoints. The battalion returned in September 2006.

1/7 returned to Western Al Anbar in August 2007. Assigned to AO Hīt, "Task Force 1/7" conducted thousands of combat patrols and weapon cache sweeps. TF 1/7 found over 22,000 pieces of ordnance during the deployment and captured over 200 suspected terrorists and criminals. TF 1/7 was partnered with two Iraqi infantry battalions and two police districts. The training and development of the Iraqi units was so successful that the city of Hit was the first city within the Al Anbar Province to be returned to Iraqi control. The battalion returned to Twentynine Palms in March 2008.

In February 2009, 1/7 returned to the Al Anbar province. Assigned to Fallujah and Al-Karmah, it was tasked to maintain security in the area with close cooperation with Iraqi police, the Iraqi Army and Provincial Security Forces. Upon departing the region in August and September 2009, 1/7 turned over the AO to Iraqi control before returning to the United States.

=== War in Afghanistan ===
In March 2012, the 1st Battalion, 7th Marines deployed to Sangin District, Helmand Province, Afghanistan to conduct counterinsurgency operations and support the transition of authority from U.S. forces to the Afghan National Security Forces. The battalion returned in October 2012.

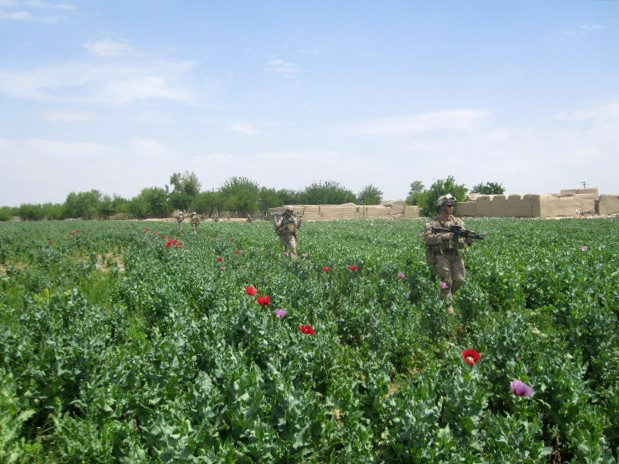
1/7 Marines patrol through a field in Sangin district, April 2012.

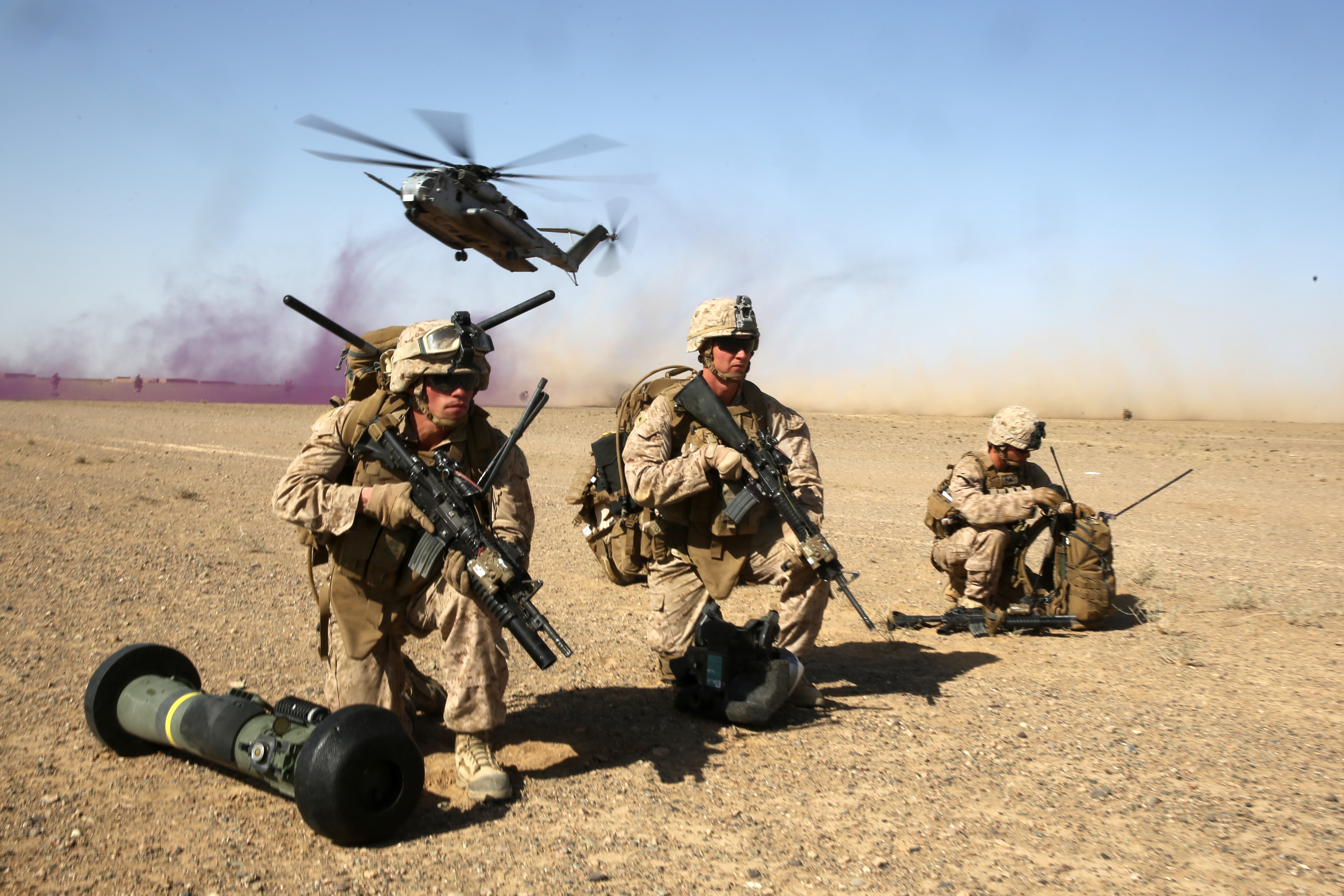
Marines with Weapons Company, 1/7, land during a mission in Helmand province, Afghanistan, 28 April 2014.

In March 2014, 1/7 again deployed to Helmand Province, Afghanistan. The battalion retrograded from Sangin district on 5 May 2014, and turned over security responsibility of the area to the Afghan National Army. 1st Battalion, 7th Marines, was the final Marine Corps unit to occupy FOB Sabit Qadam and the surrounding area in Sangin District. During the battalion's approximately seven-month-long deployment, the "First Team" was responsible for a number of successful missions throughout Helmand province.

"They should be proud of what they contributed to the campaign," said Brig. Gen. Daniel Yoo. "They have been involved in everything from the northern Helmand retrograde from Sangin, which was historic for the Marine Corps but also for 1st Battalion, 7th Marines, because of their previous deployment there. They were involved in the central Helmand liftoff to support our U.K. brothers as they picked up and moved out of Lashkar Gah. They were involved in elections prep from both the primary elections and the runoff elections." Amidst the battalion's success came two devastating incidents. The first incident occurred while providing security, 25 June, when Sgt. Thomas Spitzer, a Scout Sniper assigned to the Scout Sniper Platoon, was killed in action. The second occurred during a dismounted combat patrol, 9 Aug., when Staff Sgt. Brandon Dodson, a platoon sergeant with Baker Co., stepped on an improvised explosive device. Dodson was severely injured, but he maintains a positive attitude and is committed toward his recovery at Walter Reed National Military Medical Center.

On 1 October 2014, the 1st Battalion, 7th Marines, transferred their area of responsibility to 3rd Squadron, 3rd Cavalry Regiment, a U.S. Army command based out of Fort Hood, Texas.

== Medal of Honor recipients ==
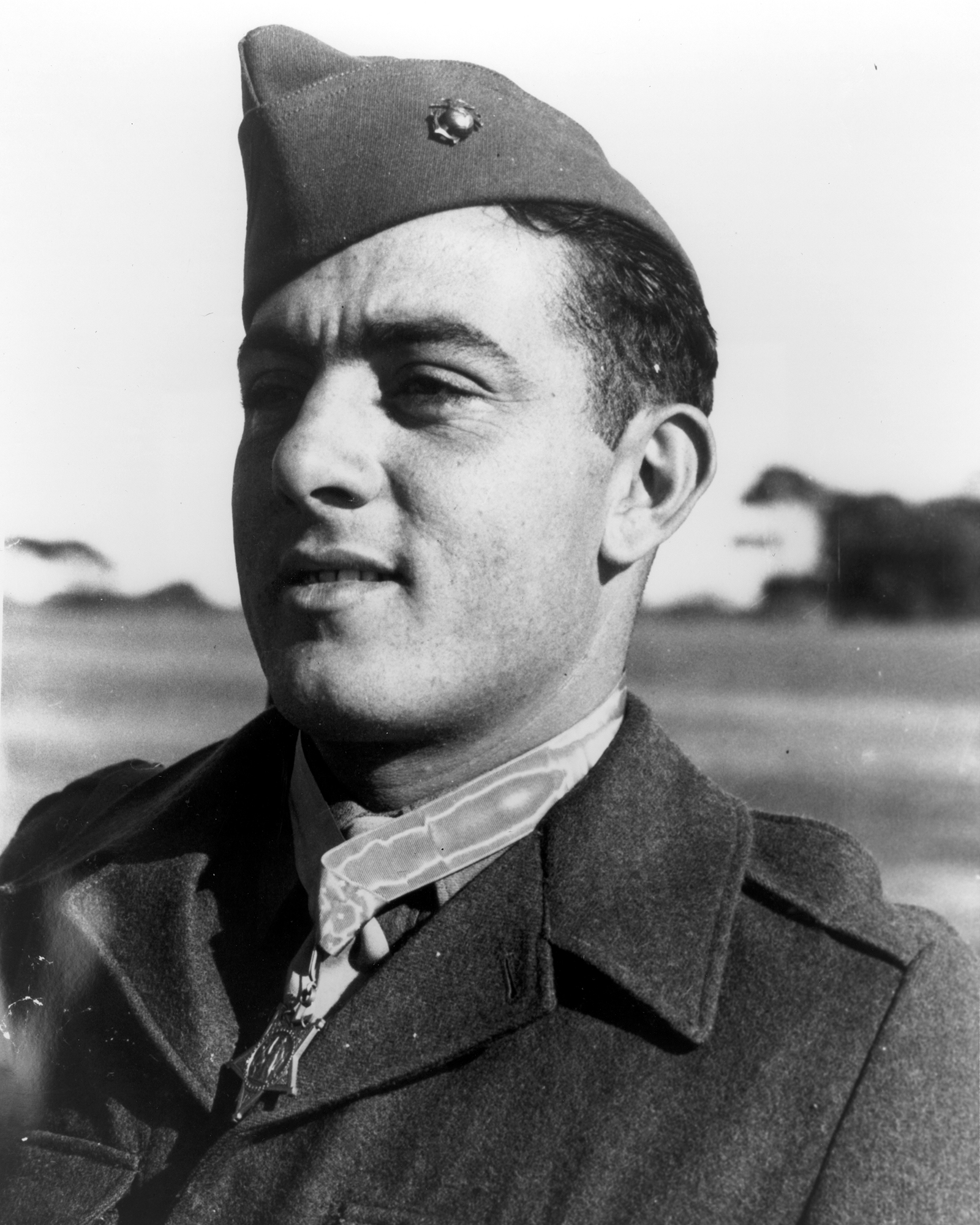
John Basilone in his Marine Corps uniform.

World War II

- GySgt John Basilone- Guadalcanal, 24–25 October 1942

Korean War

- Lt Col Raymond G. Davis – North Korea, 1–4 December 1950
- SSgt Archie Van Winkle – North Korea, 2 November 1950

Posthumous:

- Cpl David B. Champagne – South Korea, 28 May 1952
- PFC John D. Kelly – South Korea, 28 May 1952
- PFC Herbert A. Littleton – South Korea, 22 April 1951
- Sgt Frederick W. Mausert, III – South Korea, 12 September 1951
- 1st Lt Frank N. Mitchell – North Korea, 26 November 1950
- Sgt James I. Poynter – North Korea, 4 November 1950

Vietnam War

- HM3 Robert R. Ingram, USN – South Vietnam, 28 March 1966

Posthumous:

- PFC Ralph E. Dias – South Vietnam, 12 November 1969
- Cpl Larry E. Smedley, South Vietnam, 20–21 December 1967

== Notable former members ==
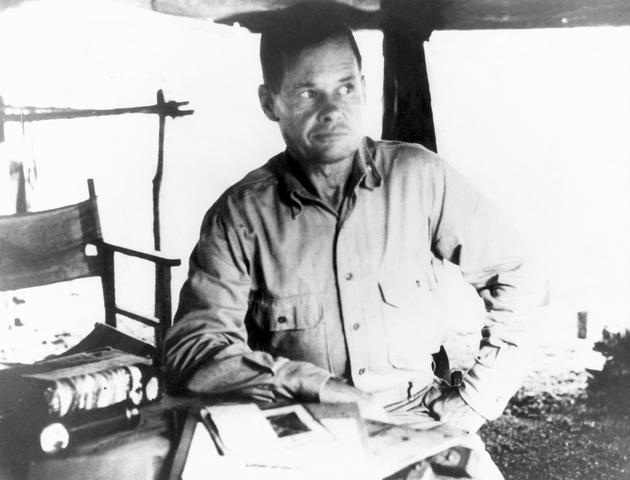
Lt. Col. Puller, Guadalcanal, September 1942.

- Kurt Chew-Een Lee, Korean War
- William Atwater, Vietnam War
- James Mattis, Gulf War
- Chesty Puller, World War II
- Dale Shewalter, Vietnam War
- Bing West, Vietnam War

== See also ==
- History of the United States Marine Corps
- List of United States Marine Corps battalions
- Organization of the United States Marine Corps
