= Corporal Larry E. Smedley National Vietnam War Museum =

Museum in Orlando, Florida, US

Corporal Larry E. Smedley National Vietnam War Museum, formerly National Vietnam Veterans War Museum, is a museum located in Orlando, Florida, in Orange County, Florida. 3400 N. Tanner Rd, Orlando, FL 32826. Exhibitions include Vietnam War artifacts, equipment, and photographs. The museum's collection includes an A-4 Skyhawk, a "River Rat" patrol boat, a commemorative wall, Bell UH-1 "Huey" Dustoff helicopter, a C-7 Caribou cockpit flown by Air America, patriotic art, and a Vietnam War mural. The museum is named for the late Larry E. Smedley, a Marine corporal who led his squad courageously against numerically superior forces and was awarded the Medal of Honor posthumously.
