= Larry E. Smedley =

Larry Eugene Smedley
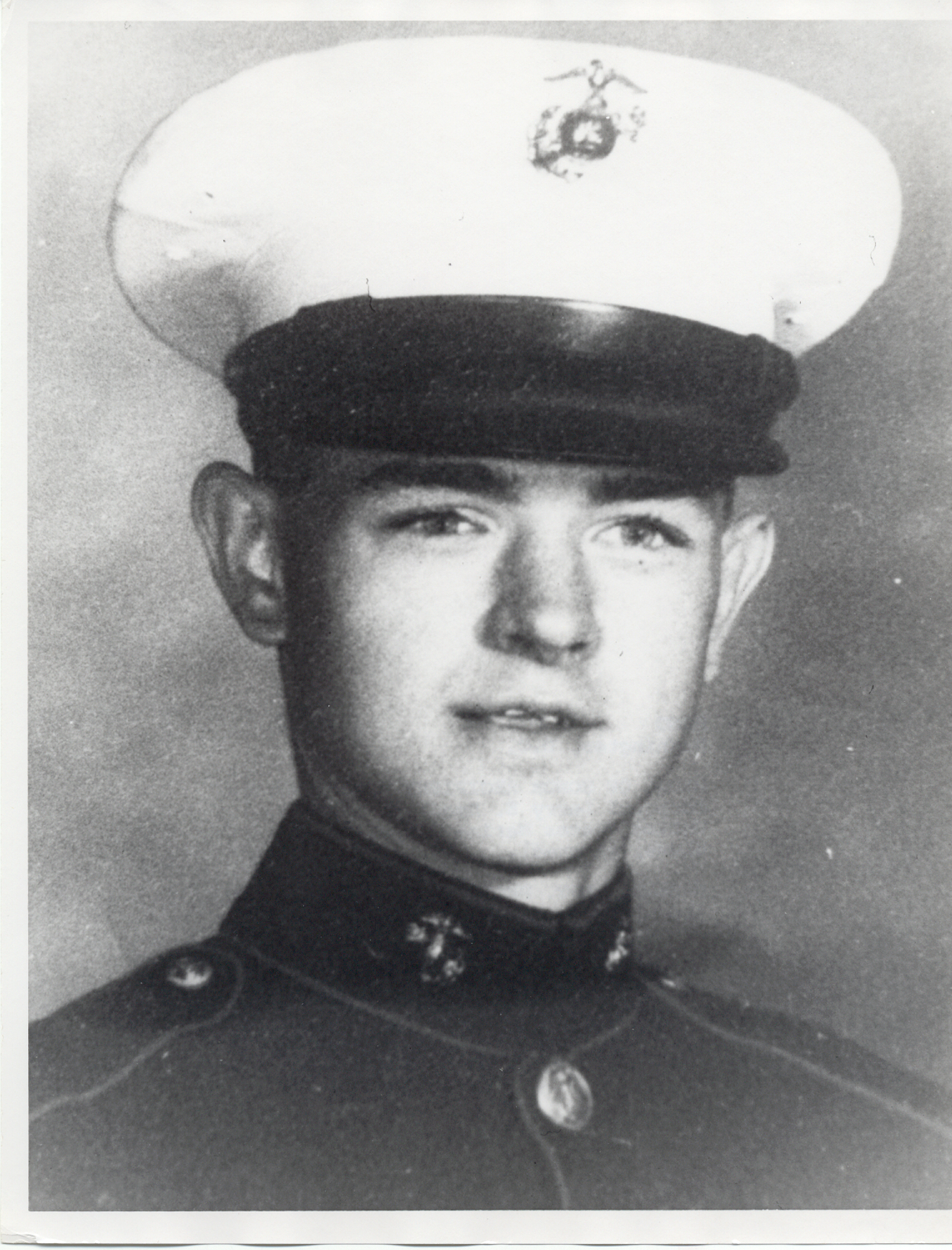
- Larry E. Smedley, posthumous Medal of Honor recipient
- Born: March 4, 1949; Front Royal, Virginia, US
- Died: December 21, 1967 (aged 18); Quảng Nam Province, Republic of Vietnam
- Burial place: Arlington National Cemetery
- Military career
- Allegiance: United States of America
- Branch: United States Marine Corps
- Service years: 1966–1967
- Rank: Corporal
- Units: Company D, 1st Battalion, 7th Marines, 1st Marine Division
- Conflicts: Vietnam War †
- Awards: Medal of Honor; Purple Heart

Corporal Larry Eugene Smedley (March 4, 1949 – December 21, 1967) was a United States Marine who posthumously received the United States' highest military decoration — the Medal of Honor — for his actions in December 1967 in Quảng Nam Province, Republic of Vietnam. The Corporal Larry E. Smedley National Vietnam War Museum in Florida is named for him.

== Biography ==
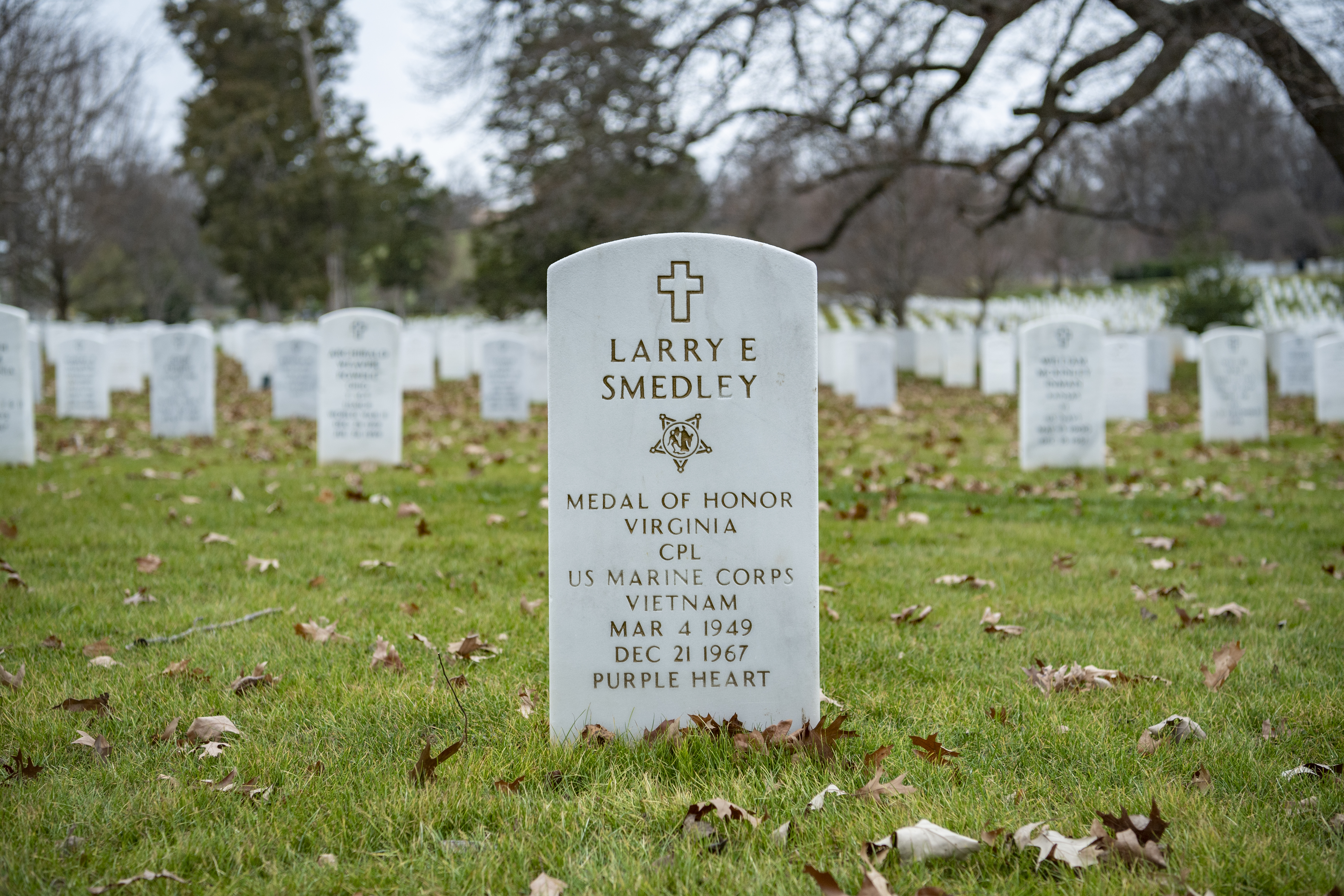
Grave at Arlington National Cemetery

Larry Eugene Smedley was born on March 4, 1949, in Front Royal, Virginia. He attended elementary schools in Berryville, Virginia; Augusta, Georgia; Union Park, Florida; Howard Junior High School in Orlando, Florida, and Colonial High School, leaving the latter in 1966 a few days after he turned 17. Although he did not graduate from high school, in 2008 the school board awarded him an honorary high school diploma posthumously.

He enlisted in the United States Marine Corps on March 18, 1966, at Orlando, Florida, then reported to the Marine Corps Recruit Depot Parris Island, South Carolina, and underwent recruit training with the 1st Recruit Training Battalion. In July 1966, he completed individual combat training with the 2nd Infantry Training Battalion, 1st Infantry Training Regiment, Marine Corps Base Camp Lejeune, North Carolina.

Upon completion of recruit training, Pvt Smedley served as a rifleman and fire team leader with Companies D and C, respectively, 1st Battalion, 8th Marines, 2nd Marine Division, Camp Lejeune. He was promoted to private first class on September 1, 1966, and to lance corporal on January 1, 1967.

In July 1967, Lance Corporal Smedley arrived in the Republic of Vietnam. He was assigned duty as a rifleman and squad radio man with Company D, 1st Battalion, 7th Marines, 1st Marine Division, and was promoted to corporal on September 1, 1967. While on patrol in Quảng Nam Province on December 21, 1967, he was mortally wounded in the action for which he earned the Medal of Honor.

Larry Smedley was buried with full military honors at Arlington National Cemetery, Arlington, Virginia.

== Awards and decorations ==
Cpl Smedley's awards include:

Medal of Honor	Purple Heart	Presidential Unit Citation
National Defense Service Medal	Vietnam Service Medal with one bronze star	Republic of Vietnam Campaign Medal

== Medal of Honor citation ==
The President of the United States in the name of The Congress takes pride in presenting the MEDAL OF HONOR posthumously to

CORPORAL LARRY E. SMEDLEY
UNITED STATES MARINE CORPS

for service as set forth in the following CITATION:

For conspicuous gallantry and intrepidity at the risk of his life above and beyond the call of duty while serving as a squad leader with Company D, First Battalion, Seventh Marines, First Marine Division, in connection with operations against the enemy in the Republic of Vietnam. On the evenings of 20–21 December 1967, Corporal Smedley led his six-man squad to an ambush site at the mouth of Happy Valley, near Phouc Ninh (2) in Quang Nam Province. Later that night, an estimated 100 Viet Cong and North Vietnamese Army Regulars, carrying 122 mm rocket launchers and mortars, were observed moving toward Hill 41. Realizing this was a significant enemy move to launch an attack on the vital Danang complex, Corporal Smedley immediately took sound and courageous action to stop the enemy threat. After he radioed for a reaction force, he skillfully maneuvered his men to a more advantageous position and led an attack on the numerically superior enemy force. A heavy volume of fire from an enemy machine gun positioned on the left flank of the squad inflicted several casualties on Corporal Smedley's unit. Simultaneously, an enemy rifle grenade exploded nearby, wounding him in the right foot and knocking him to the ground. Corporal Smedley disregarded this serious injury and valiantly struggled to his feet, shouting words of encouragement to his men. He fearlessly led a charge against the enemy machine gun emplacement, firing his rifle and throwing grenades until he was again struck by enemy fire and knocked to the ground. Gravely wounded and weak from loss of blood, he rose and commenced a one-man assault against the enemy position. Although his aggressive and singlehanded attack resulted in the destruction of the machine gun, he was struck in the chest by enemy fire and fell mortally wounded. Corporal Smedley's inspiring and courageous actions, bold initiative, and selfless devotion to duty in the face of certain death were in keeping with the highest traditions of the Marine Corps and the United States Naval Service. He gallantly gave his life for his country.

/S/ RICHARD M. NIXON

== Memorials ==
The Larry E. Smedley National Vietnam War Museum
In 2010, and with honor, the National Vietnam War Museum in Orlando, Florida added Corporal Smedley's name to the official name of the museum. Located east of Orlando in unincorporated Orange County, the museum is located at 3400 North Tanner Road, Orlando, Florida 32826.

The Wall
Larry Eugene Smedley has his name inscribed on the Vietnam Veterans Memorial ("The Wall") on Panel 32E Line 040.

Marine Corps League
The Marine Corps League Detachment #64 is named in honor of Cpl Larry E. Smedley.

Corporal Larry E. Smedley Combined Maintenance Facility
In 2003, with the dedication of a new tri-service Armed Forces Reserve Center facility for the Army Reserve, Navy Reserve and Marine Corps Reserve in Orlando, Florida, the Combined Maintenance Facility for the complex supporting Army Reserve and Marine Reserve vehicles was named in Corporal Smedley's honor.

Corporal Larry E. Smedley Medal of Honor Highway
By act of the Florida Legislature, a section of Interstate Highway 4 (I-4) between the city of Orlando in Orange County, Florida and the city of Altamonte Springs in Seminole County, Florida was renamed in Corporal Smedley's honor in 2005.

Corporal Larry E. Smedley's Memorial Plaque
Corporal Smedley's full Presidential Citation for the Medal of Honor is etched into a special plaque in front of the Orange County, Florida courthouse. It is part of a monument in memory of those Orange County, Florida residents, Corporal Smedley among them, who gave their lives for their country in World War I, World War II, the Korean War, the Vietnam War, and the Iraq War.

Corporal Larry E. Smedley Memorial Bridge
Located on U.S. Route 340 between Page and Warren County, Virginia.

Corporal Larry E. Smedley Hallway
Located at Colonial High School, inside building 2 at the main campus where the school's AFJROTC program is located. Corporal Smedley attended Colonial High School shortly before leaving right after he turned 17 to enlist in the USMC.

== See also ==
- List of Medal of Honor recipients
- List of Medal of Honor recipients for the Vietnam War
