= James I. Poynter =

United States Marine Corps Medal of Honor recipient

James Irsley Poynter
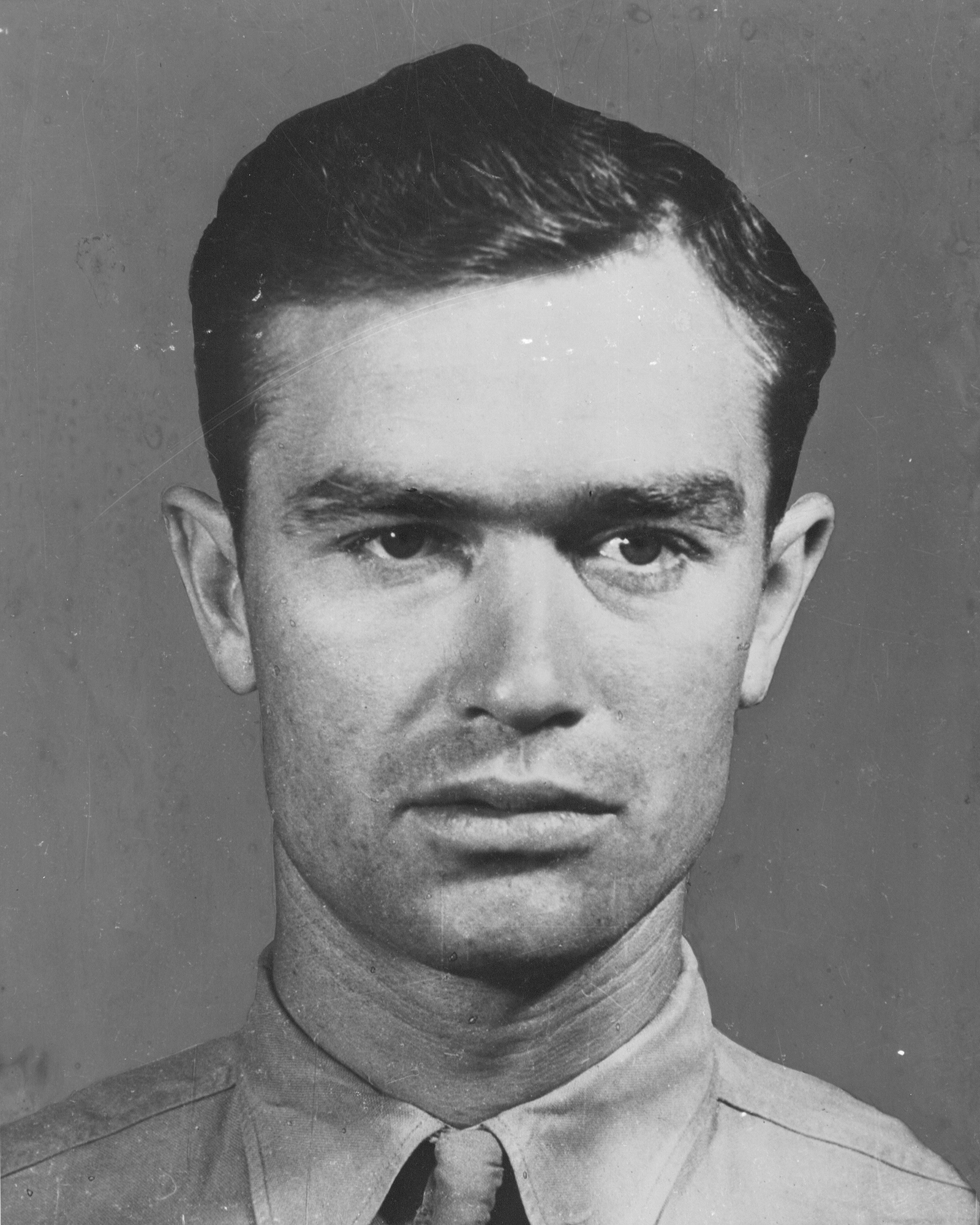
- James I. Poynter
- Born: December 1, 1916; Bloomington, Illinois
- Died: November 4, 1950 (aged 33) near Sudong, North Korea
- Burial place: Fort Rosecrans National Cemetery, San Diego, California
- Military career
- Allegiance: United States of America
- Branch: United States Marine Corps
- Service years: 1942–1946, 1950
- Rank: Sergeant
- Units: Company A, 1st Battalion, 7th Marine Regiment, 1st Marine Division
- Conflicts: World War II: Battle of Guadalcanal; Battle of Saipan; Battle of Tinian; Battle of Okinawa; Korean War: Second Battle of Seoul; Chosin Reservoir advance †
- Awards: Medal of Honor; Bronze Star w/ Combat "V"; Purple Heart; Combat Action Ribbon

James Irsley Poynter (December 1, 1916 – November 4, 1950) was a United States Marine Corps sergeant who served in World War II and the Korean War where he was killed in action. He was posthumously awarded the United States' highest military decoration for valor — the Medal of Honor — for his actions as a platoon squad leader on November 4, 1950, in which he singlehandedly charged and destroyed three enemy machine gun positions in North Korea at the cost of his life while a member of the 1st Marine Division.

Poynter was the eleventh Marine to be awarded the Medal of Honor in Korea.

== Biography ==
James Irsley Poynter was born to Eugene and Molly Poynter on December 1, 1916, in Bloomington, Illinois. He was married twice and had four children.

He enlisted in the regular Marine Corps in February 1942. He fought in the Pacific Theatre during World War II, participating in the Guadalcanal, Southern Solomons, Saipan, Tinian and Okinawa campaigns. Poynter was discharged in February 1946.

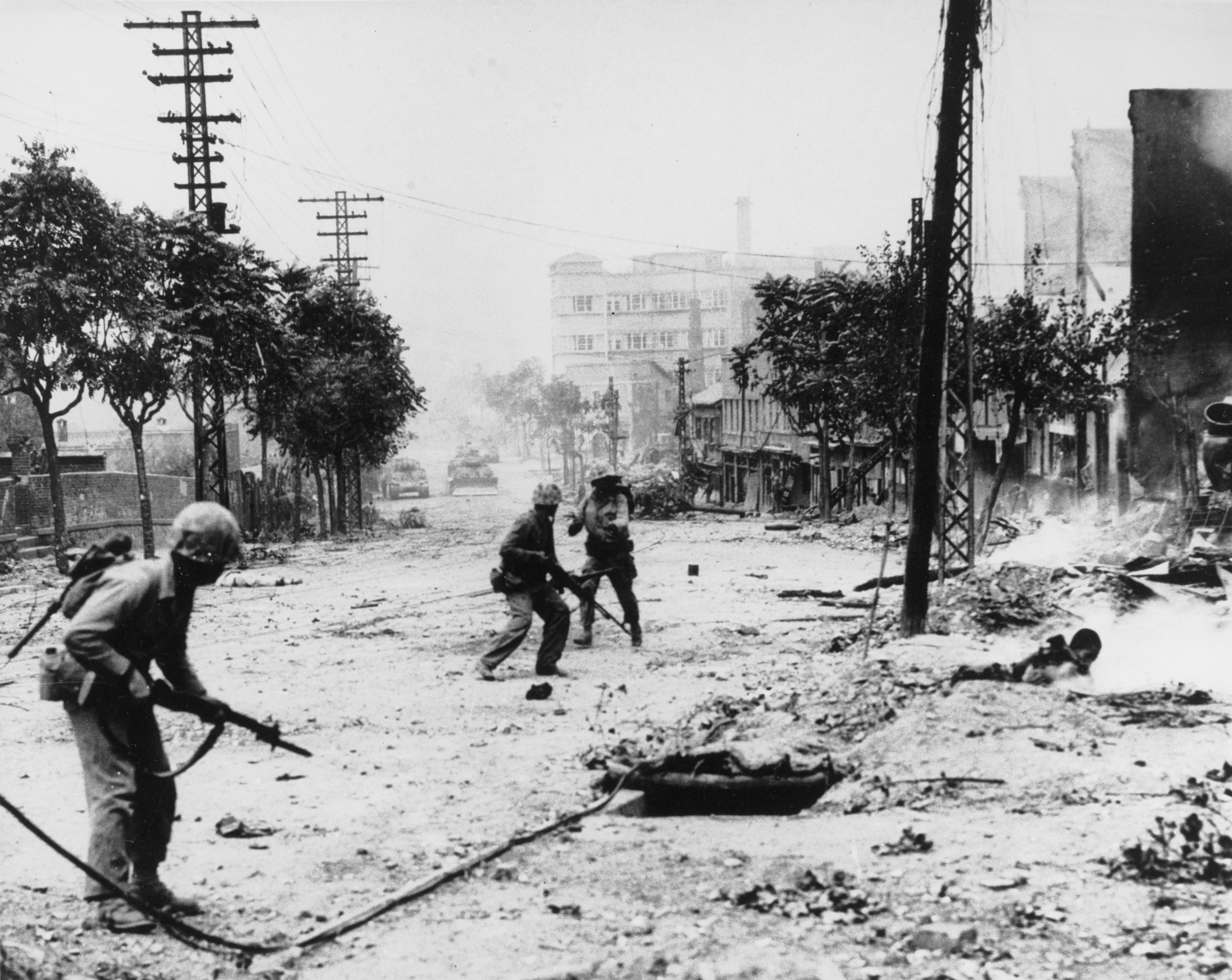
U.S. Marines fighting to liberate Seoul, Korea, in September 1950

At the beginning of the Korean War, Poynter re-enlisted in the Marine Corps, joining the 13th Infantry Battalion, Marine Corps Reserve in Los Angeles on July 19, 1950. He was assigned to A Company, 1st Battalion, 7th Marine Regiment, 1st Marine Division, after the 7th Marines were activated on August 17 at Camp Pendleton. The 7th Marines and Poynter sailed for Japan on September 1. On September 21, the 7th Marines made an amphibious landing at Inchon, South Korea. His regiment including the 1st Battalion, then rejoined the 1st Marine Division which had made an assault landing at Inchon on September 15, and participated with the division in the battle of Seoul against North Korean forces; On September 24, Poynter took command of one of the rifle squads in A Company. On September 26, Poynter's rifle platoon led by their platoon commander, assaulted and overcame a well defended hill. The 7th Marines landed ashore next at Wonsan on October 27.

Afterwards, the 1st Marine Division headed by the 7th Marines were directed to march into North Korea to Hamhung, their objective, the Chosin Reservoir, a man-made lake. The 7th Marines were to proceed north of Hamhung to relieve a South Korean unit which had fought with Chinese Communist forces (Chinese troops entered North Korea on October 19 and launched an offensive on October 25). On November 2, the 7th Marines reached the South Koreans with little opposition (November 1 was the first confrontation between the Chinese and the U.S. military). However, Chinese presence increased after this. On November 3, as A Company was in a defensive position near Hamhung, 1st Lieutenant Frank Mitchell's platoon in A Company which Poynter was a member of, was hit hard suddenly by the Chinese and almost overrun. Mitchell rallied his men including Poynter to repel the attack and Mitchell, although painfully wounded in the ensuing action, refused to be evacuated until the danger of a serious break-through was averted.

On November 4, as the 7th Marines were advancing to the Chosin Reservoir, Lt. Mitchell's platoon defended Hill 532, south of Sudong. Poynter was wounded there in hand-to-hand combat with the enemy. In spite of his wounds, when he saw three machine guns setting up only 25 yards (23 m) away, he charged the machine gun positions with hand grenades taken from fallen members of his squad, and was able to take out two machine guns. He was killed as he destroyed the third machine gun emplacement; on November 15, the 7th Marines and the 1st Marine Division completed their move north to Hagaru-ri, at the southern tip of the reservoir. The division was to proceed more north to Yudamni, on the western side of the Chosin Reservoir and to seize it, which was done with little resistance on November 25. The Battle of Chosin Reservoir began the evening of November 27.

Poynter was awarded the Bronze Star Medal with Combat "V" (posthumous) for "outstanding leadership, ability and courageous aggressiveness against the enemy" as a squad leader from September 24 to October 4, 1950. He was awarded the Medal of Honor (posthumous) for his actions on November 4, 1950, "By his self-sacrificing and valiant conduct, Sergeant Poynter inspired the remaining members of his squad to heroic endeavor in bearing down upon and repelling the disorganized enemy, thereby enabling the platoon to move out of the trap to a more favorable tactical position".

On September 4, 1952, Sgt. Poynter's Medal of Honor was posthumously presented to his widow Kathern Poynter from Secretary of the Navy Dan A. Kimball at the Pentagon.

Sgt. Poynter was buried on February 3, 1955, with full military honors in Fort Rosecrans National Cemetery, San Diego, California.

== Medal of Honor citation ==
The President of the United States takes pride in presenting the MEDAL OF HONOR posthumously to

SERGEANT JAMES I. POYNTER
UNITED STATES MARINE CORPS RESERVE

for service as set forth in the following CITATION:

For conspicuous gallantry and intrepidity at the risk of his life above and beyond the call of duty while serving as a Squad Leader in a Rifle Platoon of Company A, First Battalion, Seventh Marines, First Marine Division (Reinforced), in action against enemy aggressor forces during the defense of Hill 532, south of Sudong, Korea, on 4 November 1950. When a vastly outnumbering, well-concealed hostile force launched a sudden, vicious counterattack against his platoon's hasty defensive position, Sergeant Poynter displayed superb skill and courage in leading his squad and directing its fire against the onrushing enemy. With his ranks critically depleted by casualties and he himself critically wounded as the onslaught gained momentum and the hostile force surrounded his position, he seized his bayonet and engaged in bitter hand-to-hand combat as the break-through continued. Observing three machine guns closing in at a distance of 25 yards, he dashed from his position and, grasping hand grenades from fallen Marines as he ran, charged the emplacements in rapid succession, killing the crews of two and putting the other out of action before he fell, mortally wounded. "By his self-sacrificing and valiant conduct, Sergeant Poynter inspired the remaining members of his squad to heroic endeavor in bearing down upon and repelling the disorganized enemy, thereby enabling the platoon to move out of the trap to a more favorable tactical position. His indomitable fighting spirit, fortitude and great personal valor maintained in the face of overwhelming odds sustain and enhance the finest traditions of the United States Naval Service. He gallantly gave his life for his country.

/S/ HARRY S. TRUMAN

== Awards and Decorations ==
Sgt. Poynter's military awards include the following:

1st row	Medal of Honor	Bronze Star Medal with "V" Device	Purple Heart with 5/16 inch star
2nd row	Combat Action Ribbon with 5/16 inch star	Navy Presidential Unit Citation with 2 Service stars	Marine Corps Good Conduct Medal
3rd row	American Campaign Medal	Asiatic-Pacific Campaign Medal with 4 Campaign stars	World War II Victory Medal
4th row	Navy Occupation Service Medal	National Defense Service Medal	Korean Service Medal with 2 Campaign stars
5th row	Korean Presidential Unit Citation	United Nations Service Medal Korea	Korean War Service Medal Retroactively Awarded, 2003

== See also ==
- List of Korean War Medal of Honor recipients
