= Robert R. Ingram =

United States Navy Medal of Honor recipient

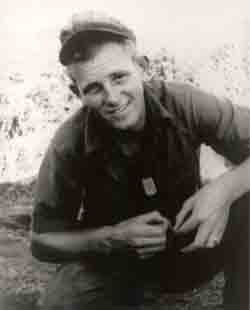
- Navy Corpsman Robert Ingram in Vietnam
- Born: January 20, 1945 (age 81); Clearwater, Florida
- Military career
- Allegiance: United States
- Branch: United States Navy
- Service years: 1963–1968
- Rank: Hospital Corpsman Third Class
- Nickname: "Doc"
- Units: Company C, 1st Battalion, 7th Marine Regiment
- Conflicts: Vietnam War
- Awards: Medal of Honor; Silver Star; Purple Heart

Robert Roland Ingram (born January 20, 1945) is a retired United States Navy hospital corpsman third class and a recipient of the Medal of Honor, the United States' highest military decoration, for heroism during the Vietnam War.

== Military career ==
Ingram was born in Clearwater, Florida. He joined the United States Navy from Coral Gables, Florida in September 1963. He completed recruit training and Hospital Corps School in San Diego, California, and the Fleet Marine Force, Field Medical Service School at Camp Pendleton, California. Afterwards, he was assigned to B Company, 1st Battalion, 7th Marine Regiment, 1st Marine Division. He was then reassigned and transferred to C Company of the 1st Battalion, 7th Marines.

Ingram was sent with his battalion from Okinawa to Vietnam in July 1965 as a hospital corpsman third class. For his heroism in treating several Marines of C Company while under enemy fire on February 8, 1966, he was awarded the Silver Star. On March 28, during a firefight with North Vietnamese forces in Quang Ngai Province, Republic of Vietnam, Ingram continued to attend to wounded Marines after being seriously wounded by enemy gunfire four times.

Ingram's Medal of Honor was presented to him by President Bill Clinton on July 10, 1998 during a ceremony in the White House, alongside twenty-four of the men he served with in Vietnam. The delay in the award, made more than thirty years after the battle, was attributed to lost paperwork.

== Post-military career ==
In January 2025, outgoing Secretary of the Navy Carlos Del Toro announced that the 99th Arleigh Burke-class destroyer, DDG-149, would be named USS Robert R. Ingram in his honor.

== Military awards ==
Ingram's military awards and decorations include:

Medal of Honor	Silver Star	Purple Heart
Navy Combat Action Ribbon	National Defense Service Medal	Vietnam Service Medal w/ FMF Combat Operation Insignia and two 3/16" bronze stars
Republic of Vietnam Meritorious Unit Citation (Gallantry Cross) w/ Palm and Frame	Republic of Vietnam Meritorious Unit Citation (Civil Actions) w/ Palm and Frame	Republic of Vietnam Campaign Medal w/ 1960– device

=== Medal of Honor citation ===
Ingram's official Medal of Honor citation reads:

The President of the United States in the name of The Congress takes pleasure in presenting the MEDAL OF HONOR to

HOSPITAL CORPSMAN THIRD CLASS ROBERT R. INGRAM
UNITED STATES NAVY

for service as set forth in the following

CITATION:

For conspicuous gallantry and intrepidity at the risk of his life above and beyond the call of duty while serving as Corpsman with Company C, First Battalion, Seventh Marines against elements of a North Vietnam Aggressor (NVA) battalion in Quang Ngai Province Republic of Vietnam on 28 March 1966. Petty Officer Ingram accompanied the point platoon as it aggressively dispatched an outpost of an NVA battalion. The momentum of the attack rolled off a ridge line down a tree covered slope to a small paddy and a village beyond. Suddenly, the village tree line exploded with an intense hail of automatic rifle fire from approximately 100 North Vietnamese regulars. In mere moments, the platoon ranks were decimated. Oblivious to the danger, Petty Officer Ingram crawled across the bullet spattered terrain to reach a downed Marine. As he administered aid, a bullet went through the palm of his hand. Calls for "CORPSMAN" echoed across the ridge. Bleeding, he edged across the fire swept landscape, collecting ammunition from the dead and administering aid to the wounded. Receiving two more wounds before realizing the third wound was life-threatening, he looked for a way off the face of the ridge, but again he heard the call for corpsman and again, he resolutely answered. Though severely wounded three times, he rendered aid to those incapable until he finally reached the right flank of the platoon. While dressing the head wound of another corpsman, he sustained his fourth bullet wound. From sixteen hundred hours until just prior to sunset, Petty Officer Ingram pushed, pulled, cajoled, and doctored his Marines. Enduring the pain from his many wounds and disregarding the probability of his demise, Petty Officer Ingram's intrepid actions saved many lives that day. By his indomitable fighting spirit, daring initiative, and unfaltering dedications to duty, Petty Officer Ingram reflected great credit upon himself and upheld the highest traditions of the United States Naval Service.

/S/ Bill Clinton

== See also ==
- List of Medal of Honor recipients for the Vietnam War
