= USS Robert R. Ingram =

Future US Navy destroyer

History

United States
- Name: Robert R. Ingram
- Namesake: Robert R. Ingram
- Builder: Bath Iron Works
- Identification: Hull number: DDG-149
- Status: Authorized for construction

General characteristics
- Class & type: Arleigh Burke-class destroyer
- Displacement: 9,217 tons (full load)
- Length: 510 ft (160 m)
- Beam: 66 ft (20 m)
- Propulsion: 4 × General Electric LM2500 gas turbines 100,000 shp (75,000 kW)
- Speed: 31 knots (57 km/h; 36 mph)
- Complement: 380 officers and enlisted
- Armament: Guns: 1 × 5-inch (127 mm)/62 Mk 45 Mod 4 (lightweight gun); 1 × 20 mm (0.8 in) Phalanx CIWS; 2 × 25 mm (0.98 in) Mk 38 machine gun system; 4 × 0.50 in (12.7 mm) caliber guns; Missiles: 1 × 32-cell, 1 × 64-cell (96 total cells) Mk 41 vertical launching system (VLS): RIM-66M surface-to-air missile; RIM-156 surface-to-air missile; RIM-174A Standard ERAM; RIM-161 anti-ballistic missile; RIM-162 ESSM (quad-packed); BGM-109 Tomahawk cruise missile; RUM-139 vertical launch ASROC; Torpedoes: 2 × Mark 32 triple torpedo tubes: Mark 46 lightweight torpedo; Mark 50 lightweight torpedo; Mark 54 lightweight torpedo
- Armor: Kevlar-type armor with steel hull. Numerous passive survivability measures.
- Aircraft carried: 2 × MH-60R Seahawk helicopters
- Aviation facilities: Double hangar and helipad

USS Robert R. Ingram (DDG-149) is the planned 99th and final ship of the Arleigh Burke-class (Flight III) Aegis guided missile destroyer of the United States Navy. She is named for United States Navy hospital corpsman Robert R. Ingram, who was awarded the Medal of Honor, for his actions during the Vietnam War.

== Design and construction ==
In January 2025, the Secretary of the Navy announced that an Arleigh Burke-class guided-missile destroyer would be named after a recipient of the Medal of Honor, Robert R. Ingram. The ship would be built by Bath Iron Works.

On May 6, 2026, United States senator Susan Collins announced a contract had been awarded to Bath Iron Works to build the Robert R. Ingram.
