= S. M. Heath =

American politician

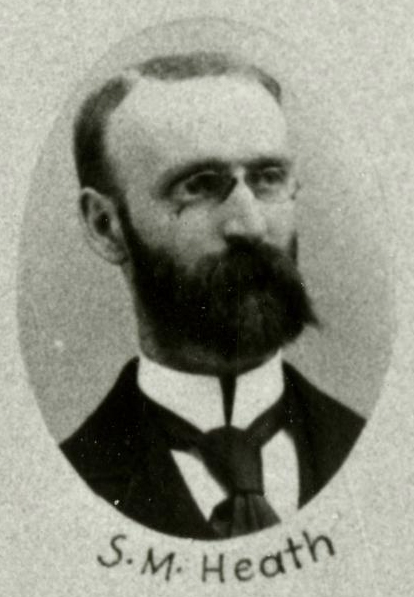
- Heath in 1895

Member of the Washington House of Representatives for the 28th district
- In office 1895–1897

Personal details
- Born: August 27, 1859 Waterville, Maine, United States
- Died: April 3, 1919 (aged 59) Hoquiam, Washington, United States
- Party: Republican

Sidney Moor Heath (August 27, 1859 – April 3, 1919) was an American politician in the state of Washington. He served in the Washington House of Representatives from 1895 to 1897.
