= Pacification of Samar =

Counterinsurgency operation during the Philippine-American War

- Part of the post-war insurgency phase of the Philippine–American War
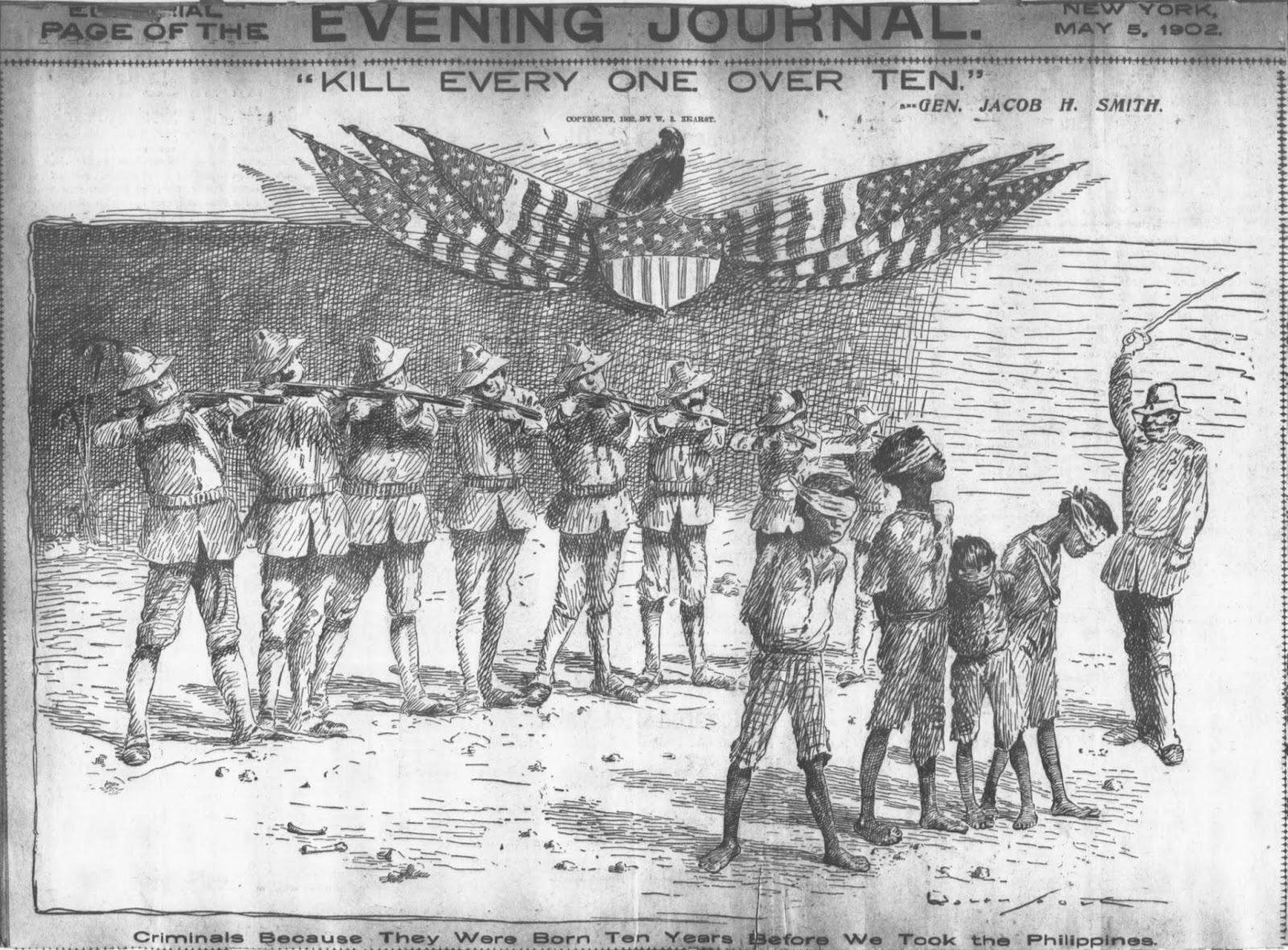
- Editorial cartoon depicting atrocities carried out by U.S. Marines during the Samar campaign
| Date | December 8, 1901–February 22, 1902 |
| Location | Samar, Insular Government of the Philippine Islands |
| Result | American victory: Capture of Vicente Lukban; Court-martial of Jacob H. Smith |

Belligerents
| United States | Philippine nationalists |

Commanders and leaders
| Adna Chaffee; Jacob H. Smith | Vicente Lukban (POW) |

Units involved
| U.S. Marine Corps | Philippine Republican Army |

Casualties and losses
| Unknown | 39 |
- Civilian casualties: 2,000–5,000 dead

The Pacification of Samar was a counterinsurgency operation initiated by General Adna Chaffee during the Philippine-American War, following the Balangiga massacre. General hostilities had largely ceased following the capture of Emilio Aguinaldo, president of the insurgent Philippine Republic, and his publication of a manifesto on April 10, 1901 acknowledging and accepting U.S. sovereignty throughout the Philippines.

General Vicente Lukban had been the commander, under Aguinaldo, of a guerilla force on the island of Samar and had, when offered the opportunity to surrender, replied that he intended to fight on to the end. In September, in an action that became known as the Balangiga massacre, Lukban's forces assisted by townspeople in a surprise uprising inflicted 54 killed and 18 wounded on a U.S. Army company garrisoning that town. Following this, General Jacob H. Smith was tasked with the pacification of Samar.

During the pacification, Smith ordered an indiscriminate retaliation which involved stopping the flow of food and causing extensive destruction in order to make the people of Samar abandon their support for the rebels out of fear and malnutrition and turn to the Americans instead. He also ordered his forces to "kill everyone over the age of ten [and make the island] a howling wilderness." Despite Smith's subordinate Littleton Waller partly revoking his order, between 2,000 and 2,500 civilians died as a result of the punitive campaign; some historians put the number as high as 5,000 victims. Some sources place the death toll as high as 50,000, but these are now believed to have resulted from typographical errors and misreading of documents. Smith was court-martialed for his conduct of operations on Samar. Waller was also later tried for ordering or allowing the execution of a dozen Filipino porters.

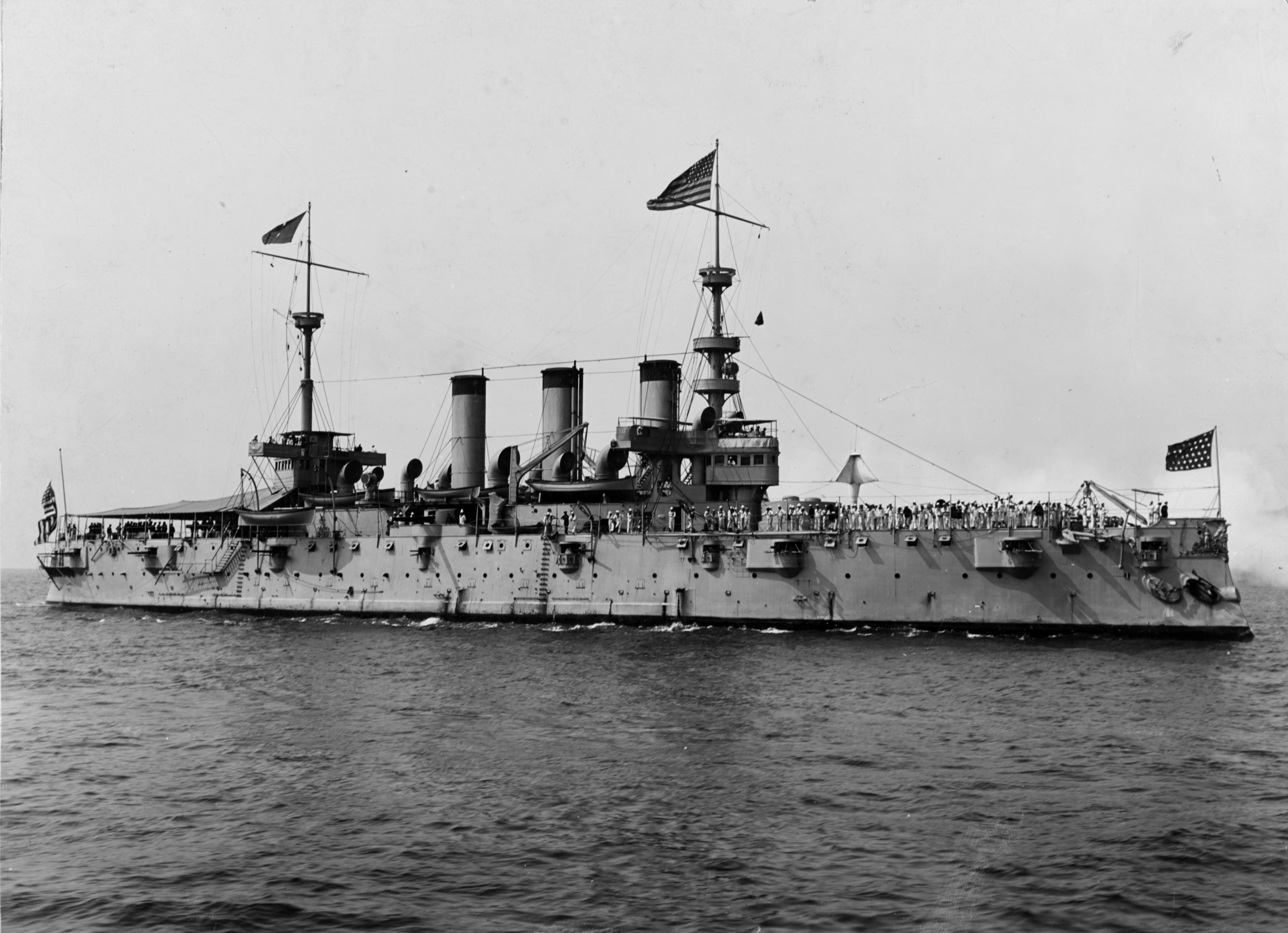
USS New York (ACR-2) as she appeared around the time of the Spanish–American War

== Assignment of Marines ==
A battalion of U.S., Marines, under Major Littleton Waller and composed of Companies C, D and H, First Regiment, and Company F, Second Regiment, equipped in heavy marching order, embarked on the flagship of the Asiatic Fleet, the armored cruiser USS New York at Cavite, October 22, 1901. The battalion arrived at Catbalogan, Samar, on October 24, and the men and supplies were transferred to the USS Zafiro. Preceded by the USS Frolic, carrying Rear Admiral Rodgers and staff and Brigadier General Smith and his aides, the Zafiro proceeded through the straits between Samar and Leyte to Tacloban, Leyte, and then to Basey, Samar, where Major Waller disembarked his headquarters and two companies and relieved some units of the Ninth Infantry. The remainder of the battalion took aboard a 3-inch landing gun along with a 6 millimeter M1895 Colt–Browning machine gun and proceeded to Balangiga, on the south coast of Samar, where Captain Porter was left in command with 159 men, relieving the 17th U. S. Infantry, with instructions to begin operations as soon as possible. Major Waller then returned to Basey.

== General Smith's orders ==
General Smith instructed Major Waller regarding the conduct of pacification:

I want no prisoners. I wish you to kill and burn; the more you kill and burn, the better it will please me ... The interior of Samar must be made a howling wilderness ...

— Gen. Jacob H. Smith

As a consequence of this order, Smith became known as "Howling Wilderness Smith". He further ordered Waller to have all persons killed who were capable of bearing arms and in actual hostilities against the United States. When queried by Waller regarding the age limit of these persons, Smith replied that the limit was ten years of age. However, it was known that Smith earned his sobriquet, "Hell-Roaring Jake" not due to his violence in war, but because of his penchant for making outrageous oaths and the extravagance of his language.

== Waller countermands Smith's orders ==
Waller pulled aside Captain Porter, one of the officers chiefly responsible for carrying it out, and countermanded Smith's order, telling Porter to show restraint.

"Porter, I've had instructions to kill everyone over ten years old. But we are not making war on women and children, only on men capable of bearing arms. Keep that in mind no matter what other orders you receive."

Waller therefore, did not execute Smith's orders. Instead, Waller applied the rules of civilized warfare and the rules provided under General Orders No. 100 of 1863 dealing with irregular warfare, which stated that if enemy units gave no quarter and became treacherous upon capture, it was lawful to shoot anyone belonging to that captured unit.

The Judge Advocate General of the Army later observed that only the good sense and restraint of the majority of Smith's subordinates prevented a complete reign of terror in Samar. However, the abuses were still sufficient to outrage anti-Imperialist groups in the United States when these became known in March 1902.

== Pacification operations ==
Food and trade to Samar were cut off, intended to starve the revolutionaries into submission. Smith's strategy on Samar involved widespread destruction to force the inhabitants to stop supporting the guerrillas and turn to the Americans from fear and starvation. He used his troops in sweeps of the interior in search of guerrilla bands and in attempts to capture Philippine General Vicente Lukbán, but he did nothing to prevent contact between the guerrillas and the townspeople. American columns marched across the island, destroying homes and shooting people and draft animals. Major Waller, in a report, stated that over an eleven-day period his men burned 255 dwellings, shot 13 carabaos, killed 39 people, and took 18 more prisoner.

The exact number of civilian casualties will never be known, but an encyclopedic book on casualties in warfare puts the figure at 2,000; an exhaustive research made by a British writer in the 1990s put the figure at about 2,500; Filipino historians believe it to be around 50,000. The rate of Samar's population growth slowed as refugees fled from Samar to Leyte, yet still the population of Samar increased by 21,456 during the war. A great loss of life is not supported.

The Marines' area of operations was southern Samar and encompassed the towns of Balangiga and Basey. The situation in the vicinity was very tense because of the Balangiga incident and other recent happenings; hence the pacification measures prescribed were somewhat retaliatory.

On November 5, Major Waller took a detachment to the Sohoton River and drove the guerrillas from their trenches there; two Marines were killed. A number of small expeditions were sent up the Cadacan River; several of these parties were fired on, but the skirmishes were slight. In an engagement, November 8, at Iba, several insurgents were killed and captured. An expedition under Captain Porter, sent out to scout in the vicinity of Balangiga, killed one insurgent and captured seven, and found many relics of the killed men of the Ninth Infantry.

As a result of the continual harassment by the Marines along the southern coast of Samar, General Lukbán and his insurgents fell back from that region and occupied their fortified defenses on the Sohoton cliffs, along the Sohoton River. About the middle of November three columns of Marines were sent into the Sohoton region to attack this stronghold, which had been reported by scouts and others to be practically impregnable. Two of the columns, under the command of Captains Porter and Bearss, marched on shore, while the third column, commanded by Major Waller, went up the river in boats. The plan of attack was for the three columns to unite on November 16 at the enemy's stronghold and make a combined assault.

On November 17, the shore column struck the enemy's trail and soon came upon a number of bamboo guns. One of these guns, emplaced to command the trail, had the fuse burning. Acting corporal Harry Glenn rushed forward and pulled out the fuse. The attack of the Marines was a complete surprise, and the enemy was routed. After driving the insurgents from their positions the Marines crossed the river and assaulted the cliff defenses. In order to reach the enemy's position, the Marines had to climb the cliffs, which rose sheer from the river to the height of about 200 feet and were honeycombed with caves, to which access was had by means of bamboo ladders, and also by narrow ledges with bamboo hand rails. Tons of rocks were suspended in cages held in position by vine cables (known as bejuco), in readiness to be precipitated upon people and boats below. The guerrillas were unable to spring their trap, however, because of heavy covering fire provided by Medal of Honor recipient Gunnery Sergeant John H. Quick on the Colt machine gun. The Marines scaled the 200 foot cliffs and with their Krag–Jørgensen rifles and .45 Caliber pistols, drove the insurgents from their positions and destroyed their camps. Major Waller's detachment, coming up the river in boats, did not arrive in time for the attack, which fact probably saved it from disaster; instant destruction would have undoubtedly been the fate of the boats had they undertaken the ascent of the river before the shore column had dislodged the insurgents.

Further pursuit of the enemy at this time was abandoned because the rations were exhausted and the men were in bad shape. The volcanic stone had cut the men's shoes to pieces, many of them were barefooted, and all had bad feet. The men had overcome incredible difficulties and dangers in their march. The positions which they had destroyed must have taken several years to prepare. Reports from old prisoners said they had been there years working on the defenses. No white troops had ever penetrated to these positions, and they were held as a final rallying point. The insurrectos of Samar had spent years of labor on the defenses, and considered the cliff fortifications impregnable. No Marines were killed in the attack., which resulted in the deaths of around 30 insurgents and the capture of General Lukbán and his lieutenants. Two of the Marine officers involved in the action, Captains Porter and Bearss, would both later receive the Medal of Honor for their conduct.

== End of resistance ==
Effective resistance on Samar ended after Lukban's capture. Smith reported by February 22, 1902 that resistance had "crumbled away"'

== Bibliography ==
- Miller, Stuart Creighton (1982). "Benevolent Assimilation": The American Conquest of the Philippines, 1899–1903. Yale University Press. ISBN 978-0-300-16193-9.
- Fritz, David L. (1979). Military Affairs Vol. 43, No. 4.
