= Battle of Veracruz (1914) =

1914 U.S. invasion of the city of Veracruz during the Mexican Revolution

Coordinates: 19.1900°N 96.1531°W

- Part of the Mexican Revolution
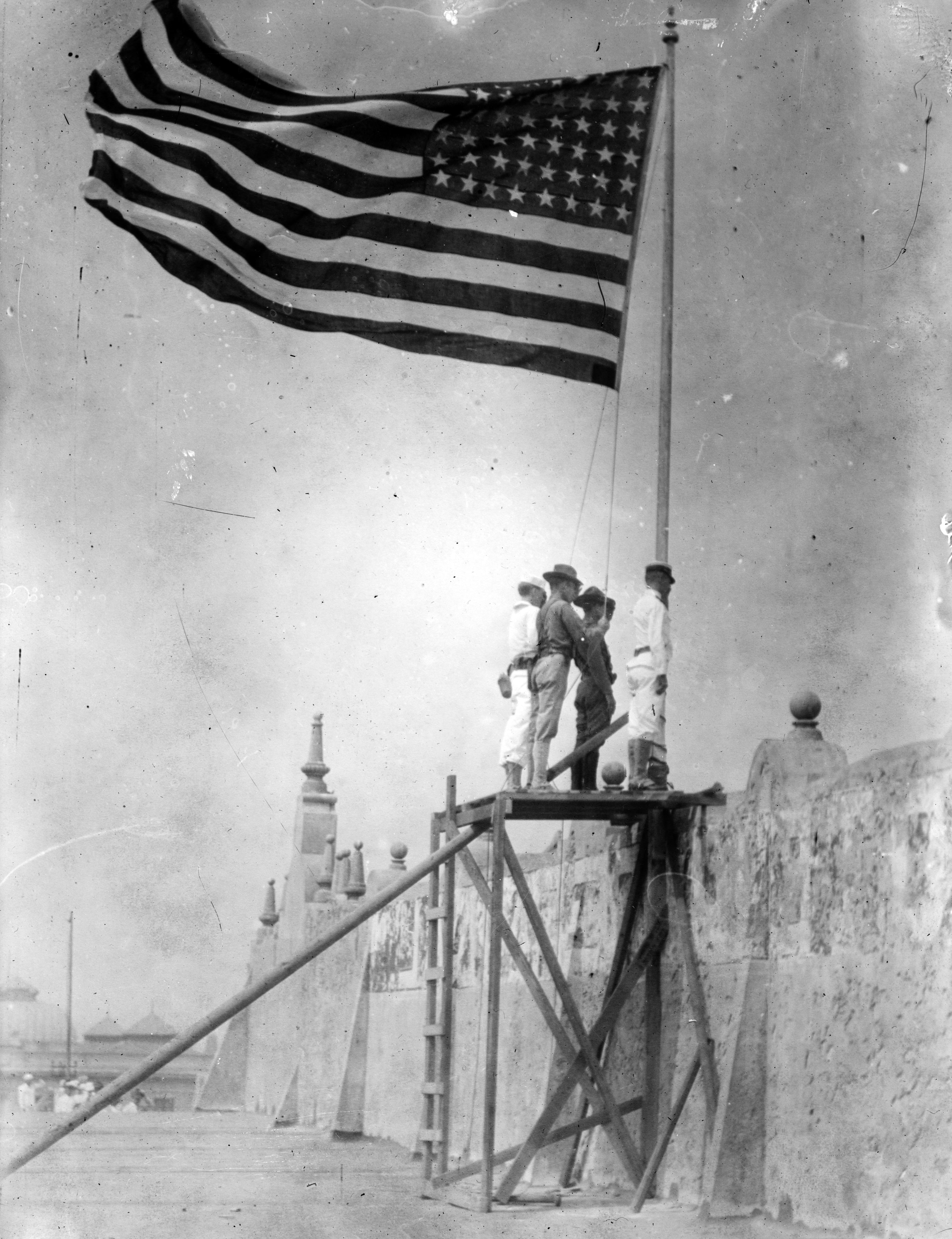
- Medal of Honor-recipient U.S. Marine John H. Quick raises the American flag over Veracruz
| Date | April 21, 1914 – November 23, 1914 (7 months and 2 days) |
| Location | Veracruz, Veracruz, Mexico |
| Result | American victory: Veracruz occupied by the United States; Military Government of Veracruz established; Mexican president Victoriano Huerta resigns; Venustiano Carranza becomes president |

Belligerents
| United States | Mexico |

Commanders and leaders
| Frank Fletcher; Frederick Funston | Gustavo Maass; Juan Esteban Morales |

Strength
| 7 battleships 2 light cruisers 1 auxiliary cruiser | |

Casualties and losses
| 21 killed 74 wounded 1 drowned | 152–172 killed 195–250 wounded |

The Battle of Veracruz was a military conflict between the United States and Mexico that took place in the Mexican port city of Veracruz between April 21 to November 23, 1914.

The incident occurred in the midst of tense diplomatic relations between Mexico and the United States related to the ongoing Mexican Revolution. It began with an occupation in response to the Tampico Affair of April 9, 1914, where Mexican forces had detained nine American sailors, further worsened relations, and led to widespread anti-Americanism in Mexico.

== Background ==
Mexico–United States relations had been strained by the Mexican–American War (1846–1848). The expansionist policies of US President James K. Polk, combined with the Mexican government's desire to retain control of Texas and Upper California, led to the outbreak of military conflict between the United States and Mexico in 1846. The decisive US victory led to Mexico ceding 55% of its territory to the United States and a sense of animosity developing between the two nations.

Relations improved during Abraham Lincoln's presidency. He provided military aid in the form of supplies for the Mexican government during their war against French occupation. Porfirio Díaz, head of state of Mexico from 1876 to 1911, took advantage of this improvement and encouraged US investment in order to shore up Mexico's stagnant economy. However, tensions re-emerged in 1911 after Diaz resigned, as Henry Lane Wilson, the US Ambassador to Mexico, worked to overthrow his successor, Francisco I. Madero, and replace him with General Victoriano Huerta, whom Ambassador Wilson viewed as better for American interests. The resulting coup d'état took place in February 1913 and was known as La Decena Tragica.

After becoming president in March 1913, Woodrow Wilson withdrew US recognition from the government of Victoriano Huerta and began encouraging the great powers to follow suit. The situation escalated more when Wilson imposed an arms embargo on Mexico in August 1913. A couple of months later, in October 1913, rebellions in the states of Chihuahua and Morelos led by Pancho Villa and Emiliano Zapata broke out after Huerta declared victory in a blatantly fraudulent election. The US subsequently supplied Villa with munitions in order to defeat Huerta.

The Tampico Affair itself was set off in 1914 when nine American sailors were arrested by the Mexican government for entering off-limit areas in Tampico, Tamaulipas. The unarmed sailors were arrested when they entered a fuel loading station. The sailors were released, but the US naval commander Henry T. Mayo demanded an apology and a 21-gun salute. The apology was provided, but not the salute. In the end, the tensions culminated in US President Woodrow Wilson ordering the US Navy to prepare for the occupation of the port of Veracruz. While awaiting authorization from the US Congress to carry out such action, Wilson was alerted to a delivery of weapons for General Victoriano Huerta due to arrive in the port on April 21 aboard the German-registered cargo steamer SS Ypiranga. As a result, Wilson issued an immediate order to seize the port's customs office and confiscate the weaponry. The weapons had actually been sourced by John Wesley De Kay, an American financier and businessman with large investments in Mexico, and a Russian arms dealer from Puebla, Leon Rasst, not the German government, as newspapers reported at the time.

Part of the arms shipment to Mexico originated from the Remington Arms company in the United States. The arms and ammunition were to be shipped to Mexico via Odesa and Hamburg to skirt the American arms embargo. In Hamburg, De Kay added to the shipment. The landing of the arms was blocked at Veracruz, but they were discharged a few weeks later in Puerto Mexico, a port controlled by Huerta at the time.

== Initial landing ==
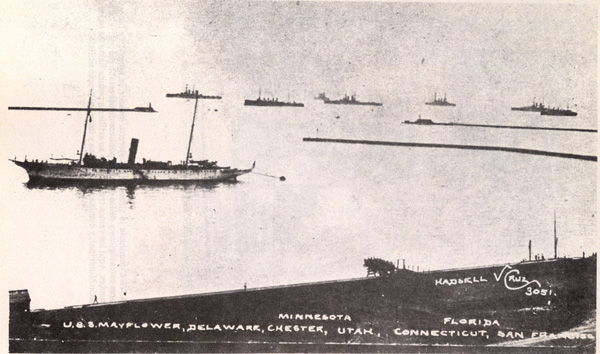
American ships at Veracruz, USS Mayflower in foreground

On the morning of April 21, 1914, warships of the United States Atlantic Fleet under the command of Rear Admiral Frank Friday Fletcher began preparations for the seizure of the Veracruz waterfront. Fletcher's orders were to "Seize custom house. Do not permit war supplies to be delivered to Huerta government or any other party." At 11:12 AM, consul William Canada watched from the roof of the American Consulate as the first boatload of Marines left the auxiliary vessel USS Prairie. Whaleboats carrying 502 Marines from the 2nd Advanced Base Regiment, 285 armed Navy sailors from the battleship USS Florida, and a provisional battalion composed of the Marine detachments from Florida and her sister ship USS Utah also began landing operations. As planned earlier, American consul William W. Canada notified General Gustavo Maass that Americans were occupying the port and warned him to "cooperate with the naval forces in maintaining order." Maass, however, was not permitted by Mexico City to surrender the port.

Maass ordered the Eighteenth Regiment, under the command of General Luis B. Becerril, to distribute rifles to the populace and to the prisoners in "La Galera" military prison, and then all to proceed to the dock area. Maass also ordered the Nineteenth Regiment, under the command of General Francisco A. Figueroa, to take up positions on Pier Number Four. Maass then radioed a dispatch to General Aurelio Blanquet, Minister of War in Mexico City, of the American invasion. Blanquet ordered Maass to not resist, but to retreat to Tejería, 10 kilometres (6 mi) inland. The landing party, under the command of William R. Rush reached Pier 4 at 11:20. A large crowd of Mexican and American citizens gathered to watch the spectacle. The American invaders, under the command of Marine Lt. Col. Wendell C. Neville, proceeded to their objectives without resistance. By 11:45, the rail terminal and cable station were occupied.

Commodore Manuel Azueta encouraged cadets of the Veracruz Naval Academy to take up the defense of the port for themselves.

== Battle of Veracruz ==
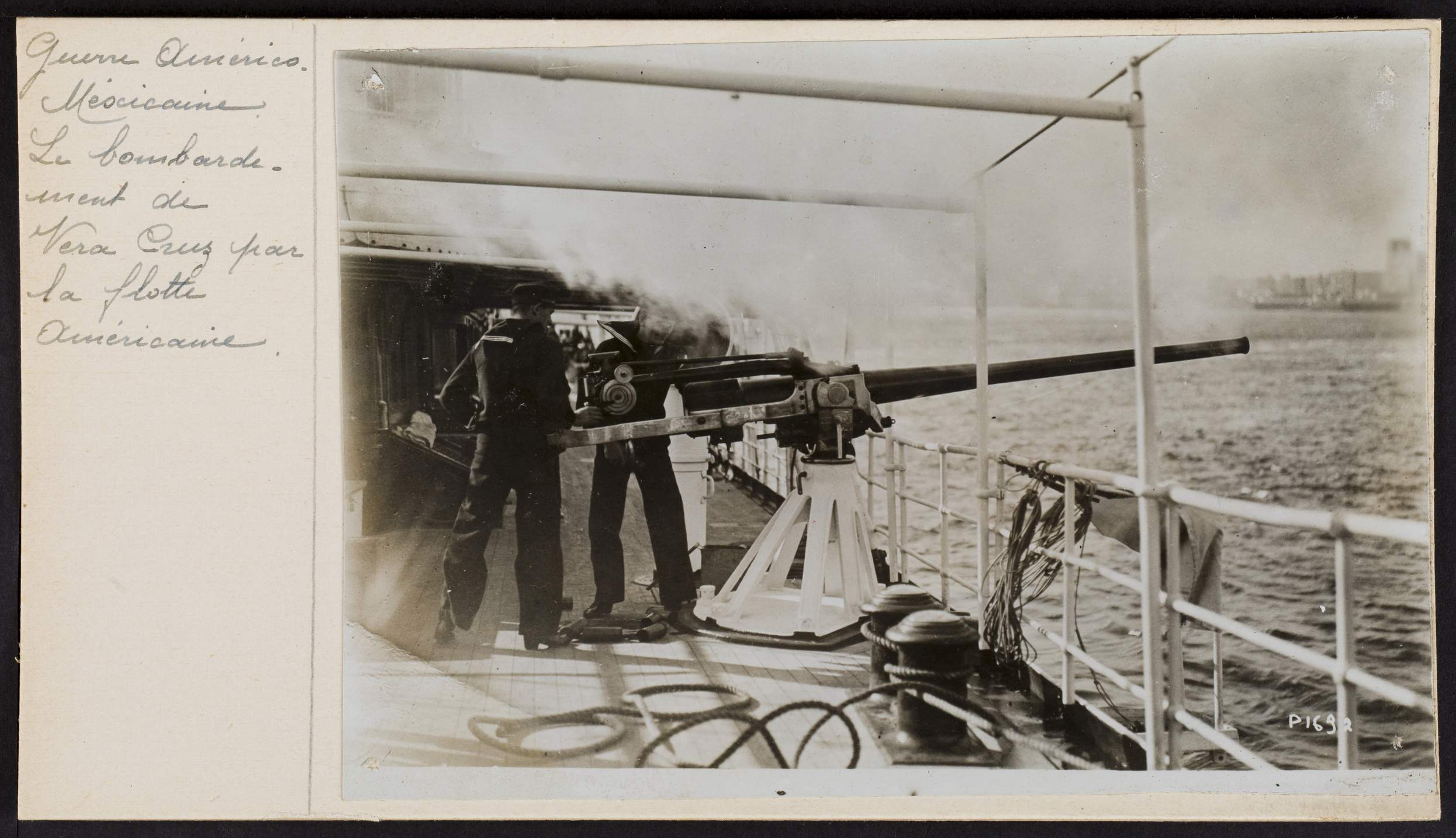
A 3″/50 gun bombarding Veracruz

Three Navy rifle companies were instructed to capture the customs house, post, and telegraph offices, while the Marines went for the railroad terminal, roundhouse, and yard, the cable office and the power plant.

Arms were distributed to the population, who were largely untrained in the use of bolt-action rifles like the German-made Mausers and had trouble finding the correct ammunition. In short, the defense of the city by its populace was hindered by the lack of central organization and a lack of adequate supplies. The defense of the city also included the release of the prisoners held at the "La Galera" military prison, not those at San Juan de Ulúa (some of whom were political prisoners), who were later attended to by the US Navy.

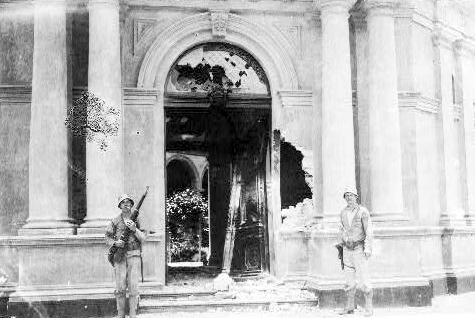
Damaged entrance to a high school adjacent to the Veracruz Naval Academy

Although most of the regular troops retreated with Maass to Tejería, the liberated prisoners under the command of Lt. Col. Manuel Contreras, and some civilians, opposed the Americans as they made their way to the custom house. At 11:57, the Mexicans fired upon the Americans as they reached the intersection of Independencia and Emparán. The navy signalman on top of the Hotel Terminal, Capt. Rush's headquarters, was the first American casualty, and by the end of the day, 4 Americans were dead and 20 wounded.

At 1:30 PM, the Ypiranga was intercepted, and detained, before it could off load its cargo of weapons and ammunition.

On the night of April 21, Fletcher decided that he had no choice but to expand the initial operation to include the entire city, not just the waterfront. At 8:00 AM the next day, he gave orders to take control of the entire city.

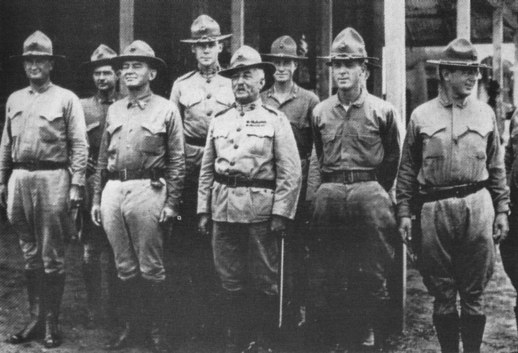
The senior officers of the 1st Marine Brigade photographed at Veracruz in 1914: Front row, left to right: Lt. Col. Wendell C. Neville; Col. John A. Lejeune; Col. Littleton W. T. Waller, Commanding; and Maj. Smedley Butler.

At 8:35 PM, Capt. C.T. Vogelsang's San Francisco entered the harbor next to the Prairie and off loaded a landing party. At 3 AM, Commander William A. Moffett's Chester offloaded 2 companies of marines and a company of seamen. These were followed by men from the Minnesota and Hancock of Admiral Charles J. Badger's Atlantic Fleet, bringing the total American men ashore to more than 3,000.

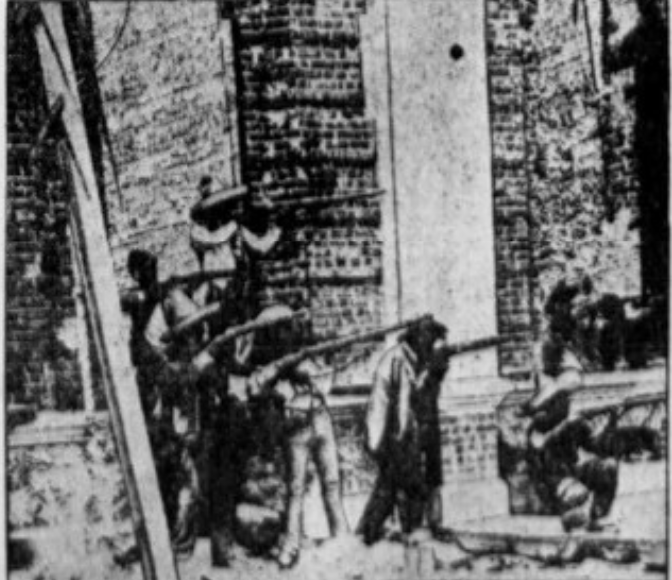
Mexican snipers in streets of Veracruz

At 07:45 April 22, the advance began. The leathernecks adapted to street fighting, which was a novelty to them. The sailors were less adept at this style of fighting. A regiment led by Navy Captain E. A. Anderson advanced on the Naval Academy in parade-ground formation, making his men easy targets for the partisans barricaded inside. The cadets previously occupying the building had left Veracruz the night before after suffering casualties. This attack was initially repulsed; soon, the attack was renewed, with artillery support from three warships in the harbor, Prairie, San Francisco, and Chester, that pounded the academy with their long guns for a few minutes, silencing all resistance.

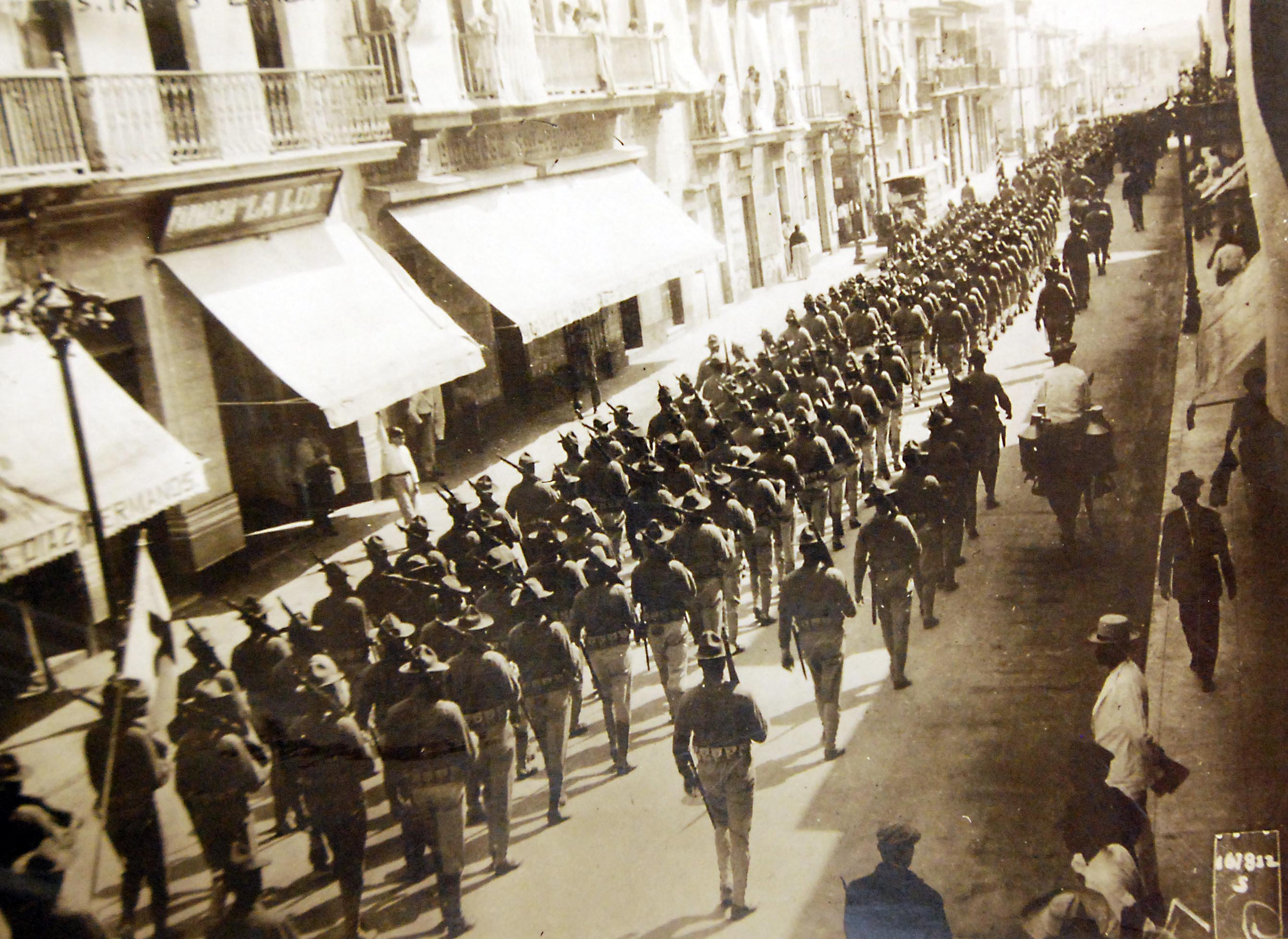
US troops enter Veracruz in April 1914

The city was secured by 11:00 AM, and by evening more than 6,000 troops were ashore.

That afternoon, the First Advanced Base Regiment, originally bound for Tampico, came ashore under the command of Colonel John A. Lejeune.

A small naval aviation detachment arrived aboard USS Mississippi on April 24 under the command of Henry C. Mustin. Two early aircraft assembled by Glenn Curtiss prior to formation of the Curtiss Aeroplane and Motor Company conducted aerial reconnaissance around Veracruz. This was the first operational use of naval aircraft and the first time US aviators of any service were the target of ground fire.

On April 26, Fletcher declared martial law, and started turning the occupation over to the American army under the command of General Frederick Funston. Nineteen American sailors and Marines were killed.

A third provisional regiment of Marines, assembled in Philadelphia, arrived on May 1 under the command of Colonel Littleton W. T. Waller, who assumed overall command of the brigade, by that time numbering some 3,141 officers and men. By then, the sailors and Marines of the Fleet had returned to their ships and an Army brigade had landed.

=== Resolution ===
Marines and soldiers continued to garrison the city until the US withdrawal on November 23, which occurred after Argentina, Brazil, and Chile became involved. Known as the ABC countries, they were the most powerful and wealthy countries in South America at the time. They were able to settle the issues between the two nations at the Niagara Falls peace conference.

== Political consequences ==
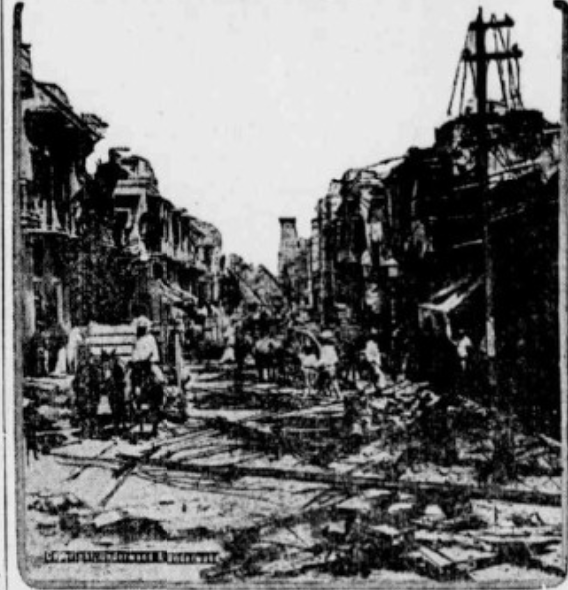
Veracruz after the bombardment

As an immediate reaction to the military invasion of Veracruz several anti-US riots broke out in Mexico, Argentina, Chile, Costa Rica, Ecuador, Guatemala, and Uruguay. US citizens were expelled from Mexican territory and some had to be accommodated in refugee campuses at New Orleans, Texas City, and San Diego. Even the British government was privately irritated, because they had previously agreed with Woodrow Wilson that the United States would not invade Mexico without prior warning. The military invasion of Veracruz was also a decisive factor in favor of keeping Mexico neutral in World War I. Mexico refused to participate with the United States in its military excursion in Europe and guaranteed German companies they could keep their operations open, especially in Mexico City. Nevertheless, the tension between the US and Mexico was great enough that the German government offered to help Mexico reconquer territory lost to the US in the Mexican American war in exchange for Mexican soldiers to help Germany in World War I. The Mexican government refused this offer.

US President Woodrow Wilson considered another military invasion of Veracruz and Tampico in 1917–1918, so as to take control of Tehuantepec Isthmus and Tampico oil fields, but this time the new Mexican President Venustiano Carranza gave the order to destroy the oil fields in case the Marines tried to land there.

== See also ==
- Foreign interventions by the United States
- Mexican Revolution
- Tampico Affair
- Theodore C. Lyster, US Army's Chief Health Officer in the conflict
- United States involvement in the Mexican Revolution
- Victoriano Huerta
- List of United States invasions of Latin American countries

== Bibliography ==
- Botte, M. Louis. Magazine L'Illustration, artícle "Les Américains au Mexique", 13 Juin 1914. (See Wikisource)
- Eisenhower, John S.D. (1993), Intervention! The United States and the Mexican Revolution, 1913–1917, New York: W. W. Norton & Company
- O'Shaughnessy, Edith, (1916), A Diplomat's Wife in Mexico, Harper & Brothers Publishers
- Quirk, Robert E. (1967). An Affair of Honor: Woodrow Wilson and the Occupation of Veracruz, W. W. Norton & Company.
- Sweetman, Jack (1968). The Landing at Veracruz: 1914. Annapolis, Maryland: Naval Institute Press.
