= March across Samar =

1901 failed US marine mission

Major Littleton W. T. Waller's March across the Island of Samar was an attempt by U.S. Marine forces to bisect the Philippine island during the Philippine–American War, purportedly for the purpose of finding a suitable telegraph cable route in 1901. Named for the Commanding Officer of the ill-fated patrol, Major Waller, the expedition proved disastrous due to exceedingly harsh conditions and a mutiny of many of the natives which had been brought along as porters. Ten Marines died during the attempt.

== Background ==
For a period of some two years following the cessation of hostilities with Spain, some of the wild pagan tribes of the Philippines (about five per cent of the total population of about seven million) kept the armed forces of the United States busy maintaining order. Although there had been practically no demonstrations by organized insurgents, the United States Marines in the district of Subig and Olongapo, Luzon Islands, did good work in ridding the area of various roving bands of ladrones.

The island of Samar had for some time been a veritable hotbed of insurrection. On September 28, 1901, the soldiers of Company C, Ninth Infantry, stationed at Balangiga, were surprised and cut to pieces by the insurrectos while many were in the mess hall eating breakfast. It was this tragedy, known forever after as the Balangiga Massacre, that caused Brigadier General Jacob H. Smith, U.S.A., who was in command of the military district which included the island of Samar, to call for reinforcements, which brought the U. S. Marines into action on Samar.

== Arrival of the Marines ==
On October 20, 1901, a battalion of Marines, consisting of Major Littleton W. T. Waller (commanding), Captains David Dixon Porter (USMC), Robert H. Dunlap, A. J. Matthews and Hirim I. Bearss, First Lieutenants J. T. Bootes, H. J. A. Day, C. C. Carpenter, A. S. Williams and Harry R. Lay, Second Lieutenants J. P. V. Gridley, Frank Halford and M. C. Rogers, Surgeon G. A. Lung, Assistant Surgeon J. M. Brister, and 300 enlisted men, was detailed at Cavite (Luzon, P.I.) for duty on the island of Samar, the easternmost of the Visayan group, by Rear Admiral Frederick Rodgers, U.S. Navy, senior squadron commander of the Asiatic station. Although the Marines were placed under the command of Brigadier General Smith, to reinforce and cooperate with the U. S. Army troops on Samar, it was also contemplated that Major Waller's movements should be supported, as far as possible, by a vessel of the fleet, to which he should make reports from time to time, and through which supplies for his battalion were to be furnished.

The battalion, composed of Companies C, D and H, First Regiment, and Company F, Second Regiment, equipped in heavy marching order, embarked on the armored cruiser USS New York (ACR-2) at Cavite, October 22, 1901. The battalion arrived at Catbalogan, Samar, on October 24, and the men and supplies were transferred to the U.S.S. ZAFIRO. Preceded by the U.S.S. FROLIC, carrying Rear Admiral Rodgers and staff and Brigadier General Smith and his aides, the ZAFIRO proceeded through the straits between Samar and Leyte to Tacloban, Leyte, and then to Basey, Samar, where Major Waller disembarked his headquarters and two companies and relieved some units of the Ninth Infantry. The remainder of the battalion took aboard a 3-inch gun and a Colt automatic 6-millimeter gun and proceeded to Balangiga, on the south coast of Samar, where Captain David D. Porter was left in command with 159 men, relieving the 17th U. S. Infantry, with instructions to begin operations as soon as possible. Major Waller then returned to Basey.

== Marine operations on Samar ==
The area assigned to the marines embraced the entire southern part of Samar. Active operations were immediately begun, both at Basey and Balangiga; small expeditions were sent out almost daily to clear the country of General Vicente Lukbam's guerrillas, who usually operated in small, roving bands. The situation in the vicinity was very tense because of the Balangiga massacre and other recent happenings; hence the measures prescribed for crushing the insurrection were somewhat retaliatory. On November 5, Major Waller took a detachment to the Sohoton River and drove the guerrillas from their trenches there; two marines were killed. A number of small expeditions were sent up the Cadacan River; several of these parties were fired on, but the skirmishes were slight. In an engagement, November 8, at Iba, several insurgents were killed and captured. An expedition under Captain Porter, sent out to scout in the vicinity of Balangiga, killed one insurgent and captured seven, and found many relics of the massacred men of the Ninth Infantry.

As a result of the continual harassing by the marines along the southern coast of Samar, the insurgents fell back from that region and occupied their fortified defenses on the Sohoton cliffs, along the Sohoton River. About the middle of November three columns of marines were sent into the Sohoton region to attack this stronghold, which had been reported to be practically impregnable. Two of the columns, under the command of Captains Porter and Bearss, marched on shore, while the third column, commanded by Major Waller, went up the river in boats. The plan of attack was for the three columns to unit on November 16 at the enemy's stronghold and make a combined assault.

On November 17, the shore column struck the enemy's trail and soon came upon a number of bamboo guns. One of these guns, emplaced to command the trail, had the fuse burning. Acting corporal Harry Glenn rushed forward and pulled out the fuse. The attack of the marines was a complete surprise, and the enemy was routed. After driving the insurgents from their positions the marines crossed the river and assaulted the cliff defenses. In order to reach the enemy's position, the marines had to climb the cliffs, which rose sheer from the river to the height of about 200 feet and were honeycombed with caves, to which access was had by means of bamboo ladders, and also by narrow ledges with bamboo hand rails. Tons of rocks were suspended in cages held in position by vine cables (known as bejuco), in readiness to be precipitated upon people and boats below. The guerillas were unable to spring their trap, however, because of heavy covering fire provided by Medal of Honor recipient Gunnery Sergeant John H. Quick on the Colt machine gun. The Marines scaled the 200 foot cliffs and with their Krag-Jorgensen rifles and .45 Caliber pistols, drove the insurgents from their positions and destroyed their camps. Major Waller's detachment, coming up the river in boats, did not arrive in time for the attack, which fact probably saved it from disaster; instant destruction would have undoubtedly been the fate of the boats had they undertaken the ascent of the river before the shore column had dislodged the insurgents.

Further pursuit of the enemy at this time was abandoned because the rations were exhausted and the men were in bad shape. The volcanic stone had cut the men's shoes to pieces, many of them were barefooted, and all had bad feet. The men had overcome incredible difficulties and dangers in their heroic march. The positions which they had destroyed must have taken several years to prepare. Reports from old prisoners said they had been there years working on the defenses. No white troops had ever penetrated to these positions, and they were held as a final rallying point. The insurrectos of Samar had spent years of labor on the defenses, and considered the cliff fortifications impregnable. No Marines were killed in the attack, which resulted in the deaths of around thirty insurgents. Two of the Marine Officers involved in the action, Captains Porter and Bearss, would both later receive the Medal of Honor for their conduct.

== The march begins ==
In a communication dated December 5, 1901, Major Waller refers to General Smith's desire that the marines make the march from Basey across the island of Samar to Hernani, for the purpose of selecting a route for a telegraph wire to connect the east and west coasts. General Smith also asked Major Waller to run wires from Basey to Balangiga, and left to the major's discretion the point of departure from the east coast, either from Hernani or Lanang.

On December 8, two columns left Basey for Balangiga, one, under command of Major Waller, proceeding along the shore line, and the other, under Captain Bearss, marching about two miles inland. Stores were sent by the cutter which was kept abreast of the beach column. Although the marines did not encounter any organized resistance, the obstacles of nature which they encountered proved far more deadly than the natives and their many contrivances. Major Waller decided to start his ill-fated march across Samar from Lanang, work up the Lanang River as far as possible, then march to the vicinity of the Sohoton cliffs, which his marines had recently captured.

On arriving at Lanang, Major Waller was urged not to make the attempt, however, he says in his report: "Remembering the general's (General Smith's) several talks on the subject and his evident desire to know the terrain and run wires across, coupled with my own desire for some further knowledge of the people and the nature of this heretofore impenetrable country, I decided to make the trial with 50 men and the necessary carriers."

The detachment started from Lanang on the morning of December 28, 1901, and was composed of the following personnel: Major Littleton W. T. Waller, Captain David D. Porter, Captain Hirim I. Bearss, First Lieutenant A. S. Williams, Second Lieutenant A. C. DeW. Lyles, U. S. Army (Aid sent by General Smith), Second Lieutenant Frank Halford, 50 enlisted U. S. Marines, 2 native scouts and 33 native carriers. The start was made in boats but when Lagitao was reached, it was found impossible to use them further on account of the numerous rapids; the remainder of the distance was made on foot. One of the most trying features of the march was the necessity for crossing and recrossing the swollen river many times, which kept the men's clothing wet continually. On December 30, it was necessary to issue reduced rations, and the next day the rations had to be cut down to one-half and the number of meals per day to two. The march was continued across the rugged mountains on January 1 and 2. On January 3, the rapidly vanishing food supply and the serious condition of the troops made the situation very critical. The men were becoming ill, their clothing were in rags, their feet were swollen and bleeding, and the trail was lost. After a conference with his officers, Major Waller decided to take Lieutenant Halford and thirteen of the men who were in the best condition and push forward as rapidly as possible and send back a relief party for the main column, which was placed under the command of Captain Porter with instructions to go slowly and follow Major Waller's trail. The advance column was afterwards joined by Captain Bearss and a corporal, the former carrying a message from Captain Porter. A message was sent back to Captain Porter, directing him to follow the advanced column to a clearing which had been found where there was a quantity of sweet potatoes, bananas and young coconut palms, and to rest there until his men were in condition to continue the march. This message did not reach Porter, however, as the native by whom it was sent returned two days later, stating that there were so many insurrectos about that he was afraid.

On January 4, Major Waller's party rushed a shack and captured five natives, among whom were a man and a boy who stated that they knew the way to Basey. After crossing the Sohoton River, the famous Spanish trail leading from the Sohoton caves to the Suribao River was discovered and followed. The party crossed the Loog River and proceeded through the valley to Banglay, on the Cadacan River. Near this point the party came upon the camp which Captain Dunlap had established to await their arrival. Major Waller's party went aboard Captain Dunlap's cutter and started for Basey, where they arrived on January 6, 1902.

Concerning the condition of the men of his party, Major Waller says: " The men, realizing that all was over and that they were safe and once more near home, gave up. Some quietly wept; others laughed hysterically....Most of them had no shoes. Cut, torn, bruised and dilapidated, they had marched without murmur for twenty-nine days."

Immediately after the arrival of the detachment at Basey, a relief party was sent back to locate Captain Porter's party. The following day Major Waller joined this relief party, and remained out nine days searching for signs of Captain Porter without success. The floods were terrific and several of the former camp sites were many feet under water. The members of the relief party began to break down, due to the many hardships and the lack of food, and the party had to return to Basey. Upon returning to Basey, Major Waller was taken sick with fever.

Meanwhile Captain Porter had decided to retrace the trail to Lanang and ask for a relief party to be sent out for his men, the most of whom were unable to march. He chose seven marines who were in the best condition and with six natives, set out January 3 for Lanang. He left Lieutenant Williams in charge of the remainder of the detachment with orders to follow as the condition of the men would permit. Lieutenant Porter's return to Lanang was made under difficulties many times greater than those encountered during the march to the interior. Food was almost totally lacking, and heavy rains filled the streams making it almost impossible to follow down their banks or cross them as was so often necessary. On January 11, Captain Porter reached Lanang and reported the situation to Captain Pickering, the Army Commander at that place. A relief expedition was organized to go for the remainder of the marines but it was unable to start for several days because of the swollen Lanang River. Without food, yet realizing that starvation was certain if they remained in camp, Lieutenant Williams and his men slowly followed Captain Porter's trail, leaving men behind one by one to die beside the trail when it was no longer possible for them to continue. One man went insane; the native carriers became mutinous and some of them attacked and wounded Lieutenant Williams with bolos. Williams later testified that their mutinous behavior left the Marines in daily fear of their lives; the porters were hiding food and supplies from the Marines and keeping themselves nourished from the jungle while the Marines starved. The 11 porters were placed under arrest when Williams' command reached Lanang.

After an investigation, Waller ordered the summary execution, without trial, of the eleven Filipino porters for treason, theft, disobedience and general mutiny. Ten were shot in groups of three (one had been gunned down in the water attempting to escape) The bodies were left in the square, as an example, until one evening, under cover of darkness, some townspeople carried them off for a Christian burial.

Waller later reported the executions to General Smith, as he had reported every other event. "It became necessary to expend eleven prisoners. Ten who were implicated in the attack on Lt. Williams and one who plotted against me." After having left ten marines to die along the trail, Lieutenant Williams was finally met by the relief party on the morning of January 18 and taken back to Lanang.

Lieutenant Williams, who was left in charge of the weakest men of the expedition, had the most difficult task of the whole affair. The full circumstances of his attempt to extricate these men from the midst of the tropical jungle is one of the most tragic and heroic incident in Marine Corps history. The entire march across Samar was about 190 miles. Major Waller's march, including his return with the party searching for Captain Porter, was about 250 miles.

Waller's Marine Battalion on Samar was relieved by U.S. Army units on 26 February 1902. He and his Battalion left Samar on 29 February, returning to Cavite on 2 March 1902.

For many years, thereafter, officers and men of the United States Marine Corps paid a traditional tribute to the indomitable courage of these marines by rising in their presence with the following words of homage: "STAND, GENTLEMEN, HE SERVED ON SAMAR!"

== Aftermath ==
Smith passed Waller's report to General Adna Chaffee. For some reason, Chaffee decided to investigate these executions, despite General J. Franklin Bell and Colonel Jacob H. Smith having carried out similar executions on a much larger scale months before with no subsequent investigations.

Waller was tried for murder in ordering the execution of the eleven Filipino porters. A court martial began on March 17, 1902.[3] The court-martial board consisted of 7 Army officers and 6 Marine Corps officers, led by U.S. Army General William H. Bisbee.

Major Henry P. Kingsbury, USA, the prosecutor, read the charge and specification.

CHARGE: Murder, in violation of the 58th Article of War. SPECIFICATION: In that Major Littleton W.T. Waller, United States Marine Corps, being then and there detached for service with the United States Army by authority of the President of the United States, did, in time of war, willfully and feloniously and with malice aforethought, murder and kill eleven men, names unknown, natives of the Philippine Islands, by ordering and causing his subordinate officer under his command, John Horace Arthur Day, 1st Lieutenant, U.S. Marine Corps, and a firing detail of enlisted men under his said command, to take out said eleven men and shoot them to death, which said order was then and there carried into execution and said eleven natives, and each of them, were shot with rifles, from the effects of which they then and there died. This at Basey, Island of Samar, Philippine Islands, on or about the 20th day of January, 1902. Waller's attorney, Cdr Adolf Marix USN, first argued, unsuccessfully, that the Army had no jurisdiction over him as he was still under Marine Corps command. From the court martial transcript:

“ "The specification does not allege that Major Waller is now detached for service with the United States Army, nor does it allege that due process against him for the offence was instituted before he was detached from the Army. The charge does not, therefore, represent a case within the jurisdiction of the Army court martial." In other words, Marix said, the Army did not charge Waller when he was assigned to them, and he is not assigned to them any longer.

"The charges brought against Major Waller were handed to him on March 4th, and constitute the first process against him. This was several days after he was detached from the Army ... the jurisdiction was therefore voluntarily surrendered."

"The plea is that the defendant is not subject to the jurisdiction of this court", General Bisbee noted.

"We want to know whether there is any possible written or other evidence from the President of the United States placing him on detached duty with the Army, and thereby placing him within the province of this court."

"I can have them here tomorrow morning", the prosecutor responded, and next day he submitted in evidence a series of telegrams between Admiral Rogers and General Chaffee in which the offer of three hundred Marines for service with the Sixth Brigade is made and accepted. "The Marines were serving in Samar by order of the President. The Secretary of War and the Secretary of the Navy knew they were there." Besides, Major R. N. Getty had been assigned to investigate the shootings at Basey, and had so advised Waller before the Marine battalion was detached from Sixth Brigade on 19 February."

Not sufficient, Marix responded. "Legal proceedings are defined clearly ... the accused has a right to be present, the witnesses sworn, and be represented by counsel. Nothing of the kind happened in this case. An inspector is not a judicial officer."

General Bisbee decided that the court was without jurisdiction in the case, but left open the possibility of reversing himself if instructions were received from the office of the Adjutant General of the Army.

On 21 March, the instructions arrived. The Assistant Adjutant General noted that General Mac Arthur, Military Governor of the Philippines, had ordered a preliminary examination of the case, with a view to legal action, before Waller was relieved of duty with the Army. Waller assisted in Major Getty’s investigation, and was questioned by him, so he had to know that he was a party to the proceedings. Besides, a “brief lapse of jurisdiction” cannot mitigate a murder charge.

General Bisbee “now decides that (the court) has jurisdiction and directs that the case proceed to trial.” Waller carefully entered his plea:

To the specification - Guilty, except to the words “willfully and feloniously and with malice aforethought, murder and” - to those words, not guilty. To the charge - Not Guilty

Waller did not use Smith's orders "I want all persons killed" to justify his deed, instead relying on the rules of war and provisions of a Civil War General Order Number 100 that authorized "exceeding force", much as J. Franklin Bell had successfully done months before. Waller's counsel had rested his defense.

The prosecution then decided to call General Smith as a rebuttal witness. On April 7, 1902, in sworn testimony, Smith denied that he had given any special verbal orders to Waller. Waller then produced three officers who corroborated Waller's version of the Smith-Waller conversation, and copies of every written order he had received from Smith, Waller informed the court he had been directed to take no prisoners and to kill every male Filipino over age 10.[4]

During the trial, American newspapers, including his hometown newspaper in Philadelphia, nicknamed Waller the "Butcher of Samar".[5]

The court martial board voted 11-2 for acquittal of Waller. Later, the U.S. Army Judge Advocate General dismissed the entire case, agreeing that a Marine Corps officer was not subject to an Army court.

As as result of evidence introduced at the Waller trail, General Smith was then court martialed, convicted, admonished, and forced to retire
