= John H. Quick =

United States Marine (1870–1922)

John Henry Quick
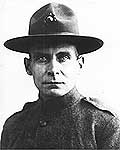
- Born: June 20, 1870; Charles Town, West Virginia, US
- Died: September 9, 1922 (aged 52); St. Louis, Missouri, US
- Burial place: Memorial Park Cemetery, Jennings, Missouri
- Military career
- Allegiance: United States
- Branch: United States Marine Corps
- Service years: 1892–1918, 1920
- Rank: Sergeant Major
- Unit: 6th Marine Regiment
- Conflicts: Spanish–American War: Battle of Guantánamo Bay; Philippine–American War; Battle of Vera Cruz; World War I: Battle of Belleau Wood; Battle of Soissons
- Awards: Medal of Honor; Distinguished Service Cross; Navy Cross; Silver Star Medal

John Henry Quick (June 20, 1870 – September 9, 1922) was a United States Marine who received the Medal of Honor for his actions at Guantanamo Bay, Cuba in 1898 during the Spanish–American War and the Distinguished Service Cross and the Navy Cross during World War I.

== Early years ==
Quick was born June 20, 1870, in Charles Town, Jefferson County, West Virginia.

== Military service ==
He enlisted in the United States Marine Corps on August 10, 1892, from Philadelphia, Pennsylvania. He received the Medal of Honor "for gallantry in action" in signalling the gunfire support vessel Dolphin while exposed to heavy enemy fire at Guantanamo Bay, Cuba on June 14, 1898.

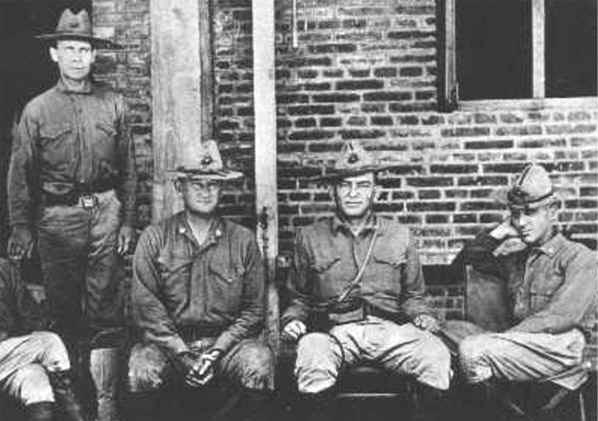
Gunnery Sergeant John H. Quick (far left) photographed sometime prior to 1912 with three other legendary Marines. From left to right: future Major General and Marine Corps Commandant Wendell Cushing Neville, future Lieutenant General and Commandant John Archer Lejeune, and future Major General and two time Medal of Honor recipient Smedley Butler

Throughout his 26-year career as a Marine, Quick participated in every campaign the Marines were involved in during his enlistment and he was the holder of several awards for valor. The campaigns he participated in include The West Indies Campaign, The Spanish–American War, the Philippine–American War, Cuban Campaign, Battle of Vera Cruz (1914) and, World War I.

=== Spanish–American War ===
During the morning of June 14, 1898, Companies "C" and "D" of Lt. Col Robert W. Huntington's Marine Battalion and approximately fifty Cubans moved through the hills to seize Cuzco Well, the main water supply for the Spanish garrison at Guantanamo Bay, Cuba. The USS Dolphin (PG-24) moved east along the shore ready to furnish naval gunfire support upon call. The Spanish soon discovered the movement and their main body near the Well was alerted. The Marines and Cubans occupied the hill which overlooked the enemy's position, but were immediately subjected to heavy long-range rifle fire. Captain George F. Elliott (later Commandant of the Marine Corps), who had succeeded to command of the Marine Detachment, signaled the Dolphin to shell the Spanish position; but because the sender was not clearly visible, the message was misinterpreted, and the vessel began dropping shells on a small detachment of Marines who were en route to join the fight. The problem of directing the fire of the USS Dolphin was solved by Sergeant Quick who heroically placed himself in plain sight of the vessel, but in danger of falling shells as well as a brisk enemy fire, and signaled for the bombardment to be stopped. War correspondent and author Stephen Crane, who was with the Marines there, later described the scene in his war tale "Marines Signaling Under Fire at Guantanamo":

Sergeant Quick arose, and announced that he was a signalman. He produced from somewhere a blue polka-dot neckerchief as large as a quilt. He tied it on a long, crooked stick. Then he went to the top of the ridge, and turning his back to the Spanish fire, began to signal to the Dolphin. Again we gave a man sole possession of a particular part of the ridge. We didn't want it. He could have it and welcome. If the young sergeant had had the smallpox, the cholera, and the yellow fever, we could not have slid out with more celerity.

As men have said often, it seemed as if there was in this war a God of Battles who held His mighty hand before the Americans. As I looked at Sergeant Quick wig-wagging there against the sky, I would not have given a tin tobacco-tag for his life. Escape for him seemed impossible. It seemed absurd to hope that he would not be hit; I only hoped that he would be hit just a little, in the arm, the shoulder, or the leg.

I watched his face, and it was as grave and serene as that of a man writing in his own library. He was the very embodiment of tranquility in occupation. He stood there amid the animal-like babble of the Cubans, the crack of rifles, and the whistling snarl of the bullets, and wig-wagged whatever he had to wig-wag without heeding anything but his business. There was not a single trace of nervousness or haste.

To say the least, a fight at close range is absorbing as a spectacle. No man wants to take his eyes from it until that time comes when he makes up his mind to run away. To deliberately stand up and turn your back to a battle is in itself hard work. To deliberately stand up and turn your back to a battle and hear immediate evidences of the boundless enthusiasm with which a large company of the enemy shoot at you from an adjacent thicket is, to my mind at least, a very great feat. One need not dwell upon the detail of keeping the mind carefully upon a slow spelling of an important code message.

I saw Quick betray only one sign of emotion. As he swung his clumsy flag to and fro, an end of it once caught on a cactus pillar, and he looked sharply over his shoulder to see what had it. He gave the flag an impatient jerk. He looked annoyed.

When Sergeant Quick finished this message, the ship answered. Quick then picked up his M1895 Lee Navy rifle and resumed his place on the firing line. The Dolphin shifted her fire and by 2:00 p.m. the Spaniards had begun to retreat. For his gallant and selfless conduct during this action, Quick received the Medal of Honor.

=== Philippine–American War ===
During the Philippine–American War, he served as a Gunnery Sergeant in the Samaran campaign from October 26, 1901, to March 26, 1902. He participated in a battle at the Sohoton Cliffs, where he played a decisive role laying down covering fire for the advancing Marines with an M1895 Colt–Browning machine gun, and in Waller's March across Samar under the command of Major Littleton W. T. Waller.

=== Veracruz ===
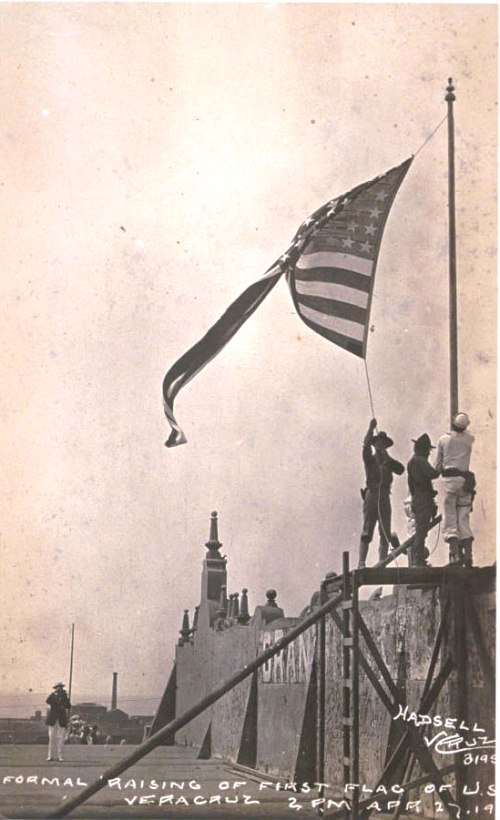
Quick raises the U.S. flag over Veracruz.

Quick served on expeditionary duty in Mexico (April 21, 1914 – November 23, 1914).

During the Veracruz Campaign of 1914, Quick was again cited for valor during the assault of that city, for which the Secretary of the Navy commendation says of his performance:

He was continually exposed to fire during the first two days of the operation and showed coolness, bravery, and judgment in the prompt manner in which he performed his duties.

=== World War I ===
Quick sailed to France as one of the Battalion Sergeants Major of the 6th Marine Regiment in 1917.

The Battle of Belleau Wood was the opening battle of the War for him and he was awarded the Distinguished Service Cross and the Navy Cross for assisting in the delivery of ammunition, over a road swept by enemy artillery and machine gun fire, to Boureches.

He earned these decorations on June 6, 1918, when "he volunteered and assisted in taking a truckload of ammunition and material into Bouresches, France, over a road swept by artillery and machine-gun fire, thereby relieving a critical situation." He was further awarded the 2d Division Citation, and his regiment was awarded the French fourragère of the croix de guerre.

In addition to Belleau Wood he participated in every battle that was fought by the Marines in France until October 16, 1918, including the Toulon Sector at Verdun, the Aisne-Marne Offensive (popularly known as the Battle of Soissons), the Marbache Sector near Pont-a-Mousoon, the St. Mihiel Offensive, the Battle of Blanc Mont Ridge, and the Meuse-Argonne Offensive Sector.

== Retirement and death ==
He retired November 20, 1918 and after requesting to come back, was recalled from July 26, 1920 – September 15, 1920.

He died in St. Louis, Missouri on September 9, 1922, at the age of 52 and is buried in Memorial Park Cemetery in Jennings, Missouri.

== Honors and awards ==
=== Military decorations ===
- Medal of Honor
- Distinguished Service Cross
- Navy Cross
- Silver Star Medal (Citation Star)

=== Medal of Honor citation ===
Rank and organization: Sergeant, U.S. Marine Corps. Born: June 20, 1870, Charleston, W. Virginia Accredited to: Pennsylvania. G.O. No. 5: December 4, 13, 1898. Other Navy award: Navy Cross.

Citation:

In action during the battle of Cuzco, Cuba, 14 June 1898. Distinguishing himself during this action, Quick signaled the U.S.S. Dolphin on 3 different occasions while exposed to a heavy fire from the enemy.

=== Navy Cross citation ===
Citation:

The President of the United States of America takes pleasure in presenting the Navy Cross to Sergeant Major John Henry Quick (MCSN: 68644), United States Marine Corps, for extraordinary heroism while serving with the Headquarters Company, 6th Regiment (Marines), 2d Division, A.E.F. in action at Bouresches, France, 6 June 1918. Sergeant Major Quick volunteered and assisted in taking a truck load of ammunition and material into Bouresches, France, over a road swept by artillery and machine-gun fire, thereby relieving a critical situation.

=== Distinguished Service Cross citation ===
Citation:

The President of the United States of America, authorized by Act of Congress, July 9, 1918, takes pleasure in presenting the Distinguished Service Cross to Sergeant Major John Henry Quick (MCSN: 68644), United States Marine Corps, for extraordinary heroism while serving with the Headquarters Company, Sixth Regiment (Marines), 2d Division, A.E.F., in action at Bouresches, France, 6 June 1918. Sergeant Major Quick volunteered and assisted in taking a truck load of ammunition and material into Bouresches, France, over a road swept by artillery and machine-gun fire, thereby relieving a critical situation.

=== Other honors ===
In addition to his military medals the United States Navy named a Gleaves-class destroyer USS Quick in his honor. The ship was completed and launched on May 3, 1942, and was sponsored by Quick's niece. The ship earned four battle stars for actions during World War II. The Liberty ship SS John H. Quick was also named after him. Quantico Marine base includes a John Quick Road in a residential area.

== See also ==
- List of Medal of Honor recipients for the Spanish–American War
