= Littleton Waller =

US Marine Corps major-general

Littleton Tazewell Waller
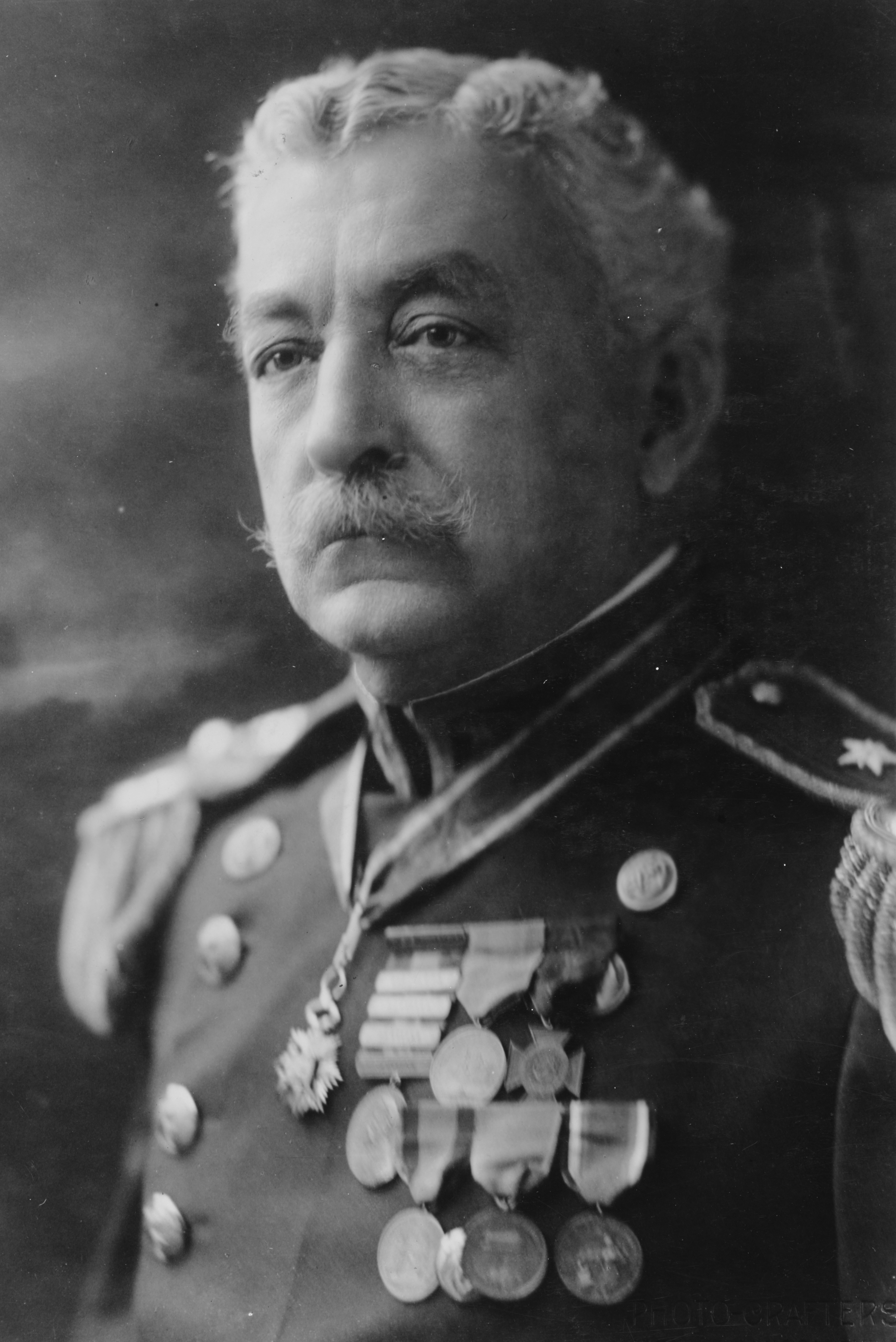
- Born: September 26, 1856; York County, Virginia, U.S.
- Died: July 13, 1926 (aged 69); Philadelphia, Pennsylvania, U.S.
- Burial place: Arlington National Cemetery
- Relatives: Littleton W. T. Waller Jr. (son); John B. W. Waller (son); Henry T. Waller (son)
- Military career
- Allegiance: United States of America
- Branch: United States Marine Corps
- Service years: 1880–1920
- Rank: Major General
- Nickname: "Tony"
- Conflicts: Anglo-Egyptian War (observer); Spanish–American War; Boxer Rebellion; Philippine–American War; Samar campaign; Banana Wars; Occupation of Veracruz; Haiti intervention; World War I
- Awards: Marine Corps Brevet Medal; Navy Specially Meritorious Service Medal

Littleton Tazewell "Tony" Waller (September 26, 1856 – July 13, 1926) was a career officer in the United States Marine Corps, who served in the Spanish–American War, the Caribbean, and Asia. He was court-martialed and acquitted for his actions during the Philippine–American War, when he led an ill-fated expedition across the island of Samar. Waller retired from the Marines holding the rank of major general.

== Early life and career ==
Littleton ("Tony") Waller was born in York County, Virginia, on 26 September 1856. He was appointed as a second lieutenant of Marines on 24 June 1880 at the age of 23 and served initial tours of successive shore duty at the Marine Barracks in Norfolk, Virginia, and Washington, D.C.

== Ancestors ==
Both of Waller's ancestral families enjoyed wealth and political distinction in England and America. The Wallers were high sheriffs of Kent, where the family owned Groombridge Place, and judiciaries in Buckinghamshire. Littleton Waller's ancestor Col. John Waller came to Virginia about 1635. He trained as an attorney at the College of William and Mary and founded a family that included several members of the Virginia House of Burgesses, a justice of the Virginia Supreme Court, and a member of Virginia's delegation to the committee that adopted the Declaration of Independence. Littleton Waller's ancestor Benjamin Waller was a noted colonial attorney of Williamsburg, Virginia.

The Tazewells of Dorset county were churchmen and scholars of the law. William Tazewell, attorney, born in 1691, emigrated to Virginia in 1715. His descendants include members of the House of Burgesses, the U.S. House of Representatives, the Senates of both Virginia and the United States, and the Virginia Supreme Court. Tony Waller's maternal grandfather Littleton Waller Tazewell was, in turn, a U.S. Congressman, a U.S. Senator, and Governor of Virginia. He built the family home, Wishing Oak, on Granby Street in Norfolk in 1802 and died there on May 6, 1860.

The general's mother, Mary Waller Tazewell, was born at Wishing Oak in 1822. In 1848, she married Matthew Page Waller, her third cousin four times removed. Their children included a daughter and two sons older than Tony, and three sons younger. Littleton Waller Tazewell Waller was born on September 26, 1856. His father, who was a doctor, died of typhoid during an epidemic on December 11, 1861. Mary remained a widow until her death on December 20, 1889. She is buried with her husband in Elmwood Cemetery in Norfolk, Virginia.

The family's extensive public service is exclusively civilian. In 1920, when Tony Waller Jr. joined the Sons of the American Revolution, his application was based on his ancestor's participation in the Committee of Independence. The Waller family website says little about the Civil War years, and the associated Tazewell website says even less.

The Wallers and Tazewells seem to have had no military members prior to Tony's commissioning. His decision to become an officer must have surprised his family, but they were supportive of his ambition. In his teens, Tony was a corporal in the Norfolk Light Artillery Blues, a local militia unit. Turned down for a commission in the cavalry (at 5' 4" he was too short), he was accepted into the Marines.

== Early years ==
Tony Waller was bright, but indifferent to education. He was an outdoorsman, fond of hunting, fishing and riding, and uncomfortable in the classroom. Historian David McCulloch noted that, in the nineteenth century, every literate person in the English-speaking world was familiar with three books – the King James Bible, the works of Shakespeare, and John Bunyan's Pilgrim's Progress. Waller's writing shows the influence of all three. His report from Peking compares the condition of the Marines to Falstaff's army, in reference to Shakespeare's Henry IV. He uses the Biblical phrase "the peace of God which passeth all understanding" in his letter to the Marines in France in 1918. In reporting the death in action of one of his officers in China, Waller expressed confidence that "all the trumpets will sound for him upon the other side", a phrase taken from Bunyan's description of the death of Faithful. In their ghostwritten memoirs Smedley Butler and Frederick C. Wise remember him as an eloquent speaker and fascinating storyteller. Yet he apparently never considered the study of law or a career in politics.

== Early Marine career ==
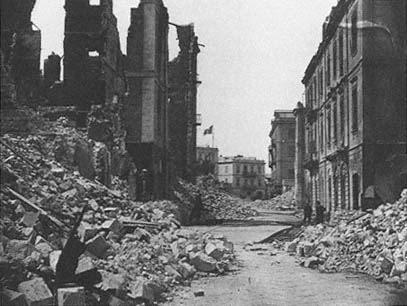
Photo of Alexandria, Egypt after the bombardment and fire of July 11–13, 1882

Waller first went to sea as the Executive Officer of the Marine Detachment aboard the sloop-of-war USS Lancaster, the flagship of the European Squadron and a veteran of the Civil War, in 1881. The Commanding Officer of the Detachment, also a veteran of the Civil War, was the legendary Captain Henry Clay Cochrane. The following year, Waller was present at the British Naval bombardment of Alexandria, Egypt during a serious local uprising in the summer of 1882. He participated in the landing of a mixed bluejacket and Marine force during the operation. The Naval landing force of sixty-nine sailors and sixty-three Marines was formed, with Lieutenant Commander Charles Goodrich in command and Captain Cochrane as executive officer. The force comprised two companies, the sailors under Navy Lieutenant Frank L. Denny and the Marines under Waller.

The timely arrival of the ships of the European Squadron and their landing force gave protection to the American consulate and to American citizens and interests caught up in the fighting, and also afforded a refuge for the citizens of other nations, who had been displaced from their homes or businesses. Advancing cautiously through the burning and rubble strewn streets, the Americans reached the Grand Square of Mehmet Ali, at the heart of the city. The American Consulate was there, and it became the headquarters of the force. Although the French troops had abandoned the city and cautiously returned to their ships, the Marines secured the Grand Square and began to patrol the streets of the European Quarter, as the international business and consular area was named. Cochrane, Waller and their Marines were assigned to Lord Charles Beresford's British force for the protection of the European Quarter. The anticipated rebel counterattack never came, and a ten-day standoff ended with the arrival of the four thousand-man British relief force. According to the Times of London:

Lord Charles Beresford states that without the assistance of the American Marines he would have been unable to discharge the numerous duties of suppressing fires, preventing looting, burying the dead, and clearing the streets.

As there was no wireless radio in those days, and the telegraphic cable office in Alexandria was not functioning, the Squadron Commander had approval to land the naval force, but once ashore Goodrich had been on his own. It was he who made the decision to stay with the British rather than leave with the French. Waller, as one of only four officers in the landing force, would have been present when the decisions were made. He learned, as a 24-year-old lieutenant, the habits of independence in command that he would exercise throughout his career.

== The Spanish–American War ==
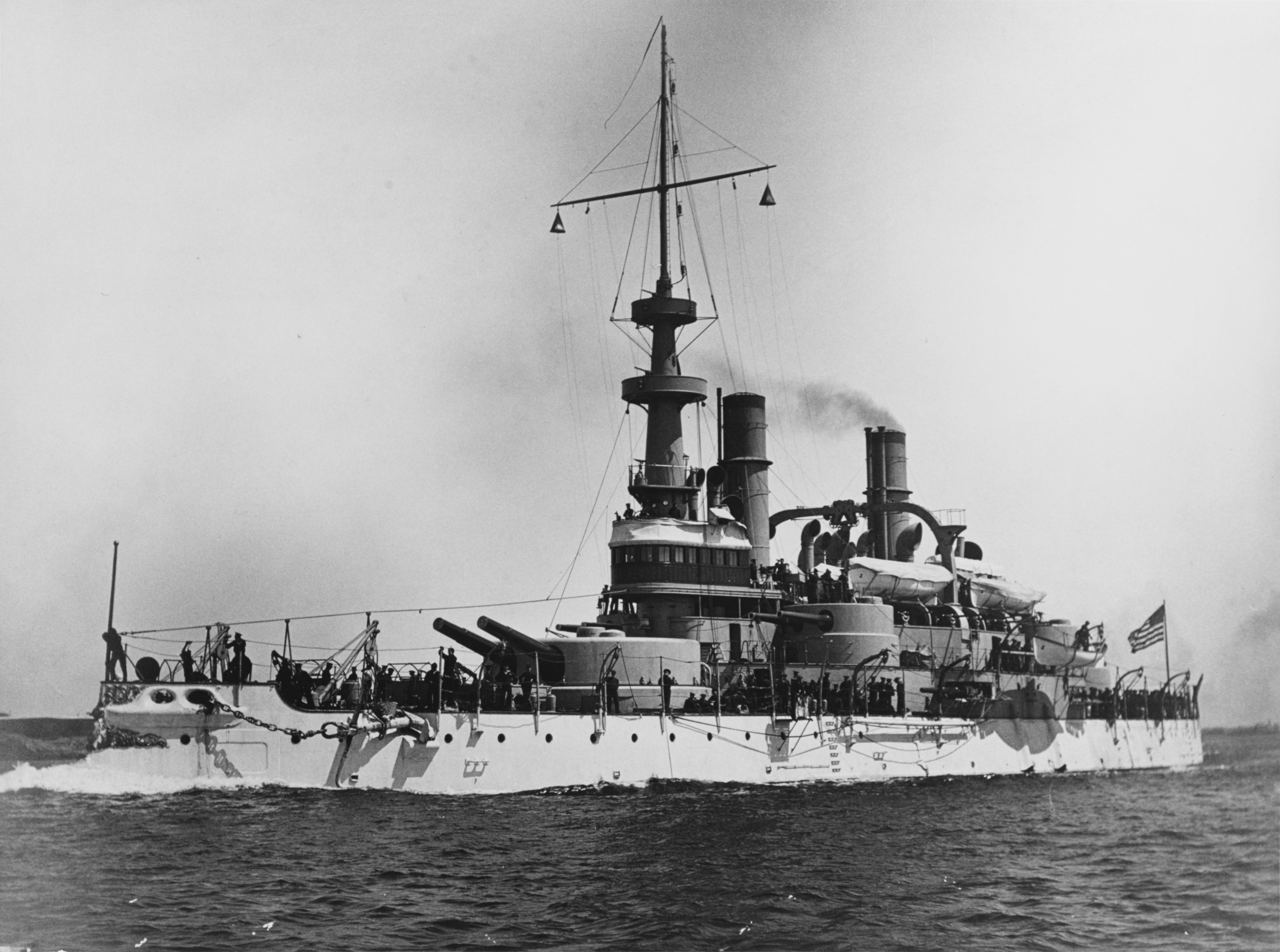
USS Indiana (BB-1) around the time of the Spanish–American War

Following tours of shore duty at Norfolk and Washington; and at sea in Iroquois, Tallapoosa, and Lancaster — Captain Waller served in the battleship USS Indiana (BB-1), lead ship of the new Indiana class during the Spanish–American War and was in that vessel as Commander of its Marine detachment during the Battle of Santiago on 3 July 1898. During this naval engagement, Spanish Admiral Pascual Cervera's fleet was chased down and totally destroyed by the American fleet waiting just outside the harbor.

Furor chased by Iowa, Indiana and New York

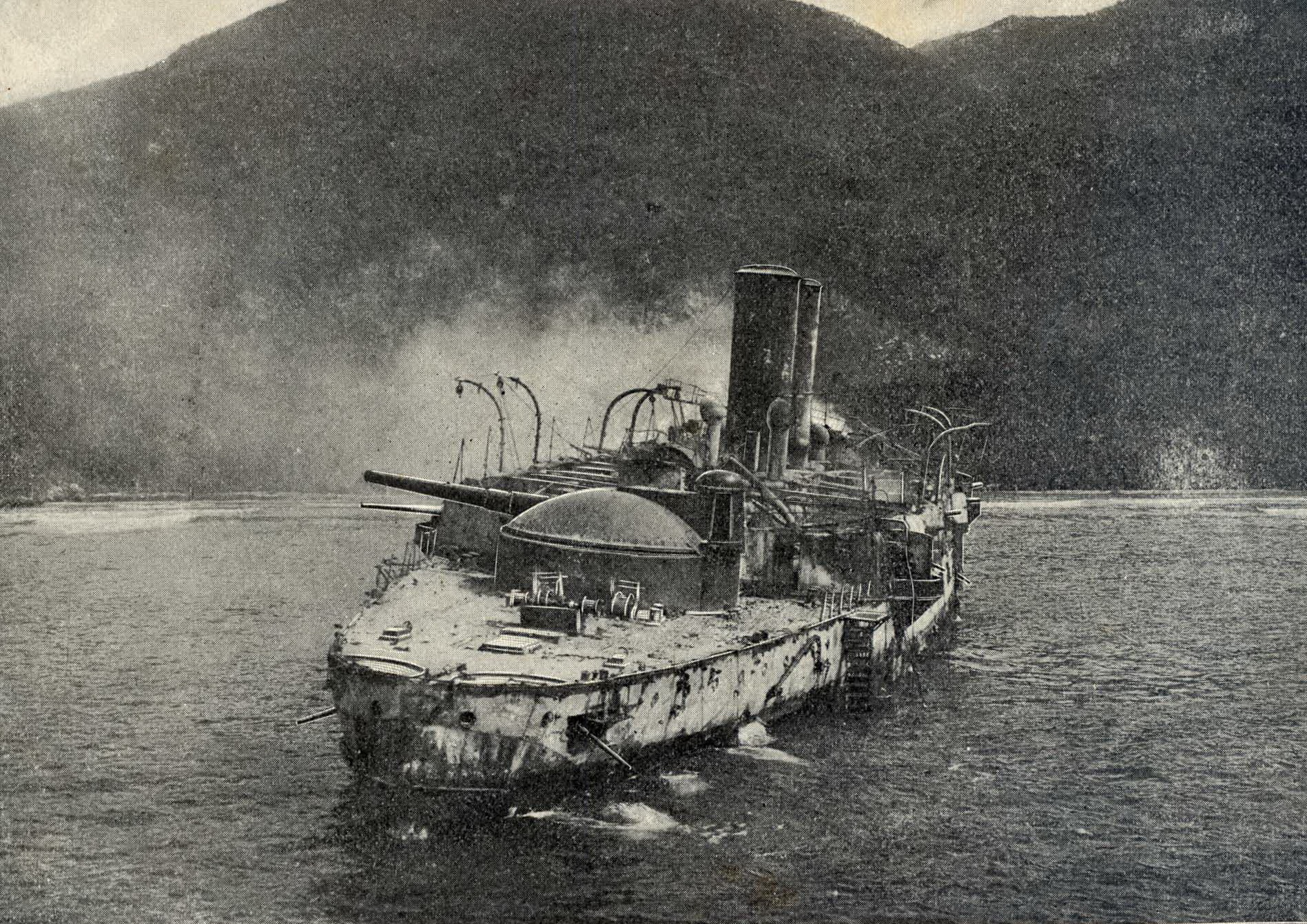
The wreck of Almirante Oquendo in 1898.

Due to her position at the extreme eastern end of the blockade, the Indiana could not participate in the initial chase after the enemy cruisers made their sortie without cutting across the bow of the USS Oregon, which Captain Taylor, the ship's commander, wisely decided not to do. The battleship and the Marines manning her secondary batteries were, however, able to engage and aid in the destruction of the Furor and the Plutón, the fifth and sixth ships bringing up the rear of Spanish line, as they left the bay. Still too close to his squadron to risk using his big guns, Taylor called on Waller and his Marines to take the destroyers under fire with the 6-inch (152 mm) batteries. Captain Waller ran from gun to gun, shouting orders and encouragement, as his Leathernecks pulverized the Spanish ships.

"The only trouble experienced at that time was the difficulty in keeping the men not actually engaged under cover", Waller later wrote. "They would creep up to the guns, waiting for the chance to take part in the action."

Within minutes both destroyers were ablaze and sinking. Still moving west, the Indiana finally got to use her thirteen-inch rifled guns, as she opened up on the Almirante Oquendo. The bombardment disabled a number of the Spanish cruiser's guns and triggered the detonation of some of its shells. Wreathed in flame, Oquendo ran aground. By now the rest of the Spanish ships had also fallen to American fire. The fighting was over, and it was one of the most lopsided victories in naval history. Every Spanish ship was destroyed and no American vessel had suffered more than token damage. Waller's gun crews reportedly fired 500 rounds from their 6-inch guns during the 61-minute melee.

In their moment of triumph, the Americans now performed an act of mercy. Captain Taylor directed Waller to launch the Indiana's whaleboats and pick up as many of the shipwrecked Spanish sailors as possible. With sailors at the oars and Marines in bow and stern to haul the swimmers aboard, Waller's detail worked all day. Men who were already weary from passing ammunition, now sunburned and with hands swollen and cracked from salt water, saved their enemies from death.

Admiral Sampson described the service of Waller and his men in his after-action report to the Secretary of the Navy:

The Iowa and the Indiana, having done good work, and not having the speed of the other ships, were directed by me ... to drop out of the chase and resume blockading stations. These vessels rescued many prisoners. ... This rescue of prisoners, including the wounded from the burning Spanish vessels, was the occasion of some of the most daring and gallant conduct of the day. The ships were burning fore and aft, their guns and reserve ammunition were exploding, and it was not known at what moment the fire would reach the main magazines. In addition to this a heavy surf was running just inside of the Spanish ships. But no risk deterred our officers and men until their work of humanity was completed.

Waller himself later remembered it:

After the destruction of the three largest ships and two torpedo-boat destroyers, I was sent to pick up the wounded and bring off prisoners from the beaches where they were huddled and in constant danger from the exploding magazines. ... After working for hours with the wounded, we took the prisoners on board ship; there were on board my ship, two hundred and forty-three in all. We issued clothes to the naked men, and the officers gave up their clothes and beds to the Spanish officers. Only a few months ago I received a letter from the widow of one of the officers of Admiral Cervera's staff, telling me of her husband's death, and saying that it was his wish that she should thank me for all that I had done for him; and I have received many tokens and letters besides this in grateful acknowledgement of the mercy shown.

Formal recognition of that action at Santiago would come to Waller sometime later.

                                             Bureau of Navigation
                                             Department of the Navy
                                             Washington, D.C., August 3, 1904

LIEUTENANT COLONEL
Littleton W.T. Waller, U.S.M.C.
Marine Barracks, Navy Yard, Norfolk, Va.

Sir:

The Bureau has much pleasure in transmitting herewith a specially meritorious medal
awarded to you in recognition of your gallant conduct in assisting in rescuing crews
from the burning Spanish ships after the battle of Santiago de Cuba on July 3, 1898.
  This medal is issued in accordance with the provisions of an act of Congress, approved
March 3, 1901, which authorized the Secretary of the Navy to issue such medals to the
officers and men of the Navy and Marine Corps who rendered specially meritorious service,
otherwise than in battle, during the Spanish–American War.

                                             Very respectfully,
                                             G.A. Converse, Chief of Bureau

Waller's was one of only ninety-three known awards of this medal, and is believed to be the only one awarded to a U.S. Marine. Because it recognizes heroism not in direct combat, the Specially Meritorious Service Medal can be considered a predecessor of today's Navy and Marine Corps Medal.

== Boxer Rebellion ==
While stationed at the naval station at Cavite early in 1900, Waller, now a major, was ordered to command a detachment of Marines, assigned to take part in the expedition mounted to relieve the siege of Peking, the Imperial Capital of China. This city, with its enclave of foreign Legations, was besieged by a mixed force of "Boxers" and Chinese Imperial troops supporting them. Accordingly, Waller and his men arrived at Taku, China, on 19 June 1900, soon moved inland, and linked up with a Russian column of 400 men.

At 02:00 on June 21, this small combined force set out for Tientsin, a large enemy held city along the route to Peking, arrayed against a Chinese contingent of some 1,500 to 2,000 men. Outnumbered from the start, the column came under heavy enemy fire and was forced to retreat, with the Russians in the lead. In a desperate rearguard action, Waller and his marines—leaving their dead behind and dragging their wounded with them—fought off the numerically superior (but less aggressive) Chinese forces and reached safety.

Waller's detachment immediately returned to duty, attached to a British column led by Commander Christopher Craddock. At 04:00 on June 24, an international army—consisting of Italian, German, Japanese, Russian, British, and American forces—set out again for Tientsin.

After participating in the final fighting for the city of Peking on July 13–14, Waller and his men took possession of the American sector and brought order out of the havoc caused by the Chinese retreat. Promoted by brevet to lieutenant colonel and advanced two numbers in grade for his performance of duty at Tientsin and Peking, Littleton Waller was commended in 1903 by Brigadier General Aaron S. Daggett, U.S. Army, Ret., in his book, America in the China Relief Expedition. He recalled that the marine had

"... participated willingly and energetically ..." with the Allies "... in all movements against the enemy ..." and that "... he and his officers and men ... reflected credit upon American valor. ..."

For his service, Major Waller received a brevet promotion, along with several of his fellow officers, who had also distinguished themselves, to lieutenant colonel. He would later become one of only 20 Marines to be awarded the USMC Brevet Medal when the decoration was created in 1921.

During his service in China, Waller also began a long-running friendship with then Lt. Smedley Butler. Waller served as Best Man at Butlers' wedding in June 1905 and the two remained close for the rest of Wallers' life.

== Philippine–American War and war crimes acquittal ==
After the Balangiga massacre, U.S. Army Brigadier General Jacob H. Smith asked for Marine Corps assistance to help subdue the Philippine population on the island of Samar. Major Waller and his Marine Battalion were given this assignment. Prior to proceeding, Major Waller had had this conversation with General Smith:

I want no prisoners. I wish you to kill and burn, the more you kill and burn the better it will please me. I want all persons killed who are capable of bearing arms in actual hostilities against the United States," General Smith said.

Since it was a popular belief among the Americans serving in the Philippines that native males were born with bolos in their hands, Major Waller asked, "I would like to know the limit of age to respect, sir?"

"Ten years," Smith said.

"Persons of ten years and older are those designated as being capable of bearing arms?", asked Waller.

"Yes," Smith confirmed his instructions a second time.

Prior to the ensuing massacre, Waller pulled aside Marine Captain David D. Porter, one of the officers tasked with carrying it out. Waller partly revoked Smith's order and told Porter to show restraint.

"Porter, I've had instructions to kill everyone over ten years old. But we are not making war on women and children, only on men capable of bearing arms. Keep that in mind no matter what other orders you receive."

Waller and his battalion of 315 Marines departed Cavite on 22 October 1901 and landed at Catbalogan, Samar, on 24 October. In the southern half of Samar, Waller ran patrols, amphibious operations, and led a detachment of marines which defeated Philippine insurgents in a battle at Sohoton cliffs on 5 November 1901. He was having some success in registering the inhabitants and pacifying the Philippine towns.

General Smith ordered Waller to scout a possible telegraph route across the island from Lanang on the east coast to Basey on the west coast – straight across trackless, uninhabited jungle. Waller's March across Samar began from Lanang on 28 December 1901 with 60 Marines, including Sgt. John H. Quick, two Philippine Scouts and 33 Philippine porters. In terrible physical conditions, most of the men were soon sick and running out of food. To stave off disaster, Major Waller divided his force on 3 January 1902. Leaving Marine Captain David D. Porter in charge of a group remaining in the jungle, Waller and 14 others went for help at Basey, arriving there on 6 January. On 7 January, Waller led a relief operation back to Porter, but for nine days could not find them.

Growing more desperate for food, Captain Porter left the sick and dying behind, under the command of Marine Lieutenant A.S. Williams, and set out with 7 Marines and 6 porters to Lanang. Having arrived at Lanang on 11 January, Cpt. Porter then sent out a relief column to pick up his own stragglers and rescue Lt. William's command. By 18 January, when Williams was rescued, 10 marines had died, one had gone insane and the porters had mutinied. Williams later testified that their mutinous behavior left the Marines in daily fear of their lives; the porters were hiding food and supplies from the Marines and keeping themselves nourished from the jungle while the Marines starved; then three porters attacked and wounded Williams with a bolo knife. The other 11 porters were placed under arrest when Williams' command reached Lanang.

After an investigation, Waller ordered the summary execution, without trial, of the 11 Filipino porters for treason, theft, disobedience and general mutiny. Ten were shot in groups of three (one had been gunned down in the water attempting to escape) The bodies were left in the square as an example, until one evening under cover of darkness, some townspeople carried them off for a Christian burial.

Waller's Marine Battalion on Samar was relieved by U.S. Army units on 26 February 1902. He and his Battalion left Samar on 28 February, returning to Cavite on 2 March 1902.

Waller reported the executions to Smith, as he had reported every other event. "It became necessary to expend 11 prisoners. Ten who were implicated in the attack on Lieutenant Williams and one who plotted against me." Smith passed Waller's report to General Adna Chaffee, who then decided to investigate these executions, despite General J. Franklin Bell and Colonel Jacob H. Smith having carried out similar executions on a much larger scale months before with no subsequent investigations.

Waller was tried for murder and manslaughter in ordering the execution of the 11 Filipino porters. A court martial began on March 17, 1902. The court-martial board consisted of 7 Army officers and 6 Marine Corps officers, led by U.S. Army General William H. Bisbee.

Major Henry P. Kingsbury, USA, the prosecutor, read the charge and specification.

CHARGE: Murder, in violation of the 58th Article of War.

SPECIFICATION: In that Major Littleton W.T. Waller, United States Marine Corps, being then and there detached for service with the United States Army by authority of the President of the United States, did, in time of war, willfully and feloniously and with malice aforethought, murder and kill eleven men, names unknown, natives of the Philippine Islands, by ordering and causing his subordinate officer under his command, John Horace Arthur Day, 1st Lieutenant, U.S. Marine Corps, and a firing detail of enlisted men under his said command, to take out said eleven men and shoot them to death, which said order was then and there carried into execution and said eleven natives, and each of them, were shot with rifles, from the effects of which they then and there died.

This at Basey, Island of Samar, Philippine Islands, on or about the 20th day of January, 1902.

Waller's attorneys, Commander Adolph Marix, USN, and Major Edwin Glenn, USA, first argued, unsuccessfully, that the Army had no jurisdiction over him, as he was still under Marine Corps command. From the court martial transcript:

"The specification does not allege that Major Walleris now detached for service with the United States Army, nor does it allege that due process against him for the offence was instituted before he was detached from the Army. The charge does not, therefore, represent a case within the jurisdiction of the Army court martial." In other words, Marix said, the Army did not charge Waller when he was assigned to them, and he is not assigned to them any longer.

"The charges brought against Major Waller were handed to him on March 4th, and constitute the first process against him. This was several days after he was detached from the Army ... the jurisdiction was therefore voluntarily surrendered."

"The plea is that the defendant is not subject to the jurisdiction of this court", General Bisbee noted.

"We want to know whether there is any possible written or other evidence from the President of the United States placing him on detached duty with the Army, and thereby placing him within the province of this court."

"I can have them here tomorrow morning", the prosecutor responded, and next day he submitted in evidence a series of telegrams between Admiral Rogers and General Chaffee in which the offer of three hundred Marines for service with the Sixth Brigade is made and accepted. "The Marines were serving in Samar by order of the President. The Secretary of War and the Secretary of the Navy knew they were there." Besides, Major R. N. Getty had been assigned to investigate the shootings at Basey, and had so advised Waller before the Marine battalion was detached from Sixth Brigade on 19 February."

Not sufficient, Marix responded. "Legal proceedings are defined clearly ... the accused has a right to be present, the witnesses sworn, and be represented by counsel. Nothing of the kind happened in this case. An inspector is not a judicial officer."

General Bisbee decided that the court was without jurisdiction in the case, but left open the possibility of reversing himself if instructions were received from the office of the Adjutant General of the Army.

On 21 March, the instructions arrived. The assistant adjutant general noted that the commanding general of the Philippine Department (General Arthur MacArthur) had ordered a preliminary examination of the case, with a view to legal action, before Waller was relieved of duty with the Army. Waller assisted in Major Getty's investigation, and was questioned by him, so he had to know that he was a party to the proceedings. Besides, a "brief lapse of jurisdiction" cannot mitigate a murder charge.

General Bisbee "now decides that (the court) has jurisdiction and directs that the case proceed to trial." Waller enters his plea:

To the specification – Guilty, except to the words "willfully and feloniously and with malice aforethought, murder and" – to those words, not guilty. To the charge – Not Guilty

Waller did not use Smith's orders "I want all persons killed" to justify his deed, instead relying on the rules of war and provisions of a Civil War General Order Number 100 that authorized "exceeding force", much as J. Franklin Bell had successfully done months before. Waller's counsel had rested his defense.

The prosecution then decided to call General Smith as a rebuttal witness. On April 7, 1902, in sworn testimony, Smith denied that he had given any special verbal orders to Waller. Waller then produced three officers, who corroborated Waller's version of the Smith–Waller conversation, and copies of every written order he had received from Smith, Waller informed the court he had been directed to take no prisoners and to kill every male Filipino over age 10.

During the trial, American newspapers, including his hometown newspaper in Philadelphia, nicknamed Waller the "Butcher of Samar".

The court martial board voted 11–2 for acquittal of Waller. Later, the U.S. Army Judge Advocate General dismissed the entire case, agreeing that a Marine Corps officer was not subject to an Army court.

As a result of evidence introduced at the Waller trial, General Smith was then court martialed, convicted, and admonished; President Roosevelt personally ordered his dismissal from the army.

== Banana Wars ==
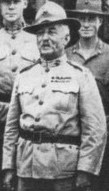
Waller at Vera Cruz, Mexico in 1914

Waller subsequently returned to the United States, where he was appointed in charge of USMC recruiting efforts in Pennsylvania, Delaware, and New Jersey until 1903. In 1904, Waller was made commander of USMC forces stationed in the Panama Canal Zone. Two years later in 1906, he was appointed to command U.S. forces in the Republic of Cuba, being promoted to the commander of the Provisional Brigade by 1911. Waller then commanded the USMC Barracks located at the Mare Island Naval Shipyard from 1911 to 1914. Leading the 1st Marine Brigade, Waller subsequently participated in the Battle of Veracruz in 1914 before being appointed to command USMC forces during the United States occupation of Haiti. Under his command, USMC troops brutally suppressed resistance to the occupation by bands of Haitian insurgents known as Cacos, successfully defeating them in the First Caco War. During the occupation, Waller stated that "I know the nigger and how to handle him", in reference to Haiti's population being of mostly African descent.

== Later years ==
Conventional wisdom holds that the Manila court-martial cost Waller the post of Commandant of the Marine Corps. Most sources claim that his career was stunted, but an extract from his Officer's Qualification Record tells a different story. Waller's acquittal is dated April 28, 1902. He had been "promoted MAJOR August 28, 1899, to take rank from July 25, 1899". He is "promoted LIEUTENANT COLONEL, U.S.M.C., by and with the advice and consent of the Senate, March 23, 1903, to rank as such from March 3, 1903", and then "promoted COLONEL, by and with the advice and consent of the Senate, March 21, 1905, to rank from March 11, 1905".

On March 28, 1901, appointed Lieutenant-Colonel by brevet, in the Marine Corps of the United States, for distinguished conduct and public service in the presence of the enemy near Tientsin, China, from the 13th day of July, 1900. On March 28, 1901, advanced two (2) numbers in rank on the list of Majors, in the Marine Corps, for eminent and conspicuous conduct in battle on June 21, & 23, and July 3, and 9, 1900, at Tientsin, China, from March 8, 1901. Under suspension for ten days (10) from September 18, 1901, for being under the influence of liquor, and thereby unfit for the proper performance of duty.

Suspended from duty for being drunk, with an official entry made of the event, Waller was still promoted from captain to full colonel in less than six years. This is hardly indicative of a stalled career, especially in the early twentieth century. It becomes hard to believe that the court-martial prevented Waller's appointment to the commandancy, especially since he is promoted less than a year afterward.

But if it was not the reason, it may have been the excuse. Captain Archibald Butt, U.S. Army, military aide to Presidents Roosevelt and Taft, recalls a White House meeting in March 1910. The subject was the next Marine Commandant. Secretary of the Navy George Meyer had the necessary papers to appoint Waller, and President Taft agreed. Then, according to Butt:

(Waller's) name was practically written, when Senator Penrose of Pennsylvania called on the President, and in five minutes Waller was sidetracked and Biddle elevated to the place in command. (Biddle) happened to be a cousin of the junior Senator from Pennsylvania, George T. Oliver.

With no love for the Marines and no reason to care who their Commandant was, Butt had no reason to lie. Nor is he alone in giving this version of events.

In the Proceedings of the U. S. Naval Institute, November 1986, Lieutenant Colonel Merrill L. Bartlett, U.S. Marine Corps (Retired), discusses the career of Waller's protege Smedley D. Butler. Like Waller, Butler was the choice for Commandant among the rank-and-file of the Corps. Butler, too, was denied the position, because of the influence of politics. Col. Bartlett writes:

In 1910, following a spate of in-house acrimony between the CMC, Major General George F. Elliott, and the Adjutant and Inspector, the colorful Colonel Charles H. Lauchheimer, Elliott opted for retirement. Most observers -- including Butler -- assumed that the venerable Waller would gain the Corps' highest post. However, in a private meeting with Secretary of the Navy George von Meyer, President William H. Taft bowed to pressure from the powerful Pennsylvania Senator Boies Penrose and appointed his constituent, Philadelphia's William A. Biddle, to the post.

Political influence was even more pronounced in the selection of the next Commandant. Col. Bartlett continues:

The passage of legislation in 1913 that limited the tenure of each CMC to four years -- unless reappointed -- ended the traditional system of appointment until retirement, which had been in effect since 1798. Instead Josephus Daniels, the new Secretary of the Navy . . .[sent] Biddle into retirement and began the search for a new CMC. Excitedly, Butler assumed that Waller would win this time. He generated a flurry of correspondence knowing full well that every letter would be read by his congressman father ... Much to Butler's dismay -- and despite whatever political leverage his father applied -- stronger forces determined the selection of a new CMC in 1913-14. Biddle had hoped to slide in the veteran campaigner, Colonel Lincoln Karmany, before sufficient political forces could be organized to oppose this handpicked successor. But Secretary Daniels eliminated Karmany from the running when he learned of his messy divorce in order to marry another woman. Waller had the endorsement of all 21 Democrats in the Senate, but carried the unacceptable baggage of Samar with him. Secretary Daniels reasoned that it made no sense to appoint an officer with a reputation for callous and inhumane treatment of the Filipino people, just when the Wilson Administration promised a more enlightened and humane government of the Philippines.

Several key points are evident here. Waller had the endorsement of "all 21 Democrats in the Senate", but in 1913 the U.S. had forty-eight states, for a total of ninety-six senators. The Democrats were not only a minority, they were all Southerners. Waller's chances were hardly helped by the small number of Democratic senators or by the fact that his grandfather L.W. Tazewell was the former Democratic governor of Virginia. Col. Bartlett speaks of "the unacceptable baggage of Samar", but as we have seen this did not seem to hamper Waller's rise from captain to colonel. Waller's "reputation for callous and inhumane treatment of the Filipino people" was based almost entirely on the editorials in the anti-imperialist press, but these views had been rejected by the public long before. The elections of Roosevelt in 1904 and Taft in 1908 came long after the courts-martial not only of Waller and Day, but also of the Army officers Smith and Glenn.

Waller was also frustrated at being sidelined, as he saw it, from the fighting in France. Relatively few senior Marine officers saw active duty in France, all of them a generation younger than Waller.

On March 22, 1920, Waller appeared before the Retirement Board at Marine Corps Headquarters. The board found that he was "incapacitated for active service by reason of arterial sclerosis, general, and that his incapacity is the result of an incident of the service." On March 27 the finding was made official:

THE WHITE HOUSE

The proceedings and findings of the Retiring Board in this case are approved, and Major

General (T) Littleton W.T. Waller, U.S. Marine Corps, will be retired from active service and

placed on the retired list with the rank he now temporarily holds, that of Major General, in

conformity with the provisions of Sections 1622 and 1251 of the Revised Statutes, and those of

the act of May 22, 1917.

WOODROW WILSON

The last entry in his Officer's Qualification Record reads:

Continued on active duty at Headquarters, Advanced Base Force until June 16, 1920, on which date relieved from all active duty.

Three of Waller's sons would go on to serve their country as Officers in the Marines and Navy. Littleton W. T. Waller Jr. served as a major in the Marine Corps during World War I and saw extensive action on the Western Front. Waller Jr. alternately commanded the 81st Company, First Machine Gun Battalion; the Sixth Machine Gun Battalion, Second Division, the Eighth Machine Gun Battalion, Third Division; and served as the Division Machine Gun Officer of the Second Division. During his service he participated in the following operations: the Toulon-Troyon Sector; in action with 47th French Infantry at Julgonne; in action on the Marne River; in action at Belleau Wood; in action in the Aisne-Marne Offensive; Marbache Sector; St. Mihiel Sector; and the Meuse-Argonne Offensive. Waller Jr. later participated in the march to the Rhine and served with the Army of Occupation. He was awarded the Croix de Guerre for action in the Champagne Sector; made a Chevalier of the Legion of Honor for action in the Aisne-Marne Offensive; and was cited in General Orders, No. 88, Headquarters, Second Division, dated December 31, 1918. He also received letters of commendation from the Commanding Officer, Second Battalion, Sixth Regiment, Commanding General, Fourth Brigade and Commanding General, Second Division. Waller Jr. was also awarded the Navy Cross by the Secretary of the Navy and would go on to serve a full career in the Corps, eventually rising to the rank of major general just as his Father had.

Having been promoted to brigadier general on 29 August 1916 and to major general on 29 August 1918, Littleton W. T. Waller Sr. closed out his active duty in the Marine Corps as Commander of the Advanced Base Force at Philadelphia Navy Yard from 8 January 1917 until his retirement in June 1920. According to the entry in Webster's American Military Biographies, L. W. T. Waller was "reputed to have taken part in more actions than any other Marine officer of the period."

Major General Waller lived in retirement in Philadelphia until his death on 13 July 1926 at the age of 69. He is buried in Arlington National Cemetery.

In 1942, the destroyer USS Waller (DD-466) was named in his honor.

Waller Drive in Huntingdon Valley, PA is named after him. A residential cul-de-sac, the street and all of the properties along it were originally part of the estate surrounding the house he had built in 1916, in suburban Philadelphia.

== Memberships ==
General Waller was a member of the Military Order of Foreign Wars, Military Order of the Dragon and the Military Order of the Carabao.

== The decorations and medals of General Waller ==
General Waller was one of the few recipients, possibly the only, of both the Brevet Medal and Specially Meritorious Service Medal. With only 23 and 93 total awards respectively, they are two of the rarest decorations in American military history. (By way of comparison, there have been over 3,000 awards of the Medal of Honor and over 600 of the Gold Lifesaving Medal.)

Marine Corps Brevet Medal		Specially Meritorious Service Medal	Marine Corps Expeditionary Medal with 3 service stars
West Indies Naval Campaign Medal	Spanish Campaign Medal	Philippine Campaign Medal	China Relief Expedition Medal
Cuban Pacification Medal	Mexican Service Medal	Haitian Campaign Medal (1917)	World War I Victory Medal with "Atlantic Fleet" and "West Indies" clasps

Marine Corps Brevet Medal

Waller was one of only twenty living Marine officers whose gallantry in action during the Civil War, Spanish–American War, Philippine Campaign and the Boxer Rebellion had been recognized by a brevet commission. Waller's medal recognized his promotion to the brevet rank of lieutenant colonel, "for distinguished conduct and public service in the presence of the enemy near Tientsin, China", on 13 July 1900. He had retired prior to the creation of the medal, but went to Washington to receive it.

Specially Meritorious Service Medal

The letter of August 3, 1904, awarding this medal to Waller "in recognition of your gallant conduct in assisting in rescuing crews from the burning Spanish ships after the battle of Santiago de Cuba on July 3, 1898" is reproduced above. This is one of only 93 known awards of the decoration, given for "specially meritorious service, otherwise than in battle, during the Spanish–American War". It was not awarded before the war with Spain, nor since. Because it recognizes heroism not in direct contact with the enemy, it may be considered a forerunner to the present-day Navy and Marine Corps Medal. The decoration is a bronze cross pattee, with an anchor in its center encircled by a wreath of oak and laurel and the inscription "U.S. Naval Campaign West Indies". The arms of the cross are inscribed "Specially Meritorious Service 1898", and it is suspended from a bright red ribbon.

Marine Corps Expeditionary Medal

Originally authorized in 1919 as a ribbon-only award. The medal was authorized in 1929, three years after Waller's death. It is not known if his survivors received the medal posthumously. At the time, numerals were worn on the ribbon to show total awards. Waller was authorized the ribbon with numeral "4" in recognition of the following service:

- Egypt, 1882
- Panama, 1903–04
- Cuba, 1911–12
- Haiti, 1916–17

Sampson Medal

Properly speaking, the "Commemorative Medal for Naval Engagements in the West Indies", it took its popular name from the fact that its obverse shows a portrait of Rear Admiral William T. Sampson. The ribbon, red with a wide central blue stripe, is suspended from a bronze pin bearing the name of the ship on which the individual served. Bronze bars are pinned to the front of the ribbon for each engagement with the enemy. No attachments were worn on the ribbon bar. Waller's medal had a ship's pin inscribed "USS Indiana", and four engagement bars - "San Juan Porto Rico", for the occupation of that city, and three bars inscribed "Santiago", for the siege, for the great battle of July 3, 1898, and for the occupation of the city. It was awarded in 1901.

Spanish Campaign Medal

Awarded to all members of the Navy and Marine Corps who served between 20 April and 10 December 1898.

Philippine Campaign Medal

For service ashore in the Philippine Islands between 4 February 1899 and 4 July 1902.

China Relief Expedition Medal

For service ashore in China between 24 May 1900 and 27 May 1901.

Cuban Pacification Medal

For service ashore in Cuba between 12 September 1906 and 1 April 1909.

Mexican Service Medal

For service at Vera Cruz from 21 April to 23 April 1914.

Haitian Campaign Medal

For service ashore in Haiti between 9 July and 6 December 1915.

World War I Victory Medal

For service during the period 6 April 1917 to 11 November 1918, both dates inclusive.

Photos of Waller, and other Marine officers of the late nineteenth and early twentieth centuries, also show the wearing of multiple unofficial medals awarded by fraternal and patriotic societies. The Freemasons, Sons of the American Revolution, Society of the Cincinnati, Grand Army of the Republic and United Spanish War Veterans were some of the more common ones. As military decorations and medals were uncommon prior the First World War, military regulations permitted the wearing of the insignia of societies and organizations composed of service members and/or their descendants.

There are photographs of Waller wearing the distinct triangular medal which represents the Military Order of the Carabao, an association of officers with service in the Philippines which was founded in 1900 as well as the insignia of the Military Order of Foreign Wars, which was founded in 1894 as a military society of officers and their descendants and the Military Order of the Dragon, a military society of officers who served in China during the Boxer Rebellion.

== See also ==
- Jacob H. Smith
- John H. Quick
- Smedley Butler

== Notes ==
1. "Tazewell, Littleton Waller – Biographical Information". Biographical Directory of the United States Congress.
2. Benevolent Assimilation: The American Conquest of the Philippines, 1899–1903, Stuart Creighton Miller, (Yale University Press, 1982). p. 220; PBS documentary "Crucible of Empire"; Philippine NewsLink interview with Bob Couttie author of "Hang the Dogs, The True and Tragic History of the Balangiga Massacre" Ten days after President McKinley's death, the residents of Balangiga, a tiny village 400 miles southeast of Manila, attacked the local U.S. garrison. While U.S. soldiers ate breakfast, the church bells rang a signal. Filipinos brandishing machetes emerged from their hiding places. Forty-eight Americans, two-thirds of the garrison, were butchered, in what is called the Balangiga massacre. On the orders of General Jacob H. Smith, U.S. troops retaliated against the entire island (600 square miles) of Samar where Balangiga is located. The exchange is known because of two courts-martial: one was of Waller who was later court-martialed for ordering or allowing the execution of a dozen Filipino bearers, and the court-martial of Gen. Jacob H. Smith who was actually court-martialed for giving that order. They jury is out to the extent that order was carried out, because Littleton Waller actually countermanded it to his own men and said "[Captain David] Porter, I've had instructions to kill everyone over ten years old. But we are not making war on women and children, only on men capable of bearing arms. Keep that in mind no matter what other orders you receive." Undoubtedly, some men did atrocities regardless of Waller's commands.
3. Miller, pp. 226–8
4. Miller, p. 228; Philadelphia North American, March 16 and 17, 1902
5. Miller, p. 230–232; Before the "Howling Wilderness": The Military Career of Jacob Hurd Smith, 1862–1902 David L. Fritz Military Affairs Vol. 43, No. 4 (December, 1979), p. 187; "Most of the material for this article is derived from The Adjutant General's Office (AGO) 1890–1917, National Archives (NA), record group (RG) 94, File 309120 "Considerable older material is filed under the same numerical file number, but has the additional designation of S293CB1867."
