= Jacob H. Smith =

US Army general (1840–1918)

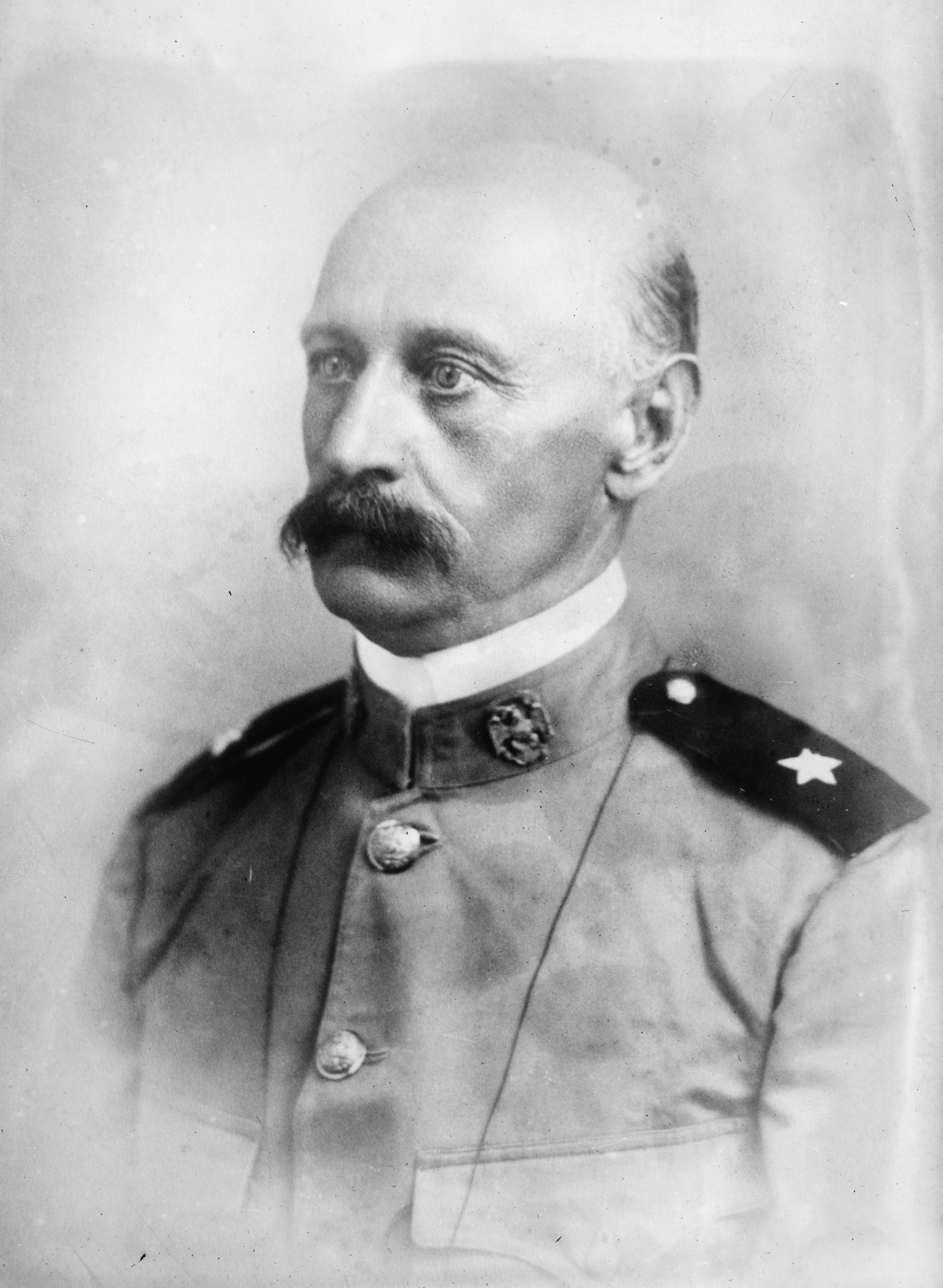
- Smith, c. 1910s
- Born: Jacob Hurd Smith; January 29, 1840; Jackson County, Ohio, U.S.
- Died: March 1, 1918 (aged 78); San Diego, California, U.S.
- Military career
- Allegiance: United States; Union
- Branch: United States Army; Union Army
- Service years: 1861–1902
- Rank: Brigadier General
- Nickname: "Howling Jake"
- Conflicts: American Civil War; Battle of Shiloh (WIA); American Indian Wars; Spanish–American War; Philippine–American War
- Awards: Brevet promotion: Major (1867); Brevet promotion: Colonel (1898); Civil War Campaign Medal; Indian Campaign Medal; Spanish Campaign Medal; Army of Cuban Occupation Medal; Philippine Campaign Medal

General Jacob Hurd Smith (January 29, 1840 – March 1, 1918) was a U.S. Army officer notorious for ordering indiscriminate retaliation on the island of Samar in response to what is called the Balangiga massacre during the Philippine–American War.

Smith's plan involved stopping the flow of food and causing extensive destruction in order to make the people of Samar abandon their support for the rebels out of fear and malnutrition and turn to the Americans instead. He ordered, "kill everyone over the age of ten [and make the island] a howling wilderness." Court-martialed for his conduct of operations on Samar, he was dubbed "Hell Roaring Jake" Smith, "The Monster", and "Howling Jake" by the press as a result. Most estimates are that American soldiers killed between 2,000 and 2,500 civilians. Some Filipino historians put the number as high as 5,000 civilians. Some sources place the death toll as high as 50,000, but these are now believed to have resulted from typographical errors and misreading of documents.

During the massacre, American soldiers killed military-age males, but simply ignored most of the women and children. At times, they ignored Smith's orders outright and took male prisoners. This was due to Smith's subordinate, Littleton Waller, partly revoking the order and telling the troops to show restraint.

== Civil War and post-bellum ==
Smith enlisted in the Union Army early in the Civil War, but was disabled in the Battle of Shiloh in 1862; he would later receive a brevet promotion to Major in 1867 for his actions. He tried to return to duty that summer, but the wound would not heal properly, so he became a member of the Invalid Corps, serving out the remainder of the Civil War as a mustering officer/recruiter in Louisville for three years. His service record states that he excelled in recruitment efforts for the United States Colored Troops.

While working in Louisville, he met and later married his first wife Emma L. Haverty on November 10, 1864; they quietly divorced October 1, 1880. After the war, he became a Veteran Companion of the Military Order of the Loyal Legion of the United States.

== Wartime misconduct ==
In 1869, Smith's father-in-law Daniel Haverty was being sued for fraud in connection with a bankruptcy. The creditors looked into the assets of Haverty's family, believing Haverty had hidden most of his wealth by transferring it to others. These investigations revealed a tremendous enlargement of Jacob Smith's assets during the war, from $4,000 in 1862 to $40,000 in 1865. Smith was called as a witness in the suit to explain his sudden fortune.

Smith claimed ignorance of any fraud on behalf of his father-in-law, and explained that the money was the result of a bounty brokerage scheme. During the war, eastern seaboard states were offering recruits enlistment bonuses (then called "bounties") of up to $700. Smith, along with a group of eastern recruiters, planned to fill eastern troop quotas using men from the Midwest, paying those recruits the regional bounty of $300 and pocketing the difference. Smith claimed he believed the plan was legal, at first. But before it could get off the ground, Smith took $92,000 the eastern recruiters had deposited for the bounties and used it to make speculative investments in side businesses involving whiskey, gold and diamonds. When the eastern recruiters demanded repayment which Smith could not provide, Smith noticed the recruiters refused to engage the law. From that, he concluded the plot must have been illegal. Eventually Smith's investments produced large profits, and Smith claimed he repaid all of his creditors in full, except for a few who had died or left town.

At the time of the Haverty bankruptcy, Smith had been given a temporary judge advocate assignment with the army that he was attempting to convert into a permanent position. One of the parties in the bankruptcy case informed the Judge Advocate General of the United States Army, Joseph Holt, about Smith's bounty brokerage scheme. Smith wrote a letter to Holt in response. Smith's letter attempted to cast the scheme in a sympathetic light. He wrapped himself in the flag and argued that he had been in seven engagements and had been wounded in the Battle of Shiloh. He portrayed himself as "one who took upon himself all the odium that the rebels and conservatives of Louisville, Kentucky, heaped upon him, by being the first officer, to my knowledge, who commenced mustering into service the colored man in Kentucky during the year 1863." Smith said that he had scoured Kentucky's prison pens, jails, and workhouses to find these men and that his only aim was to serve his God and his country properly. Smith admitted to speculating, but justified it by saying that others had made three times as much money as he had in Louisville during the war, and he had not defrauded anyone.

Holt did not accept Smith's excuse, and submitted the papers to the Secretary of War with the recommendation that the matter be given to the United States Senate Committee on Military Affairs, who had the authority to confirm Smith for the permanent position he sought. Smith wrote a more apologetic explanation to the Secretary, painting himself as a gullible dupe. He explained the plot in detail, and argued that his only offense was using other people's money for his own profit. He claimed that all his creditors had been repaid, and no recruits had been defrauded out of their bounty. But conveniently, Smith claimed that all other witnesses to his story had either died or left the country, and that he had destroyed or lost all of his own bank account records for that period.

The Secretary found Smith's explanation to be unavailing. Smith's temporary appointment as judge advocate was revoked by the President. In the Judge Advocate General's summation of the events, Holt excoriated Smith for how his own testimony appeared to suggest he believed it was alright to mislead and deceive military auditors. Holt concluded, "[b]y his conflicting statements and his unfortunate explanation, he is placed in a dilemma full of embarrassment."

== Further gaffes ==
In 1877, Smith responded to a written reprimand from his colonel with a disrespectful longhand response. Technically, the colonel could not censure Smith because he had been released from his command because of the incident that was being investigated. When Smith's company was marching away, the colonel indicated his displeasure. Smith's reply made fun of the colonel, saying he was like Prussian general von Moltke. Smith said the colonel's rebuke was like an "Irishman who was remonstrated for letting his wife whip him, and answered, 'It is fun for her, and don't hurt me.'" The colonel notified Smith there would be a court-martial, and so Smith wrote the colonel a nasty letter. Smith was not court-martialed, and instead Major John Pope lectured Smith and recommended the whole affair be dropped since Smith had apologized.

== Legal problems ==
During the 1870s, Smith was called away from duty for several lawsuits for debt. One case dragged on in a Chicago court from 1869 to 1883.

Another creditor, named Henry, continued a claim against Smith for $7 for payment of a harness. The case dragged on from 1871 to 1901. Henry even sent a letter to President McKinley about Smith and his $7 debt.

On July 31, 1884, Smith was sued again in Chicago by the legal firm Pedrick and Dawson.

Smith was court martialed in 1885 in San Antonio for "conduct unbecoming an officer and a gentleman", for deeds in the "Mint Saloon" in Brackett, Texas. The opposing party claimed Smith had been playing a game of draw poker with M. S. Moore and C. H. Holzy a.k.a. Jiggerty, lost $135 to Moore, and refused to pay the debt. Smith was found guilty and was confined to Fort Clark for a year and forfeited half his pay for the same time period. The Reviewing Authority thought the court was too lenient on Smith. It also felt that Smith's courtroom tactics made a mockery of the legal procedure:

- demanding witnesses from distant and impractical locations especially since he never actually used the witnesses in court,
- local civilian witnesses for the plaintiff were intimidated so they refused to testify against Smith,
- local civilian witnesses for the defense selectively decided which questions they would answer and which they would not.

While the draw poker case was still pending in 1885, Smith wrote a letter to the Adjutant General of the Army regarding the case, but many of the statements were lies. Because of this, Smith was tried again in 1886. He was found guilty, and would have been thrown out of the military. Smith was saved by the intercession of President Grover Cleveland, who allowed Smith to return to the military with merely a reprimand.

In 1891, Smith was charged with using enlisted men as his servants in his home.

== Philippine–American War ==
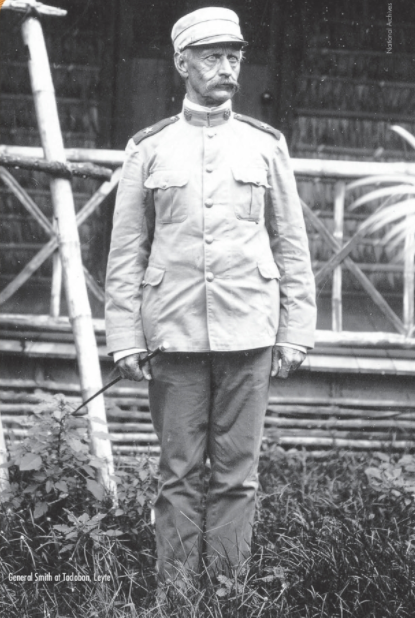
Smith in Tacloban, Philippines, 1901

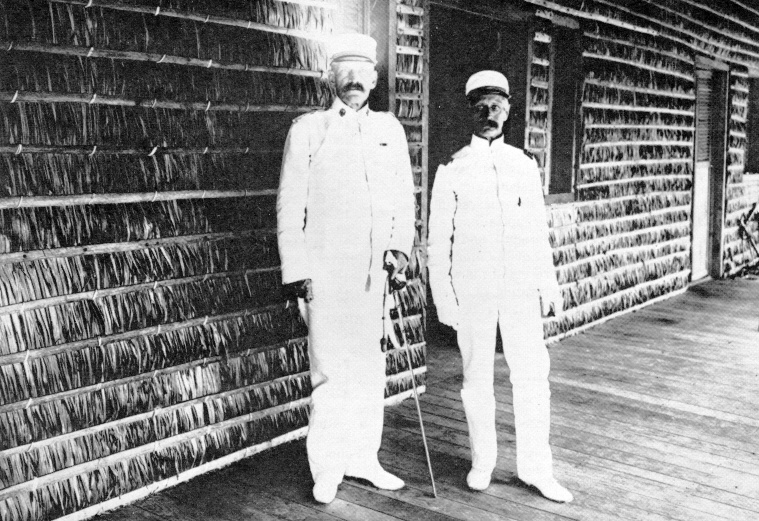
Smith with Major General Adna Chaffee in Tacoblan, Leyte, 1902

Smith was sent to the Philippines during the Philippine–American War.

=== Smith describes his tactics to the media ===
In December 1899, Jacob H. Smith (now a colonel) boastingly informed reporters in the Philippines that, because the natives were "worse than fighting Indians", he had already adopted appropriate tactics that he had learned in the American frontier fighting Native Americans, characterized by Smith as "savages", without waiting for orders to do so from General Elwell S. Otis. This interview provoked a headline announcing that "Colonel Smith of 12th Orders All Insurgents Shot At Hand", and the New York Times endorsed Smith's tactics as "long overdue."

=== Promotion to Brigadier General ===
Starting in the late 1880s, the U.S. Army had adopted the system of filling each brigadier general position not by qualifications, but by mere seniority. The system usually gave elderly colonels a few more months, weeks or days of active duty with a new title, followed by nearly immediate retirement at a higher pay rate. Jacob Smith was slightly younger and his promotion to general was made earlier than typical; he had three years left until retirement became mandatory by law.

William Howard Taft, who was the civilian governor of the Philippines, decided to promote Smith to Brigadier General on 1 June 1900, citing his service during the Spanish–American War and believing that he would retire after being promoted. Smith was promoted, but he decided not to retire.

=== Smith causes an uproar in Luzon ===
Resentment of Spanish Dominican Friars of the Catholic Church were alleged to be the principal cause of the Filipino revolution against Spain, and many friars were killed by the Filipino population. American foreign policy was to stay strictly neutral in religious matters.

In September 1900, while Smith was the military governor of Pangasinan, Tarlac, and Zambales on Luzon, Smith intervened in a religious dispute in the village of Dagupan. Smith sided with a priest who was friendly with the friars. This caused an angry civilian uproar in central Luzon.

=== Samar campaign ===
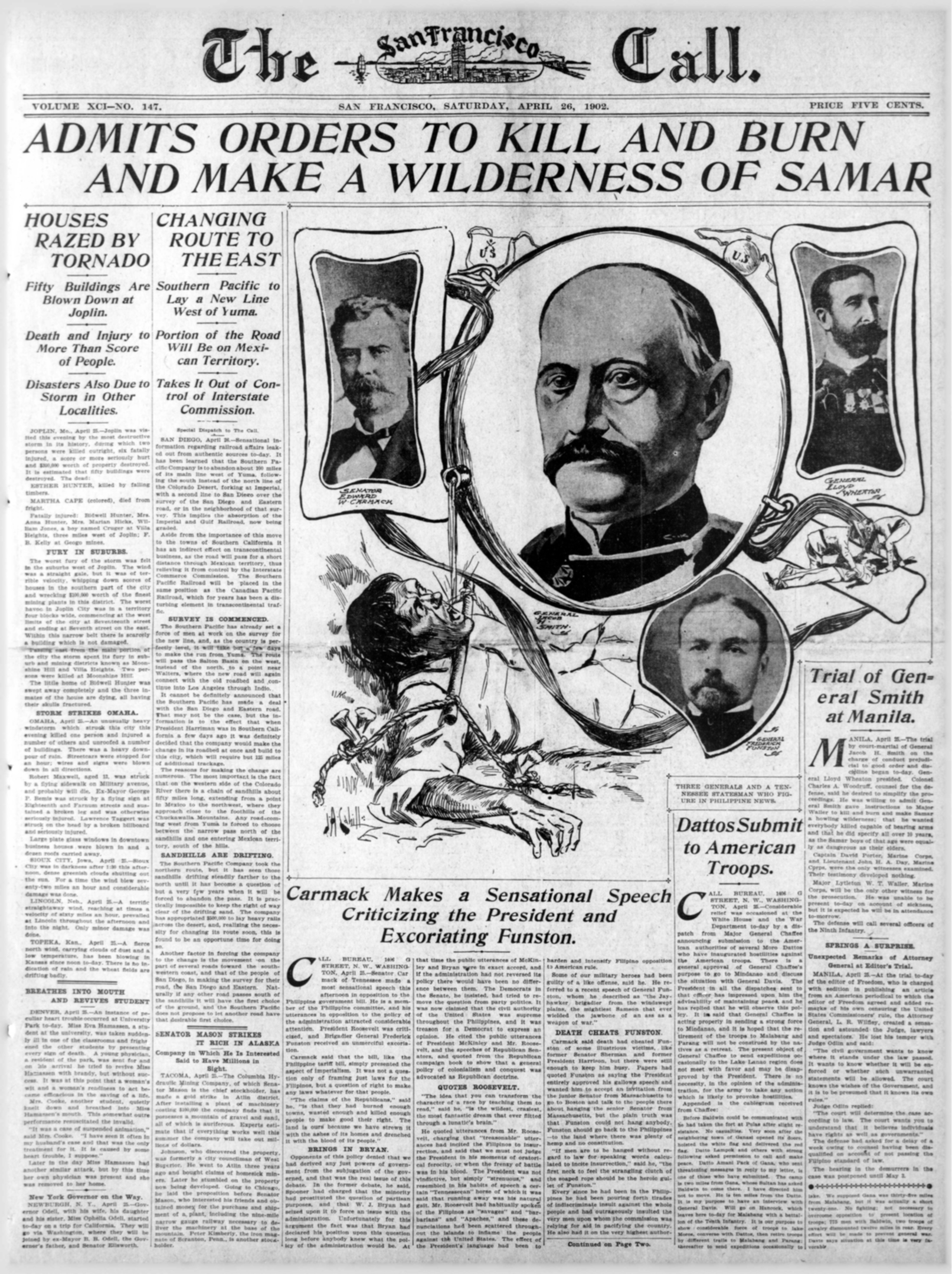
The San Francisco Call, 26 April 1902

On September 28, 1901, fifty-one American soldiers of Company C of the 9th U.S. Infantry Regiment who had been stationed in the town of Balangiga, the third largest town on the southern coast of Samar Island, were killed in a surprise guerrilla attack. They had been deployed to Balangiga to close its port and prevent supplies reaching Filipino forces in the interior, which at that time were under the command of General Vicente Lukbán. Lukbán had been sent there in December 1898 to govern the island on behalf of the First Philippine Republic under Emilio Aguinaldo.

The attack provoked shock in the U.S. public, with newspapers equating what they called a "massacre" to George Armstrong Custer's last stand at the Battle of the Little Bighorn in 1876. Major General Adna R. Chaffee, military governor of the Philippines, received orders from President Theodore Roosevelt to pacify Samar. To this end, Chaffee appointed Smith to Samar to accomplish the task.

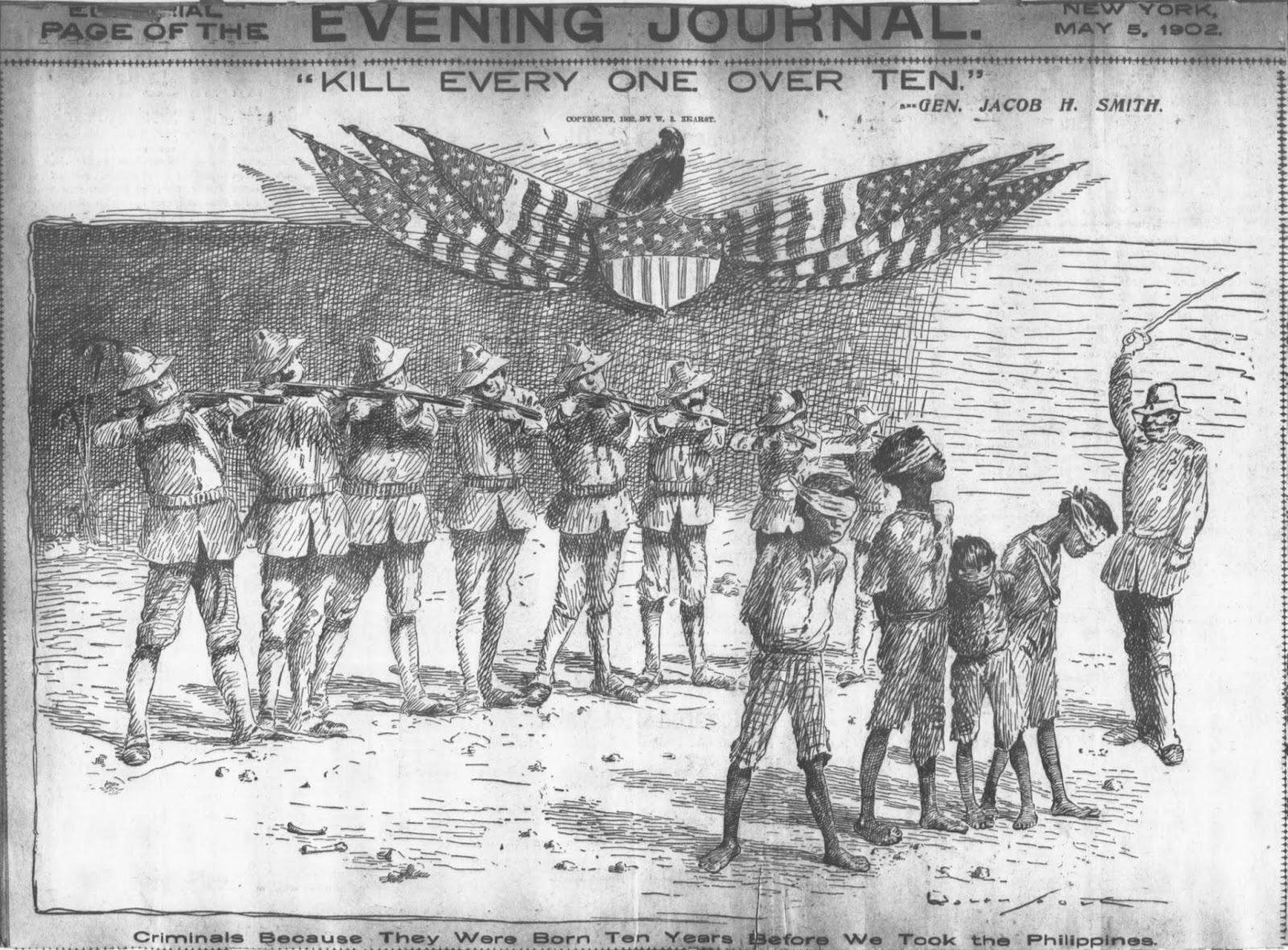
Smith's order "Kill Everyone Over Ten" became a caption in the New York Journal cartoon on May 5, 1902. The Old Glory draped an American shield on which a vulture replaced the bald eagle. The caption at the bottom proclaimed, "Criminals Because They Were Born Ten Years Before We Took the Philippines." Smith's conduct of this campaign eventually resulted in his court-martial.

Smith instructed Major Littleton Waller, commanding officer of a battalion of 315 U.S. Marines assigned to bolster his forces in Samar, regarding the conduct of pacification:

'I want no prisoners. I wish you to kill and burn, the more you kill and burn the better it will please me. I want all persons killed who are capable of bearing arms in actual hostilities against the United States,' General Jacob H. Smith said.

Since it was a popular belief among the Americans serving in the Philippines that native males were born with bolos in their hands, Major Littleton "Tony" Waller asked, "I would like to know the limit of age to respect, sir."

"Ten years", Smith said.

"Persons of ten years and older are those designated as being capable of bearing arms?"

"Yes." Smith confirmed his instructions a second time.

A march through the island followed. Food and trade to Samar were cut off, intended to starve the revolutionaries into submission. Smith's strategy on Samar involved widespread destruction to force the inhabitants to stop supporting the guerrillas and turn to the Americans from fear and starvation. He used his troops in sweeps of the interior in search for guerrilla bands and in attempts to capture Philippine General Vicente Lukbán, but he did nothing to prevent contact between the guerrillas and the townspeople. American columns marched across the island, destroying homes and shooting people and draft animals. Littleton Waller, in a report, stated that over an eleven-day period his men burned 255 dwellings, shot 13 carabaos and killed 39 people.

The exact number of Filipino civilians killed by US troops will never be known, but an encyclopedic book on casualties in warfare puts the figure at 2,000; an exhaustive research made by a British writer in the 1990s put the figure at about 2,500. David Fritz used population ageing techniques and suggested a figure of a little more than 2,000 losses in males of combat age but nothing to support widespread killing of women and children. Some Filipino historians believe it to be around 50,000. The rate of Samar's population growth slowed as refugees fled from Samar to Leyte, yet still the population of Samar increased by 21,456 during the war. A great loss of life is not supported.

The abuses outraged anti-Imperialist groups in the United States when these became known in March 1902. The Judge Advocate General of the Army observed that only the good sense and restraint of the majority of Smith's subordinates prevented a complete reign of terror in Samar.

As a consequence of his order in Samar, Smith became known as "Howling Wilderness Smith." Smith earned another sobriquet, "Hell-Roaring Jake" not due to his violence in war, but because of his penchant for making outrageous oaths and the extravagance of his language. Prior to the ensuing march, Waller had pulled aside Marine Captain David Dixon Porter, one of the officers chiefly responsible for carrying it out. Waller partly revoked Smith's order and told Porter to show restraint.

"Porter, I've had instructions to kill everyone over ten years old. But we are not making war on women and children, only on men capable of bearing arms. Keep that in mind no matter what other orders you receive."

=== Waller's court-martial ===
Smith's order was not discovered by superiors or the media at the time it was given. It was only revealed in the course of the court martial of Major Littleton Waller, one of Smith's subordinates, which began on March 17, 1902. Major Waller was being tried for ordering the execution of eleven mutinous Filipino porters.

Waller did not mention Smith's order in his defense, instead relying on provisions of U.S. Armies General Order Number 100, also known as the Lieber Code, dictating how U.S. soldiers were expected to conduct themselves during wartime. That code is considered a precursor to the Geneva Conventions but, in contrast to later agreements regarding rules of war, it permitted the killing of prisoners of war in reprisal for violations of the rules of war by the enemy, and called for the summary execution of spies, saboteurs and guerrilla fighters.

Waller's counsel had rested his defense. The prosecution decided to call Smith as a rebuttal witness. Smith was not above selling out Waller to save his career. On April 7, 1902, Smith perjured himself again by denying that he had given any special verbal orders to Waller.

In response, Waller revealed Smith's order to him and produced three officers who corroborated Waller's version of the Smith–Waller conversation, and copies of every written order he had received from Smith. Waller informed the court he had been directed to take no prisoners and to kill every male Filipino over 10.

General Adna Chaffee, military governor of the Philippines, cabled the War Department requesting permission to keep Smith in the islands for a short time, since he feared that Smith, if given the opportunity to talk to reporters, could speak "absurdly unwise" and might say things contrary to the facts established in the case, "or act like an unbalanced lunatic."

=== Smith's court-martial ===
In May 1902, Smith faced a court-martial for his orders, being tried not for murder or other war crimes, but for "conduct to the prejudice of good order and military discipline". The court-martial found Smith guilty and sentenced him "to be admonished by the reviewing authority."

To ease the subsequent public outcry in America, Secretary of War Elihu Root recommended that Smith be retired. President Roosevelt accepted this recommendation, and ordered Smith's retirement from the Army, with no additional punishment.

== Later life ==
Smith retired to Portsmouth, Ohio, doing some world traveling. He volunteered his military services by letter to the Adjutant General's Office on April 5, 1917, to fight in World War I, but was refused due to old age and because his atrocities in the Philippines had severely tarnished the image and reputation of the U.S. military.

Smith died in San Diego on March 1, 1918, and was interred at Arlington National Cemetery in Washington, D.C.

== Battle wounds ==
By his 1902 court-martial, Smith had been wounded in battle three times:

- Smith had a scar from a saber cut on the head that he had received in July 1861 in Barboursville, Virginia, (now West Virginia).
- Since April 7, 1862, he had been carrying a Minié ball from the Civil War Battle of Shiloh in his hip.
- Smith also had a bullet in his body from a wound at El Caney, Cuba during the Spanish–American War.

== See also ==
- Littleton Waller
