= Earl Hancock Ellis =

United States Marine Corps officer

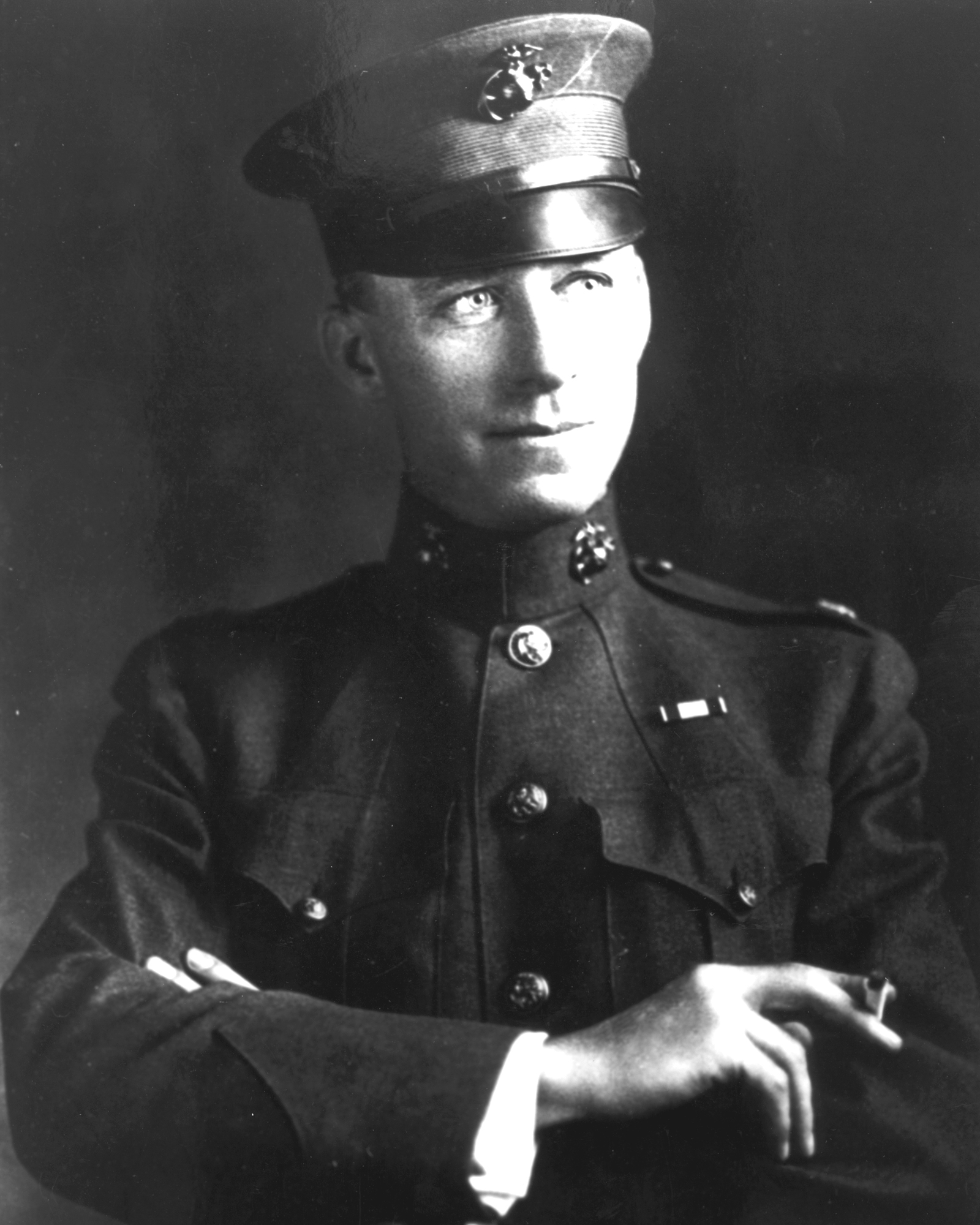
- Born: December 19, 1880; Iuka, Kansas, United States
- Died: May 12, 1923 (aged 42); Palau, South Seas Mandate, Empire of Japan
- Burial place: Arlington National Cemetery
- Military career
- Allegiance: United States of America
- Branch: United States Marine Corps
- Service years: 1900–1923
- Rank: Lieutenant Colonel
- Nickname: "Pete"
- Conflicts: Philippine–American War; World War I Banana Wars: Occupation of the Dominican Republic
- Awards: Navy Cross; Navy Distinguished Service Medal; Silver Star; Croix de guerre Légion d'honneur

Lieutenant Colonel Earl Hancock "Pete" Ellis (December 19, 1880 – May 12, 1923) was a United States Marine Corps Intelligence Officer, and author of Operations Plan 712: Advanced Base Operations in Micronesia, which became the basis for the American campaign of amphibious assault that defeated the Japanese in World War II.

During World War I, Ellis established his reputation as a superior administrator and trainer when he played a large role in the creation of Marine Corps Base Quantico and operation of the Marine Corps' first Officer Candidate School. He also earned accolades for his work as an organizer when he served as one of the lead staff officers responsible for planning the St. Mihiel and Meuse-Argonne Offensives.

Ellis was an alcoholic, and frequently alternated between bouts of excessive drinking and hospitalization to receive treatment for the illnesses and complications it caused. In 1922 and 1923, he carried out a covert spying mission to obtain information on Japanese activities on the islands of the Pacific Ocean. He died on Palau in 1923 under circumstances that were somewhat mysterious, but were probably the result of over consumption of alcohol. His remains were cremated and eventually interred at Arlington National Cemetery in 2004.

Ellis' prophetic study of Japan and the Pacific established him at the forefront of naval theorists and strategists in the field of amphibious warfare, because he foresaw both the initial Japanese attack, and the subsequent island-hopping campaigns in the Central Pacific. He is still regarded as one of the Marine Corps' primary theorists because his advocacy of amphibious operations provided the organization an enduring mission and structure as the need for what had been its primary role—security detachments aboard Navy ships and at naval bases—became less critical.

== Early life ==
Ellis was born on December 19, 1880, in Iuka, Kansas, a small farming community. His parents, Augustus and Catherine Axline Ellis, migrated from southeast Iowa to Kansas following passage of the Homestead and Preemption Acts. He was the second oldest of six surviving children. He graduated first in his high school class at Pratt, Kansas, was interested in baseball and was an avid reader, especially enjoying Rudyard Kipling's stories and poems. His inspiration to enlist came from reading magazine and newspaper articles as a teenager; during the Spanish–American War he read about the 1st Marine Battalion (Reinforced), known as "Huntington's Battalion", during its action at Cusco Well, as well as the Marine landing parties serving with Admiral George Dewey in the Philippines.

== Start of career ==
Ellis began his Marine Corps career by enlisting as a private in Chicago, Illinois, on September 3, 1900. He arrived at the Washington Navy Yard days later to begin his initial entry training, which included instruction from experienced noncommissioned officers, some of whom were veterans of the American Civil War era. In February 1901 he was promoted to corporal.

Ellis' parents subsequently made inquiries with Congressman Chester I. Long from nearby Medicine Lodge about the possibility of Ellis obtaining a commission. Long followed up with Marine Corps Commandant Charles Heywood and was informed that the Marines enabled a select number of noncommissioned officers to sit for competitive examinations. As a corporal, Ellis qualified; he was tutored by an Army colonel, performed well on the written examination, and received his commission as a second lieutenant on December 21, 1901.

On January 11, 1902, he reported to Colonel Percival C. Pope, commanding officer of the Marine Barracks at the Charlestown Navy Yard in Boston, to receive his initial training, including how to perform inspections and other tasks required of junior officers. On March 1, 1902, he was directed to report to Marine Barracks, Washington, D.C. to receive orders for an assignment in the western Pacific. He departed for San Francisco on April 1, 1902, where he boarded the steamboat Sheridan. On April 13 he arrived in Manila, Philippines, and reported for duty at the naval base along the Cavite Peninsula, where he was assigned as adjutant of the 1st Marine Regiment (also referred to as "1st Marines"). During this period, the boredom and monotony of routine occupation duty began to have a negative effect on him.

I think that this is the laziest life that a man could find—there is not a blamed thing to do except lay around, sleep and go 'bug house'. But the same, I am helping to bear the 'White Man's Burden'.

Ellis had maintained a good relationship with the commander of the 1st Marine Regiment ("1st Marines"), and in January 1903 he was assigned to command the Marine Detachment on board the battleship Kentucky, the fleet flagship of the United States Navy. The ship's crew conducted exercises in Manila Bay and entertained the British Fleet stationed in the Far East. By late February, Ellis sojourned to Singapore, China, and then to Yokohama, until the United States Secretary of the Navy ordered the Kentucky home to New York City. In March he was promoted to first lieutenant.

On May 25, 1904, Ellis was directed to report to the commandant on June 12, 1904. In June received assignment to the staff at the Marine Barracks in Washington, D.C. In September he was transferred to Mare Island, California, where he served as quartermaster until December 31, 1905.

In 1906 and 1907 Ellis was on temporary duty as a recruiting officer; he served in Oakland, California, during the summer of 1906, and Des Moines, Iowa from July 31, 1906, to April 19, 1907. He then returned to Mare Island, where he served until November 18, 1907, when he was ordered to Olongapo, Philippines, as the adjutant of the 2nd Marine Regiment ("2nd Marines"), which was commanded by Lieutenant Colonel Hiram I. Bearss ("Hiking Hiram").

== Continued career ==
On February 14, 1908, Ellis was assigned as executive officer of the 2nd Regiment's Company E. In May 1908 he was promoted to captain. When Major John A. Lejeune arrived in Olongapo to assume command of the brigade which included the 2nd Regiment, he selected Ellis to command the 2nd Regiment's Company F, and he served from July 1 to September 30, 1908. He performed special duty assignments involving disputes about land claims among the local Filipinos until resuming command of Company F from January 1 through May 31, 1909. He then commanded Company E and directed fortification and management of the local post exchange located on Grande Island. During this period, he supposedly shot the glasses off a table to lighten the mood of a 'boring' dinner while visiting a Navy chaplain. He returned to Olongapo in the spring of 1910 and resumed duties as the 2nd Regiment's adjutant, serving until returning to the United States in January 1911.

Ellis reported to the Barracks at the Washington Navy Yard on March 22, 1911. William P. Biddle was the commandant; Ellis requested aviation duty, but Biddle suggested that he attend the Naval War College. Ellis acquiesced; after graduating, he remained as a lecturer and seminar leader from October 29, 1912, to October 16, 1913. In 1913, Ellis co-authored the "Report of Naval War College Committee on Defense of Guam," with Commander F. N. Schofield.

Ellis then reported to the Philadelphia Navy Yard, where he was assigned as military intelligence officer on the staff of George Barnett. Ellis played a significant role in planning the exercises that took place in Culebra of Puerto Rico.

The Advance Base Outfit appears to be in efficient condition and it is believed that if called upon for use it would be found thoroughly satisfactory. This condition is mainly due to the excellent work of Captain Earl H. Ellis.

On February 9, 1914, Ellis and the Advance Base Force embarked to New Orleans for a possible deployment to Mexico because of tensions in the area. Barnett was slated to succeed Biddle as commandant, and selected Ellis for special assignment as a member of a Joint Army-Navy Board committee that studied the defenses of Guam and made recommendations for improvements at the outbreak of World War I. Upon arrival on Guam, Ellis was assigned as the committee's secretary and aide-de-camp, and assumed the duties of chief of police, registrar of the civil government, and Intelligence officer. While on Guam, Ellis conducted a simulated attack with a small group of men across the reef at Orote Point, which demonstrated the ability of men in boats to carry out an amphibious attack and capture artillery. Ellis's health began to deteriorate during this assignment, and his medical records attributed his illnesses to alcohol abuse.

On August 27, 1915, Ellis returned to Washington, D.C. for duty as one of the three aides-de-camp to George Barnett, and in 1916, Ellis was promoted to major. This action coincided with the beginning of US intervention on the side of the Allies in World War I, and Barnett persuaded Secretary of the Navy Josephus Daniels to allow participation of the 5th Marines in the American Expeditionary Forces (AEF).

== World War I ==
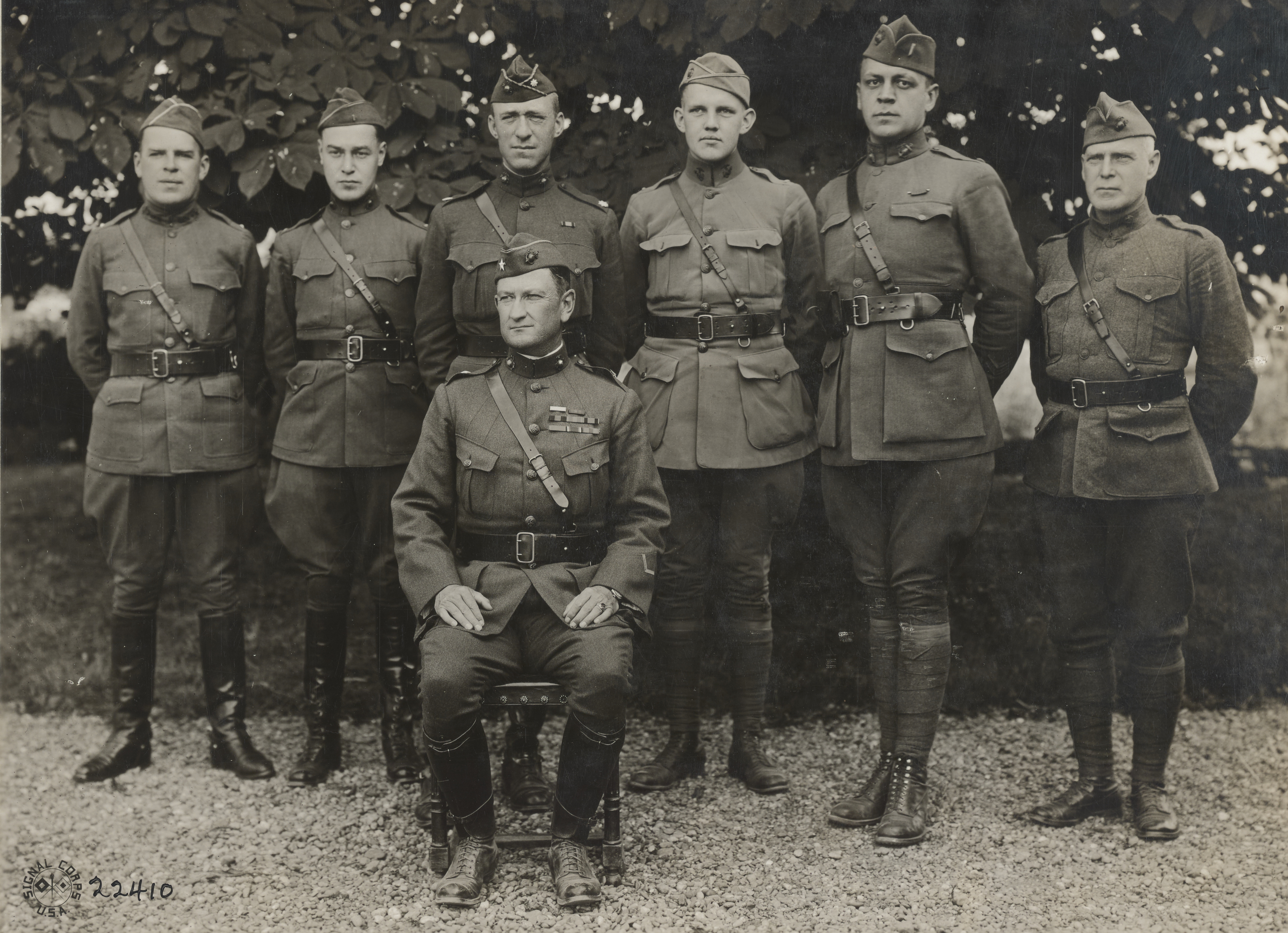
Brigadier General Wendell C. Neville, commanding the 4th Marine Brigade, together with members of his brigade staff, France, August 1918. Lieutenant Colonel Earl H. Ellis is stood in the back row, third from the left.

Ellis requested front line duty in France, but in May 1917 he was assigned to assist in the establishment of a new installation, Marine Corps Base Quantico. He later served as an instructor for the course which became the Marine Corps' Officer Candidate School. In late 1917, Barnett dispatched Ellis to France to observe the formation and training of the AEF, and report back. Ellis embarked on the Von Steuben on October 25, 1917, and returned to the US in early 1918.

The War Department directed the 6th Marines to France to join with the 5th Marines and form the 4th Marine Brigade, 2nd Division. When Lejeune received orders to go to France and command a brigade, he asked for Ellis to serve on his staff. Lejeune was assigned to the 64th Brigade, 32nd Division, and Ellis was assigned as adjutant. When Lejeune assumed command of the 4th Marine Brigade on July 25, 1918, Ellis again became Lejeune's adjutant. During this time Ellis also served as the 2nd Division's inspector.

Ellis played major roles in the planning of the St. Mihiel (Champagne) (12–16 September 1918) and Meuse-Argonne (Champagne) Offensives (September 29 to October 10, 1918) including the attack on and capture of Blanc Mont Ridge, and in the Meuse-Argonne Offensive from October 31 to November 11, 1918. After Lejeune succeeded to command of the 2nd Division, Ellis's reputation as a strategist and planner led his new brigade commander, Brigadier General Wendell Cushing Neville, to recommended Ellis for an accelerated promotion to colonel. Ellis did not receive the promotion, but was awarded both the Navy Distinguished Service Medal and Navy Cross, which he received on November 11, 1920. In addition, France awarded him the Croix de guerre and Légion d'honneur (Grade of Chevalier).

His Navy Cross was awarded for his planning of the attack and capture of Blanc Mont Ridge and his unit's role in the Meuse-Argonne Offensive. His citation read:

For exceptionally meritorious and distinguished service. As Adjutant, Fourth Brigade Marines, he displayed utter disregard of personal hardship and danger, energetic application and an unfailing devotion to the duties of his office. He has ever shown himself ready for any emergency, even when he has been without sleep or rest for several days and nights at a time. His keen analytical mind, quick grasp of intricate problems, resourcefulness, decision and readiness to take prompt action on important questions arising during the temporary absence of the Brigade Commander within the Brigade, have contributed largely to the success of the Brigade, rendered his services invaluable and won for him the high esteem and complete confidence of the Brigade Commander.

Ellis was a recipient of the Silver Star for heroism while serving with the 4th Brigade:

By direction of the President, under the provisions of the act of Congress approved July 9, 1918 (Bul. No. 43, W.D., 1918), Lieutenant Colonel Earl Hancock Ellis (MCSN: 0-260), United States Marine Corps, is cited by the Commanding General, SECOND Division, American Expeditionary Forces, for gallantry in action and a silver star may be placed upon the ribbon of the Victory Medals awarded him. Lieutenant Colonel Ellis distinguished himself while serving with Headquarters, 4th Brigade, 2d Division, American Expeditionary Forces in France during World War I.

Ellis's French Croix de guerre with Gold Star citation read:

From the 2nd to the 10th of October, 1918, near Blanc Mont, Lieutenant Colonel Ellis has shown a high sense of duty. Thanks to his intelligence, his courage and high energy, the operations that this Brigade (Fourth Brigade, Second Division) took part in, have always been successful.

== Post-World War I ==
The war ended on November 11, 1918. On November 17, the 2nd Division marched north to begin occupation duty. For the remainder of the occupation, the 4th Marine Brigade was employed along the Rhine. When the 5th Regiment's commander, Logan Feland was promoted to brigadier general, Colonel Harold Snyder assumed command of the regiment, and Ellis was appointed as regimental executive officer. On July 1, 1919, he was promoted to lieutenant colonel. In August 1919, the 4th Marine Brigade returned to the United States. On August 3, 1919, Barnett instructed Ellis to report to Galveston, Texas, for an intelligence-gathering mission on behalf of the Office of Naval Intelligence, which was concerned that Germany might attempt to seize Mexico's oil fields.

On November 25, 1919, Ellis reported for staff duty at Headquarters Marine Corps. On New Year's Day, he was admitted to the hospital, and diagnosed with depression, delirium tremens, and neurasthenia, all symptoms of acute alcohol abuse. He later traveled to Ray, Arizona, where he remained on convalescent leave for three weeks. When he was discharged from care he departed for an intelligence-gathering mission in the Dominican Republic. He embarked on a troop transport ship Kittery from Charleston, South Carolina on April 20, 1919, and reported to Brigadier General Logan Feland on May 10. While in the Dominican Republic, Ellis aided in the formation of the Guardia Nacional in Santo Domingo, which the Marines had been attempting since their occupation in 1916. Feland lauded Ellis's performance:

The effect of his [Ellis's] thorough knowledge of intelligence duties and of his hard work in training his subordinates became apparent almost at once. The intelligence reports, which had been a mass of unrelated and generally unimportant scraps of information, became well-compiled and well-digested reports of the condition in Santo Domingo.

Ellis served with the 2nd Brigade in Santo Domingo from April to December, 1920. On December 11, 1920, Ellis reported to Commandant John A. Lejeune, who assigned Ellis to head the Marine Corps Intelligence section of the newly established Division of Operations and Training (DOT) at Headquarters Marine Corps (HQMC). During this assignment, he prepared an essay regarding the details of military and civil operations required to eradicate subversion and insurgency, titled "Bush Brigades"'. This essay was considered controversial because Marines had been recently accused of killing local citizens in the Philippines and Haiti. As a result, "Bush Brigades" was never officially published, though it was printed and circulated among Marines and other members of the US military. For example, while serving as Director of the Marine Corps Intelligence section, Ellis sent an excerpt of the essay titled "Intelligence Service in Bush Brigades and Baby Nations" to Marine Corps Intelligence units worldwide.

In late 1920, Lejeune and his senior staff focused on review and revision of war plans that were prepared for use in the event of hostilities with Imperial Japan; this work included revising War Plan Orange. As part of this effort, Ellis produced the prophetic document, "Operation Plan 712 – Advanced Base Operations in Micronesia", which underscored that in the event of hostilities with Japan, the US would require advanced bases to support its fleet. The Territory of Hawaii constituted the 'only' support for the United States Navy due to the lack of naval facilities in the US possessions of the Philippines and Guam.

Japan had already occupied the Marshall, Caroline, and Palau Islands, which flanked the U.S. lines of communications in the region by more than 2,300 miles. Ellis's Operation Plan 712 predicted that Japan would initiate a war, and that Japan would stay near their own territorial waters until encountered by the U.S. fleet. He also added that great losses would occur in what he termed the "ship-shore belt" because of confusion during amphibious assaults. Ellis advised war planners to minimize confusion and casualties by organizing task forces prior to leaving base ports, and to maintain unit integrity rather than dividing Marines up among several transports.

... a major fleet action would decide the war in the Pacific; the U.S. fleet would be 25 percent superior to that of the enemy; the enemy would hold his main fleet within his defense line; fleet units must be husbanded; preliminary activities of the U.S fleet must be accomplished with a minimum of assets; Marine Corps forces must be self-sustaining; long, drawn-out operations must be avoided to afford the greatest protection to the fleet; sea objectives must include a fleet anchorage.

== Undercover mission in the Central Pacific ==
Ellis believed that US acquiescence to Japan's South Seas Mandate, which allowed Japan to occupy islands that had previously been controlled by Germany, would enable Japan to operate behind a defensive screen to expand its territory and influence without being observed. Convinced that this course would eventually lead to war between Japan and the United States, Ellis determined to carry out intelligence gathering activities to obtain details on Japan's activities.

On April 9, 1921, Ellis submitted a pro forma request to the commandant to conduct a clandestine reconnaissance mission to the Central Pacific to examine the Marshall and Caroline Islands. His request indicated that he expected to travel as a civilian and to provide an undated resignation that would enable the Marine Corps to deny knowledge of his actions if necessary. (In fact, the Marine Corps did not use the letter of resignation, and retained Ellis on its roll of active officers until he died. At the time of his death, Ellis was listed in payroll and personnel records as being on "extended leave," a status the commandant had directed his staff to use.) Shortly after he submitted his request he suffered another occurrence of neurasthenia; after recovering he asked to resume the intelligence mission in the Pacific. On May 4, 1921, Assistant Secretary of the Navy Theodore Roosevelt Jr. approved the request as the acting Secretary of the Navy. Ellis left the hospital the same day, and reported to Headquarters Marine Corps to finish making arrangements.

To hide his identity as a military officer gathering intelligence abroad, Ellis turned to John A. Hughes, who was commissioned from the ranks with him in 1902. Hughes had been medically retired in 1920, after which he joined his father's import-export business, the Hughes Trading Company. Hughes provided Ellis with a cover identity as a traveling representative of the company. After a brief visit home to Kansas, Ellis traveled to San Francisco on May 28, 1921. He subsequently traveled to New Zealand and Australia via the American President Lines SS Maheno, and arrived on September 28.

Ellis was soon hospitalized in Manila due to acute nephritis, an inflammation of the kidneys. After his discharge, he departed for Yokohama, Japan aboard SS President Jackson so he could arrange for a visa and travel authorization that would permit him to visit the mandated Caroline and the Marshall Islands. Ellis continued drinking heavily, which apparently caused him to disclose his mission to civilians, including the physicians who treated him when he was hospitalized again for neurasthenia on September 1, 1922. The local naval attaché issued Ellis orders to return home on the next available ship; Ellis ignored them, which essentially made him absent without leave (AWOL), cabled Marine Corps Headquarters for a draft of one thousand dollars he could receive at a local bank, and departed for Saipan.

Upon arrival aboard NBK Lines Kasuga Maru, he debarked at the Tanapag Harbor, and checked into a hotel in Garapan with the intention of scouting the Mariana Islands, which Japan was using as a central hub for their activities in Micronesia. The Office of Naval Intelligence was able to track his whereabouts by his withdrawals from the special bank account they established to fund his covert activities.

As Ellis continued his intelligence gathering mission and heavy drinking, he attracted the attention of the Japanese authorities, who began to keep track of his movements and activities. A friend, Kilili Sablan, suggested that Ellis check out of the hotel and live with the Sablan family. Ellis traveled around Saipan for several weeks, and produced detailed maps and charts. On December 3, 1922, he boarded the ship Matsuyama Maru to travel to the Carolines, Marshalls, Yap, and the Palaus. Upon arrival, he checked into a hotel in Koror, and again boarded the Matsuyama Maru, intending to travel to Truk; Ellis was unable to survey this island because Japanese authorities denied him passage, which was an indication that they remained suspicious of him.

During a trip from Kusaie, Ellis became ill aboard the Matsuyama Maru and was hospitalized in Jaluit by missionary Jesse "Mother" Hoppin who assigned her student Benjamin Lajipun to be Ellis' houseboy. After his recovery in January 1923, he continued to survey the Marshalls, Kwajalein, Ponape, Celebes, and New Guinea aboard the copra-collecting sailboat Caroline Maru. Ellis slept on deck and took copious notes charting the reefs and inventorying local facilities, populations, and products.

Japanese officials assigned Dr. Uichi Ishoda to watch Ellis on these voyages, and during a storm which nearly capsized Caroline Maru Ellis demonstrated a knowledge of seamanship which caused Ishoda to conclude Ellis was a naval officer. While staying on Koror, he met a teenage Palauan woman named Metauie, who became his wife. His friends attempted to keep him from drinking, but by then, he had a coterie of native boys who would obtain his alcohol for him. He continued to drink excessively, and his health continued to deteriorate. On May 12, 1923, he was unable to obtain any alcoholic beverages as the result of his friends attempting to keep him sober, and he unsuccessfully looted the home of his friend William Gibbons in search of drink. Aware of Ellis's condition, the Japanese police had two bottles of whiskey delivered to him; he consumed them both, and died later the same day from the effects of excessive alcohol intake.

== Ellis' death ==
In contemporary newspaper accounts and in later years, numerous conspiracy theorists alleged that Ellis was assassinated by Japanese military authorities, who may have poisoned the whiskey they sent him on his last day alive; however, detractors of such theories note that Ellis was known to have a severe drinking problem and likely died from an alcohol-related illness such as cirrhosis of the liver.

Ellis' official medical records indicate that not long before his death, he was admitted to a naval hospital for treatment of delirium tremens and hallucinations. Ellis researcher and author Dirk Anthony Ballendorf noted that tremors and hallucinations like the ones Ellis experienced are often attributable to depression and alcoholism:

That the Japanese would have placed poison in his whiskey is unlikely since, for Ellis whiskey itself was poison enough.

Questions also arose because the agent sent to investigate the circumstances of Ellis' death, who was the only one known to have seen Ellis's body and its condition before it was cremated, died before he could provide a report of his findings. Chief Pharmacist Lawrence Zembsch—who had treated Ellis during his hospitalization—traveled on a Japanese steamer to Palau, where he stayed at the Japanese officer's barracks. After talking to Japanese authorities who had dealings with Ellis (including the medical officer), Zembsch witnessed and photographed the exhumation of Ellis's body and its cremation, taking custody of the remains when this was completed. Zembsch became ill and suffered a nervous breakdown on the return voyage, and was admitted to a hospital in Yokohama, which was soon after buried by falling rubble in the 1923 Great Kantō earthquake. The urn containing Ellis's remains was found in the rubble, and returned to the United States. In November, 2004, the remains were disinterred from Greenlawn Cemetery in Pratt and reburied with full military honors at Arlington National Cemetery, Section 54 Site 3082.

Ellis' maps and papers were confiscated by Japanese authorities. An inquiry undertaken at the behest of General Douglas MacArthur after World War II found no trace of any of Ellis' effects, nor a report on Ellis' activities by the Japanese governor of the island. It is not clear how competently Ellis performed his map-making and analysis, given his demonstrated instability in the final months of his life and the fact that the Japanese had not yet begun fortifying Palau. Had Ellis survived, he would likely have completed addenda to "Advanced Base Operations in Micronesia" that would have provided military authorities with information on the potential military uses of the islands.

== Legacy ==
Though he had a native wife in Papua, Ellis was not married before traveling in the Pacific islands, and he had no children.

Ellis had a Marine Corps-wide reputation for excellence in organizational, administrative, intelligence analysis, and strategic planning, as evidenced by the fact that successive Commandants, including Biddle, Barnett, and Lejeune, relied on Ellis for their most important activities, including covert information gathering, despite being aware that he consumed alcohol so excessively that he often required a doctor's care and extensive hospitalization before he could return to duty.

Despite the loss of the maps and notes from his final intelligence gathering effort, Ellis' overall strategic view of the Pacific Ocean islands remained valid, especially in light of events at the start of US involvement in World War II. In Operations Plan 712: Advanced Base Operations in Micronesia, he drew particular attention to the strategic value of the Marshall and Caroline islands, noting that they "form a 'cloud' of islands stretching east and west.” This cloud concept contrasts with later emphasis on the north to south "Second Island Chain," running from Japan through the Nanpo Shoto and Mariana Islands to Indonesia.

In addition to predicting the circumstances of World War II in the Pacific, Ellis is regarded as a significant strategic theorist in the history of the Marine Corps because his advocacy of amphibious warfare aided the Marines to identify and organize for an enduring mission, which replaced what had previously been their primary function—small security detachments on ships and at naval bases.

Ellis is listed on the Roll of Honor of the Marine Corps Intelligence Association, which lists Marines from the Intelligence field who were killed in the line of duty.

Ellis Hall, one of the main educational buildings at the Marine Corps' Quantico base, is named for Ellis.

== Sources ==
- Ballendorf, Dirk Anthony (December 2002). "Earl Hancock Ellis: A Marine in Micronesia" (PDF). Micronesian Journal of the Humanities and Social Sciences. 1 (1–2).
- Ballendorf, Dirk Anthony; Bartlett, Merrill (1997). Pete Ellis: An Amphibious Warfare Prophet, 1880–1923. Annapolis, MD: Naval Institute Press. ISBN 978-1-59114-026-9.
- "Lieutenant Colonel Earl Hancock Ellis". Who's Who in Marine Corps History. History Division, United States Marine Corps. Archived from the original on 2011-05-16.
- Pierce, P. N. (February 1, 1962). "The Unsolved Mystery Of Pete Ellis". Marine Corps Gazette. Quantico, VA: Marine Corps Association and Foundation. Archived from the original on November 24, 2016.
