= Military Order of the Dragon =

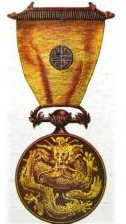
Medal of the Military Order of the Dragon.

The Military Order of the Dragon was an exclusive fraternal order founded in 1900 by members of the China Relief Expedition, a U.S. military force that participated in the Boxer Rebellion in Imperial China.

== Background ==
Following custom, the officers of the China Relief Expedition assembled in Peking just prior to the reduction of the expeditionary force, an organization of a society to perpetuate the associations formed during the expedition was created. Meetings of officers were held October 1, 2, and 3, 1900, resulting in the adoption of a name for the society, a constitution, officers, etc.

It was expected that this society would, in years to come, have a standing and historical interest similar to the well-known Aztec Society and the Military Order of the Loyal Legion. Its alliance with other kindred societies of other nations would tend to preserve acquaintance and friendships, which might otherwise be lost, and keep open the door for desirable friendly exchanges, of a social and professional nature, with foreign officers.

== Constitution ==
CONSTITUTION OF THE MILITARY ORDER OF THE DRAGON

Article I. This association shall be known as the "Military Order of the Dragon."

Article II. The purpose of the Order shall be to record the history and conserve the memory of the military campaign in China in the year 1900.

Article III. The membership of the Order shall consist of four classes:

Section 1. ACTIVE MEMBERS: All regular and volunteer commissioned officers of the United States Army, Navy and Marine Corps, Acting Assistant Surgeons and authorized Volunteer Staff Officers, who served as such, or as an enlisted man, in North China or in the Gulf of Pechili in connection with or as a part of any military operation and under the orders of the respective Army and Navy Commanders thereof between June 15 and December 31, 1900, and all members of the Diplomatic and Consular services of the United States in Tientsin and Peking during said period shall be eligible as Active Members in the Order, and shall become such upon payment of the fees and dues hereinafter provided.

Section 2. HEREDITARY MEMBERS: The nearest male descendant, twenty-one years of age or over, of Active Members, may become Hereditary Members upon election by the Executive Committee and the payment of the fees and dues hereinafter provided. Hereditary Members shall not be entitled to vote or hold office. Upon the death of the Active Member from whom the Hereditary Member derives eligibility, such Hereditary Member shall become an Active Member by heredity, and shall be transferred to the active list, with all its rights and privileges.

Section 3. HONORARY MEMBERS: All members of the foreign diplomatic corps present on duty in Peking at any time during the period from June 15 to December 31, 1900, all military and naval commissioned officers of other services than that of the United States present in North China, or in the Gulf of Pechili, and engaged in the military operations thereat, between the dates above specified, may become Honorary Members upon application as hereinafter provided.

Honorary Members will be charged no initiation fees or dues; they will not be entitled to hold office, except as hereinafter provided, nor to vote.

Section 4. HONORARY HEREDITARY MEMBERS: Male descendants of twenty-one years of age or over, of those eligible to Honorary Membership," may become Honorary Hereditary Members upon election by the Executive Committee as hereinafter provided.

Honorary Hereditary Members will be charged no initiation fees or dues; they will not be entitled to hold office, except as hereinafter provided, nor to vote.

Article IV. The Active Officers of the Order shall be elected from the Active or Hereditary Members and shall consist of: A President, a. First Vice-President, a Second Vice-President, a Secretary, who shall also be Treasurer, a Registrar, an Executive Committee, to consist of the President, ex officio, the Secretary, ex officio, and seven other Members.

Section 2. From among the Honorary Members the President may appoint an Honorary Vice-President for each nation represented in the membership, who shall hold office while he remains a member of the Order, unless he shall sooner resign said office.

Section 3. From among the Honorary Members, the President may appoint an Honorary Secretary for each nation represented in the membership, who shall hold office while he remains a member of the Order, unless he shall sooner resign said office.

Article V. The Active Officers shall be elected at the date of the annual meeting and shall hold office for two years. Upon the occurrence of a vacancy the President shall fill the same for the unexpired term.

Article VI. YAMENS: Washington, D. C, shall be the seat of the Chief Yamen of the Order. An annual meeting shall be held on the second Monday in June of each year at the Chief Yamen or at such subordinate Yamen as the Executive Committee may designate.

Article VII. The Executive Committee shall meet on the second Monday in December and June each year. A special meeting may be called by the President or by any three members of the Executive Committee. A majority of the Executive Committee, or the President and two other members, shall constitute a quorum for the transaction of all business.

Article VIII. The Executive Committee shall authorize all expenditures and audit the accounts of the Treasurer, conduct the affairs of the Order and make suitable By-Laws. The By-Laws shall define the duties of the Officers, provide methods for the election of Officers, Hereditary and Honorary Hereditary Members, fix the amount of the annual dues and establish such other rules as may be necessary to properly conduct the business of the Order. The Executive Committee shall also provide appropriate regulations for such forms and ceremonies as may be deemed suitable at the annual meeting, and special meetings of the Order. It shall provide a suitable certificate of membership and an official seal.

Article IX. The Executive Committee shall adopt a suitable insignia and lapel button which shall be the same for all classes and each member shall be entitled to wear the same, under such rules as may be prescribed by the Executive Committee.

Article X. Application for membership shall be submitted to the Secretary. Satisfactory proofs of eligibility of the applicant must be furnished with the application. Applications for Hereditary and Honorary Hereditary membership shall be submitted to the Executive Committed for action. A single negative vote by any member of the Executive Committee upon an application for membership shall be sufficient for rejection.

Article XI. On and after October first, nineteen hundred and four, the initiation fee for Active Members shall be three dollars and there shall be added to this amount two dollars for each full year that has elapsed since the organization of the Order, on October first, nineteen hundred. The initiation fee for Hereditary Members shall be three dollars.

Article XII. A member may be dropped from the rolls by the Executive Committee, for non-payment of dues when the same remain unpaid for the period of one year. Any member, so dropped, shall be reinstated only upon payment of all arrears and upon action of the Executive Committee.

Article XIII. Section 1. A member may be expelled upon a twothirds vote of all the voting members of the Order.

Section 2. A member, whether Active or Hereditary, shall be dropped from the rolls by the Executive Committee, who shall be shown in orders or correspondence published by the proper Executive Department, to have deserted the service of the Army, Navy, or Marine Corps, or who has been dismissed from such service by sentence of court-martial, or who has been allowed to resign for the good of the service.

Article XIV. This constitution may be changed by a two-thirds vote of the voting membership of the Order, not less than six months' notice having been previously given to the members of the proposed amendment.

== Officers of the Order ==
1900

President, Major-General Adna R. Chaffee, United States Volunteers.

First Vice-President, Captain Bowman H. McCalla, United States Navy.

Second Vice-President, Captain John T. Myers, United States Marine Corps.

Secretary and Treasurer, Captain Frank Dew Ramsey, Ninth United States Infantry.

Registrar, Captain Grote Hutchenson, Sixth United States Cavalry.

An executive committee was also elected.

1912

President, Lieutenant-general Adna R. Chaffee, U. S. A. (retired).

Vice-Presidents, Rear Admiral George C. Remey, U. S. N. (retired),

and

Colonel William P. Biddle, U. S. M. C.

Registrar, Lieutenant-colonel George Richards, U. S. M. C.

Secretary and Treasurer, Captain Charles D. Rhodes, U. S. A.

Executive Committee,

(Two years.)

Rear Admiral Henry T. B. Harris, U. S. N. (retired).

Major-general Charles F. Humphrey, U. S. A. (retired).

Colonel Franklin J. Moses, U. S. M. C.

Major Andre W. Brewster, U. S. A.

(One year.)

Brigadier-general James B. Aleshire, U. S. A.

Captain Malin Craig, U. S. A.

Captain Louis M. Little, U. S. M. C.

1914

President—Lieut-Gen. Adna R. Chaffee, U. S. A.

Vice-Presidents—Rear-Admiral George C. Remey, U. S. N.; George Richards, U. S. Marine Corps,

Registrar—Major Henry Leonard, U. S. Marine Corps.

Secretary and Treasurer—Col. Henry O. S. Heistand, U. S. A., War Department, Washington, D. C.

1916

President, Secretary and Treasurer, Col. HOS Heistand, USA Army, Fort Myer, Va.

== Members ==
- Lieutenant John McCloy, USN

== See also ==
- China Relief Expedition Medal
- China Campaign Medal
- Military Order of the Carabao
