= Philip M. Bannon =

United States Marine Corps Brevet Medal recipient

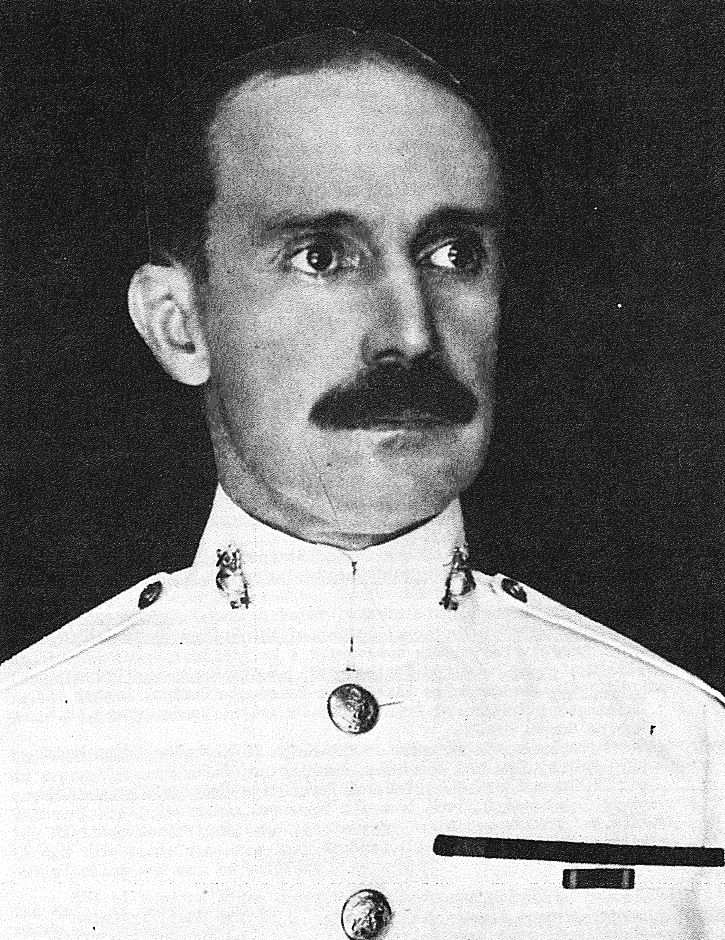
- Bannon in 1913
- Born: March 12, 1872; Jessup, Maryland, US
- Died: June 25, 1940 (aged 68)
- Military career
- Allegiance: United States
- Branch: United States Marine Corps
- Service years: 1895–1928
- Rank: Colonel
- Conflicts: Spanish–American War
- Awards: Marine Corps Brevet Medal

Philip Michael Bannon (March 12, 1872 – June 25, 1940) was a United States Marine Corps officer who received the Marine Corps Brevet Medal for his actions during the Spanish–American War.

Through his career he served in the Spanish–American War, the Boxer Rebellion in China, and during conflicts in the Caribbean and Central America through the Second Nicaraguan Campaign. He retired as a colonel in 1928.

== Biography ==
Bannon was born March 12, 1872, in Jessup, Maryland, and graduated from the United States Naval Academy in 1895. He accepted a commission in the United States Marine Corps on July 1, 1897, and was sent to the North Atlantic Squadron in April 1898 for his first assignment.

During the Battle of Guantanamo, Cuba, Bannon distinguished himself in combat and received a brevet promotion to first lieutenant effective June 13, 1898. It was for this action that he would later receive the Brevet Medal.

After Guantanamo, Bannon was assigned to the Philippines for a short time and was then ordered to China and participated in the Boxer Rebellion. Now at the rank of captain he led a company of Marines that marched into Tientsin to join other allied forces already there and received a commendation for gallantry from the Department of the Navy for his "gallant, meritorious, and courageous conduct on July 13, 1900"

After the Boxer rebellion Bannon was put in command of the Marine detachment aboard the USS Wabash and was then assigned to the prison ship Southery. In 1906 Bannon saw service in both Panama, where he led a battalion of Marines and in Cuba where he participated in the pacification of Cuba.

He retired as a colonel in 1928 and died at the Naval Hospital in San Diego, California June 25, 1940.

== Military decorations ==
Throughout his 33-year career Bannon received the following awards: Marine Corps Brevet Medal, Sampson Medal, Spanish Campaign Medal, Philippine Campaign Medal, China Relief Expedition Medal, Cuban Pacification Medal, Mexican Campaign Medal, Second Nicaraguan Campaign Medal, Marine Corps Expeditionary Medal, World War I Victory Medal, Military Order of the Carabao and the Military Order of the Dragon.

=== Marine Corps Brevet Medal citation ===
There were two different citations given, one from the President of the United States and another from the Secretary of the Navy.

==== Presidential citation ====
Citation:

The President of the United States takes pleasure in presenting the Marine Corps Brevet Medal to Philip Michael Bannon, Second Lieutenant, U.S. Marine Corps, for distinguished service in battle at Guantanamo, Cuba. On 10 August 1898 appointed First Lieutenant, by brevet, to take rank from 13 June 1898.

==== Secretary of the Navy citation ====
Citation

The Secretary of the Navy takes pleasure in transmitting to Second Lieutenant Philip Michael Bannon, United States Marine Corps, the Brevet Medal which is awarded in accordance with Marine Corps Order No. 26 (1921), for distinguished service in battle while serving with Company C, First Marine (Huntington's) Battalion, at Guantanamo, Cuba, on 13 June 1898. On 10 August 1898, Second Lieutenant Bannon is appointed First Lieutenant, by brevet, to take rank from 13 June 1898.
