= Wendell Cushing Neville =

US Marine Corps general and Medal of Honor recipient (1870–1930)

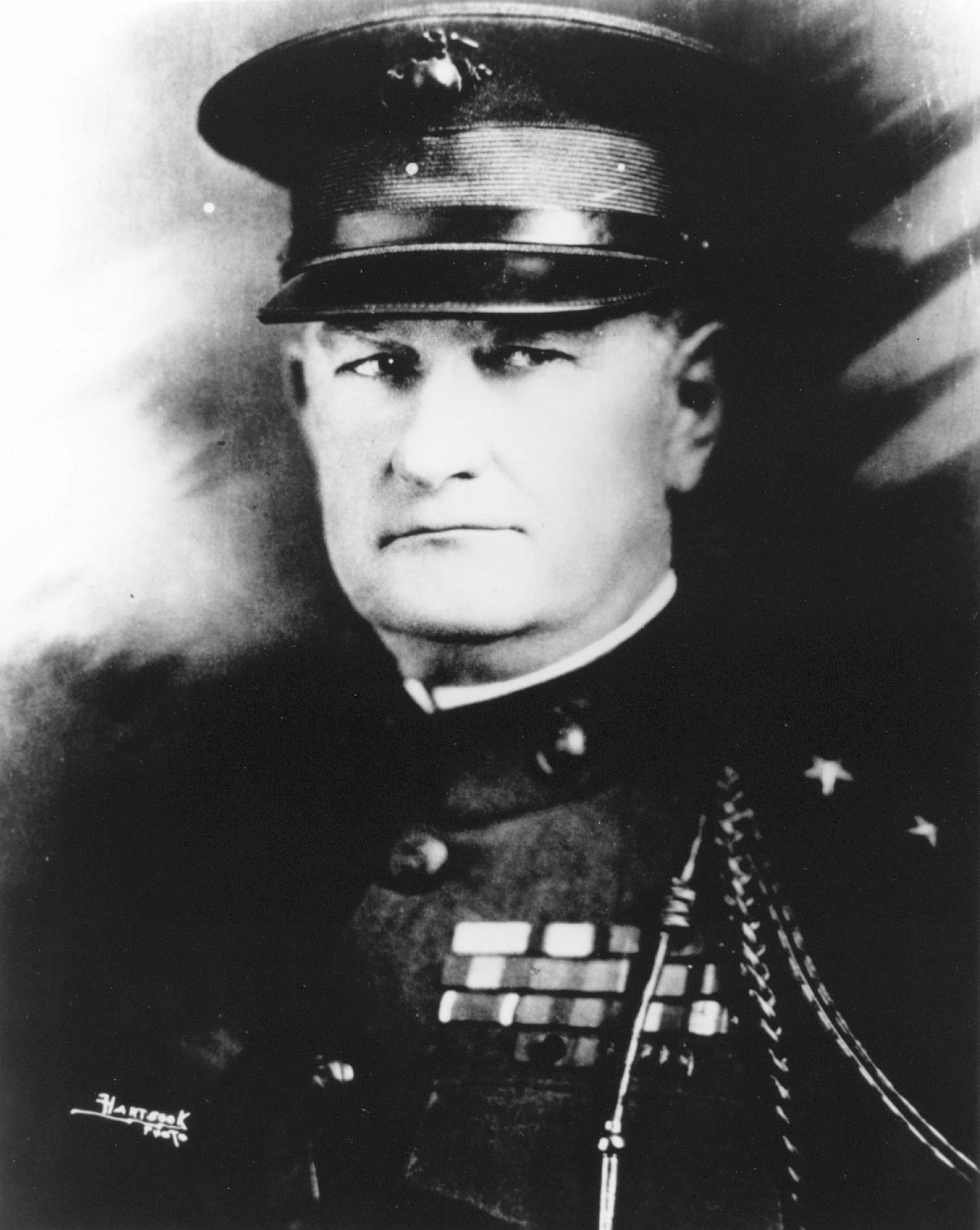
- 14th Commandant of the Marine Corps (1929–1930)
- Born: May 12, 1870; Portsmouth, Virginia, U.S.
- Died: July 8, 1930 (aged 60); Edgewater Beach, Maryland, U.S.
- Burial place: Arlington National Cemetery
- Military career
- Allegiance: United States
- Branch: Marine Corps
- Service years: 1890–1930
- Rank: Major general
- Nickname: "Buck"
- Commands: Commandant of the Marine Corps; Department of the Pacific
- Conflicts: Spanish–American War: Battle of Guantanamo Bay; Boxer Rebellion: China Relief Expedition; Mexican Revolution: Battle of Veracruz; Banana Wars: Occupation of Nicaragua; World War I: Battle of Belleau Wood
- Awards: Medal of Honor; Distinguished Service Medal (2); Brevet Medal; Legion of Honor; Croix de Guerre

Wendell Cushing Neville (May 12, 1870 – July 8, 1930) was a major general of the Marine Corps as well as a Medal of Honor recipient and the 14th Commandant of the Marine Corps between 1929 and 1930.

== Military career ==
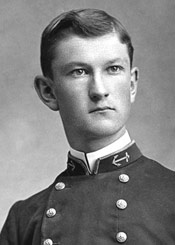
Midshipman Wendell C. Neville, U.S. Naval Academy

Neville was born in Portsmouth, Virginia and later entered the Naval Academy at Annapolis, Maryland, in 1886 chiefly because no one else in his district desired an appointment to Annapolis that year. After graduating in 1890 and following a two-year cruise aboard a warship, which was the practice of the era, was commissioned a Marine Corps second lieutenant.

At the outbreak of the Spanish–American War, 2nd Lt. Neville was assigned to the 1st Battalion, hurriedly organized under Lieutenant Colonel Robert W. Huntington for service in Cuba. The battalion staged a daring attack under heavy gunfire at Guantanamo Bay, established a beachhead and routed enemy forces in that area. For outstanding valor and leadership in that action, Lt. Neville was brevetted a captain in the Marine Corps on June 13, 1898. He was later awarded the Brevet Medal, following its creation in 1921.

Promoted to the permanent rank of captain a few months after the war, Neville was assigned to a battalion of Marines ordered to China to relieve the hard-pressed garrison at Peking during the Boxer Rebellion. He took part in four battles in that area and was again commended for his gallantry.

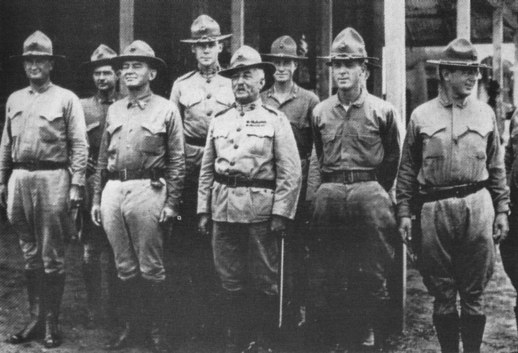
The senior officers of the 1st Marine Brigade photographed at Veracruz in 1914. Front row, left to right: Lt. Col. Wendell C. Neville; Col. John A. Lejeune; Col. Littleton W. T. Waller, Commanding; and Maj. Smedley Butler.

In the Philippine Islands not long afterwards, he was appointed military governor of Basilan Province. Following that assignment he served in Cuba, Nicaragua, Panama and Hawaii.

During the United States occupation of Veracruz, he was in command of the 2nd Advance Base Regiment. While in command of Marines landing at Veracruz, Mexico, on April 21, 1914, he displayed conspicuous gallantry. Lieutenant Colonel Neville was awarded the Medal of Honor for his distinguished conduct during the Vera Cruz intervention. He, Major General Smedley D. Butler and Major General David Dixon Porter were the only individuals to be awarded both the Medal of Honor and the Brevet Medal.

In 1915, Neville returned to China where he was chosen to command the combined Allied guard at Peking, serving in that position until 1917. He was promoted to colonel in August 1916.

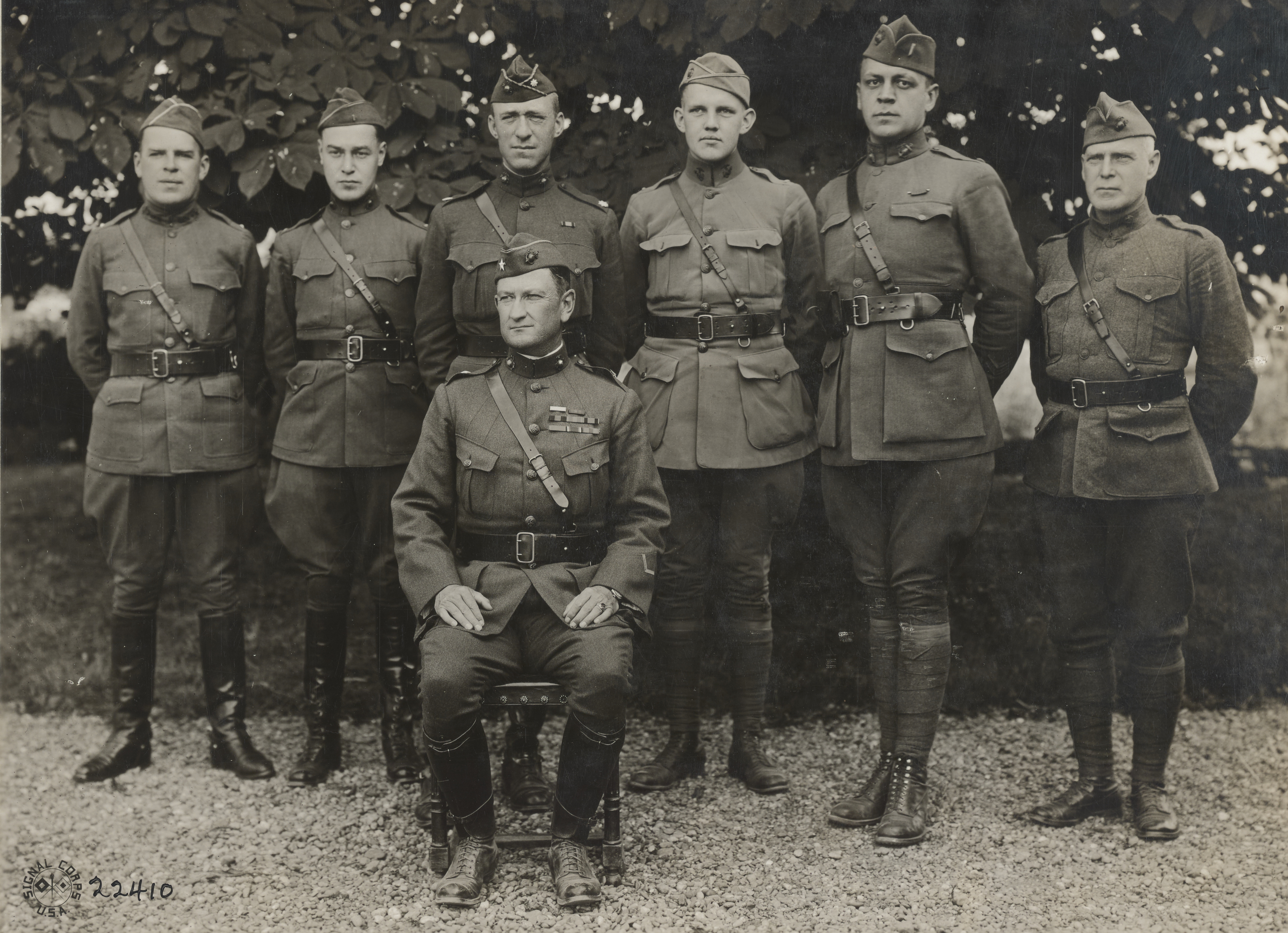
Neville, together with members of his brigade staff, France, August 1918.

On January 1, 1918, almost nine months after the American entry into World War I, he was placed in command of the 5th Marine Regiment in France, succeeding Hiram I. Bearss. The 5th Marines, together with the 6th Marine Regiment, formed part of the 4th Marine Brigade. In May he moved his regiment into action at Belleau Wood where Germany's big drive was decisively halted. In July, after handing over the 5th Marines to Logan Feland, Neville's command was enlarged to include the 4th Marine Brigade, taking over from James Harbord, which he directed during the remaining days of the war and during its occupation service in Germany. He was promoted to brigadier general in 1918.

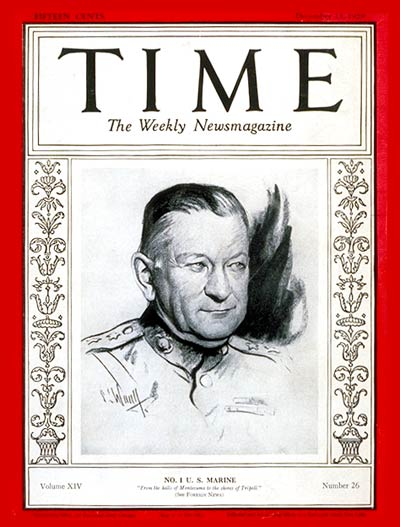
On the cover of Time in 1929

After service with the Army of Occupation in Germany, Brig. Gen. Neville and his brigade returned to the United States in July 1919. Promoted to major general in August 1920, he served as assistant to the commandant of the Marine Corps and later became commanding general, Fleet Marine Force with headquarters in San Francisco. He also commanded the Marine Barracks, Quantico, Virginia.

Maj. Gen. Neville succeeded Maj. Gen. John A. Lejeune as Commandant of the Marine Corps on March 5, 1929. Maj. Gen. Neville's sudden death on July 8, 1930, at Edgewater Beach, Maryland, while in office as commandant, closed one of the most brilliant military careers of his day. General Butler lamented the death of "my dear old friend," labeling Lejeune, Neville, and himself "the three musketeers of the Marines."

He was buried at Arlington National Cemetery, in Arlington, Virginia.

== Awards and honors ==
During the 38 years he spent as a U.S. Marine, Major General Neville received five citations, as well as:

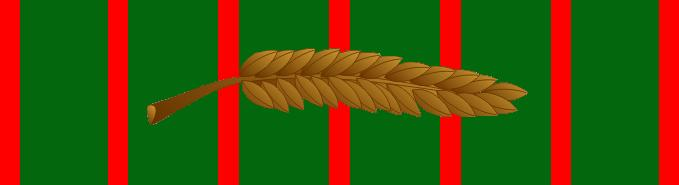

	Medal of Honor	Marine Corps Brevet Medal		French Fourragère
Navy Distinguished Service Medal	Army Distinguished Service Medal	China Relief Expedition Medal	Spanish Campaign Medal	French Fourragère
Spanish War Service Medal	Philippine Campaign Medal	Nicaraguan Campaign Medal (1912)	Mexican Service Medal	French Fourragère
World War I Victory Medal w/ 5 stars	Army of Occupation of Germany Medal	Légion d'honneur, Grand Cross	Croix de guerre w/ 3 palms and 2 stars	French Fourragère

USS Neville (APA-9), a Heywood-class United States Navy transport, was named in honor of Major General Neville.

=== Medal of Honor citation ===
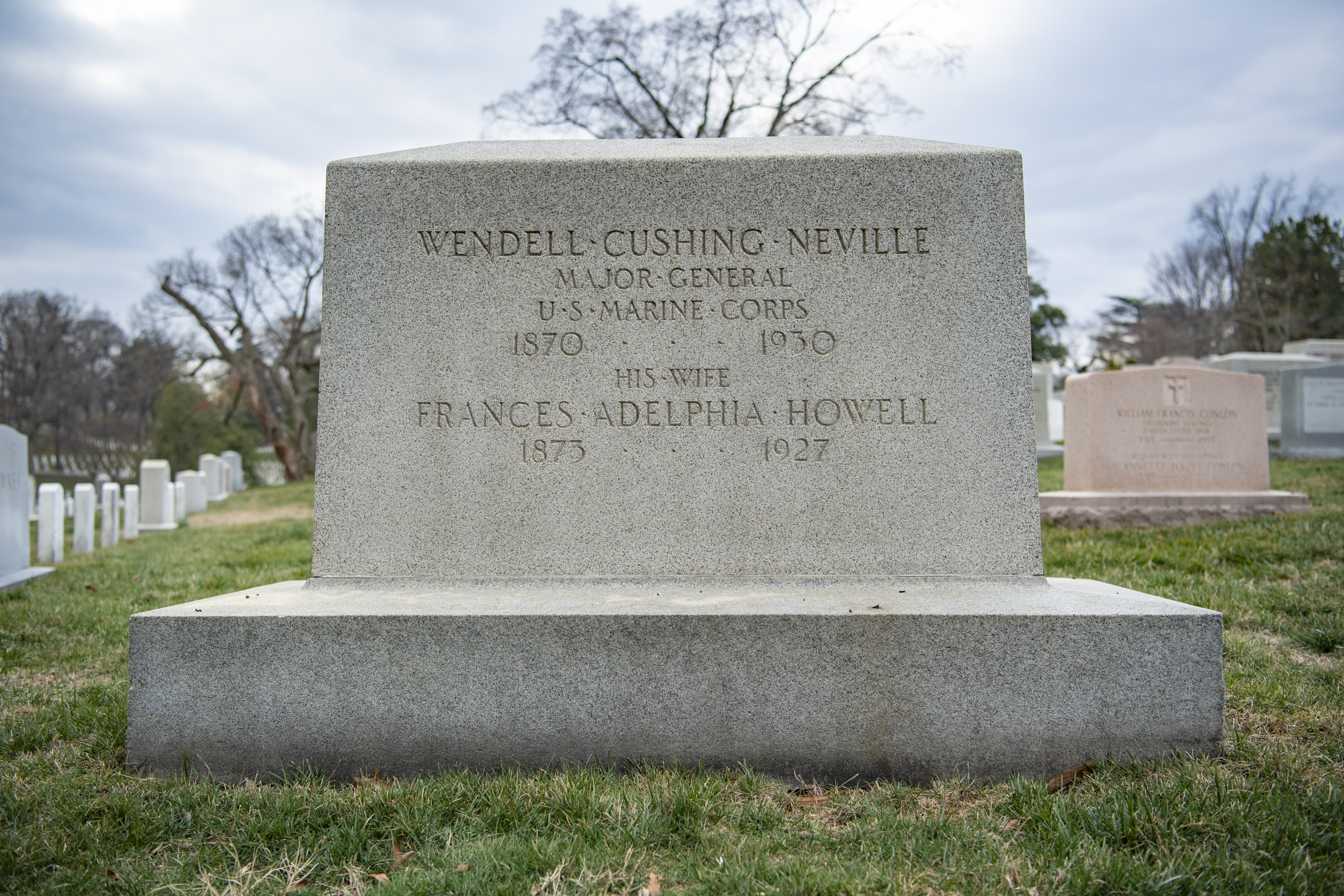
Grave at Arlington National Cemetery

NEVILLE, Wendell Cushing
Lieutenant Colonel, U.S. Marine Corps
G.O. Navy Department, No. 177
December 4, 1915

Citation:

For distinguished conduct in battle engagements of Vera Cruz 21 and April 22, 1914. In command of the Second Regiment Marines, Lieutenant Colonel Neville was in both days' fighting and almost continually under fire from soon after landing, about noon on the 21st, until we were in possession of the city, about noon of the 22d. His duties required him to be at points of great danger in directing his officers and men, and he exhibited conspicuous courage, coolness and skill in his conduct of the fighting. Upon his courage and skill depended, in great measure, success or failure. His responsibilities were great and he met them in a manner worthy of commendation.

== See also ==
- List of Medal of Honor recipients (Veracruz)

== Sources ==
- United States Marine Corps History Division. "Major General Wendell C. Neville". Who's Who in Marine Corps History. United States Marine Corps. Archived from the original on 2011-06-15.
- Allan Reed Millett; Jack Shulimson, eds. (2004). Commandants of the Marine Corps. Annapolis, Maryland: Naval Institute Press. pp. 214–223. ISBN 978-0-87021-012-9.
- Zabecki, David T.; Mastriano, Douglas V., eds. (2020). Pershing's Lieutenants: American Military Leadership in World War I. New York, NY: Osprey Publishing. ISBN 978-1-4728-3863-6.
- Lelle, SgtMaj John E. (1988). The Brevet Medal. Quest Publishing Co. ISBN 0-915779-02-1.
- "Marine Corps Officers: 1798 to 1900". Naval Historical Center. 2006-04-06. Archived from the original on June 23, 2006.
- Edward S. Haynes (May 1972). "The United States Marine Corps Brevet Medal and Its Recipients". The Collector. 23 (5).
- "LtCol Wendell Cushing Neville, Medal of Honor, 1914, 2d Reg Marines, Vera Cruz". Medal of Honor recipient. United States Marine Corps.

Military offices
Preceded by Maj. Gen. John A. Lejeune	Commandant of the United States Marine Corps; 1929–1930	Succeeded by Maj. Gen. Ben Hebard Fuller
