= Charles G. Long =

United States Marine Corps general

Charles Grant Long
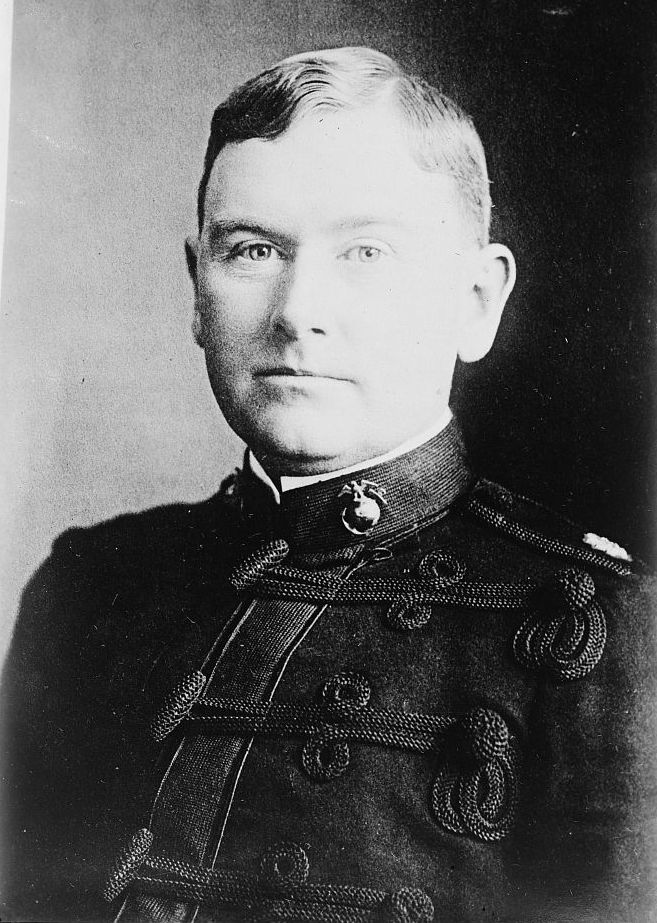
- Long in 1918
- Born: December 14, 1869; South Weymouth, Massachusetts, U.S.
- Died: March 5, 1943 (aged 73); South Dartmouth, Massachusetts, U.S.
- Burial place: Arlington National Cemetery
- Relatives: Richard H. Long, brother
- Military career
- Allegiance: United States of America
- Branch: United States Marine Corps
- Service years: 1891–1921
- Rank: Major General
- Conflicts: Philippine–American War; Spanish–American War; Boxer Rebellion; World War I
- Awards: Marine Corps Brevet Medal; Navy Cross

Major General Charles Grant Long (December 14, 1869 – March 5, 1943) was the third assistant Commandant of the Marine Corps. He was also a recipient of the Marine Corps Brevet Medal and Navy Cross.

== Biography ==
Charles Long was born December 14, 1869, in South Weymouth, Massachusetts. He graduated from the United States Naval Academy in 1891 and received a commission as a second lieutenant on July 1, 1891.

He retired from the Marine Corps in December 1921 after 30 years of service and died March 5, 1943, at South Dartmouth, Massachusetts.

== Awards ==
Long's awards and decorations include:

1st Row	Marine Corps Brevet Medal		Navy Cross	West Indies Naval Campaign Medal
2nd Row	Spanish Campaign Medal	Philippine Campaign Medal	China Relief Expedition Medal	Nicaraguan Campaign Medal (1912)
3rd Row	Mexican Service Medal	Haitian Campaign Medal	Marine Corps Expeditionary Medal with two service stars	World War I Victory Medal
