= James Mahoney =

James Mahoney may refer to:

- James Mahony (1810–1879), Irish artist and engraver
- James Mahoney (politician) (1873–1938), British priest and politician
- James Mahoney (pulmonologist) (1958–2020), American pulmonologist and internist
- James Patrick Mahoney (New York bishop) (1925–2002), American bishop
- James Patrick Mahoney (1927–1995), Canadian bishop
- James E. Mahoney (1858–1926), United States Marine Corps officer
