= Lewis C. Lucas =

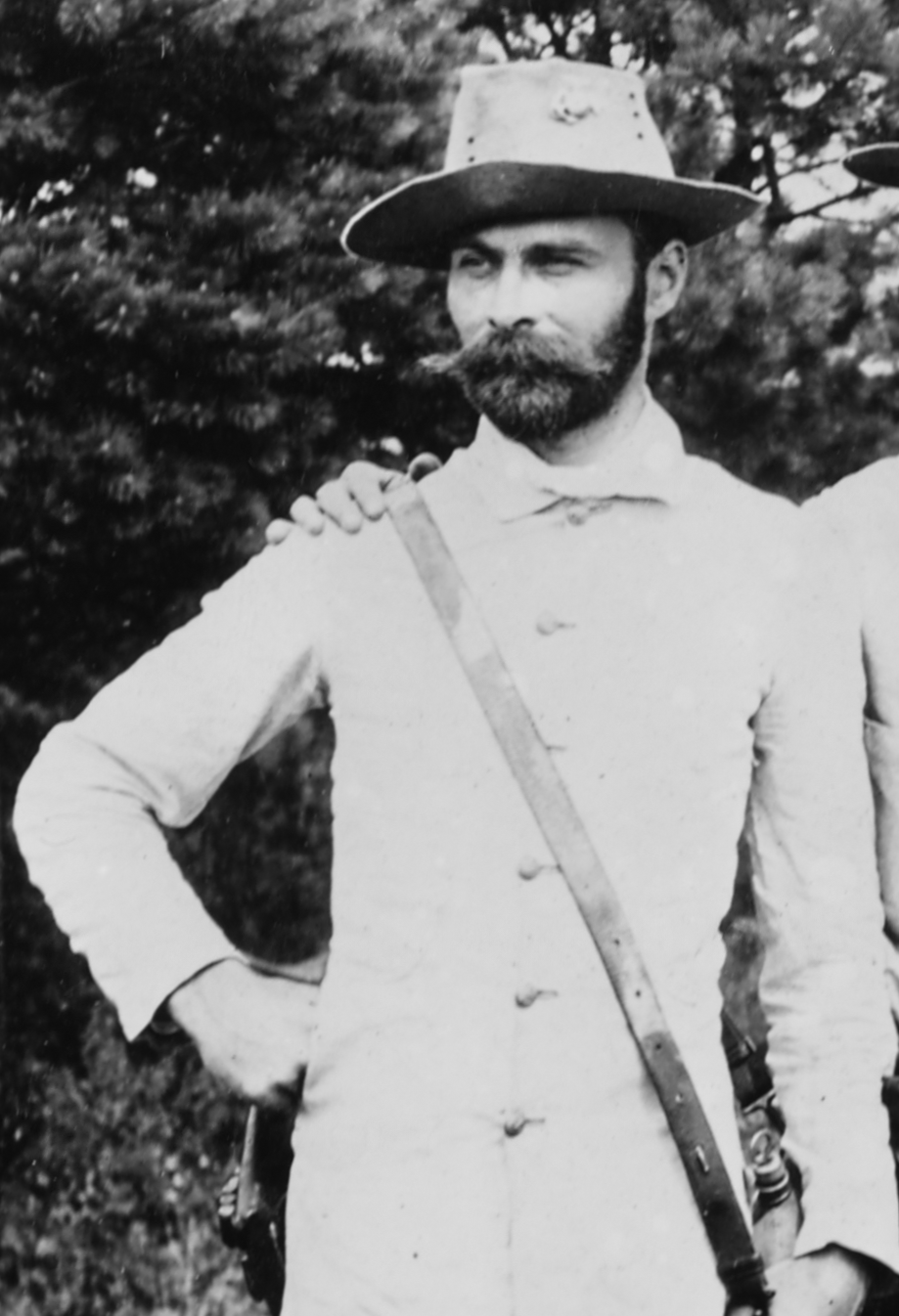
- Lewis in 1898
- Born: November 3, 1867; Marietta, Ohio, U.S.
- Died: March 6, 1939 (aged 71)
- Burial place: Arlington National Cemetery
- Military career
- Allegiance: United States
- Branch: United States Marine Corps
- Service years: 1889–1915; 1918–1932
- Rank: Lieutenant Colonel
- Conflicts: Spanish–American War
- Awards: Marine Corps Brevet Medal

Lewis Clark Lucas (November 3, 1867 – March 6, 1939) was an American officer serving in the United States Marine Corps during the Spanish–American War who was one of 23 Marine Corps officers approved to receive the Marine Corps Brevet Medal for bravery. He graduated from the US Naval Academy in 1889, and was commissioned in the Marine Corps in 1891.

== Presidential citation ==
Citation

The President of the United States takes pleasure in presenting the Marine Corps Brevet Medal to Lewis Clarke Lucas, First Lieutenant, U.S. Marine Corps, for conspicuous conduce in battle at Guantanamo, Cuba, 13 June 1898. On 10 August 1898, appointed Captain, by brevet.
