= John C. Kelton =

United States Army general and administrator (1828–93)

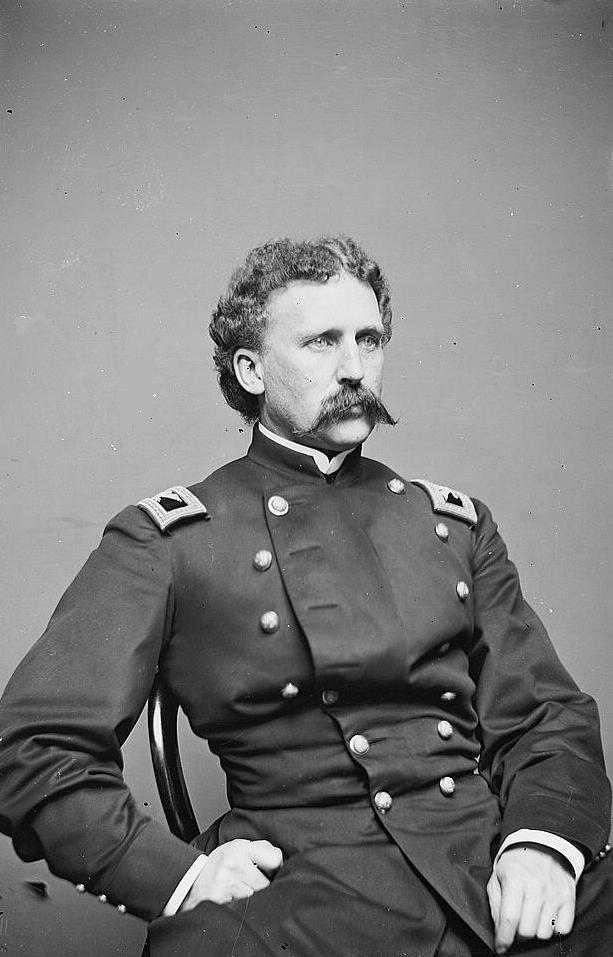
- Kelton, 1860–70
- Born: June 24, 1828; Delaware County, Pennsylvania, US
- Died: July 15, 1893 (aged 65); Washington, D.C., US
- Burial place: United States Soldiers' and Airmen's Home National Cemetery
- Relatives: Allan C. Kelton (brother)
- Military career
- Allegiance: United States of America; Union
- Branch: United States Army; Union Army
- Service years: 1851–1892
- Rank: Brigadier General
- Commands: Adjutant General of the U.S. Army
- Conflicts: American Civil War; Siege of Corinth

John Cunningham Kelton (June 24, 1828 – July 15, 1893) was an American military officer who was Adjutant General of the United States Army from 1889 to 1892.

== Biography ==
Kelton was born in Delaware County, Pennsylvania and graduated from the United States Military Academy in 1851. He was appointed to the 6th Infantry and stationed at the northwestern frontier. In 1855, he was transferred to Jefferson Barracks, Missouri, where he was made 1st lieutenant. He was appointed assistant instructor of infantry tactics at West Point in 1857 and again in 1859. When the American Civil War began, Kelton was made Chief Purchasing Commissary at St. Louis for supplying troops in the West. He then served as Assistant Adjutant General of the Department of the West with the rank of captain. In the fall of 1861, Kelton was commissioned Colonel of the 9th Missouri Volunteers. He resigned his volunteer commission on March 12, 1862, and in turn served as Assistant Adjutant General of the Department of Mississippi in 1862. Here he served on the field during the Siege of Corinth. Kelton was promoted to brevet colonel and again to brevet brigadier for his valuable services during the war.

Kelton was appointed to the Adjutant General's Department in April 1865 and was promoted to lieutenant colonel in March 1866. He was appointed as adjutant general of the Division of the Pacific in July 1870, where he remained until September 1885, earning a promotion to colonel in June 1880. In October 1885 he returned to the Adjutant General's Department in Washington, and he was appointed Adjutant General of the U. S. Army with the rank of brigadier general in June 1889. He retired in June 1892.

After retirement, he was appointed as governor of the Soldier's Home in Washington, where he served until his death in July 1893. He is buried in the cemetery there, now known as the United States Soldiers' and Airmen's Home National Cemetery.

== See also ==
- List of Adjutant Generals of the U.S. Army

Military offices
Preceded by Richard C. Drum	Adjutant General of the U. S. Army; June 7, 1889-June 24, 1892	Succeeded by Robert Williams
