= William N. McKelvy Sr. =

William Nessler McKelvy Sr.
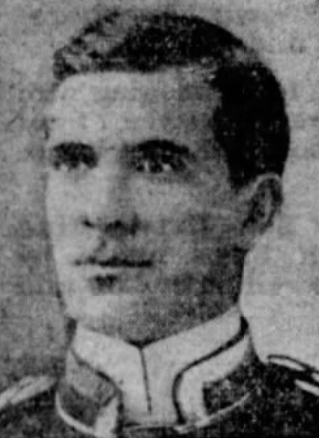
- Born: 15 July 1869; Allegheny, Pennsylvania, US
- Died: 22 September 1933 (aged 64)
- Burial place: Arlington National Cemetery
- Military career
- Allegiance: United States of America
- Branch: United States Marine Corps
- Service years: 1891 - 1925
- Rank: Colonel
- Conflicts: Spanish–American War
- Awards: Marine Corps Brevet Medal

William Nessler McKelvy Sr. (July 15, 1869 – September 22, 1933) was an American officer born in Allegheny, Pennsylvania and serving in the United States Marine Corps during the Spanish–American War who was one of 23 Marine Corps officers approved to receive the Marine Corps Brevet Medal for bravery. He graduated from the US Naval Academy in 1891, and was commissioned in the Marine Corps in 1893.

== Presidential citation ==
Citation:

The President of the United States takes pleasure in presenting the Marine Corps Brevet Medal to William Nessler McKelvy Sr., First Lieutenant, U.S. Marine Corps, for distinguished conduct and public service in the presence of the enemy at Guantanamo, Cuba, 11 June 1898. On 18 March 1901, appointed Captain by brevet.

== Secretary of the Navy citation ==
Citation

The Secretary of the Navy takes pleasure in transmitting to First Lieutenant William Nessler McKelvy Sr., United States Marine Corps, the Brevet Medal which is awarded in accordance with Marine Corps Order No. 26 (1921), for distinguished conduct and public service in the presence of the enemy while serving with Artillery Battery, First Marine (Huntington's) Battalion, at Guantanamo, Cuba, on 11 June 1898. On 18 March 1901, First Lieutenant McKelvy, is appointed Captain, by brevet, to take rank from 11 June 1898.
