= Carl Gamborg-Andresen =

Norwegian-born American military officer

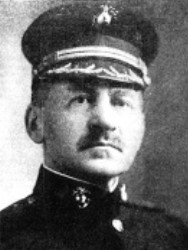
- Born: March 10, 1866; Norway
- Died: March 4, 1936 (aged 69)
- Military career
- Allegiance: United States of America
- Branch: United States Marine Corps
- Rank: Colonel
- Conflicts: Boxer Rebellion
- Awards: Marine Corps Brevet Medal

Carl Gamborg-Andresen (March 10, 1866 – March 4, 1936) was a Norwegian-born American military officer serving in the United States Marine Corps during the Boxer Rebellion who was one of 23 Marine Corps officers approved to receive the Marine Corps Brevet Medal for bravery.

Carl Gamborg-Andresen was born in Norway and emigrated to the United States. In 1904 he married Constance Janette Stowell (1883–1943) in Sitka, Alaska. He retired as a colonel in the United States Marine Corps during 1925, with more than 30 years of service. He died in 1936 in Seattle, Washington, and was buried at Arlington National Cemetery.

== Presidential citation ==
Citation

The President of the United States takes pleasure in presenting the Marine Corps Brevet Medal to Carl Gamborg-Andresen, First Lieutenant, U.S. Marine Corps, for distinguished conduct and public service in the presence of the enemy near Tientsin, China, 13 July 1900. On 28 March 1901, appointed Captain, by brevet.
