= Paul St. Clair Murphy =

United States Marine Corps officer (1850–1931)

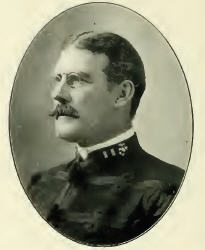
- Paul St. Clair Murphy
- Born: July 7, 1850; New York City, New York
- Died: November 9, 1931 (aged 81); Brooklyn, New York
- Burial place: Evergreen Cemetery Brooklyn, New York
- Military career
- Allegiance: United States of America
- Branch: United States Marine Corps
- Service years: 1873–1910, 1917–1920
- Rank: Colonel
- Conflicts: Spanish–American War; World War I
- Awards: Marine Corps Brevet Medal

Paul St. Clair Murphy (July 7, 1850 – November 9, 1931) was an American officer serving in the United States Marine Corps during the Spanish–American War. He was one of 23 men to be awarded the Marine Corps Brevet Medal.

== Biography ==
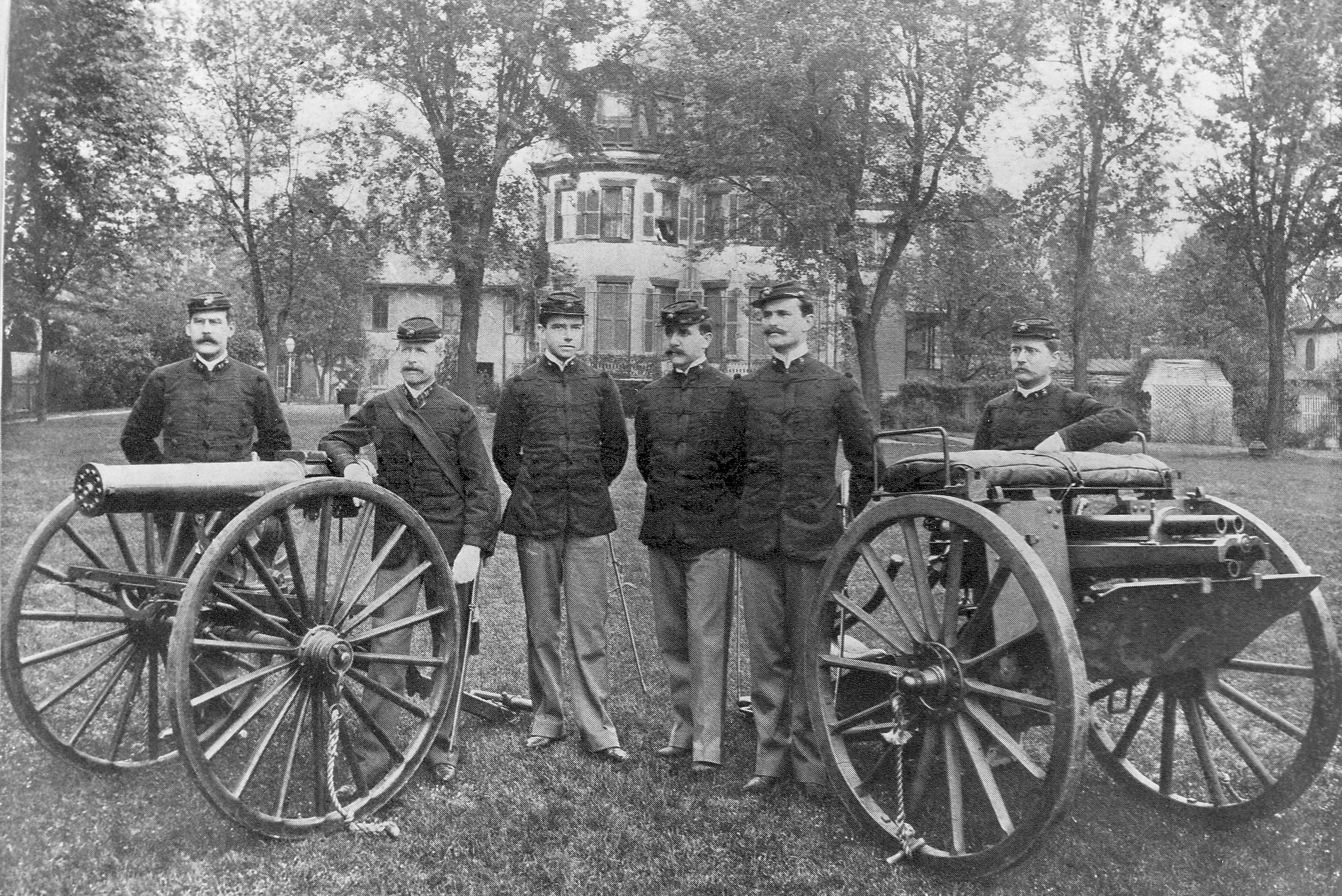
USMC Officers stationed at Marine Barracks, Washington D.C. in 1896. Then Captain Murphy is on the far left.

Murphy was born July 7, 1850, in New York City, New York.

He joined the United States Marine Corps in 1873 and fought in several wars, including the Spanish–American War and World War I. In 1893 he commanded the Marine detachment that guarded the exhibits for the World's Columbian Exposition in Chicago, Illinois. The naval exhibit contained items that were loaned by the United States Department of State and other foreign governments for display.

In 1894 Commandant of the Marine Corps Colonel Heywood appointed Captain Murphy to lead the Marine Corps School of Application. Murphy started this assignment March 8, 1894 and on May 3, 1894, the school graduated its third class of officers and second class of noncommissioned officers.

On October 10, 1910, he retired as a colonel on his own request, but returned to active duty from April 1917 to June 1920 during World War I.

He died November 9, 1931, in Brooklyn, New York, and is buried in Evergreen Cemetery Brooklyn, New York.

== Marine Corps Brevet Medal citation ==
=== Secretary of the Navy citation ===
Citation

The Secretary of the Navy takes pleasure in transmitting to Captain Paul St. Clair Murphy, United States Marine Corps, the Brevet Medal which is awarded in accordance with Marine Corps Order No. 26 (1921), for gallant service as Fleet Marine Officer, North Atlantic Fleet, in the naval battle of Santiago, Cuba, on 3 July 1898. On 10 August 1898, Captain Murphy is appointed Major, by brevet, to rank from 3 July 1898.
