= Marine Corps Brevet Medal =

Military decoration of the United States Marine Corps

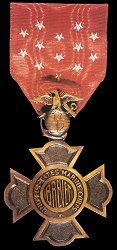
- The Marine Corps Brevet Medal
- Type: Military decoration
- Awarded for: Extreme gallantry and risk of life in actual combat with an armed enemy force
- Presented by: Department of the Navy
- Eligibility: Living Marine Corps officers who received brevet promotions
- Status: Obsolete
- Established: 1921
- First award: Retroactively for actions in 1863
- Final award: Retroactively for actions in 1900

Highlights
- Total: 23 approved 20 awarded (3 approved recipients died before award)
- Marine Corps Brevet Medal Ribbon

Precedence
- Next (higher): Medal of Honor
- Next (lower): Navy Cross

The Marine Corps Brevet Medal, also known as the Brevet Medal, was a military decoration of the United States Marine Corps; it was created in 1921 as a result of Marine Corps Order Number 26. The decoration was a one-time issuance and retroactively recognized living Marine Corps officers who had received a brevet rank. The similar practice of frocking continues in all six branches of the U.S. Armed Forces.

Brevet promotions were used by the United States military in some capacity from 1775 until they were discontinued in 1900. The Army was the only branch authorized to grant brevets until 1814, when the Marine Corps was granted the same privilege. Over 86 years, the Marine Corps awarded 121 brevet promotions to 100 Marine Corps officers. Captain Anthony Gale was the first to receive a brevet promotion in 1814, and John Twiggs Myers, who died in 1952, was the last surviving recipient.

In 1921, Commandant John A. Lejeune requested that a Marine Corps Brevet Medal be authorized. After it was approved and created, the decoration was given to the last 20 living Marine Corps officers who received brevet promotions.

== Brevet promotions ==
A brevet promotion, or brevet, is the advancement in rank without the advancement in either pay grade or position. Typically, a brevetted officer would be given the insignia of the brevetted rank but not the pay or formal authority. Brevet promotions were originally authorized for the United States Army in 1775 by the Second Continental Congress. In 1778, a resolution was passed stating brevets would only be authorized "..to officers in the line or in case of very eminent services...".

The Marine Corps would not receive the authorization from Congress for brevet promotions until 1814, stating "... That the President is hereby authorized to confer brevet rank on such officers of the Marine Corps as shall distinguish themselves by gallant actions and meritorious conduct or shall have served ten years in any one grade...".

In 1814 Anthony Gale became the first Marine to receive a brevet promotion when he was brevetted to Major, having been a Captain for ten years. By the time the practice of brevet promotions was discontinued in 1900, 121 brevet promotions were bestowed on 100 Marine Corps officers.

In the 19th and early 20th centuries, brevet promotions were common in the United States armed forces. New officers received brevet rank until authorized positions were made available, or they could be brevetted to fill higher positions for gallantry. During the American Civil War, most senior officers received a brevet promotion, particularly during the final months of the war.

Due to the establishment of the Medal of Honor and the change in rules allowing both officers and enlisted to receive it, the need for brevet promotions diminished. During the American Civil War, the Army used the issuing of brevet promotions to such a degree that Congress passed an act in 1869 that restricted the issuance of brevet promotions. The act established three requirements for awarding a brevet: "they could only be awarded in time of war and then only for distinguished conduct and public service in the presence of the enemy, and it also removed all privileges of command based upon brevet rank except as directed by the President."

In 1870 Congress passed a law stating that no officer could wear, nor be addressed by, their brevet rank making brevet promotions an honorary decoration only. Because of this new law the last nine brevet promotions awarded by the Marine Corps occurred during the Boxer Rebellion. On June 7, 1921, the Secretary of the Navy Edwin Denby approved then-Commandant John A. Lejeune's request for a medal denoting the holder of a brevet promotion to be issued. Marine Corps Order #26 was issued on June 27, 1921, authorizing the medal to be ordered and by November 10, 1921, the medals had been created. This decoration was justified on the grounds that, until 1915, Marine Corps officers were not eligible for the Medal of Honor.

In 1940 the Marine Corps declared the Brevet Medal obsolete; the medal was never issued again. The concept of brevet commissions was phased out of the United States military, and was replaced by temporary and field promotions, which were awarded more frequently than brevet ranks.

Award of the medal was approved for twenty-three men, three of whom died before they could receive this award. Of the twenty recipients, three were holders of both the Marine Corps Brevet Medal and the Medal of Honor.

== Description and symbolism ==
The Marine Corps Brevet Medal was considered to be the equivalent of the Navy Cross, thus in precedence it ranks just behind the Medal of Honor. Recipients of the medal had received field commissions as Marine Corps officers, under combat conditions, and had performed feats of distinction and gallant service. Initially, the Brevet Medal ranked behind the Navy Distinguished Service Medal and was issued to 23 active, retired, and discharged Marine Corps personnel.

The medal was designed by Sergeant Joseph Alfred Burnett and contained a ribbon, in USMC scarlet, closely resembling the blue-and-white starred pattern of the Medal of Honor. No attached devices for the Brevet Medal were authorized.

=== Front of medal ===
The medal consists of a bronze cross pattée, with the center of each arm extended in a semi-circular shape and in the center of the front is the word "BREVET", encircled by the words "UNITED STATES MARINE CORPS". A small five-pointed star, point-up, is at the bottom center of the circle formed by the inscription and a small Marine Corps insignia (eagle, globe and anchor) attaches the medal to its suspension ring.

=== Back of medal ===
The back of the medal is plain except for its center, which contains the inscription "FOR DISTINGUISHED CONDUCT" in a circle, and the words "IN PRESENCE OF ENEMY" in the center. The original medals were neither named nor numbered.

== Recipients ==
Image	Name	Rank brevetted to	Date of action	Place of action	Notes
	Philip M. Bannon	First Lieutenant	June 13, 1898	Guantánamo Bay, Cuba	"For distinguished conduct during the Spanish–American War"
An image of a white male in his military uniform with no hat on. Military style ribbons are clearly visible.	Smedley D. Butler	Captain	July 13, 1900	Tientsin, China	"For distinguished conduct and public service in the presence of the enemy July 13, 1900, during the Boxer Rebellion". One of three to receive both the Brevet Medal and the Medal of Honor. One of nineteen to receive the Medal of Honor twice.
	Carl Gamborg-Andresen	Captain	July 13, 1900	Tientsin, China	"For distinguished conduct and public service in the presence of the enemy during the Boxer Rebellion"
	Newt H. Hall	Major	August 14, 1900	Peking, China	"For distinguished conduct in the presence of the enemy during the Boxer Rebellion"
	Allan C. Kelton	Major	July 3, 1898	Guantánamo Bay, Cuba	"For distinguished conduct and public service in the presence of the enemy during the Spanish–American War"
	Charles G. Long	Captain	June 11, 1898	Guantánamo Bay, Cuba	"For distinguished conduct and public service in the presence of the enemy during the Spanish–American War"
	Lewis C. Lucas	Captain	June 13, 1898	Guantánamo Bay, Cuba	"For conspicuous conduct in battle during the Spanish–American War"
An image of a white male in his military uniform with no hat on. Military style ribbons are clearly visible.	James E. Mahoney	Captain	June 11, 1898	Guantánamo Bay, Cuba	"For distinguished conduct and public service in the presence of the enemy during the Spanish–American War"
An image of a white male in his military uniform with no hat on. Military style medals are clearly visible.	Charles L. McCawley	Major	June 11, 1898	Guantánamo Bay, Cuba	"For distinguished conduct and public service in the presence of the enemy during the Spanish–American War"
	William N. McKelvy Sr.	Captain	June 11, 1898	Guantánamo Bay, Cuba	"For distinguished conduct and public service in the presence of the enemy during the Spanish–American War"
Paul St. Clair Murphy	Paul St. Clair Murphy	Major	July 3, 1898	Santiago, Cuba	"For gallant service in the naval battle of Santiago, Cuba during the Spanish–American War"
an image of a white male in his military uniform with a hat on and a mustache. Military style ribbons are clearly visible.	John Twiggs Myers	Major	July 20, 1900	Peking, China	"For distinguished conduct in the presence of the enemy at the defense of the legations during the Boxer Rebellion"
an image of a white male in his military uniform with a hat on. Military style ribbons are clearly visible.	Wendell C. Neville	Captain	June 13, 1898	Guantánamo Bay, Cuba	"For conspicuous conduct in battle during the Spanish–American War". One of three to receive both the Brevet Medal and the Medal of Honor.
an image of a white male in his military uniform with no hat.	Percival C. Pope	Captain	September 8, 1863	Fort Sumter	"For gallant and meritorious service in the night attack upon Ft. Sumter during the Civil War"
an image of a white male in his military uniform with no hat. Military style ribbons are clearly visible.	David D. Porter	Captain	October 8, 1899	Novaleta, Philippine Islands	"For distinguished conduct and public service in the presence of the enemy during the Philippine Insurrection". One of three to both receive the Brevet Medal and the Medal of Honor.
	William G. Powell	Captain	June 21, 1900	Tientsin, China	"For distinguished conduct and public service in the presence of the enemy during the Boxer Rebellion"
	George Richards	Lieutenant Colonel	July 13, 1900	Tientsin, China	"For distinguished conduct in the presence of the enemy during the Boxer Rebellion"
	Melville J. Shaw	First Lieutenant	June 11, 1898	Guantánamo Bay, Cuba	"For distinguished conduct and public service in the presence of the enemy during the Spanish–American War"
	George C. Thorpe	Captain	October 8, 1899	Novaleta, Philippine Islands	"For distinguished conduct and public service in the presence of the enemy during the Philippine Insurrection"
	Littleton W.T. Waller	Lieutenant Colonel	July 13, 1900	Tientsin, China	"For distinguished conduct and public service in the presence of the enemy during the Boxer Rebellion" He is the only Marine to have been awarded both the Brevet Medal and the Navy Specially Meritorious Service Medal.

Approved recipients who died before award of the medal

Image	Name	Rank brevetted to	Date of action	Place of action	Notes
James Forney	James Forney	Captain; Major; Lieutenant Colonel	April 24, 1862; July 1864; March 15, 1870	Forts Jackson and St. Philip; Gunpowder Bridge; Formosa	"For gallant and meritorious services at the attack upon Forts Jackson and St. Philip" "For meritorious services in defeating a rebel raid at Gunpowder Bridge" "For gallant and meritorious services in the action with the savages at Formosa"
	Louis J. Magill	First Lieutenant; Captain	June 13, 1898	Guantánamo Bay, Cuba	"For good judgment and gallantry in battle at Guantanamo, Cuba"
	Albert S. McLemore	Captain	November 6, 1898	Guantánamo Bay, Cuba	for Distinguished Conduct

== See also ==
- Awards and decorations of the United States military
