= Melville J. Shaw =

American military officer (1872–1927)

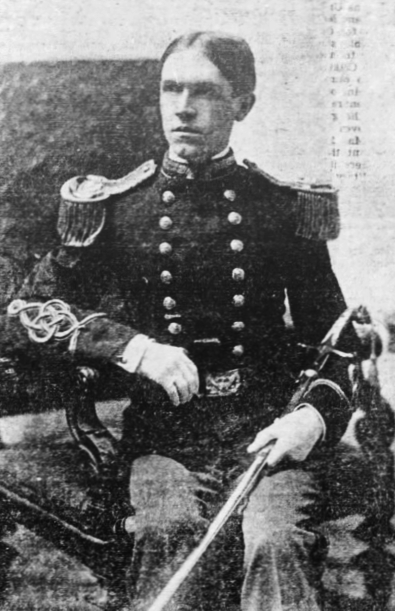
- Shaw c. 1898
- Born: August 6, 1872; Minnesota, U.S.
- Died: May 16, 1927 (aged 54); New York City, U.S.
- Burial place: Cypress Hills National Cemetery
- Military career
- Allegiance: United States of America
- Branch: United States Marine Corps
- Service years: 1894–1921
- Rank: Colonel
- Conflicts: Spanish–American War; Philippine–American War; World War I
- Awards: Marine Corps Brevet Medal

Melville James Shaw (August 6, 1872 – May 16, 1927) was an American officer born in Minnesota and serving in the United States Marine Corps during the Spanish–American War who was one of only 23 Marine Corps officers approved to receive the Marine Corps Brevet Medal for bravery.

== Biography ==
Shaw was the son of Captain George K. Shaw, USMC, who served during the American Civil War.

In 1894, Shaw graduated from the United States Naval Academy in Annapolis, Maryland.

On June 11, 1898, he served with Company D of the 1st Marine Battalion during the invasion of Guantanamo Bay, Cuba. He was recognized for gallantry in action and received a brevet (honorary promotion) to the rank of 1st lieutenant. In 1923, the Brevet Medal was created to recognize 23 surviving Marine Corps officers who had received brevets for valor.

He retired April 5, 1921, as a colonel after 30 years of service and died May 16, 1927, at the Naval Hospital at Brooklyn, New York.

Colonel Shaw was a hereditary member of the Military Order of the Loyal Legion of the United States, by right of his father's service in the Civil War.

== Presidential citation ==
Citation:

The President of the United States takes pleasure in presenting the Marine Corps Brevet Medal to Melville James Shaw, Second Lieutenant, U.S. Marine Corps, for distinguished conduct and public service in the presence of the enemy at Guantanamo, Cuba, 11 June 1898. On 18 March 1901, appointed a First Lieutenant, by brevet.

== Secretary of the Navy citation ==
Citation

The Secretary of the Navy takes pleasure in transmitting to Second Lieutenant Melville James Shaw, United States Marine Corps, the Brevet Medal which is awarded in accordance with Marine Corps Order No. 26 (1921), for distinguished conduct and public service in the presence of the enemy while serving with Company D, First Marine (Huntington's) Battalion, at Guantanamo, Cuba, on 11 June 1898. On 18 March 1901, Second Lieutenant Shaw is appointed First Lieutenant, by brevet, to take rank from 11 June 1898.
