= Allan C. Kelton =

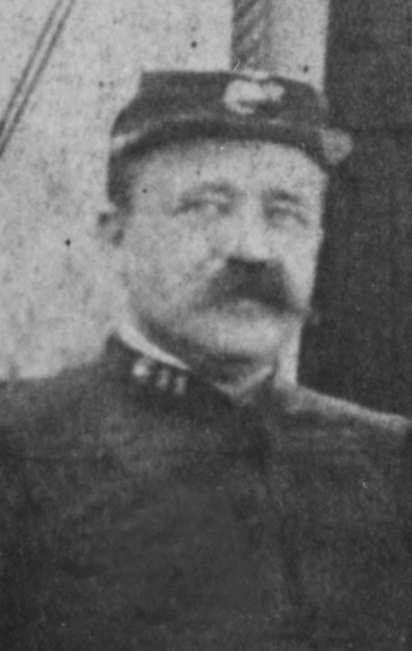
- Kelton c. 1898
- Born: June 24, 1846; Philadelphia, Pennsylvania
- Died: November 22, 1928 (aged 82)
- Relatives: John C. Kelton (brother)
- Military career
- Allegiance: United States of America
- Branch: United States Marine Corps
- Service years: 1869 – 1909
- Rank: Colonel
- Conflicts: Spanish–American War: Battle of Guantánamo Bay
- Awards: Marine Corps Brevet Medal

Allan Cunningham Kelton (June 24, 1846 – November 22, 1928) was an American officer serving in the United States Marine Corps during the Spanish–American War who was one of 23 Marine Corps officers approved to receive the Marine Corps Brevet Medal for bravery. He was commissioned in the Marine Corps in 1869.

== Presidential citation ==
Citation

The President of the United States takes pleasure in presenting the Marine Corps Brevet Medal to Allan Cunningham Kelton, Captain, U.S. Marine Corps, for distinguished conduct and public service in the presence of the enemy at Guantanamo, Cuba, 11 June 1898. On 18 March 1901, appointed Major, by brevet.
