= George Richards (USMC general) =

United States Marine Corps general

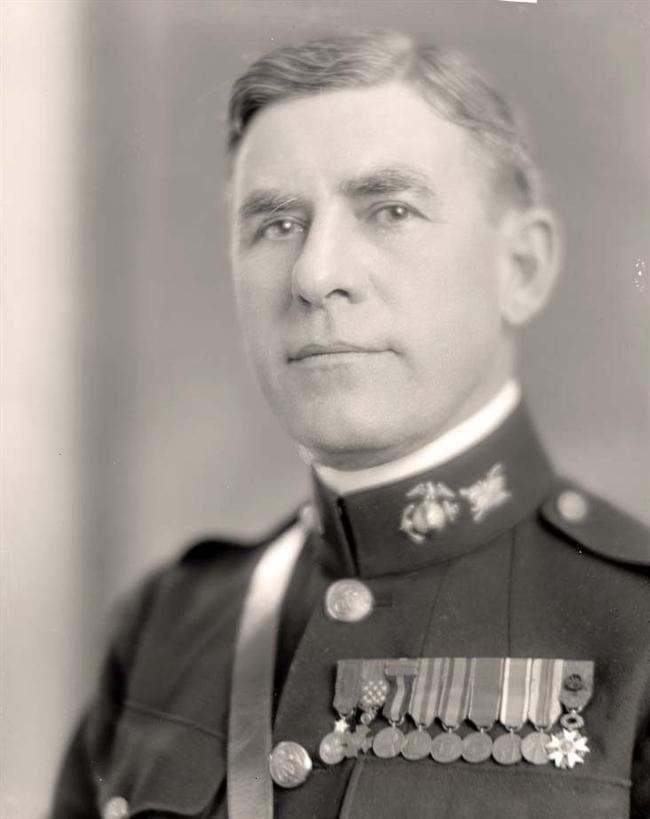
- Born: February 6, 1872; Ironton, Ohio, U.S.
- Died: January 9, 1948 (aged 75)
- Military career
- Allegiance: United States of America
- Branch: United States Marine Corps
- Service years: 1891–1936
- Rank: Major General
- Conflicts: Spanish–American War; Philippine–American War; Boxer Rebellion; World War I
- Awards: Marine Corps Brevet Medal; Navy Distinguished Service Medal

George Richards (February 6, 1872 – January 9, 1948) was an American officer born at Ironton, Ohio, and serving in the United States Marine Corps during the Boxer Rebellion. He was one of 23 Marine Corps officers approved to receive the Marine Corps Brevet Medal for bravery.

== Biography ==
He was born on February 6, 1872. In 1891 Richards graduated from the United States Naval Academy in Annapolis, Maryland. He retired March 1, 1936, as a Major General after over 40 years of service and died January 9, 1948.

== Awards ==
- Brevet Medal
- Distinguished Service Medal
- Sampson Medal
- Spanish Campaign Medal
- China Relief Expedition Medal
- Philippine Campaign Medal
- Cuban Pacification Medal
- World War I Victory Medal
- Officer, Legion of Honor (France)
