= Louis J. Magill =

American military officer

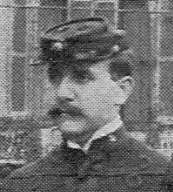
- Louis J. Magill (c1896)
- Born: January 31, 1871; Erie, Pennsylvania, U.S.
- Died: February 20, 1921 (aged 50)
- Burial place: West Laurel Hill Cemetery, Bala Cynwyd, Pennsylvania
- Military career
- Allegiance: United States
- Branch: United States Marine Corps
- Service years: 1893—1921
- Rank: Colonel
- Conflicts: Spanish–American War: Battle of Guantánamo Bay
- Awards: Marine Corps Brevet Medal

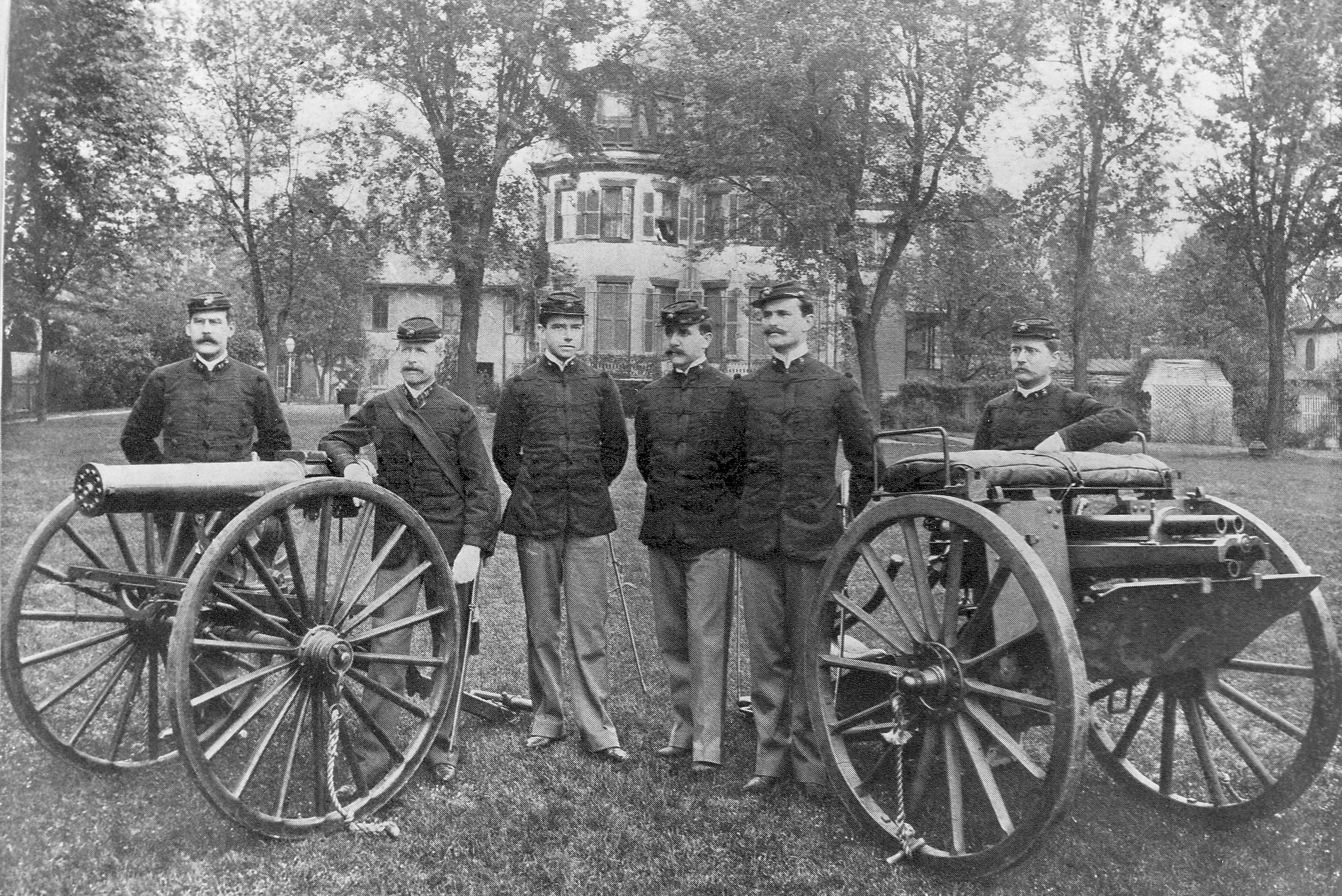
USMC Officers at Marine Barracks, Washington D.C. (1896). Second Lieutenant Magill is fourth from the left.

Louis John Magill (January 31, 1871 – February 20, 1921) was an American officer born in Erie, Pennsylvania, and serving in the United States Marine Corps during the Spanish–American War who was one of 23 Marine Corps officers approved to receive the Marine Corps Brevet Medal for bravery, but died before it could be presented.

== Secretary of the Navy citation ==
Citation

The Secretary of the Navy takes pleasure in transmitting to Second Lieutenant Louis John Magill, United States Marine Corps, the Brevet Medal which is awarded in accordance with Marine Corps Order No. 26 (1921), for good judgment and gallantry in battle while serving with the First Marine (Huntington's) Battalion, at Guantanamo, Cuba, on 13 June 1898. On 10 August 1898, Second Lieutenant Magill is appointed First Lieutenant and Captain, by brevet, to take rank from 13 June 1898.
