= William G. Powell =

United States Marine Corps general

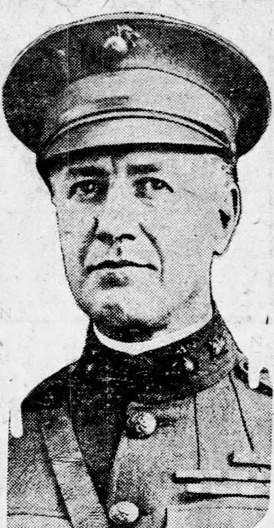
- Powell c. 1922
- Born: September 8, 1871; St. Louis, Missouri
- Died: May 11, 1955 (aged 83); Vence, France
- Burial place: initially France later moved to Arlington National Cemetery
- Military career
- Allegiance: United States of America
- Branch: United States Navy; United States Marine Corps
- Service years: 1893–1899 (USN); 1899–1942 (USMC)
- Rank: Brigadier General
- Conflicts: Spanish–American War; Philippine–American War; World War I
- Awards: Marine Corps Brevet Medal

William Glasgow Powell (September 8, 1871 – May 11, 1955) was an American officer born in at St. Louis, Missouri and serving in the United States Marine Corps during the Spanish–American War who was one of 23 Marine Corps officers approved to receive the Marine Corps Brevet Medal for bravery.

In 1893 Powell graduated from the United States Naval Academy in Annapolis, Maryland.

He began his military career by enlisting in the United States Navy during the Spanish–American War, and was commissioned a first lieutenant in the Marine Corps in 1899. He served in the Philippines and in China. During World War I he served as assistant paymaster.

He retired in 1942 after over 40 years of service and was promoted to brigadier general on the retired list.

On May 11, 1955, he died at his home in Vence, France, and was initially buried there; at the time, he was the last living recipient of the Marine Corps Brevet Medal. On May 12, 1983, his remains were brought back to the United States and interred in Arlington National Cemetery.

== Presidential citation ==
Citation:

The President of the United States takes pleasure in presenting the Marine Corps Brevet Medal to William Glasgow Powell, First Lieutenant, U.S. Marine Corps, for distinguished conduct and public service in the presence of the enemy at Tientsin, China. On 28 March 1901, appointed Captain, by brevet, from 21 June 1900.

== Secretary of the Navy citation ==
Citation

The Secretary of the Navy takes pleasure in transmitting to First Lieutenant William Glasgow Powell, United States Marine Corps, the Brevet Medal which is awarded in accordance with Marine Corps Order No. 26 (1921), for distinguished conduct and public service in the presence of the enemy while serving with the Second Battalion of Marines, at Tientsin, China, on 21 June 1900. On 28 March 1901, First Lieutenant Powell is appointed Captain, by brevet, from 21 June 1900.
