= John Twiggs Myers =

United States Marine Corps general

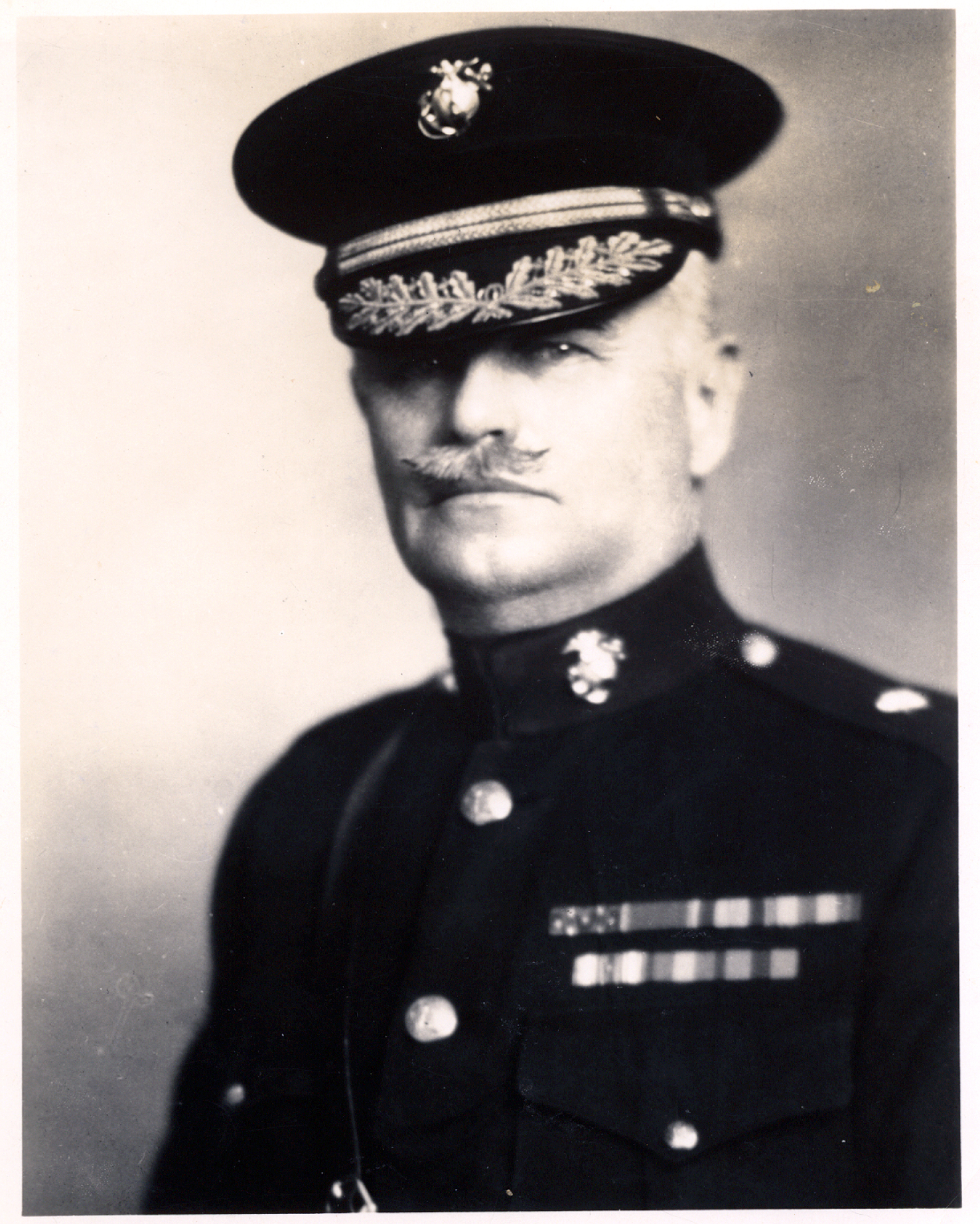
- Born: January 29, 1871; Wiesbaum, German Empire
- Died: April 17, 1952 (aged 81); Miami, Florida, U.S.
- Alma mater: United States Naval Academy
- Relatives: David E. Twiggs (grandfather); Abraham Myers (father)
- Military career
- Allegiance: United States of America
- Branch: United States Marine Corps
- Service years: 1895–1934
- Rank: Lieutenant General
- Nickname: "Handsome Jack"
- Commands: Department of the Pacific
- Conflicts: Spanish–American War; Capture of Guam; Battle of Manila; Philippine–American War; Battle of Olongapo; Battle of Bacoor; Boxer Rebellion; Siege of Peking; Banana Wars; Santo Domingo Expedition; Cuban Expedition; Haitian Expedition; Mexican Expedition; World War I; Battle of the Atlantic
- Awards: Marine Corps Brevet Medal

John Twiggs Myers (January 29, 1871 – April 17, 1952) was a United States Marine Corps general who was most famous for his service as the American Legation Guard in Beijing during the Boxer Rebellion.

== Early life ==
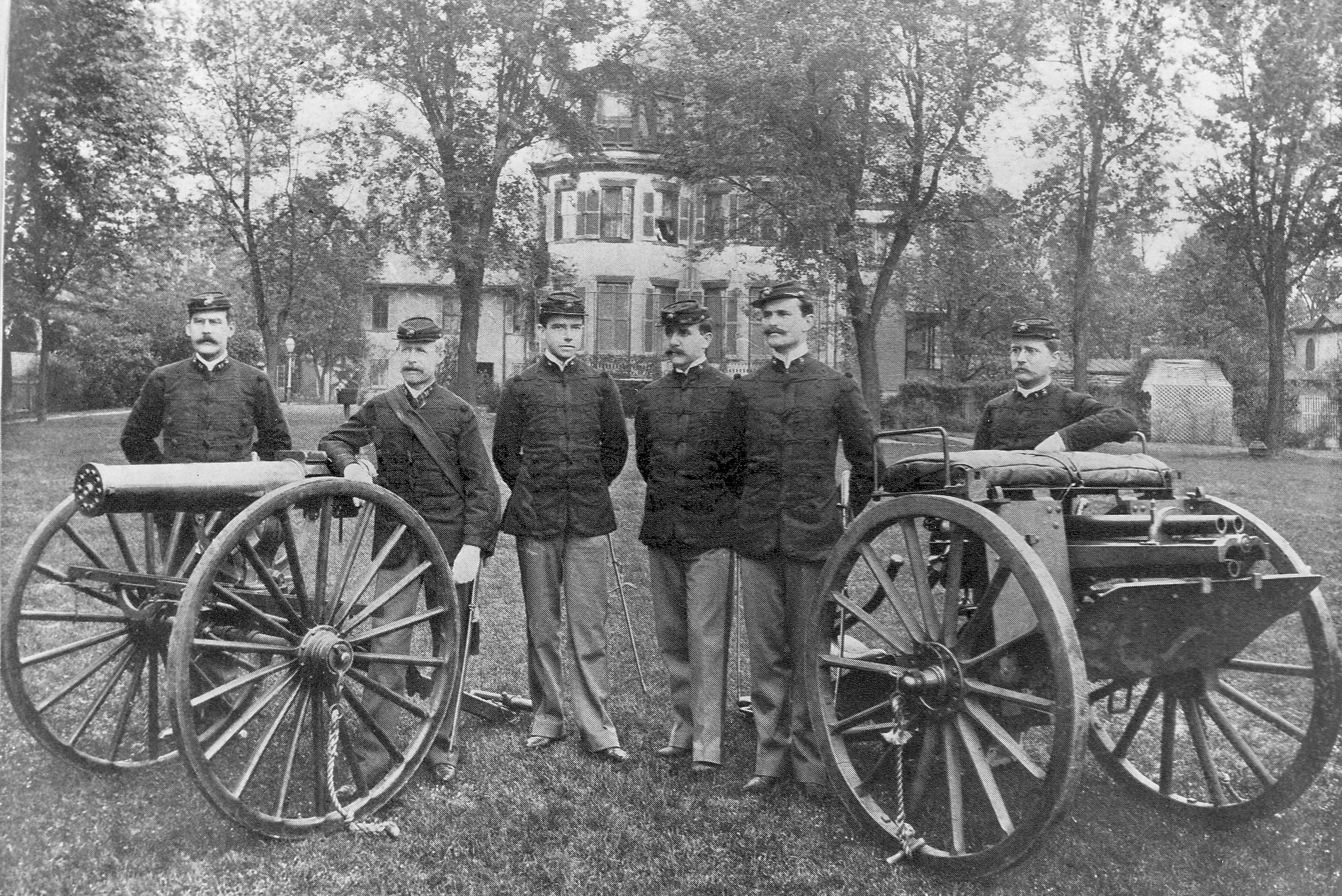
USMC Officers, Marine Barracks, Washington D.C., 1896. Then Second Lieutenant Myers is second from the right.

The son of Marion Twiggs (daughter of General David E. Twiggs) and West Point graduate and U.S. Army officer, later Confederate Quartermaster General Abraham Myers, John Twiggs Myers (known as "Jack" or jokingly, "Handsome Jack", to his friends) was born on January 29, 1871, in Wiesbaum, Germany.

He graduated from the United States Naval Academy in 1892 and was appointed an assistant engineer two years later. In March 1895, he was commissioned a second lieutenant in the United States Marine Corps. The city of Fort Myers, Florida was originally named for Myers' father.

In 1896, he became a Hereditary Companion of the Military Order of Foreign Wars by right of his father's service in the Mexican–American War. He was later eligible to become a Veteran Companion in the order by right of his own service in the Spanish–American War, the Philippine–American War, the Boxer Rebellion, and World War I.

== Service in Asia ==
After studying at the Naval War College in Newport, Rhode Island, Myers was sent on active duty at the outbreak of the Spanish–American War. He led a detachment which participated in the capture of Guam from its Spanish garrison, and sailed with the USS Charleston to the Philippines, then being attached to the USS Baltimore.

During the Philippine–American War, he led several amphibious landings against Filipino rebels in 1899, gaining recognition for his heroic conduct. He was promoted to Captain sometime in 1899.

In May 1900, Myers was sent to China aboard the cruiser USS Newark and put ashore with a detachment of 48 Marines (including then Private Daniel Daly) and 3 sailors to guard the US Legation in Beijing, just as the Boxer Rebellion broke out. Myers' Marines occupied a wall defending the Legations, arguably the most vulnerable part of the defensive position, and led an attack (along with Russian and British troops) as part of a ferocious battle on July 3 which dislodged the main Boxer position near the wall. Myers was wounded in the leg by a spear; his attack was claimed by the British Consul, Sir Claude Maxwell MacDonald, as "one of the most successful operations of the siege, as it rendered our position on the wall, which had been precarious, comparatively strong." As a result of his bravery in this action, he was brevetted Major and advanced four numbers in rank. In 1921, Myers would also become one of only 20 living Marines to be awarded the USMC Brevet Medal when that decoration was created. Upon recovering from his wounds, he served as the provost marshal on American Samoa and was then transferred to the Marine barracks at Bremerton, Washington.

== Later services ==
Myers led the detachment of Marines which accompanied the USS Brooklyn to Tangier, Morocco, during the Perdicaris affair in 1904. After the incident was concluded, Myers held various other posts, both barracks commands and naval commands, including a time period commanding the Marine attachment of the Asiatic Fleet. He took part in expeditions to Santo Domingo (1912) and Cuba (1913), and during World War I served as the counter-intelligence officer of the Atlantic Fleet.

Myers was made inspector general of the Department of the Pacific in 1921, serving in that post for three years, and from 1925 to 1928 commanded the 1st Marine Brigade, stationed in Haiti. He served various other posts, including, briefly, commander of the Department of the Pacific, before retiring a Major General in 1934; after his retirement, in 1942, he was given the rank of Lieutenant General. He relocated to Miami, Florida, after his retirement and died in Coconut Grove on April 17, 1952.

== Fictional portrayals ==
While not actually portrayed on film, Myers has inspired characters in several films. In the historical epic 55 Days at Peking, Charlton Heston portrayed Marine Major Matt Lewis, commanding the American Legation Guard in Beijing during the Boxer Rebellion. In The Wind and the Lion, the fictional Captain Jerome (played by Steve Kanaly) took on Myers' historical role, commanding the Marines dispatched to Tangier during the Perdicaris affair.

== Awards ==
General Myers' medals and decorations included:

| Marine Corps Brevet Medal | Purple Heart | |
| Marine Corps Expeditionary Medal | Spanish Campaign Medal | Philippine Campaign Medal |
| China Relief Expedition Medal (Navy) | Mexican Service Medal | World War I Victory Medal w/ Armed Guard clasp |
