= David Dixon Porter (Medal of Honor) =

US Marine Corps general and Medal of Honor recipient (1877–1944)

David D. Porter
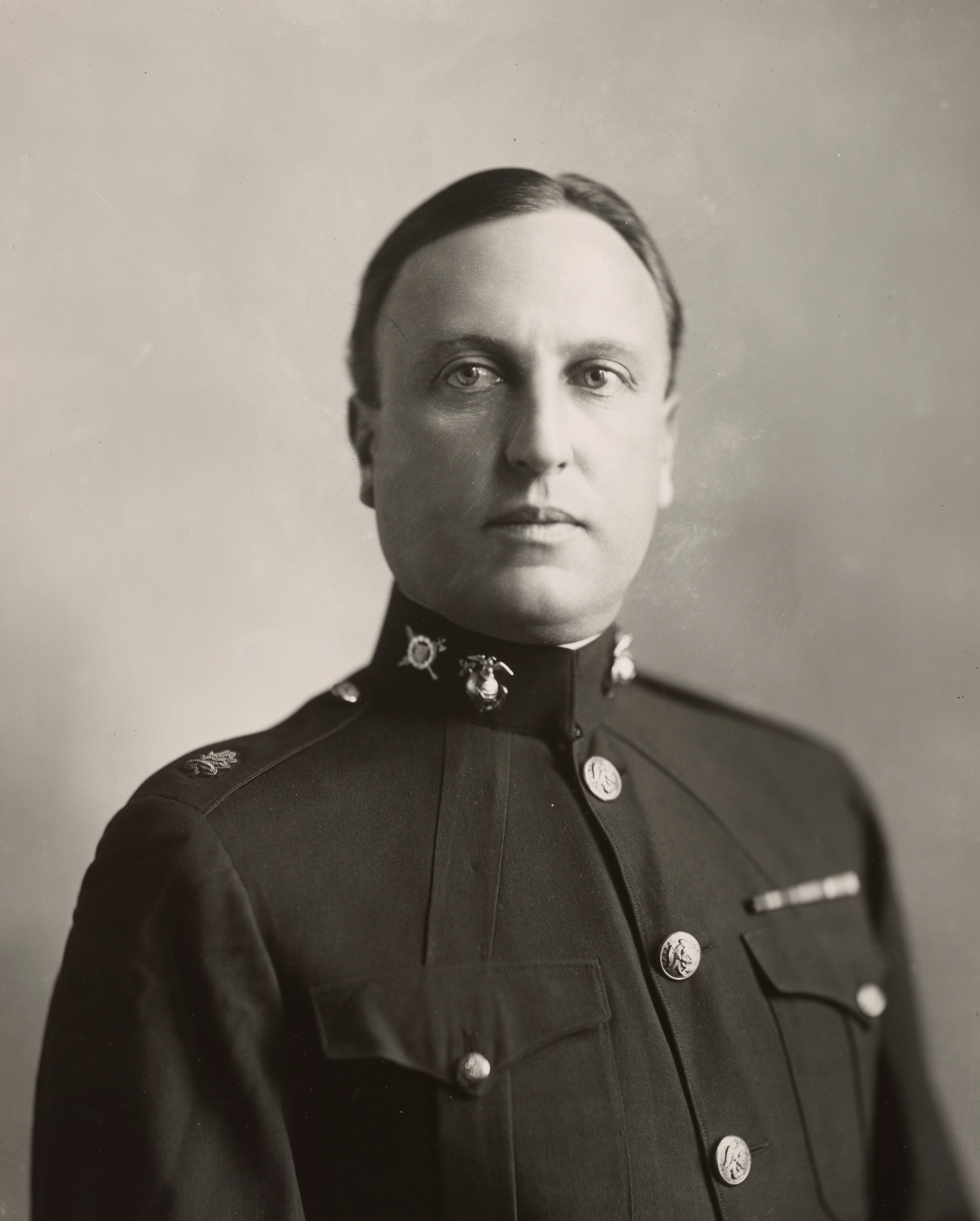
- David Porter in his uniform
- Born: April 29, 1877; Washington, D.C., US
- Died: February 25, 1944 (aged 66); Philadelphia, Pennsylvania, US
- Burial place: Arlington National Cemetery, Arlington, Virginia
- Military career
- Allegiance: United States of America
- Branch: United States Marine Corps
- Service years: 1898–1937
- Rank: Major general
- Conflicts: Philippine–American War; World War I
- Awards: Medal of Honor; Marine Corps Brevet Medal

Major General David Dixon Porter (April 29, 1877 – February 25, 1944), a Medal of Honor recipient, was a United States Marine Corps officer who served in the Philippine–American War and in World War I.

== Biography ==
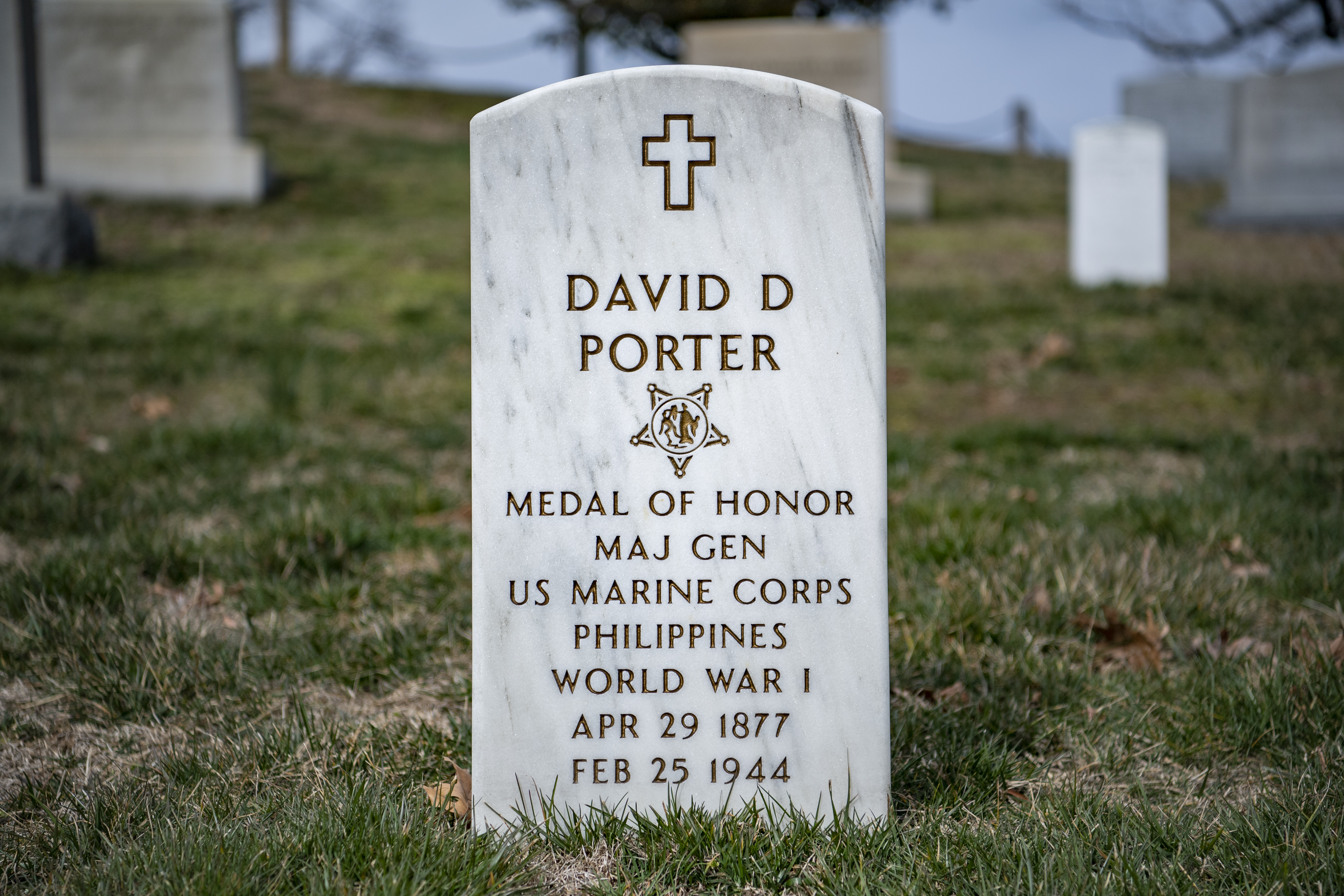
Grave at Arlington National Cemetery

He was the son of Lieutenant Colonel Carlile Patterson Porter (1846–1914), USMC, grandson of Admiral David Dixon Porter (1813–1891), and great-grandson of Commodore David Porter (1780–1843).

Porter received the Medal of Honor for service during the Philippine–American War, for his efforts in battle at the junction of the Cadacan and Sohoton Rivers, Samar on November 17, 1901. He was also one of the officers who participated in Waller's march across Samar.

Upon his retirement from the Marine Corps, Porter was promoted to major general on the retired list.

He was one of only three individuals to be awarded both the Medal of Honor and the Brevet Medal.

He was buried at Arlington National Cemetery, in Arlington, Virginia.

== Awards ==
- Medal of Honor
- Marine Corps Brevet Medal
- Spanish Campaign Medal
- Philippine Campaign Medal
- World War I Victory Medal

=== Medal of Honor citation ===
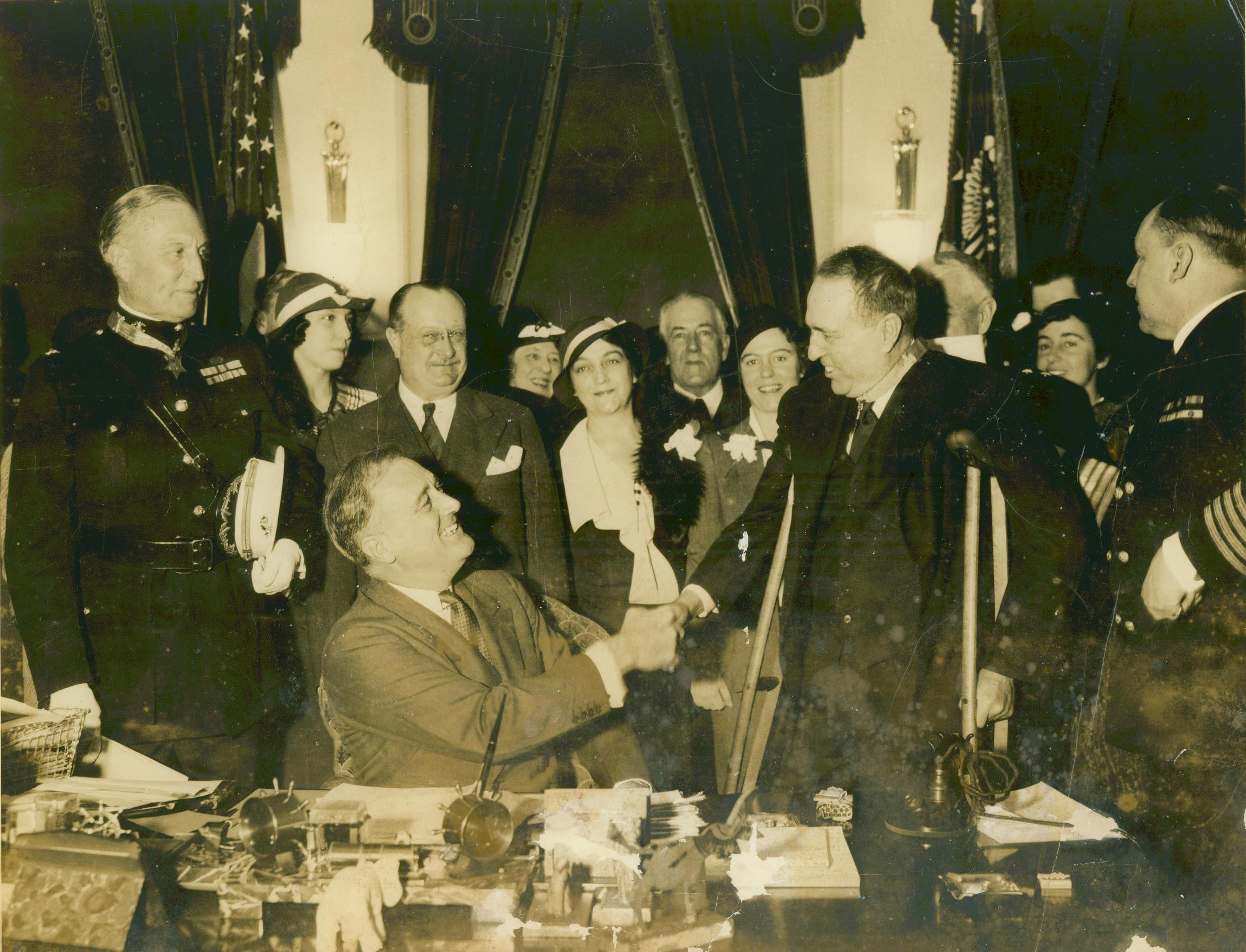
President Franklin D. Roosevelt presents the Medal of Honor to Dixon (left) and Hiram I. Bearss at a White House ceremony April 25, 1934

For extraordinary heroism and eminent and conspicuous conduct in battle at the junction of the Cadacan and Sohoton Rivers, Samar, P. I., November 17, 1901.

Citation:

In command of the columns upon their uniting ashore in the Sohoton Region, Col. Porter (then Capt.) made a surprise attack on the fortified cliffs and completely routed the enemy, killing 30 and capturing and destroying the powder magazine, 40 lantacas (guns), rice, food and cuartels. Due to his courage, intelligence, discrimination and zeal, he successfully led his men up the cliffs by means of bamboo ladders to a height of 200 feet. The cliffs were of soft stone of volcanic origin, in the nature of pumice and were honeycombed with caves. Tons of rocks were suspended in platforms held in position by vines and cables (known as bejuco) in readiness to be precipitated upon people below. After driving the insurgents from their position which was almost impregnable, being covered with numerous trails lined with poisoned spears, pits, etc., Col. Porter led his men across the river, scaled the cliffs on the opposite side, and destroyed the camps there. He and the men under his command overcame incredible difficulties and dangers in destroying positions which, according to reports from old prisoners, had taken 3 years to perfect, were held as a final rallying post, and were never before penetrated by white troops. Col. Porter also rendered distinguished public service in the presence of the enemy at Quinapundan River, Samar, Philippine Islands, on 26 October 1901.

=== Marine Corps Brevet Medal citation ===
Citation

The Secretary of the Navy takes pleasure in transmitting to First Lieutenant David Dixon Porter, United States Marine Corps, the Brevet Medal which is awarded in accordance with Marine Corps Order No. 26 (1921), for distinguished conduct and public service in the presence of the enemy while serving with the Second Battalion of Marines, at Novaleta, Philippine Islands, on 8 October 1899. On 28 March 1901, First Lieutenant Porter is appointed Captain, by brevet, to rank from 8 October 1899.

== See also ==
- List of Medal of Honor recipients
- Littleton W. T. Waller
