= Percival C. Pope =

American military officer (1841–1922)

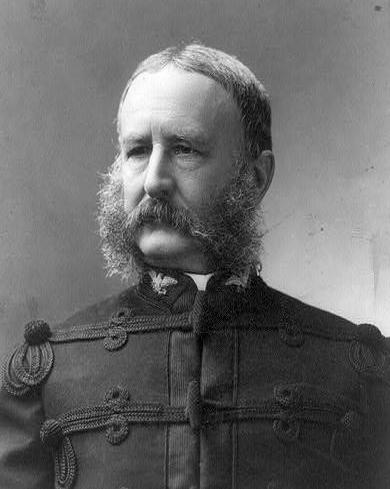
- Percival C. Pope
- Born: February 28, 1841; Boston, Massachusetts
- Died: January 22, 1922 (aged 80); Milton, Massachusetts
- Burial place: Cedar Grove Cemetery, Dorchester, Massachusetts
- Military career
- Allegiance: United States of America
- Branch: United States Marine Corps
- Service years: 1861–1905
- Rank: Colonel
- Units: USS Richmond; USS Powhatan; USS Monongahela; USS Susquehanna; USS Trenton
- Conflicts: American Civil War; Spanish–American War; Philippine–American War
- Awards: Marine Corps Brevet Medal

Percival Clarence Pope (February 28, 1841 – January 22, 1922) was an American officer who served in the United States Marine Corps during the American Civil War. He received the Marine Corps Brevet Medal for bravery.

== Early life ==
Pope was born February 28, 1841, at the Charlestown Navy Yard, Boston, Massachusetts, and was the son of the Union Navy officer Commodore John Pope.

== Military career ==
When the American Civil War started in 1861, he was only 21 but accepted an appointment in the United States Navy, on board the steam-sloop USS Richmond, which was commanded by his father. While aboard the Richmond, he and the other members of the crew participated in engagements from October 12–13, 1861, while on blockade duty at the Passes of the Mississippi River.

He accepted a commission in the Marine Corps in 1861 and served continuously for 44 years, retiring as a colonel in 1905 although he was promoted to brigadier general on the retired list. Although two Marine Corps officers were awarded the Brevet Medal for service during the Civil War, Pope is the only one to receive it because the other recipient, James Forney, died before it could be presented. During the second inaugural parade for President William McKinley, Pope commanded a Marine regiment.

General Pope was a First Class Companion of the Military Order of the Loyal Legion of the United States.

He died at his home in Milton, Massachusetts, January 22, 1922, and is buried in Cedar Grove Cemetery, Dorchester, Massachusetts.

A complete set of Pope's awards, including his Brevet Medal, are on display at the Navy Memorial Museum in Washington, D.C. His Brevet Medal is the only known original Marine Corps Brevet Medal on public display.

== Marine Corps Brevet Medal citation ==
Pope was given two citations in 1921 for service in the Civil War, one from the President of the United States and another from the Secretary of the Navy.

=== Presidential citation ===
Citation:

The President of the United States takes pleasure in presenting the Marine Corps Brevet Medal to Percival Clarence Pope, Second Lieutenant, U.S. Marine Corps, for gallant and meritorious service in the night attack upon Fort Sumter, on 2 March 1861, appointed Captain, by brevet, to rank from 8 September 1863.

=== Secretary of the Navy citation ===
Citation

The Secretary of the Navy takes pleasure in transmitting to First Lieutenant Percival Clarence Pope, United States Marine Corps, the Brevet Medal which is awarded in accordance with Marine Corps Order No. 26 (1921), for gallant and meritorious service while serving aboard the U.S.S. POWHATAN during the night attack upon Fort Sumter, on 2 March 1861. On 8 September 1863 First Lieutenant Pope is appointed Captain, by brevet, to rank from 8 September 1863.
