= James E. Mahoney =

United States Marine Corps general

James Edward Mahoney
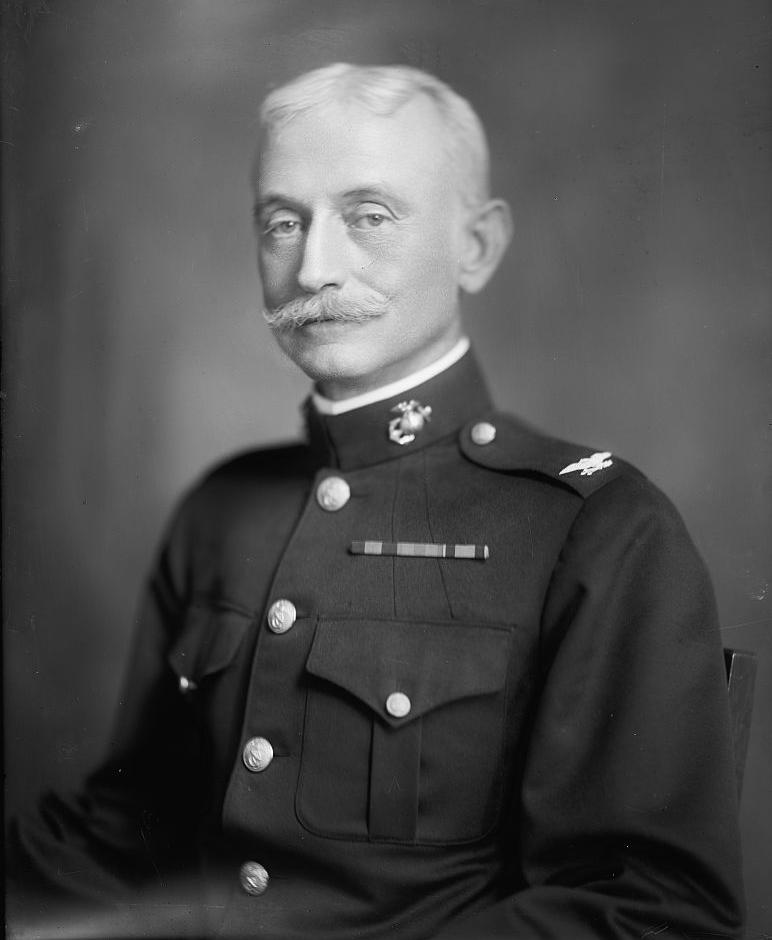
- James E. Mahoney
- Born: 15 December 1858; Peabody, Massachusetts, US
- Died: 9 June 1926 (aged 67)
- Burial place: Arlington National Cemetery
- Military career
- Allegiance: United States
- Branch: United States Marine Corps
- Service years: 1881–1919
- Rank: Brevet Brigadier General
- Conflicts: Spanish–American War; Pancho Villa Expedition
- Awards: Marine Corps Brevet Medal

James Edward Mahoney (December 15, 1859 – June 9, 1926) was an American officer born in Peabody, Massachusetts and serving in the United States Marine Corps during the Spanish–American War who was one of 23 Marine Corps officers approved to receive the Marine Corps Brevet Medal for bravery. He graduated from the United States Naval Academy in 1881. He subsequently served in Panama, Veracruz, Mexico, and in Cuba. After promotion to temporary rank of Brigadier General, he retired as a Colonel of Marines in 1919.

== Presidential citation ==
Citation:

The President of the United States takes pleasure in presenting the Marine Corps Brevet Medal to James Edward Mahoney, First Lieutenant, U.S. Marine Corps, for distinguished conduct and public service in the presence of the enemy at Guantanamo, Cuba, 11 June 1898. On 18 March 1901, appointed Captain by brevet.

== Secretary of the Navy citation ==
Citation

The Secretary of the Navy takes pleasure in transmitting to First Lieutenant James Edward Mahoney, United States Marine Corps, the Brevet Medal which is awarded in accordance with Marine Corps Order No. 26 (1921), for distinguished conduct and public service in the presence of the enemy while serving with Company E, First Marine (Huntington's) Battalion, at Guantanamo, Cuba, on 11 June 1898. On 18 March 1901, First Lieutenant Mahoney is appointed Captain, by brevet, to take rank from 11 June 1898.
