= China Relief Expedition Medal =

United States military award

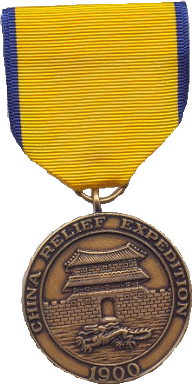
- China Relief Expedition Medal
- Type: Medal
- Presented by: Department of the Navy
- Eligibility: Perform duty within the borders of China as part of the China Relief Expedition.
- Status: Obsolete
- ribbon and streamer

The China Relief Expedition Medal was a decoration of the United States military which was issued to members of both the United States Navy and the United States Marines for service in the China Relief Expedition between 1900 and 1901 during the Boxer Rebellion. The medal was authorized by General Orders of the Department of the Navy on June 27, 1908. General Order 81 established the medal authorized for Naval personnel while General Order 82 authorized the medal for the Marine Corps.

== Description and symbolism ==
To be awarded the China Relief Expedition Medal, a service member was required to perform duty within the borders of China as part of the China Relief Expedition. The eligibility dates of the China Relief Expedition Medal were from May 24, 1900 to May 17, 1901. The medal was issued as a one time award and there were no devices authorized for multiple bestowals.

The United States Army equivalent of the China Relief Expedition Medal was the China Campaign Medal.

The ribbon of the Navy and Marine Corps version of the medal originally bore a yellow and black motif. The colors were changed in 1915 to yellow and blue to correspond with those of the U.S. Army medal issued for similar service.

The first 400 medals struck bear the date "1901." The die in use became damaged and replaced with a re-engraved die. This one, however, had the date "1900" which appears on all subsequent copies.

== See also ==
- List of military decorations
- Awards and decorations of the United States military
