= Timeline of the Philippine–American War =

The Philippine–American War, also known as the Philippine War of Independence or the Philippine Insurrection (1899–1902), was an armed conflict between Filipino revolutionaries and the government of the United States which arose from the struggle of the First Philippine Republic to gain independence following the Philippines being acquired by the United States from Spain. This article lists significant events from before, during, and after that war, with links to other articles containing more detail.

== Spanish–American War period ==
- 21–25 April – The Spanish–American War begins. War is declared by the United States and Spain.
- 1 May – Commodore George Dewey decisively defeated the Spanish fleet commanded by Patricio Montojo in the Battle of Manila Bay.

== Prewar events ==
Prior to the Spanish–American War, the Philippine Revolution against Spain had been suspended by the Pact of Biak-na-Bato. Following on that pact, Emilio Aguinaldo, who had been leader of the Katipunan, went into exile in Hong Kong along with other revolutionary leaders. Some revolutionaries remained in the Philippines and continued the revolution. When the Spanish–American War broke out, American forces sailed for the Philippines and decisively defeated the Spanish Navy. Aguinaldo then returned to the Philippines, and resumed a leadership role in the revolution. As the Spanish–American War continues, Aguinaldo proclaims Philippine independence and establishes an insurgent government.

=== 1898 ===
- 19 May – Emilio Aguinaldo returns to the Philippines from exile in Hong Kong aboard an American naval vessel
- 24 May – Aguinaldo issues a proclamation in which he assumed command of all Philippine forces and established a dictatorial government with himself as dictator.
- 12 June – The Philippine Declaration of Independence is proclaimed by Ambrosio Rianzares Bautista, its author, on behalf of the Dictatorial Government of the Philippines.
- 18 June – Aguinaldo, believing the Americans had no intent to occupy the Philippine Islands, issued a decree formally establishing the Dictatorial Government of the Philippines.
- 23 June – Aguinaldo issues a decree replacing the Dictatorial Government with a Revolutionary Government, with himself as president.
- 25 June – The third of three U.S. expeditions arrives in Manila, bringing U.S. land forces in the country to a total of 10,946 men.
- 8 August – Eight American soldiers were killed or wounded by the Spanish fire. American officers suspected at the time that the insurgents were informing the Spaniards of the American movements. This was later confirmed by captured insurgent documents.
- 12 August – The Protocol of Peace is signed in Washington, D.C. between the U.S. and Spain. U.S. President William McKinley directs that "all operations against the enemy be suspended." Word of this will not reach Manila until 16 August.
- 13 August – In the 1898 Battle of Manila, U.S. forces take possession of the country's capital. At the conclusion of the battle, U.S. forces control the city and Filipino forces remain in the suburbs.
- 14 August – U.S. Major General Wesley Merritt, at the time commander of U.S. forces in the Philippines, issues a proclamation establishing a military government in the Philippines, designating himself as Governor of the Philippines.
- 25 August – One American soldier was killed, another mortally wounded and four more slightly wounded in a clash at Cavite between American soldiers and Filipino revolutionaries. Aguinaldo expressed his regret and promised to punish the offenders.
- 26 September – American and Spanish delegations begin negotiations in Paris on a treaty to end the Spanish–American War.
- 10 December – The Treaty of Paris is signed in Paris. In Article III of the treaty, Spain cedes to the United States the archipelago known as the Philippine Islands.

=== 1899 ===
- 20 January – Malolos Congress ratifies the Malolos constitution.
- 21 January – Emilio Aguinaldo sanctions the Malolos Constitution.
- 22 January – Malolos Constitution is promulgated.
- 6 February – The U.S. Senate approved the Treaty of Paris by a vote of 52 to 27. President McKinley signed it on that day.
- 19 March – Spain ratified the Treaty of Paris when the Queen Regent María Cristina signed the agreement to break the impasse of the deadlocked Cortes.

== Start and ending dates ==
Depending on events chosen to mark the beginning and the end of the war, a number of different start and ending dates can be given. For purposes of this article, the war is considered to have begun on 4 February 1899, and to have ended on 4 July 1902.

Armed conflict erupted in Manila between U.S. and Filipino forces on 4 February 1899. On that date, Emilio Aguinaldo issued a proclamation ordering, in part, "[t]hat peace and friendly relations with the Americans be broken and that the latter be treated as enemies, within the limits prescribed by the laws of war." On 2 June 1899, the Malolos Congress enacted and ratified a Declaration of War on the United States, which was publicly proclaimed on that same day by Pedro Paterno, President of the Assembly.

The ending of the war was not formalized in a treaty by which it can be dated. Emilio Aguinaldo was captured by U.S. forces on 23 March 1901, and swore allegiance to the U.S. on 1 April, appealing to all Filipinos to accept the "sovereignty of the United States ...". Armed conflict continued, however, until the surrender of the last Filipino general on 13 April 1902. On 4 July 1902, U.S. President Theodore Roosevelt proclaimed a full and complete pardon and amnesty to all people in the Philippine archipelago who had participated in the conflict, and that July 4 date is often mentioned as the ending date of the war. On 9 April 2002, Philippine President Gloria Macapagal Arroyo proclaimed that the Philippine–American War had ended on 16 April 1902 with the surrender of General Miguel Malvar.

However, despite these proclamations from the Americans and ilustrado elite, the war continued across the archipelago for over a decade. Bands of guerrillas, millenarian movements and other resistance groups continued to roam the countryside, still clashing with American Army or Philippine Constabulary patrols. American troops and the Philippine Constabulary continued hostilities against such resistance groups until 1913. Some other sources describe post-1902 actions in Mindanao as a separate conflict.

== Timeline ==
=== 1899 ===
- 4 February – General hostilities erupt between U.S. inside Manila and Filipino forces surrounding the city.
- 4 February – Emilio Aguinaldo proclaims war on U.S. forces.
- 5 February – Battle of Manila: the first and largest battle of the Philippine–American War; Americans drive Filipino forces away from Manila.
- 31 March – American forces capture Malolos, capital of the Philippine Republic on Luzon, driving out Aguinaldo and his government.
- 9–10 April – Battle of Santa Cruz: U.S. General Henry W. Lawton captures Filipino stronghold of Santa Cruz and pushes into Laguna province on Luzon.
- 11 April – Battle of Pagsanjan: American sharpshooters skirmish with Filipinos outside of Pagsanjan, succeeding in driving them out. General Lawton's troops take Pagsanjan in the second action of the Laguna Campaign.
- 12 April – Battle of Paete: General Lawton's forces disperse Filipinos blocking route to Paete in a stiff fight. Paete taken by the Americans. The last action of the Laguna Campaign.
- 23 April – Battle of Quingua: Filipino General Gregorio del Pilar stops American cavalry scouts on Luzon, but is then routed after an artillery bombardment and infantry ground assault.
- 2 June – The Malolos Congress of the First Philippine Republic enacted and ratified a Declaration of War on the United States, which was publicly proclaimed on that same day by Pedro Paterno, President of the Assembly.
- 5 June – Filipino General Antonio Luna assassinated by Aguinaldo's men.
- 13 June – Battle of Zapote Bridge: Lawton's American forces rout a larger Philippine force under General Maximo Hizon and inflict heavy casualties on the enemy in 2nd largest battle of the Philippine–American War.
- 11 August - The U.S. ratified the Treaty of Paris, completing the exchange of ratifications with Spain.

^ 11 August - U.S. establishes the Insular Government of the Philippine Islands

- 11 November – Battle of San Jacinto: American General Loyd Wheaton drives Filipinos out of San Jacinto, Luzon.
- 13 November – Emilio Aguinaldo decrees that guerrilla warfare would henceforth be the strategy.
- 2 December – Battle of Tirad Pass: Sixty Filipino soldiers under General Gregorio del Pilar fight off an attack of 500 American soldiers for 5 hours, before nearly all Filipinos are killed, including del Pilar.
- 19 December – Battle of San Mateo (1899): For unknown reasons, General Lawton assumed personal command of the expedition, and was struck in the chest and killed when the unit he was with came under fire. The town of Montalban was occupied in the action before Lawton's death, and the town of San Mateo was occupied afterwards. Lawton was the only U.S. fatality in the action.

=== 1900 ===
- 15 April – In the Siege of Catubig, Filipino guerrillas launch a surprise attack against a detachment of American soldiers, and after a four-day siege, Americans evacuate the town of Catubig in Samar.
- May – General Arthur MacArthur, Jr. replaces General Elwell Stephen Otis as military governor and William Howard Taft arrived as civilian Governor-General of the Philippines (until 1904)
- June – General Arthur MacArthur, Jr. proclaims a 90-day amnesty and offers 30 pesos per rifle. The amnesty pledges "complete immunity for the past and liberty for the future." The results of the amnesty were disappointing. It is suspected that many of the natives surrendering were opportunists collecting bounty for obsolete weapons.
- 4 June – In the Battle of Makahambus Hill, Filipinos rout an American regiment and inflict heavy casualties, but take less than 5 casualties of their own.
- 1 September - U.S. President McKinly transfers legislative authority in the Philippines from the Military Governor to this Tart Commission.
- 13 September – In the Battle of Pulang Lupa, Filipino resistance fighters under Colonel Maximo Abad ambush 55 American Soldiers, killing, wounding, or capturing all of them.
- 17 September – Battle of Mabitac: Filipino forces outmaneuver and routed American forces on Luzon.
- 2 November – Incumbent William McKinley defeats Democrat William Jennings Bryan in the presidential election. Bryan was hurt by Aguinaldo's endorsement of the Democratic party. Albert Beveridge, the freshman senator from Indiana, emerged during the campaign as the "golden orator" of Republican imperialism, debating Senator George Frisbie Hoar, using his tour of the Philippines to claim direct knowledge of the war, holding out a golden nugget from the islands to prove its potential wealth: "I was there."

=== 1901 ===
- 5 March – Lonoy Massacre; in a reverse ambush, U.S. Infantryman launch a surprise attack on Bohol natives who had laid an ambush and kill over 400.
- 23 March – Aguinaldo is captured in Palanan, Isabela by Macabebe Scouts and U.S. forces.
- 1 April – Aguinaldo swears allegiance to the United States.
- 1 April – Aguinaldo appeals to all Filipinos to accept the "sovereignty of the United States ...".
- 19 April - Aguinaldo publishes a manifesto acknowledging and accepting U.S. sovereignty throughout the Philippines.
- 1 May - Generals Manuel Tinio & Benito Natividad surrender to Gen. J. Franklin Bell at Sinait and the complete pacification of Northern Luzon.
- 4 July – Civil government was inaugurated with William H. Taft as the Civil Governor.
- 28 September – Balangiga massacre; over 50 Americans are killed in an uprising on Samar. Gen. Jacob H. Smith orders retaliation.
- 7 December – American General J. Franklin Bell begins concentration camp policy in Batangas on Luzon - everything outside the "dead lines" was systematically destroyed—humans, crops, domestic animals, houses, and boats. A similar policy had been initiated on the island of Marinduque some months before. An American Anti-imperialist press argues this policy is similar to the reconcentrado policy of Spanish General Valeriano Weyler in Cuba and British General Horatio Kitchener in the Second Boer War in South Africa.

=== 1902 ===
- 31 January – Senator George Frisbie Hoar pushes for a Congressional investigation by the standing Committee on the Philippines headed by Senator Henry Cabot Lodge into alleged cruelties inflicted upon Filipino prisoners by U.S. servicemen. The investigation concluded on 28 June 1902. For two months after this the legal team presenting evidence for the committee compiled its report. This report was released on 29 August 1902. The report is available at Wikisource:Secretary Root's Record:"Marked Severities" in Philippine Warfare.
- 17 February – Filipino General Vicente Lukbán captured on Samar. Resistance continues in the Samar interior.
- 2 March – Court-martial of U.S. Marine Major Littleton Waller begins for the January execution of 11 mutinous porters on Samar. Court votes 11-2 for acquittal.
- 16 April – Filipino General Miguel Malvar surrenders in Luzon, followed by 3,000 of his men. The last Filipino general to surrender in the war.
- 27 April – The last guerrilla in Samar surrenders.
- Court-martial of U.S. General Jacob H. Smith for ordering the killing of all males over 10 years of age on Samar. He was convicted, verbally admonished, sent back to U.S., and retired from service.
- 16 June – U.S. military rule ends; civil government begins.
- 1 July – Passage of the Philippine Organic Act by the United States, the basic law of the Insular Government.
- 4 July – U.S. President Theodore Roosevelt proclaims a full and complete pardon and amnesty to all people in the Philippine archipelago who had participated in the conflict.

== Postwar events ==
=== 1904 ===
- Battle of Dolores River – Forty-seven Philippine Constabulary Scouts were ambushed by 1000 pulajans and nearly all killed.

=== 1906 ===
- 5–7 March – First Battle of Bud Dajo; one-thousand Moros fortify themselves in an extinct volcanic crater on Mindanao and battle a large number of American soldiers, before virtually all Moros Scouts killed.
- 17 July – Macario Sakay, president of the Tagalog Republic surrenders to Philippine Constabulary Chief Harry Hill Bandholtz.

=== 1911 ===
- September – General John J. Pershing, governor of the Moro province, ordered the complete disarmament of all Moros.
- December – In the Second Battle of Bud Dajo, U.S. forces, assaulted and captured a Moro-held defensive position in the Bud Dajo crater.

=== 1913 ===
- 11–15 June – Battle of Bud Bagsak.

== See also ==
- Campaigns of the Philippine–American War
