= Balangiga bells =

Church bells that had been taken by the United States Army from the Philippines

Coordinates: 11.1095°N 125.3853°E

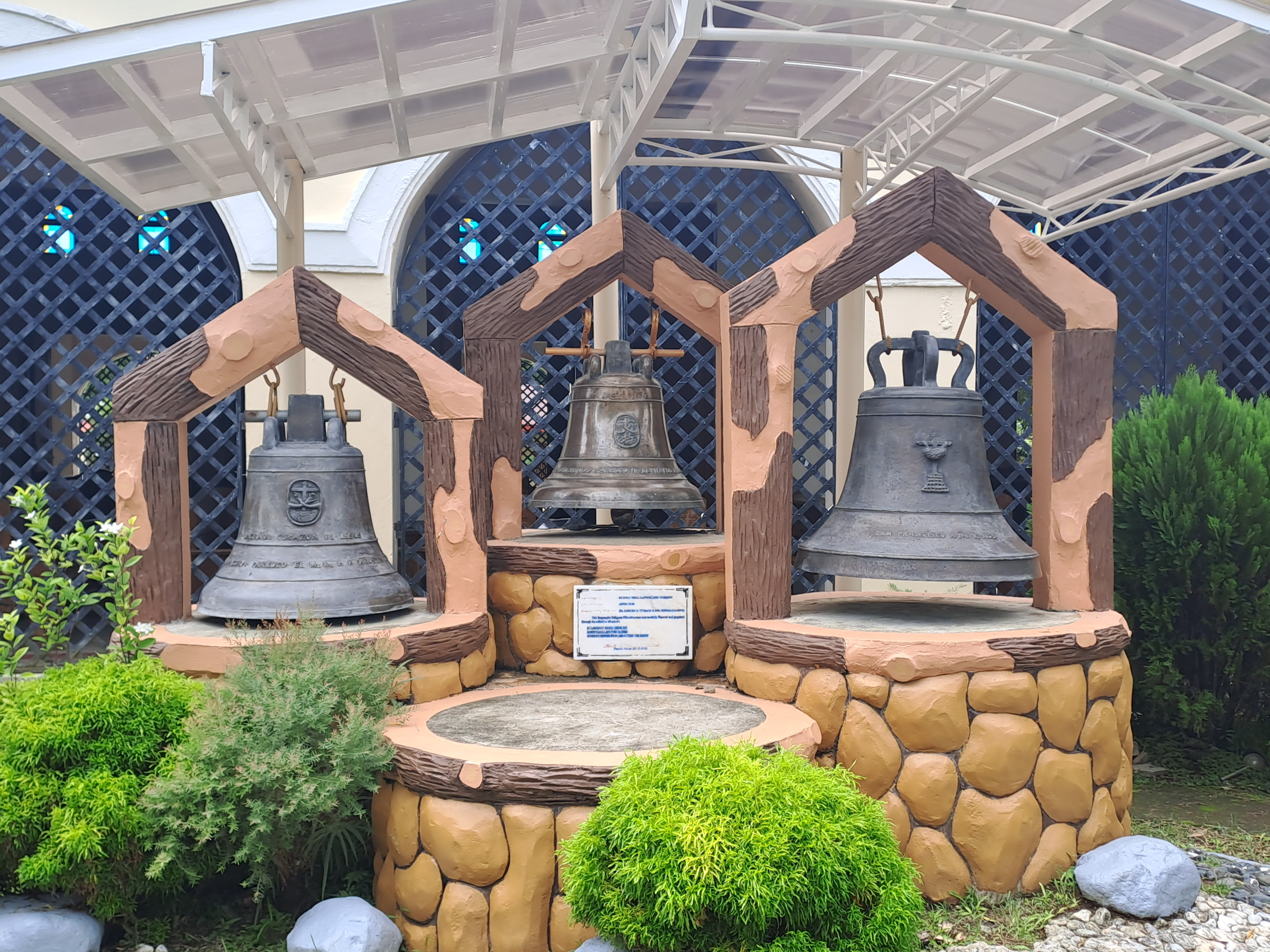
The three Balangiga bells on display at the San Lorenzo de Martir Parish Church

The Balangiga bells (Spanish: Campanas de Balangiga; Tagalog: Mga Batingaw ng Balangiga; Waray: Lingganay han Balangiga) are three church bells that were taken by the United States Army from the Church of San Lorenzo de Martir in Balangiga, Eastern Samar, Philippines, as war trophies after reprisals following the Balangiga massacre in 1901 during the Philippine–American War. One church bell was in the possession of the 9th Infantry Regiment at Camp Red Cloud, their base in South Korea, while two others were on a former base of the 11th Infantry Regiment at Francis E. Warren Air Force Base in Cheyenne, Wyoming.

People representing the Catholic Church in the Philippines, the Philippine government, and the residents of Balangiga had sought to recover the bells since the late 1950s, but their efforts were met with frustration for decades. Progress in negotiations was made in 2018, and the bells finally returned to the Philippines on December 11, 2018, after 117 years.

== History ==
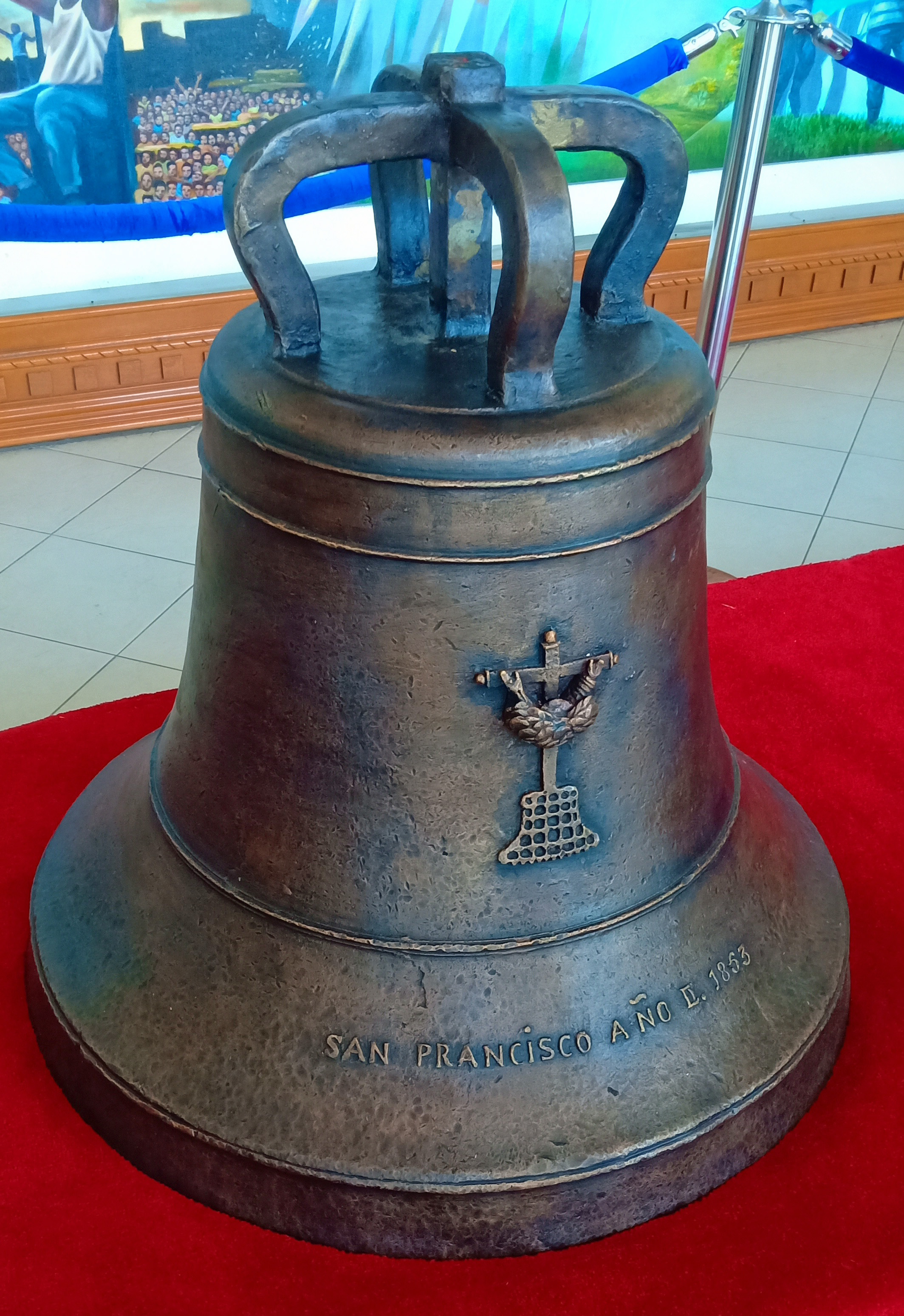
The 1853 bell

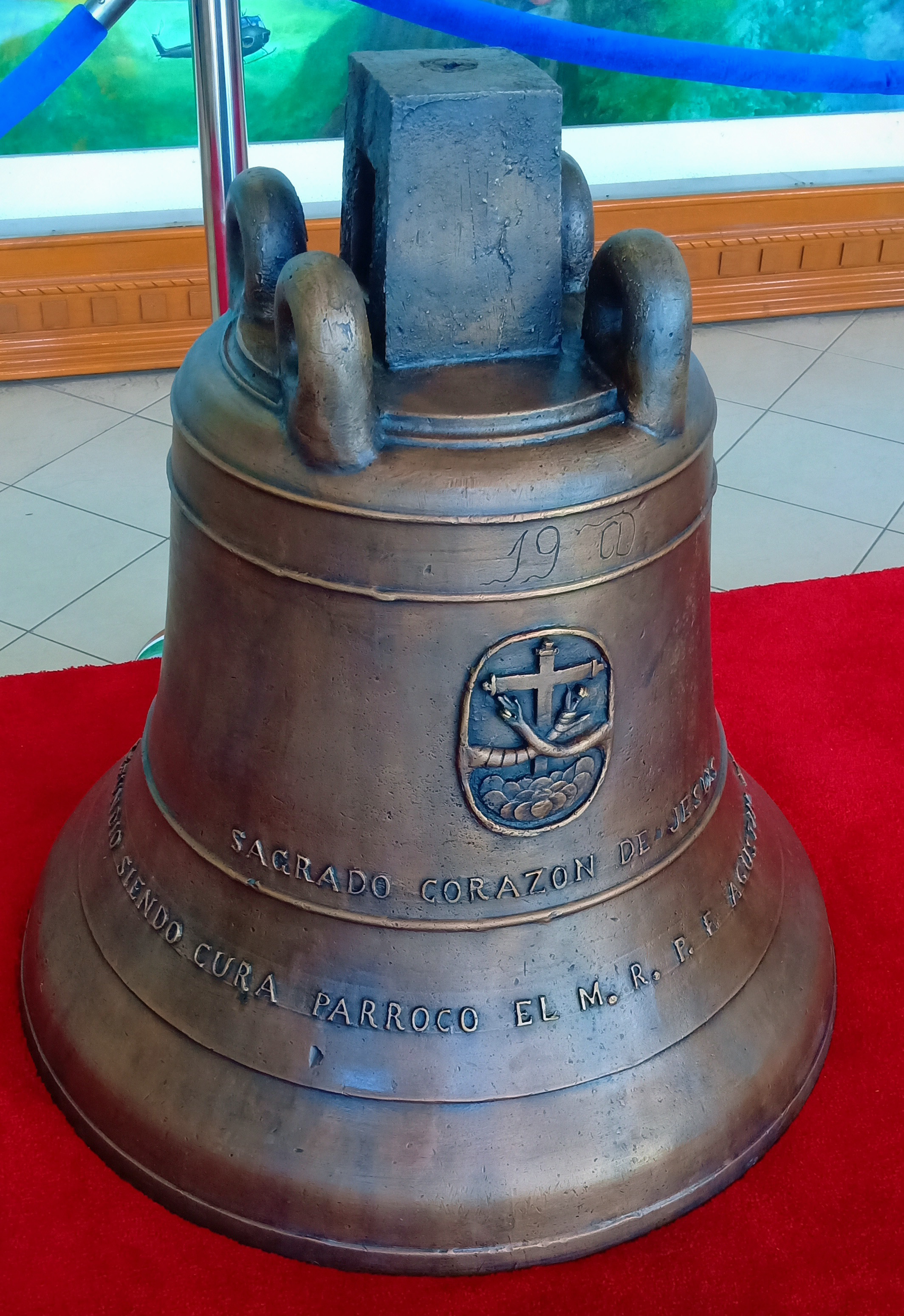
The 1889 bell

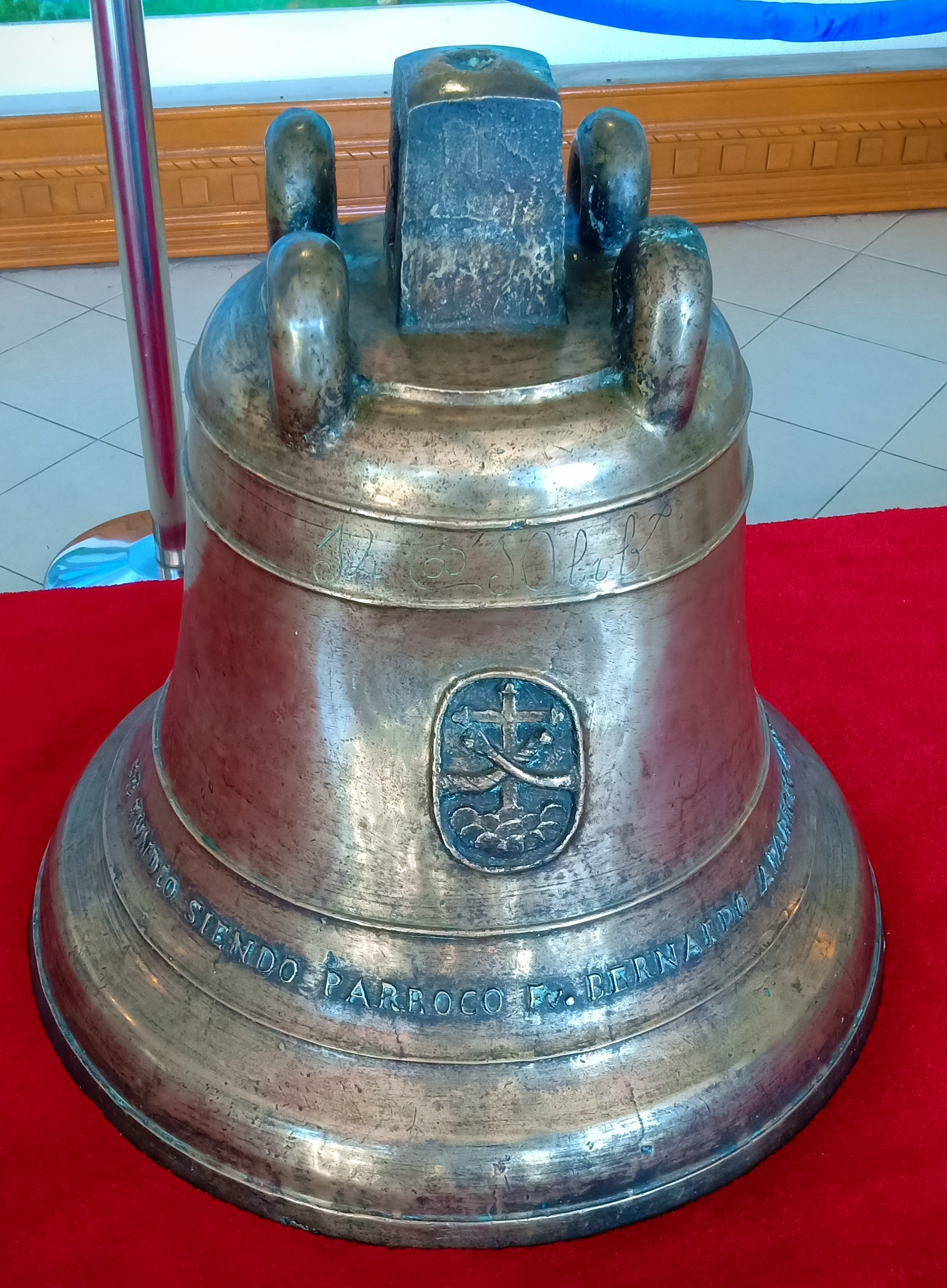
The 1895 bell

The three Balangiga bells

The Balangiga church was dedicated in 1854 to Roman martyr San Lorenzo, and in 1863, Fr. Cristobal Mirrales, a Jesuit Missionary maybe an Architect too, rebuilt the Balangiga Church consisting of Haligues o Poste de Madera, with four towers inside a quadrangle or fort, and that the church bell as told took four years probably by raising fund to acquire it. It was cast around 1853 and bears the Franciscan coat of arms. It has a mouth diameter of 31.25 inches (794 mm) inches and height of 30 inches (760 mm). The following inscription appears on this bell: "R. San Francisco Año El 1853" ("R. San Francisco The Year 1853"). R. San Francisco could have been the parish priest at that time, or the term may represent Religioso de San Francisco, a reference to the name of the religious order of Franciscans.

The second bell was cast around 1889 with a mouth diameter of 27.75 inches (705 mm) and height of 27.5 inches (700 mm). The town acquired it in 1889 through the initiative of Fr. Agustín Delgado, whose name is inscribed on it. The following inscription appears on this bell: "Se Refundió Siendo Cura Parroco El M.R.P.F (Note: M.R.P.F. is an acronym for the title Muy Reverendo Padre Fray ("Most Reverend Friar").) Agustín Delgado Año 1889". The bells were referred to as campanas colgantes in Spanish, meaning "hanging bells". These are usually hung from a beam and are rung using a rope attached to the clapper.

The third and smallest bell may have been acquired in 1895 through the initiative of Fr. Bernardo Aparicio. Estimates of its size deduce a 23-inch (580 mm) to 24-inch (610 mm) height and a mouth diameter of about 20 inches (510 mm). It bears the Franciscan emblem. The following inscription appears on this bell: "Se Refundio Siendo Parroco P. Bernardo Aparicio Año 1895". Bells of this type are known as esquila (small bell) or Campana de vuelo, literally a "flight bell" used to sound warning in times of peril. The Spanish word refundió means that the bell had been recast from scrap bronze.

== Balangiga massacre ==
On September 28, 1901, Philippine Republican Army soldiers, and irregular military forces and/or the Pulahan from Balangiga and nearby towns ambushed Company C of the 9th U.S. Infantry Regiment while they were at breakfast, killing 48 and wounding 22 of the 78 men of the unit, with only four escaping unhurt and four missing in action. The villagers captured about 100 rifles and 25,000 rounds of ammunition. An estimated 20 to 25 of them died in the fighting, with a similar number of wounded.

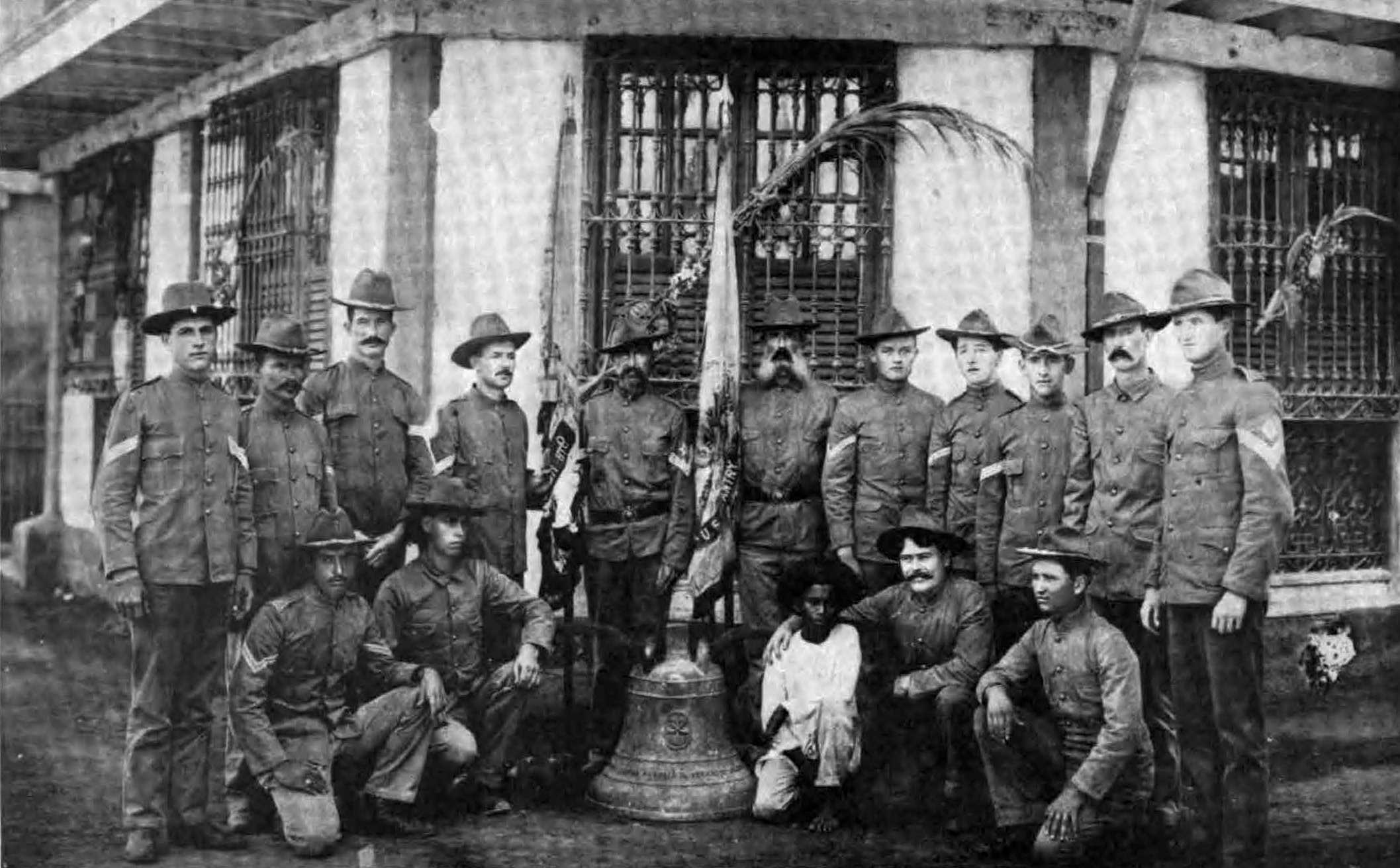
U.S. soldiers of Company C, 9th Infantry Regiment pose with one of the Balangiga bells seized as war trophy. Photo taken in Calbayog, Samar in April 1902.

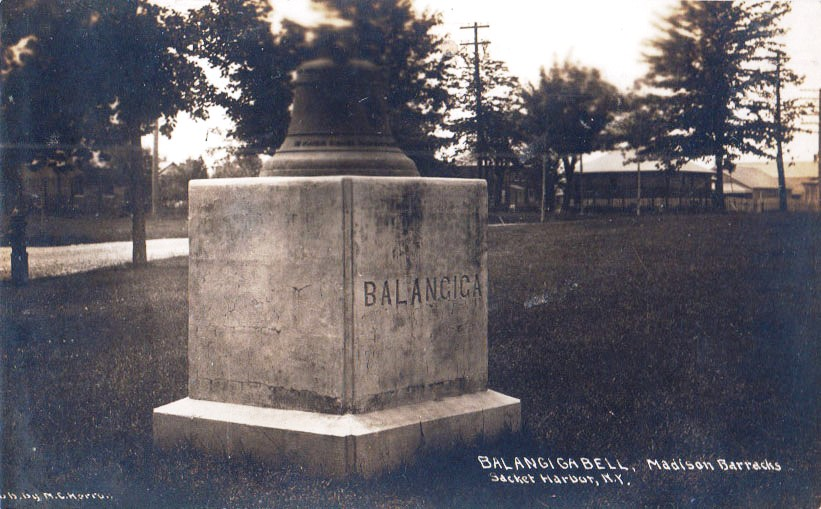
The signal bell displayed in the Madison Barracks at Sackets Harbor, New York station of the 9th US Infantry Regiment at the turn of the 20th century. This bell was later moved to Camp Red Cloud in Korea.

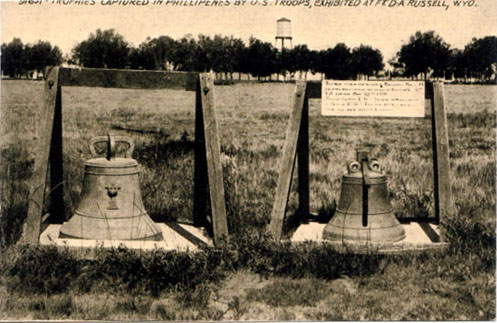
Two bells exhibited at Fort D.A. Russel (now Francis E. Warren Air Force Base) c. 1910

In reprisal, General Jacob H. Smith ordered that Samar be turned into a "howling wilderness" and that they shoot any Filipino male above ten years of age who was capable of bearing arms. This was the most widespread killing of Filipino civilians in the entire duration of the war. The aftermath of the massacre also led to the increased use of the water cure in Samar. The American soldiers seized three church bells from the town church and moved them back to the United States as war trophies. The 9th Infantry Regiment maintained that the single bell in their possession was presented to the regiment by villagers when the unit left Balangiga on April 9, 1902. The bell had been actually given to them by the 11th Infantry Regiment, which had taken all three bells when they left Balangiga for Tacloban on October 18, 1901.

Smith and his primary subordinate, Major Littleton Waller of the United States Marine Corps, were both court-martialled for war crimes against the civilian population of Samar. Waller was charged specifically of tying a local resident to a tree and shooting bullets into their body for three straight days, before finally killing them on the fourth. Waller was acquitted of the charges. Smith was found guilty, admonished and retired from service, but charges were dropped shortly after. He was later hailed as a war hero.

== Removal to the United States ==
After the Balangiga massacre, the town was recaptured on September 29, 1901, by 55 men of Company G, 9th Infantry. That unit departed the town the same day and was replaced by 132 men from Companies K and L of the 11th Infantry Regiment which garrisoned the town until relieved on October 18, 1901. When the 11th Infantry departed, they took the bells removed from the burned-down Balangiga church and a cannon from the plaza in front of the church. The bells were taken because one had been used by the Filipinos to signal the attack on Company C, 9th Infantry and because the metal could have been turned into weapons such as cannons and bayonets. All three bells remained under the charge of quartermaster Captain Robert Alexander at their Tacloban headquarters.

The small signal bell was the bell that signaled the attack against American troops by the Filipinos in the Balangiga massacre. The 11th Infantry gave it to the 9th Infantry Regiment at their headquarters in Calbayog a few months before the 9th Infantry's departure for home. They arrived in San Francisco on June 27, 1902. The unit was returned to its old Madison Barracks in Sackets Harbor, New York where they built a brick pedestal to display it. In 1928, it was moved to Fort Lewis in Tacoma, Washington. The bell was later kept at the 2nd Infantry Division Museum in Camp Red Cloud, Uijeongbu, South Korea. It had previously been displayed at the unit's Camp Hovey headquarters.

The 11th Infantry left the Philippines in February 1904 taking the two larger bells with them and redeployed to Fort D.A. Russell in Wyoming on March 23, 1904. On May 16, 1905, the Cheyenne Daily Leader reported that the cannon had been mounted on the parade ground near the flagpole along with other relics from the Philippines "to include the famous bell which gave the signal for the massacre of a whole company. Two large bells three feet tall and a seven-foot cannon were proudly displayed in front of the flagpole on the parade ground of the fort."

A sign was installed over one of the bells:

This bell hung in the church at Balangiga, Samar, PI, and rung the signal for the attack on Company C, 9th U.S. Infantry, Sept 29, 1901. Taken by Company L, 11th Infantry and detachment of Company K, 11th Infantry, the first units to reach the scene after the massacre.

The sign erroneously credited units of the 11th Infantry with being the first to reach Balangiga after the battle, but it was changed in 1911 giving proper credit to Company G, 9th Infantry for recapturing Balangiga. The 11th Infantry reposted to Texas in 1913, leaving the two large bells behind.

In 1927, Fort D.A. Russell was renamed Fort Francis E. Warren. The Army left Fort Francis E. Warren in 1941, again leaving the bells where they were. On October 7, 1949, the former Army base became Francis E. Warren Air Force Base, and the bells became artefacts in the collection of the National Museum of the United States Air Force. In 1967, Colonel Robert J. Hill, commander of the 90th Missile Wing, had a curved red brick wall constructed in the F. E. Warren AFB trophy park for the bells, with a bronze plaque on the wall between them telling the story of the massacre at Balangiga.

In 1987, a faint inscription was visible on the back of both bells, reading:

USED BY PHILIPPINOS [sic]
TO SOUND SIGNAL FOR MASSACRE
OF COMPANY "C" NINTH INFANTRY
AT BALANGIGA P.l.
28TH SEPTEMBER 1901

In 1979, it was discovered that a bronze cannon that was also taken from Balangiga had been cast in London in 1557 and bore the monogram of Mary I of England. As of 2001, a glass case housed the bells along with the 400-year-old Falcon cannon.

== Recovery attempts ==
On December 23, 1935, Eugenio Daza, a leader in the Balangiga Encounter, gave a sworn statement detailing the Balangiga Encounter and the surrounding events, entitled "Balangiga su Historia en la Revolucion el 28 de Septiembre la 1901". Daza's memoir ended with a plea for the return of the bells:

"...one of the bells which were rung on that memorable day of the heroic battle, was taken by the Americans to the United States. Could we secure its return? That depends on the patriotism of our leaders and the good will of the American people"

In November 1957, Fr. Horacio de la Costa of the Department of History at the Ateneo de Manila University wrote a letter to the Thirteenth Air Force's command historian Chip Wards at Clark Air Force Base stating that the bells belonged to the Franciscans and that they should be returned to the Philippines. The following year, a group of American Franciscans based in Guihulngan, Negros Oriental again wrote to Wards, stating that the two large bells were Franciscan.

In 1987, Tomas Gomez III, then serving as Consul General of the Philippine Consulate in Honolulu, Hawaii received correspondence from John Witeck concerning the bells. Walter Kundis, a friend of Witeck's, had discovered the bells at the Francis E. Warren Air Force Base in Wyoming. Witeck also wrote to Hawaii Senator Spark Matsunaga, seeking his assistance in having the bells returned to the Philippines. Senator Matsunaga in turn wrote to the Department of the Air Force, but received a negative reply.

By sharing the bells, we share the agonies they represent, and then we can close this chapter of our history.

— Domingo Siazon Jr., Philippine Secretary of Foreign Affairs, quoted from the Los Angeles Times, 1998

The administration of Philippine President Fidel Ramos initiated attempts to recover one or more of the bells from Bill Clinton's administration in the mid-1990s. In 1994, during a one-on-one between Ramos and Clinton in the Philippines, Clinton offered to return the Balangiga Bells to the Philippines "in the spirit of fair play." However, Roy Daza, a representative of Ramos sent to the U.S. on the matter of the bells, was informed that Clinton's offer was considered "illegal" in some State Department circles. The United States government has been adamant that the bells are US government property, that it would take an Act of Congress to return them, and that the Catholic Church has no say in the matter. The Catholic Bishops' Conference of the Philippines hold the position that the bells are inappropriate as trophies of war. In 1998, Ramos proposed casting two new bells, then having each country keep an original and a duplicate. Philippine Ambassador to the United States Raul Rabe visited Cheyenne, Wyoming twice, trying to win support for this proposal. However, he was not successful.

In 2002, the Philippine Senate approved Senate Resolution No. 393, authored by Aquilino Pimentel Jr. and urging the Arroyo administration to undertake formal negotiations with the United States for the return of the bells. In 2005, Bishop of Borongan, Samar, Bishop Leonardo Medroso, and Balangiga parish priest Saturnino Obzunar wrote an open letter addressed to President George W. Bush, the United States Congress, and the Helsinki Commission requesting them to facilitate the return of the bells. That same year, the Wyoming Veterans' Commission favored the return of the Filipino-American War relics, but Wyoming Governor Dave Freudenthal stated that he disagreed with the Commission and opposed returning the bells. On January 13, 2005, Congressman Bob Filner introduced H.Res.313 urging the President to authorize the transfer of ownership of one of the bells to the people of the Philippines. The resolution died on January 3, 2007, with the adjournment of Congress. On September 26, 2006, Congressmen Bob Filner, Dana Rohrabacher, and Ed Case co-sponsored House Concurrent Resolution No. 481 urging the President to authorize the return of the church bells, but it died on January 3, 2009, with the adjournment of Congress.

In 2007, Napoleon Abueva, the Philippines' National Artist for sculpture, wrote to American Ambassador to the Philippines Kristie Kenney asking for her help in the bells' recovery. Senator Manny Villar filed Senate Resolution No. 177 on October 25, a resolution "expressing the sense of the Senate for the return to the Philippines of the Balangiga Bells which were taken by the US troops from the town of Balangiga, Province of Samar in 1901".

Give us back those Balangiga bells. They are ours. They belong to the Philippines. They are part of our national heritage. Isauli naman ninyo. Masakit 'yan sa amin. (Please return it. That is painful for us.)

— Rodrigo Duterte, Philippine President, quoted from his State of the Nation Address, 24 July 2017

The townspeople of Balangiga asked the United States to return the church bells when they received relief from the U.S. military after Typhoon Haiyan hit the town in 2013. President Duterte demanded the bells' return in his State of the Nation Address on July 24, 2017, but he did not raise the issue in a bilateral meeting with President Donald Trump in November 2017 during the 31st ASEAN Summit. In February 2018, politicians Randy Hultgren and Jim McGovern, to no avail, objected to the bells being returned to the Philippines due to the current human rights record established by Duterte's Philippine drug war. The bells were restored and returned by December 2018.

== Repatriation ==
The history of these bells spans the entire relationship between the United States and the Philippines. In the process, they have touched many lives. And their return underscores the enduring friendship between our countries, our shared values, and shared sacrifices.

— Sung Kim, US Ambassador to the Philippines, quoted from his remarks at the Ceremony of the Return of the Balangiga Bells, 11 December 2018

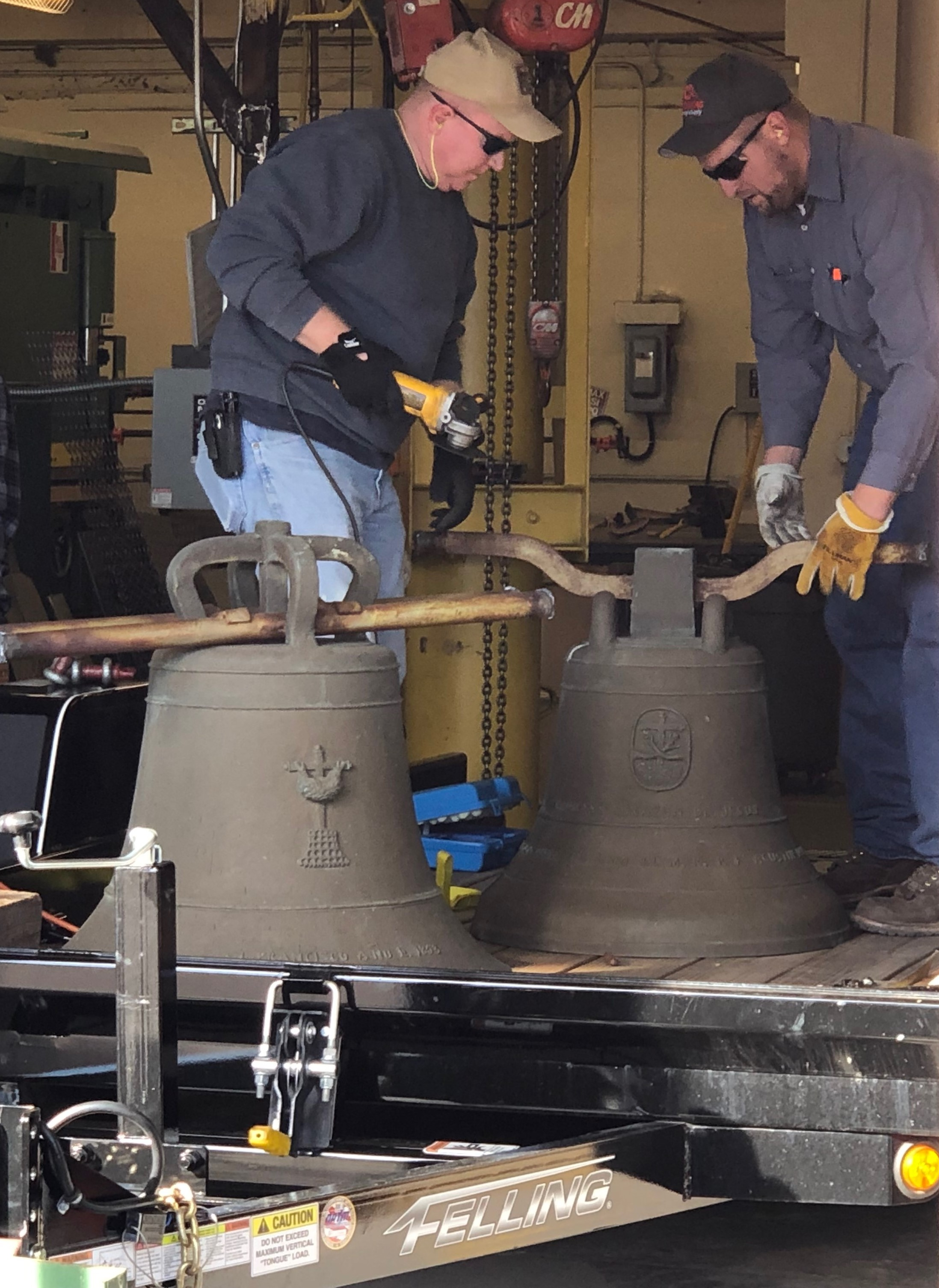
The two Balangiga bells in Wyoming after removal from display at F. E. Warren AFB

During the 2017 ASEAN Summits, Philippine Secretary of National Defense Delfin Lorenzana met with United States Secretary of Defense Jim Mattis, and Lorenzana raised the issue of the Balangiga bells. Mattis made a personal commitment to secure the bells' return in a meeting with Philippine President Rodrigo Duterte, and he then sought legislation to enable the legal repatriation of the bells. Philippine Ambassador to the United States Jose Manuel Romualdez, however, disclosed in an interview with CNN Philippines that President Duterte personally told Mattis to return the bells during the ASEAN Summit meeting in Clark, Pampanga in October 2017.

The US National Defense Authorization Act was changed as a result of the 2017 lobbying efforts of Dr. Henry B. Howard and lobbying firms hired by him to expressly permit the return of the Balangiga bells by giving Secretary of Defense Mattis the authority to decide on the matter.

=== Congressional action, 2017–2018 ===
Since 1999 the return of the bells had been blocked by a series of provisions in the annual National Defense Authorization Act (NDAA) barring the transfer of "veterans memorial objects" to foreign governments without specific authorization in law. The first moratorium, enacted in the FY2000 NDAA in response to the Clinton administration's willingness to return a bell, was extended by the FY2006 NDAA through fiscal year 2010 and by the FY2013 NDAA through September 30, 2017.

==== FY2018 NDAA and the conference exception ====
As the 2017 expiration approached, Representative Liz Cheney (R-Wyoming) secured a provision in the FY2018 NDAA (H.R. 2810) during the House Armed Services Committee's consideration of the bill. The provision, Section 2841 of the bill as reported on July 6, 2017, extended the moratorium a further five years, to September 30, 2022, and narrowed the definition of covered objects to those brought to the United States before 1907. The House passed the bill with the provision on July 14, 2017; the Senate's version contained no comparable language. Cheney described the bells as "a memorial to American soldiers killed in action during the Philippine-American War."

In the House–Senate conference on the bill in October and November 2017, the Senate receded with an amendment that kept the extended moratorium but created a specific exception for the Balangiga bells. The resulting Section 2864(c) of the enacted law authorized the President to transfer the bells—identified in the statute as the veterans memorial object known as the Bells of Balangiga—to the Republic of the Philippines upon a certification by the Secretary of Defense to Congress that the transfer was in the national security interests of the United States and that appropriate steps had been taken to preserve the history of the veterans associated with the object, including consultation with associated veterans organizations and government officials in Wyoming. The transfer could take place no sooner than 90 days after the certification.

Representative Don Bacon (R-Nebraska), a member of the House Armed Services Committee and the only freshman member of the committee appointed to the conference, pressed for the exception. Bacon later said that Bellevue, Nebraska, mayor Rita Sanders and Filipino-American constituents had asked him to pursue the bells' return, and that "there was an effort to renew the prohibition on returning them, but I wanted to ensure a legal pathway to heal old wounds and strengthen our strategic relationship with a key ally." Of the return, Bacon said, "It was the right thing to do." The Office of the Secretary of Defense had also asked conferees for authority to return the bells on a national-security determination. Wyoming's senators, John Barrasso and Mike Enzi, criticized the outcome; Barrasso said that "while Senate conferees weakened her amendment in conference, it was only because of [Cheney's] leadership that the bill retains some protection against their removal." The conference report was signed into law on December 12, 2017, as the National Defense Authorization Act for Fiscal Year 2018 (Pub. L. 115–91 (text) (PDF)).

==== FY2019 NDAA attempt to repeal the exception ====
The exception was revisited in the following year's bill. The FY2019 NDAA (H.R. 5515) as reported by the House Armed Services Committee on May 15, 2018, contained a provision, Section 2844, that would have amended Section 2864(c) to require the Secretary of Defense's certification to include a report, with a classified annex, describing the effects of the transfer on United States national security interests and the consultation efforts undertaken with veterans organizations and Wyoming officials, effective retroactively to the FY2018 act's enactment. Representative Steve Russell (R-Oklahoma) filed a floor amendment that would have gone further, replacing that section with an outright prohibition and striking Section 2864(c) retroactively to the date of the FY2018 act's enactment. The amendment was not among those made in order by the Rules Committee and did not receive a floor vote; the House passed H.R. 5515 on May 24, 2018, by a vote of 351–66. Section 2844 itself did not survive conference: the Senate amendment contained no similar provision, and the House receded, leaving the FY2018 exception intact in the enacted law. The conferees' joint explanatory statement described the dropped provision as one that would have amended Section 2864 "to require a report prior to the return of certain veterans memorial objects."

==== Certification and veterans' support ====
In early 2018 Bacon wrote to Secretary of Defense Jim Mattis inquiring about the status of the bells, stating that "I am convinced there is a path forward that appropriately honors the service and sacrifice of veterans associated with these objects and removes an obstacle in building trust with a key ally to advance the national security of the United States." On August 9, 2018, Mattis transmitted the required certification to the House and Senate Armed Services Committees. Wyoming's congressional delegation—Enzi, Barrasso, and Cheney—issued a joint statement on August 13 calling the bells "memorials to American war dead" that "should not be transferred to the Philippines," and said they opposed any transfer without the support of veterans.

That support had shifted during the intervening year. In July 2017 the Veterans of Foreign Wars national convention had rejected a resolution from its Department of Pacific Areas urging the bells' return, and the organization took no national position. Following a campaign directed at veterans by retired Navy officers Daniel McKinnon, Dennis Wright, and Brian Buzzell, and outreach by Defense Department officials, both the VFW and the American Legion adopted resolutions at their August 2018 national conventions supporting the return; the American Legion rescinded a 2016 resolution that had opposed it. Mattis announced the return at a Veterans Day ceremony at F.E. Warren Air Force Base on November 14, 2018. Barrasso continued to object; in an October 2019 Senate Foreign Relations Committee hearing he opposed the nomination of former ambassador Sung Kim to Indonesia over Kim's support for the transfer.

In August 2018, Secretary Mattis informed Congress that the Department of Defense intended to return the bells to the Philippines. That month the US Embassy in the Philippines issued a statement that the Department of Defense had notified Congress that it planned to return the bells to the Philippines at an unspecified date. The U.S. Department of Defense subsequently announced that the two bells at the Francis E. Warren Air Force Base would be turned over by Secretary Mattis to Ambassador Romualdez on November 15, 2018, in Cheyenne, Wyoming. The third bell in South Korea was also ready for repatriation. The two bells in Wyoming were then shipped to Philadelphia for restoration work at the expense of Dr. Howard before being sent to Japan, where they joined the third bell.

On December 10, 2018, all three church bells were in Kadena Air Base in Japan awaiting repatriation to the Philippines. The next morning, the US Embassy in the Philippines stated that the bells were on board a US Air Force Lockheed C-130 Hercules on the way to Manila.

=== Arrival in Manila ===
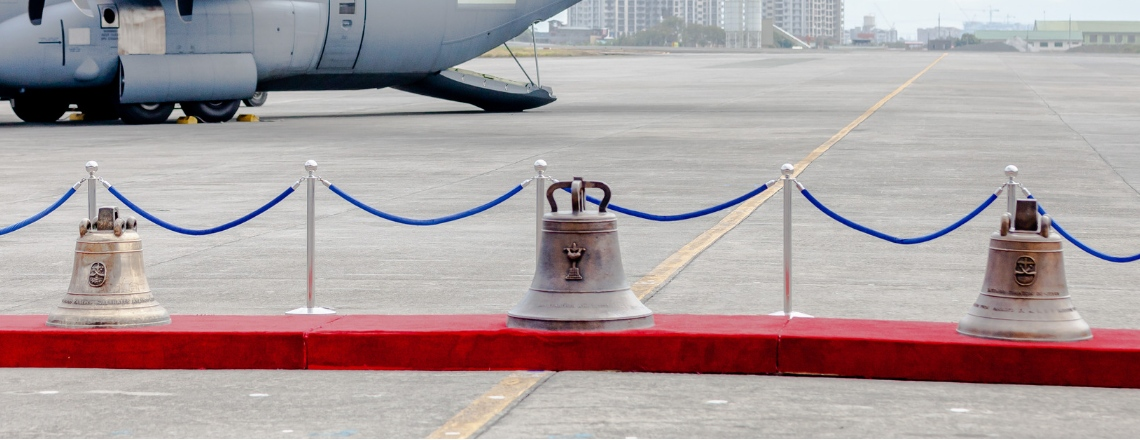
The Balangiga bells on display during a repatriation ceremony at Villamor Air Base. The left bell had been kept by the Army's 9th Infantry Regiment at Camp Red Cloud in South Korea; it is the smallest of the three. The bell in the center is the largest; it and the right-most bell had been displayed at the F.E Warren Air Force Base's Trophy Park in Cheyenne, Wyoming.

The bells arrived in the Philippines at Villamor Air Base on December 11, 2018; and were returned to the Balangiga Church on December 15, 2018. While in Manila, the bells were put on display at the Philippine Air Force Aerospace Museum until December 14.

On December 13, 2018, Borongan Bishop Crispin Varquez released a statement objecting to the proposal embodied in Philippine Senate Resolution No. 965 introduced by Senator Migz Zubiri on December 6, 2018, which urged the Philippine government to place one of the three bells in the National Museum of the Philippines in Manila, "to be shared with the Filipino people". The representatives of the Catholic Church stated that the bells are historical artifacts, but they are also sacred objects that "call the faithful to prayer and worship" and therefore rightfully belong in a church. Zubiri characterized the statement as "arrogant"; National Museum director Jeremy Barns expressed sadness over the incident, and stated that the National Museum had not been involved in Zubiri's resolution, nor had they been informed about it before the fact.

=== Return to Samar ===
Rodrigo Duterte's speech during the return of the Balangiga Bells (0:41)
Video clip of President Rodrigo Duterte's speech during the return of the Balangiga Bells to the Philippines, December 15, 2018

The bells were airlifted by a Philippine Air Force C-130 plane to the nearby town of Guiuan, arriving on December 14. These were then delivered to Balangiga in a two-hour journey via road. The bells were then turned over to the Balangiga town the next day. In a ceremony attended by President Rodrigo Duterte, the transfer certificate was given to Mayor Randy Graza. Duterte then rang one of the bells, and remarked that the credit for the return of the bells "goes to the American people and the Filipino people".

The three church bells were returned to the San Lorenzo de Martir Parish Church in the afternoon of December 15, 2018. On Sunday the next day before dawn, one of the bells was rung for Simbang Gabi for the first time in the church since 1901.

The return of the bells sparked an economic renaissance in Balangiga, leading to opening of new businesses. The United States ambassador to the Philippines, MaryKay Carlson, visited the bells on 2022.

The successful campaign to return the bells came about due to lobbying efforts of Dr. Henry B. Howard to change the 2018 National Defense Appropriations Act and the implementation of such changes by U.S. Deputy Assistant Secretary of Defense Dr. Joseph Felter. Subsequent to these efforts, support of veterans organizations, including the Veterans of Foreign Wars and the American Legion, although not a legal requirement of the 2018 National Defense Appropriations Act, emerged with both organizations passing resolutions supporting the return of the Balangiga bells after the changes to the 2018 National Defense Appropriations Act and the announcement by Secretary Mattis that the bells would be returned. Rolando Borrinaga and former United States Navy officers Brian Buzzell, Dennis Wright, and Dan McKinnon are described as those who "campaigned to have the bells repatriated" via lobbying of the veterans organizations; these same American ex-servicemen had spearheaded the recovery from West Point in 2016 of another church bell taken in 1901 from the Saints Peter and Paul Church in Bauang, La Union. The Balangiga Research Group's work was important in convincing US veterans to support the effort to return the bells. The group includes Borrinaga, British journalist Bob Couttie, and E. Jean Wall, the daughter of Adolph Gamlin, an American soldier of the 9th Infantry who survived the Filipino attack in 1901.

=== Senate Resolution 653 ===
In 2021, the Philippines Senate issued resolution 653 expressing "profound gratitude of the Senate of the Philippines for the return by the United States government of the bells and recognizing the efforts of those who facilitated its return." The resolution specifically acknowledged the efforts of Manila Archbishop Cardinal Luis Antonio Tagle, Rear Admiral Daniel W. McKinnon Jr., Captain Dennis L. Wright, and Captain Brian V. Buzzell, who led the initiative and provided information on the law and history related to the bells' presence in Wyoming and South Korea. The resolution also acknowledged that “the US-Philippine Society through Mr. Edwin Mason (Hank) Henderson, Dr. Henry B. Howard, and Ms. Ludmilla L. Kasulke, Esq. also played a key role in the return of the bells...arranging the refurbishment and transportation of the Bells, and providing duplicate Bells to honor the 9th Infantry Regiment”. The resolution also noted that “The US Department of Defense through the efforts of Lieutenant Colonel Theodore T. Liebreich of the United States Army, Dr. Joseph H. Felter, Deputy Secretary of Defense, and Secretary of Defense, James Mattis, returned the Bells of Balangiga to the people of Balangiga”.

==== 2026 congressional visit ====
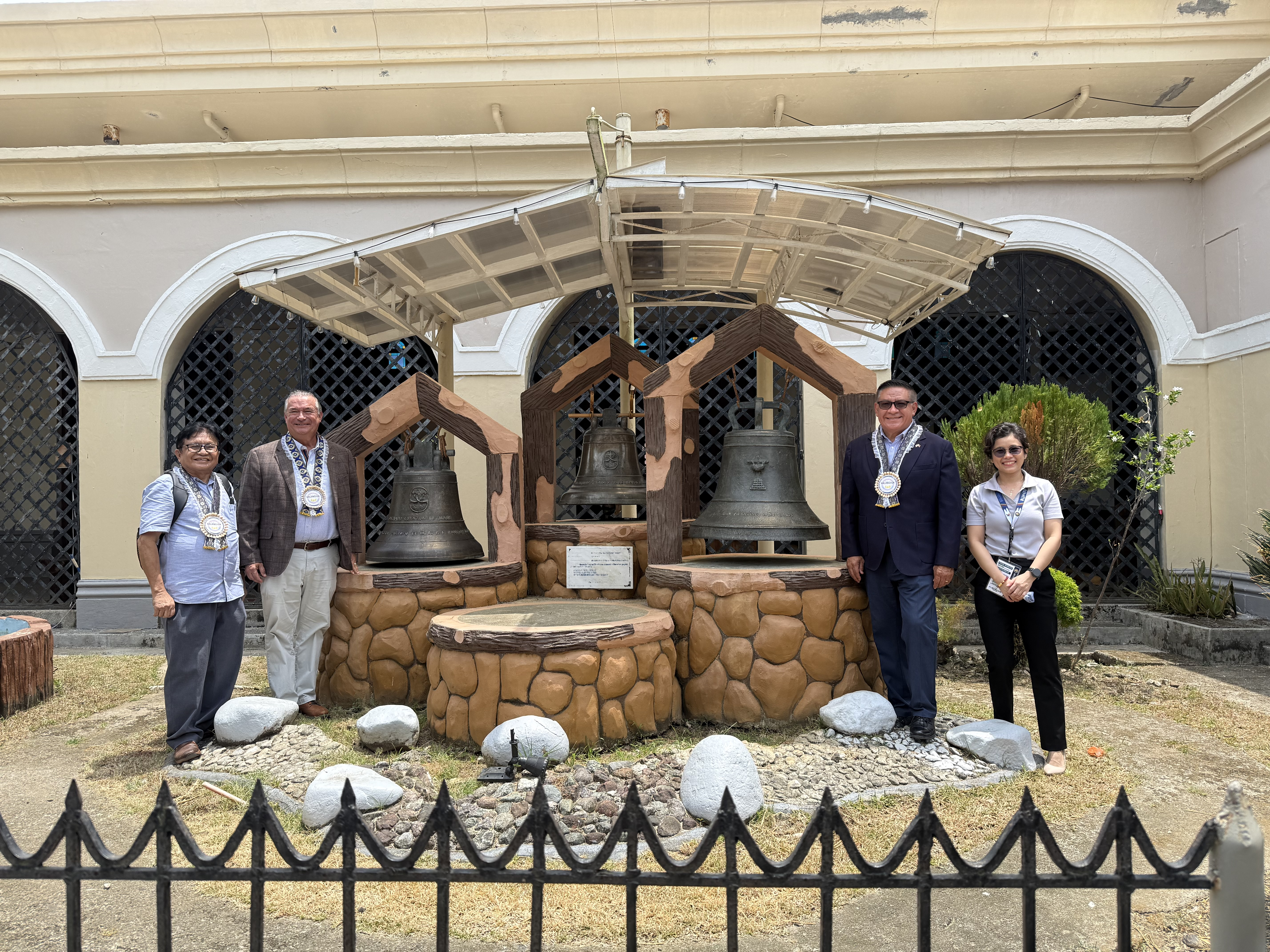
Representatives Bacon and Carbajal with the Balangiga bells, August 2026

On August 26, 2026, Bacon and Representative Salud Carbajal (D-California) visited the bells at the Church of San Lorenzo de Martir during a congressional delegation visit to the Philippines. The delegation was received on arrival by the mayor of Balangiga, toured the site with historian Rolando Borrinaga, and met with the parish priest.

== Contrary opinion ==
Eugenio Roy Daza, the grandson of Captain Eugenio Daza, a member of Vicente Lukbán's staff who helped organize the surprise attack on the 9th Infantry garrison in 1901, claims that based on the memoirs of his grandfather and on documents he found in US archives, the American soldiers took but a single bell; the bells that had been displayed in Wyoming came not from the Balangiga Church, but from other churches in the Philippines.

The Bangahon church bell of Gandara, Samar is believed to be one of the creation along with the Balangiga bells. This bell was sequestered by the Americans on September 29, 1901, at Balangiga.

== See also ==
- Agusan image
- History of the Philippines (1898–1946)
