= Narciso Abuke =

Philippine Revolution Army officer

Cabeza del Pueblo (Mayor) of Catarman
- In office 1912–1916

Military service
- Allegiance: First Philippine Republic; Katipunan
- Branch/service: Philippine Revolutionary Army
- Years of service: c. 1896–1902
- Rank: Teniente Coronel (Lieutenant Colonel)
- Commands: Northern Samar
- Battles/wars: Philippine Revolution; Philippine–American War

Narciso Abuke was a Lieutenant Colonel in the Philippine Revolutionary Army during the Philippine-American War. He was Area Commander of General Lukbán's forces for Northern Samar. After the war, he helped establish peace and order in Samar, in the transition to American governance. Abuke is credited for killing Pedro de la Cruz, the fighting leader of the Pulahan. He was Mayor of Catarman, Northern Samar.

== Military career ==
=== Philippine-American War ===
In the Philippine-American War, Abuke held the rank of Lieutenant Colonel and was given command of Northern Samar.

On February 15, 1900, Abuke left Laguan for Bido, a small town along the Catubig River. 5 days later, American Major J.C. Gilmore arrived with orders to occupy Laguan. However, upon learning of Abuke's presence, Gilmore formed a hunting party to hunt Abuke immediately. As Gilmore neared Bido on a steamer, Abuke along with 60 men and 40 guns, fired on them. Gilmore and his men returned fire, killing one of Abuke's men and injuring 3 including Abuke who sustained a minor shoulder injury. Abuke and his men retreated to Catubig. Catubig was a key strategic position. It was the main source of rice for the area, located at the heart of Northeastern Samar and brought access to all the towns along the river.

==== Surrender ====
On April 26, 1902, Gen. Claro Guevarra, who took command of Samar following General Lukbán's capture, surrendered Samar to Major-General Frederick D.Grant.

On April 27, 1902, Gen. Claro Guevarra, Abuke and the other officers took the Oath of Allegiance to the United States.

== Political career ==
Major-General Frederick D. Grant seeing the difficulty in restoring order to Samar, gave Abuke, Col. Rafael and Maj. Eugenio Daza, active roles in securing Samar. They were each given a district where they were responsible for the return of displaced peoples to their communities. They were tasked with encouraging reconstruction, convincing the principales to swear an oath to the U.S. and organizing local government. With the support of Abuke, MG Grant established the provincial government of Samar with municipal governments and representatives from all but one of the towns, in only forty-nine days. A feat that MG Grant writes considering the challenges "a triumph for the Army".

Governor George Curry, the American governor of Samar, appointed Daza and Abuke as Captains of the Samar Philippine Constabulary. Daza oversaw East-Samar and Abuke West-Samar. As captains they appointed subordinate officers and enlisted men. They led companies of 100 armed men each. During their time Daza and Abuke captured leaders and bandits of the Pulahan. Abuke is credited with killing their fighting leader, Pedro de la Cruz and 20 of his men.
