= Eugenio Daza =

Filipino revolutionary, teacher

Don Eugenio Daza
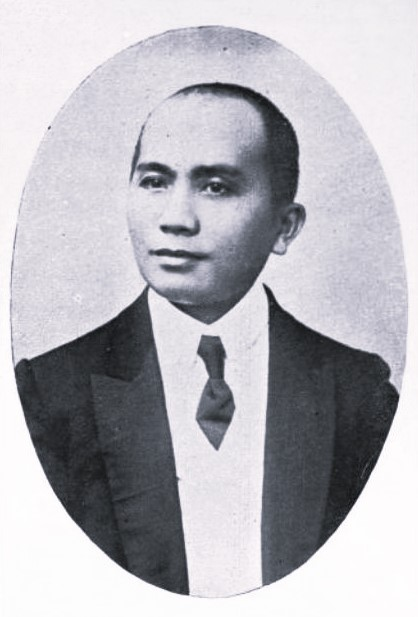
- First Philippine Assembly Portrait circa 1908

Member of the Philippine Assembly from Samar's 3rd district
- In office October 16, 1907 – October 16, 1909
- Preceded by: District established
- Succeeded by: Eladio Cinco

Personal details
- Born: Eugenio Daza y Salazar; November 15, 1870 Borongan, Samar, Captaincy General of the Philippines, Spanish Empire
- Died: December 16, 1954 (aged 84) Calamba, Laguna, Philippines
- Party: Nacionalista
- Spouse: Carolina Cinco
- Children: 7 See children Gabriel Daza; Carlota Daza; Cirilo Daza; Jesus Daza; Rosario Daza; Maria Daza; Juan Daza
- Education: Escuela Normal de Maestros, Manila
- Profession: Educator; Military Leader; Politician
- Religion: Roman Catholicism
- Nickname: Utak (Brain)

Military service
- Allegiance: First Philippine Republic; Katipunan
- Branch/service: Philippine Revolutionary Army
- Years of service: 1896–1902
- Rank: Comandante (Major)
- Commands: Southeastern Samar
- Battles/wars: Philippine Revolution; Philippine–American War; Battle of Balangiga

Don Eugenio Daza y Salazar (November 15, 1870 – December 16, 1954) was a Filipino principale (nobleman) recognized by the National Commission for Culture and the Arts (NCCA) as the first maestro (teacher) in the Samar province. He was both an infantry major and procurement officer in the Philippine Republican Army during the Philippine-American War. He was area commander of General Lukbán's forces for Southeastern Samar and overall commander and tactician of the Battle of Balangiga.

After the war, he helped establish peace and order in Samar, in the transition to American governance. He was the congressman and Representative of Samar's 3rd District to the First Philippine Legislature. Daza was a leader in the Pulahan Campaign and his success is credited to having led to the overall victory of the campaign. Daza was one of the earliest advocates for the return of the Balangiga Bells. His 1935 memoir on the Balangiga Encounter aided in their eventual return.

== Early life and education ==
Daza was born November 15, 1870, in Borongan, Samar, to businessman Juan Cinco Daza and his wife, Doña Magdalena Campomanes Salazar. Daza had one younger brother named Inigo. Through Doña Magdalena's family, the Salazar's, Daza was a member of the Principalía (nobility) of Samar, giving him the title of Don. Daza earned a degree in education in 1888, at the Jesuit Escuela Normal de Maestros in Manila. He married Carolina Cinco, of Catbalogan, Samar, and later fathered seven children with her. In 1895, he established his school under Spanish administration in Borongan, becoming the first maestro (teacher) in Samar.

== Military career ==
=== Philippine Revolution ===
The Philippine Revolution against Spain began in August 1896. Just three months after the birth of Gabriel Daza, his first son, Daza, left Borongan for Catbalogan and joined the Katipunan (Revolutionaries) as an infantry officer of both the Visayan Command Group and Samar Command Group.

In 1898, the Spanish-American War overwhelmed Spain, allowing the Philippine Revolutionary Army to push out Spain and reconquer all but Manila, which was occupied by the Americans. Having defeated Spain, Aguinaldo issued the Philippine Declaration of Independence. However, six months later, in the 1898 Treaty of Paris, Spain ceded the Philippines to the United States. After two months, the Philippine-American War began.

=== Philippine-American War ===
In the Philippine-American War, Daza held the rank of Capitán de Infanteria (infantry captain). General Lukbán gave him command of his home region of Southeastern Samar. In addition to being an infantry officer, Daza was in charge of military administration in the region and oversaw the collection of taxes, food supplies, arms, and ammunition.

During the Philippine-American war, Daza's family moved to Catbalogan. Meanwhile, Daza hid in the mountains, and his wife Carolina Cinco would send rice to him. The Americans attempted to locate Daza by interrogating Carolina. During one of the interrogations, the Americans wanted to conduct a physical examination. They claimed it was to determine whether Carolina was pregnant, proving she was keeping contact with Daza. Carolina was able to resist the examination.

==== Battle of Balangiga ====
Daza is noted to have been the commander and tactician of the Battle of Balangiga along with Captain Valeriano Abanador.

On September 28, 1901, Philippine forces organized into seven companies outside Balangiga. The first company was under the command of Daza and Pedro Abayan. The battle was a Philippine victory and regarded as one of the largest American defeats in history. 54 of the 74 American soldiers of Company C 9th Infantry Regiment were killed; 18 were wounded. The battle was taken as an embarrassment and resulted in a brutal American retaliation. General Jacob H. Smith issued an infamous Kill and Burn order to "Kill Everyone Over Ten" the order was carried out in the March across Samar.

After the battle, Daza was promoted to Comandante (major) and given the nickname “Utak ng Paslangang Balangiga”—shortened to "Utak"— meaning "Brain of the Battle of Balangiga" or "Brain." American newspapers noted that 4 African-Americans and 2 white Americans defected to join Daza's ranks after the battle.

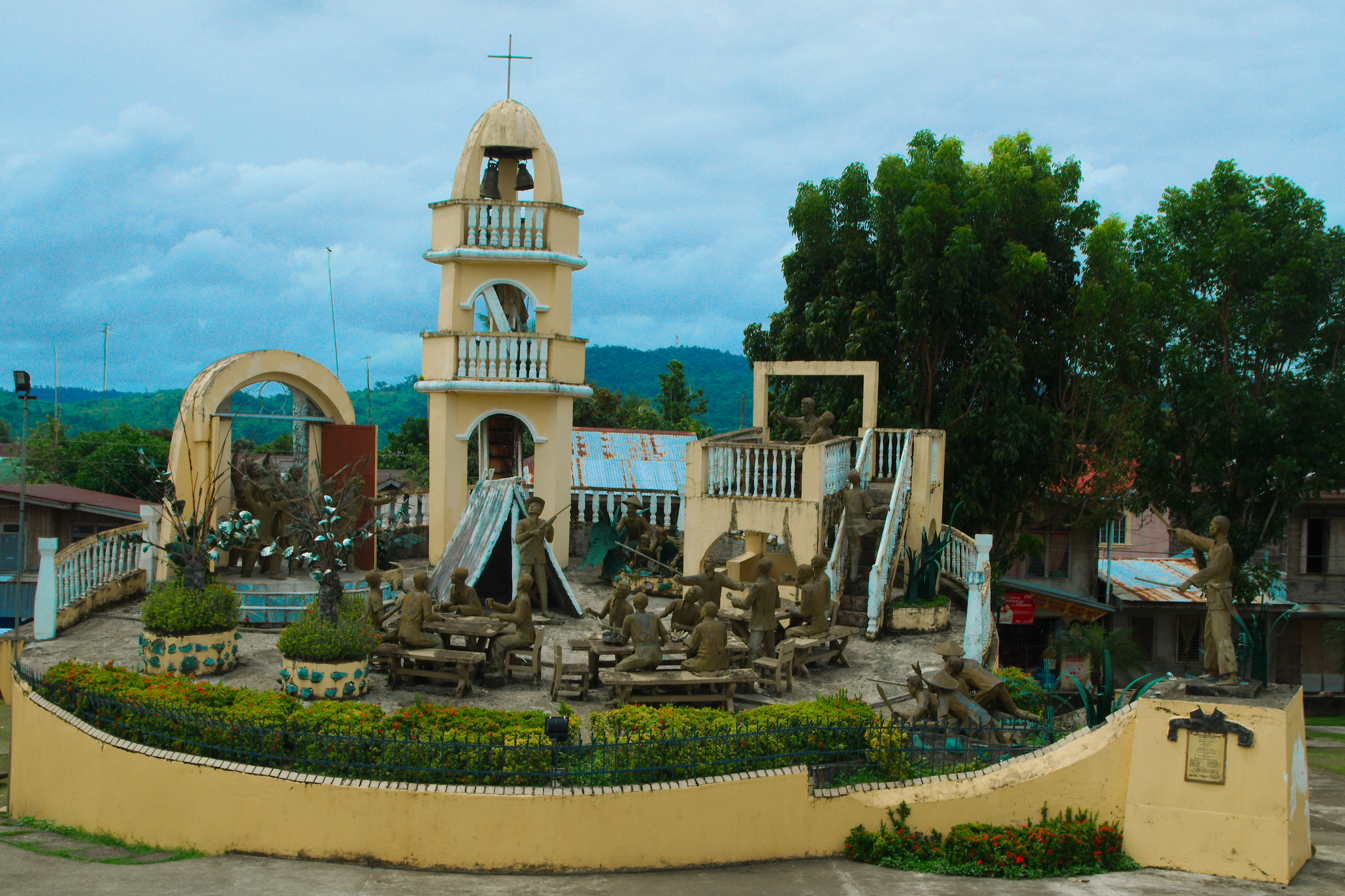
Balangiga Encounter Monument

==== Surrender ====
On April 26, 1902, Gen. Claro Guevarra, who took command of Samar following General Lukbán's capture, surrendered Samar to Major-General Frederick D.Grant; General Smith was also present.

On April 27, 1902, Daza and the Balangiga contingent were the last to arrive for the formal surrender at the Gándara river mouth in Catbalogan. Upon their arrival, the Americans noticed the contingent carried new Krag rifles, filled cartridge boxes, and American hats, raincoats, and boots, likely from their fallen at the Battle of Balangiga. With Daza's contingent's arrival, 745 revolutionaries were present: 66 officers, 236 riflemen and 443 boleros.

Two hours after Daza's arrival, the formal surrender began. Gen. Claro Guevarra, Daza, and the other officers took the Oath of Allegiance to the United States. During the ceremony, General Smith wrapped Daza with an American flag to "symbolize amnesty and welcome to the fold." Following the surrender Daza was given a pistol from MG Grant.

== Political career ==
=== Restoring Peace to Samar ===
Major-General Frederick D. Grant, seeing the difficulty in restoring order to Samar, gave Daza, Col. Rafael, and Abuke active roles in securing Samar. They were each given a district where they were responsible for the return of displaced peoples to their communities. They were tasked with encouraging reconstruction, convincing the principales to swear an oath to the U.S. and organizing the local government. The principalía were the noble ruling class of the Philippines. Daza, being part of the principalía himself, was vital in convincing them to comply. With the support of Daza, MG Grant established the provincial government of Samar with municipal governments and representatives from all but one of the towns, in only forty-nine days. A feat that MG Grant writes, considering the challenges, was "a triumph for the Army."

==== Pulahan Campaign ====
In 1906, Governor George Curry, the American governor of Samar, appointed Daza and Lt. Col. Narciso Abuke as captains of a citizens' committee in the Samar Philippine Constabulary. Daza oversaw East-Samar and Abuke West-Samar. As captains, they appointed subordinate officers and enlisted men. Many of the men Daza recruited served under him in Balangiga. Daza and Abuke led companies of 100 armed men each. During their time, they captured leaders and bandits of the Pulahan. Daza negotiated with, and arrested, Cipriano "Teducduc" Amango the leader of the Southeastern Samar Pulahan and leader of the Magtaon Attack. Teducduc was formerly a revolutionary under Daza during the Philippine-American War.

In the barrio of Napta-an, Daza and his men encountered a major group of Pulahanes. Daza's victory here is credited as the victory that led to the eventual defeat of the Pulahan in Samar.

=== First Philippine Legislature ===
As a founding member of the Nacionalista Party, Daza was elected congressman by the people of Samar, to represent Samar's 3rd District to the First Philippine Legislature as a member of the Philippine Assembly from 1907 to 1909. Daza was one of seven teachers that were elected to the first Philippine Legislature, the others were Juan Alvear, Gabriel Lasam, Maximino Mina, Simeon Mobo, and Luciano Sinko who was also from Samar.

Daza's younger brother Don Iñigo would run for the same seat in 1922, but lost to Iñigo Abenis.

Daza was a member of the First Independence Congress, which commenced in 1930, and sought Philippine independence from the United States.

On October 6, 1945, President Osmeña appointed Daza Acting Councilor of Borongan, Samar.

== Memoir ==
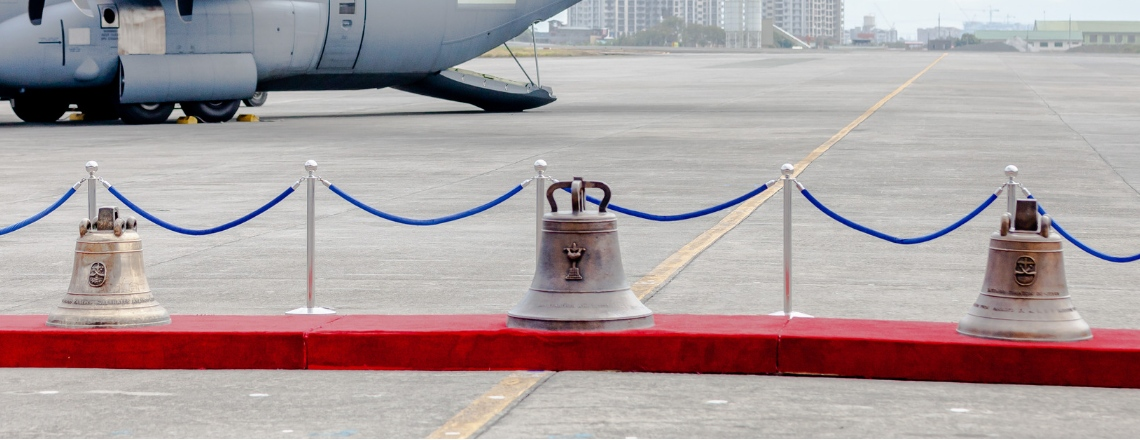
Balangiga bells on display during a repatriation ceremony at Villamor Air Base

On December 23, 1935, Daza gave a sworn statement detailing the Balangiga Encounter and the surrounding events, entitled "Balangiga su Historia en la Revolucion el 28 de Septiembre la 1901".

Daza's memoir was used as part of the request for the return of the Balangiga Bells seized by the United States Army following the Encounter. Daza's Memoir ended with:

...one of the bells which were rung on that memorable day of the heroic battle, was taken by the Americans to the United States. Could we secure its return? That depends on the patriotism of our leaders and the good will of the American people.

The bells were returned on December 11, 2018.

== Personal life ==
Daza married Carolina Cinco, of Catbalogan, Samar, and later fathered seven children with her. His eldest, Gabriel, founded the Boy Scouts of the Philippines. His second eldest son, Cirilo, and his youngest Juan followed his military footsteps serving in WWII with Cirilo serving as a captain and Barracks Commander of Subgroup XIII Group IV under then Brig. Gen. Vicente Lim, and Juan serving as a Guerilla Major in the Counter Intelligence Propaganda Corps, in charge of the Hunter Town Units. Cirilo later became a Colonel in the Philippine Army and a member of the Defenders of Bataan. Juan was later promoted to Lt. Colonel in the Philippine Army and became a member of the board of directors for the Hunters Veterans Legion in Manila.

== Death and legacy ==
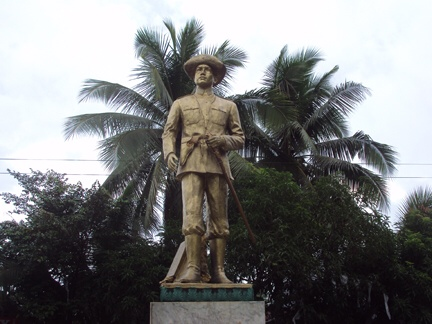
Eugenio S. Daza Monument, Rawis Rd, Borongan

Daza died in Calamba, Laguna on December 16, 1954, at the age of 84. By request, his body was buried in Borongan, Samar, on December 28, 1954. The ceremony was officiated by Cardinal Julio Rosales, who at the time was Archbishop of Cebu.

=== “Eugenio Daza Day” ===
Daza's birthday, November 15, is celebrated as Eugenio Daza day, in Eastern Samar. Annually declared by Presidents Corazon Aquino and Fidel Ramos, the day was made permanent by President Joseph Estrada. Originally "Don Eugenio Daza Day", the Don was dropped under President Gloria Macapagal Arroyo.

=== "Balangiga Encounter Day" ===
In 1989, "Balangiga Encounter Day" was established as a provincial holiday in Eastern Samar to celebrate the Balangiga Encounter victory.

=== Armed Forces of the Philippines ===
On October 2, 1991, AFP Chief General Lisandro Abadia issued a general order renaming the home of the 801st Infantry Brigade, 8th Infantry Division, Philippine Army to Camp Maj. Eugenio S. Daza. The camp is in Brgy Fatima, Hinabangan, Samar.

=== Tributes and memorials ===
- Eugenio S. Daza Monument, Rawis Rd, Borongan.
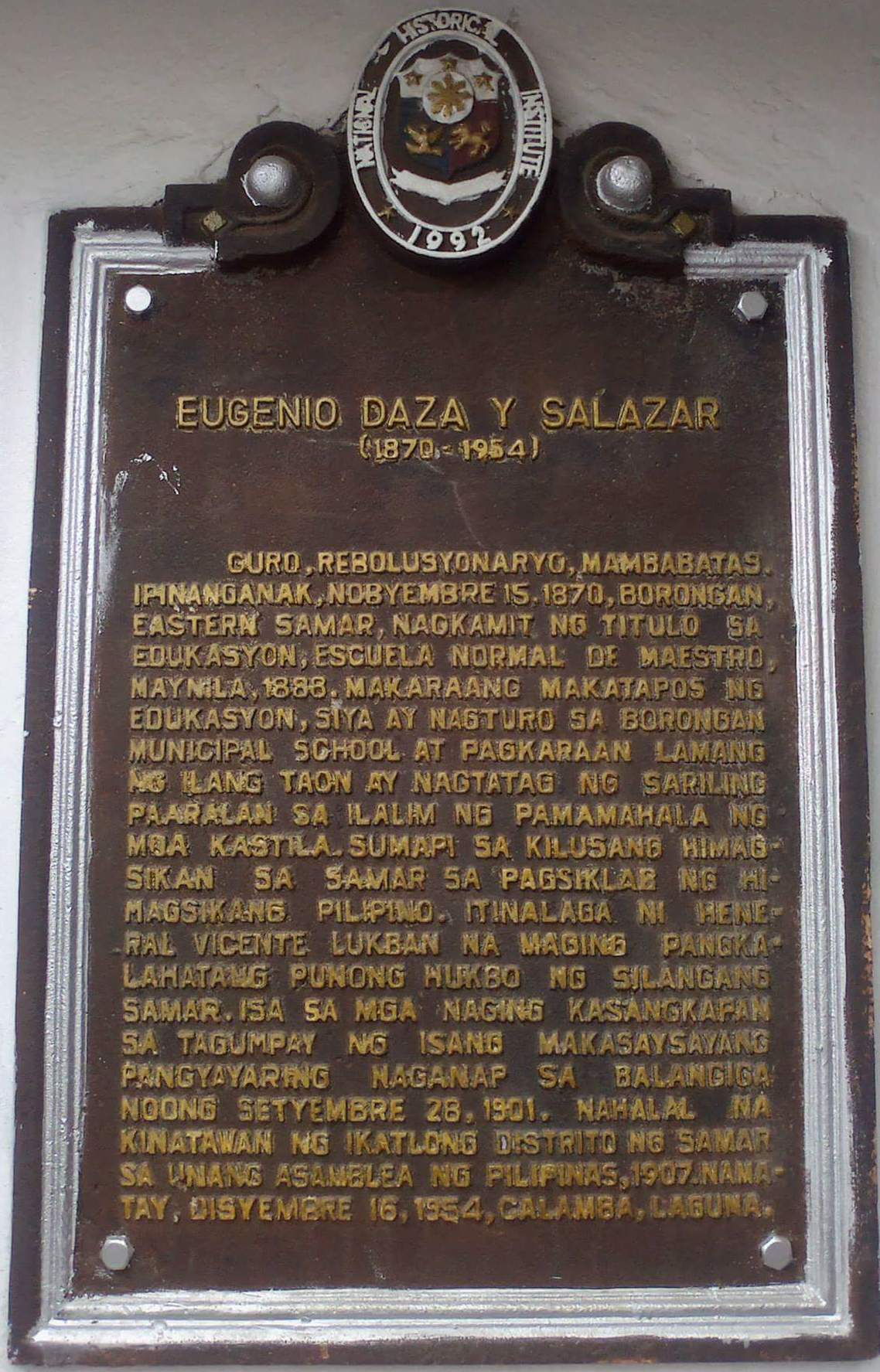
- Eugenio Daza NHI Historical Marker
  Eugenio Daza Y Salazar Historical Marker by the NHCP, at the base of his monument.
- Eugenio S. Daza Pilot Elementary School, Barangay G, Borongan. It was founded in 1916.

=== Portrayals ===
- In Malvar (in production)
