= Balangiga massacre =

1901 atrocity in the Philippine-American War

- Part of the post-war insurgency phase of the Philippine–American War
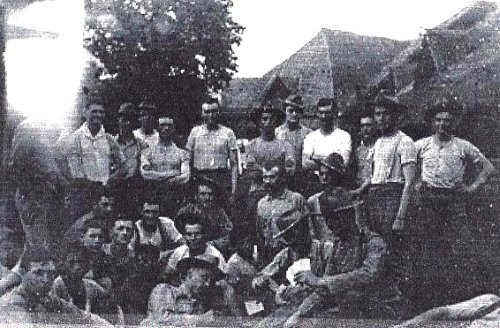
- Members of Company C, 9th US Infantry Regiment posing with Mayor Valeriano Abanador and another town official
Date	September 28, 1901; 125 years ago
Location	Balangiga, Samar, Philippines 11°06′34″N 125°23′09″E
Result	Philippine nationalist victory

Belligerents
Philippine nationalists (Note: The First Philippine Republic, previously the mother organization of these irregular forces, had effectively ceased to exist with the capture in March of 1901 of its president, Emilio Aguinaldo by US forces and his subsequent pledge of allegiance to the United States and the acceptance of its sovereignty throughout the Philippines. (See Emilio Aguinaldo § Capture of Aguinaldo for more information.))	United States

Commanders and leaders
Vicente Lukban; Eugenio Daza; Valeriano Abanador (Note: Two participants in the attack named the following persons as the chief organizers of the military operation: Pedro Abayan, Mayor of Balangiga; Adronico Balais, Vice Mayor; Valeriano Abanador, Chief of Police; Mariano Valdenor, Assistant Chief of Police; Captain Eugenio Daza, Area Commander of General Vicente Lukban's forces for Southeastern Samar; Pedro Duran, a Sergeant under Diaz; Juan Salazar; Evangelista Gabornes, Councilor; Paulo Gavan Gacho; Other sources showed that, while General Lukban viewed Daza as the overall commander, Daza acknowledged Abanador's operational command of the attack. Of the revolutionaries, Casiana Nacionales was the only woman involved.)	2nd. Lt. Thomas W. Connell †; Maj. Richard S. Griswold †; 1st Lt. Edward A. Bumpus †

Units involved
Philippine Republican Army, irregular military forces	Company C (9th Infantry Regiment)

Strength
500 irregular military forces bolo troops in seven attack units	Philippine attack: 74 men American attack: 400 men

Casualties and losses
22 wounded	54 killed 18 wounded

The Balangiga massacre was an incident in which the residents of the town of Balangiga on the Philippines island of Samar conducted a surprise attack on an occupying unit of the US 9th Infantry, killing 54. It is also known as the Battle of Balangiga, Balangiga encounter, Balangiga incident, or Balangiga conflict. The incident occurred on September 28, 1901, over five months after the April 19 publication of a "Peace Manifesto" by Emilio Aguinaldo acknowledging and accepting the sovereignty of the United States throughout the Philippines. Some Filipino historians have asserted that the term Balangiga Massacre more appropriately refers to actions ordered in retaliation by American General Jacob H. Smith during the pacification of Samar that resulted in an estimated 2,000 Filipino civilians killed and over 200 homes burned.

== Background ==
The battle was a military operation planned by Captain Eugenio Daza (an area commander of Captain General Vicente Lukbán's forces in southeastern Samar) and transpired in Balangiga in 1901 during the Philippine–American War. (Note: Both Lukban and Gaza had been officers in the Philippine Revolutionary Army before that organization was dispersed on November 13, 1899 in favor of guerilla warfare.) The attack was led by Valeriano Abanador, who was the Jefe de la Policía (Chief of Police).

== The operation ==
=== Prelude ===
Samar was a major center for the production of Manila hemp, the trade of which was financing Philippine forces on the island. At the same time United States interests were eager to secure control of the hemp trade, which was a vital material both for the United States Navy and American agro-industries such as cotton.

Filipino forces in the area were under the command of Captain General Vicente Lukbán who had been sent there in December 1898 to govern the island on behalf of the First Philippine Republic under Emilio Aguinaldo. Aguinaldo had been captured by American forces on March 23, 1901. On April 1, he had sworn allegiance to the US and told his followers to lay down their arms and give up the fight.

On May 30, 1901, prior to the stationing of any Americans in Balangiga, town mayor Pedro Abayan had written to Lukban pledging to "observe a deceptive policy with [Americans] doing whatever they may like, and when a favorable opportunity arises, the people will strategically rise against them."

In the summer of 1901, Brigadier General Robert P. Hughes, who commanded the Department of the Visayas and was responsible for Samar, instigated an aggressive policy of food deprivation and property destruction on the island. The objective was to force the end of Philippine resistance. Part of his strategy was to close three key ports on the southern coast, Basey, Balangiga and Guiuan prevent supplies from reaching Lukban's forces in the interior. Company C was to close the port at Balangiga.

On August 11, 1901, Company C of the 9th US Infantry Regiment, arrived in Balangiga—the third largest town on the southern coast of Samar island—to close its port and prevent supplies reaching Philippine forces in the interior, Abaya's letter to Lukban had been among papers captured by American troops on August 18; it read, in translation:

As a representative of this town of Balangiga I have the honor to let you know, after having conferred with the principals of the town about the policy to be pursued with the enemy in case they come in, we have agreed to have a fictitious policy with them, doing whatever they may like, and when the occasion comes the people will strategically rise against them.

This I communicate to you for your superior knowledge, begging of you to make known all the army your favorable approval of the same, if you think it convenient.

May God preserve you many years,
Balangiga, 30th of May, 1901

P. ABAYAN, Local President

However, this information never reached the American troops in Balangiga.

Relations between the soldiers and the townspeople seemed amicable for the first month of the American presence in the town; indeed it was marked by extensive fraternization between the two parties. This took the form of tuba (palm wine) drinking among the soldiers and male villagers, baseball games, and arnis demonstrations. However, tensions rose due to several reasons: Captain Thomas W. Connell, commanding officer of the American unit in Balangiga, ordered the town cleaned up in preparation for a visit by the US Army's inspector-general. However, in complying with his directive, the townspeople inadvertently cut down vegetation with food value, in violation of Lukbán's policies regarding food security. As a consequence, on September 18, 1901, around 400 guerrillas sent by Lukbán appeared in the vicinity of Balangiga. They were to take actions against town officials and local residents for violating Lukbán's orders regarding food security and for fraternizing with the Americans. The threat was probably defused by Captain Eugenio Daza, a member of Lukbán's staff, and by the parish priest, Father Donato Guimbaolibot.

A few days later, Connell had the town's male residents rounded up and detained for the purpose of hastening his clean-up operations. Around 80 men were kept in two Sibley tents unfed overnight. In addition, Connell had the men's bolos and the stored rice for their tables confiscated. These events sufficiently insulted and angered the townspeople, and they planned revenge against the Americans.

A few days before the attack, Valeriano Abanador, the town's police chief, and Captain Daza met to plan the attack on the American unit. To address the issue of sufficient manpower to offset the Americans' advantage in firepower, Abanador and Daza disguised the congregation of men as a work force aimed at preparing the town for a local fiesta which, incidentally, also served to address Connell's preparations for his superior's visit. Abanador also brought in a group of "tax evaders" to bolster their numbers. Much palm wine was brought in to ensure that the American soldiers would be drunk the day after the fiesta. Hours before the attack, women and children were sent away to safety. To mask the disappearance of the women from the dawn service in the church, 34 men from Barrio Lawaan cross-dressed as women worshippers led by Casiana Nacionales, a mamaratbat (prayer leader), who recited the devotional prayers to make the procession believable. These "women", carrying small coffins, were challenged by Sergeant Scharer of the sentry post about the town plaza near the church. Opening one of the coffins with his bayonet, he saw the body of a dead child who, he was told, was a victim of a cholera epidemic. Abashed, he let the women pass on. Unbeknownst to the sentries, the other coffins hid the bolos and other weapons of the attackers.

There is much conflict between accounts by members of Company C. That day, the 27th, was the 52nd anniversary of the founding of the parish, an occasion on which an image of a recumbent Christ known as a Santo Entierro would have been carried around the parish. In modern times these Santo Entierros are enclosed in a glass case but at the time were commonly enclosed in a wooden box.

=== Attack on American soldiers ===
The US 9th Infantry Regiment in the Philippines, 1899

Between 6:20 and 6:45 in the morning of September 28, 1901, the villagers made their move. Abanador, who had been supervising the prisoners' communal labor in the town plaza, grabbed the rifle of Private Adolph Gamlin, one of the American sentries, and stunned him with a blow to the head. This served as the signal for the rest of the communal laborers in the plaza to rush the other sentries and soldiers of Company C, who were mostly having breakfast in the mess area. Abanador then gave a shout, signaling the other Philippine men to the attack, and fired Gamlin's rifle at the mess tent, hitting one of the soldiers. The pealing of the church bells and the sounds from conch shells being blown followed seconds later. Some of the Company C troopers were attacked and hacked to death before they could grab their rifles; the few who survived the initial onslaught fought almost bare-handed, using kitchen utensils, steak knives, and chairs. One private used a baseball bat to fend off the attackers before being overwhelmed.

The men detained in the Sibley tents broke out and made their way to the municipal hall. Simultaneously, the attackers hidden in the church broke into the parish house and killed the three American officers there. An unarmed Company C soldier was ignored, as was Captain Connell's Philippine houseboy. The attackers initially occupied the parish house and the municipal hall; however, the attack at the mess tents and the barracks failed, with Pvt. Gamlin, recovering consciousness and managing to secure another rifle, causing considerable casualties among the Philippine forces. With the initial surprise wearing off and the attack degrading, Abanador called for the attackers to break off and retreat. The surviving Company C soldiers, led by Sergeant Frank Betron, escaped by sea to Basey and Tanauan, Leyte. The townspeople buried their dead and abandoned the town.

Of the 74 men in Company C, 36 were killed in action, including all its commissioned officers: Captain Thomas W. Connell, First Lieutenant Edward A. Bumpus and Major Richard S. Griswold. Twenty-two were wounded in action and four were missing in action. Eight died later of wounds received in combat; only four escaped unscathed. The villagers captured about 100 rifles and 25,000 rounds of ammunition and suffered 28 dead and 22 wounded.

== Aftermath ==
This was described as the worst defeat of United States Army soldiers since the Battle of the Little Bighorn in 1876.

== Legacy ==
The attack and subsequent actions on Samar have been some of the longest-running and most controversial issues between the Philippines and the United States. Conflicting interpretations by American and Philippine historians have confused the issue. The attack has been termed Balangiga Massacre in many English language sources. However, Philippine historian Teodoro Agoncillo has asserted that the term Balangiga massacre properly refers to the burning of the town by US forces following the attack and to retaliatory acts during the March across Samar. Other Philippine sources also employ this usage. In US sources, however, the term massacre is used to refer to this attack.

== Factual disputes ==
Mutilation of the bodies of the Americans who were killed was reported in testimony before the US Senate Committee on the Philippines and information about that has appeared elsewhere. The asserted mutilations have been disputed by historian George Borrinaga with a counter-assertion to the effect that Filipinos have respect for the dead, he says, and would do no such thing.

Several asserted factual inaccuracies in early published accounts have surfaced over the years as historians continue to re-investigate the Balangiga incident. These include:

- Schott and Rey Imperial assert that Company C of the 9th US Infantry was sent to Balangiga in response to a request by its then-Mayor Pedro Abayan. This is based solely on a claim by George Meyer, a Company C survivor, in support of efforts to secure the Medal of Honor. Author Bob Couttie asserts that the American unit was sent there to close Balangiga's port.
- James Taylor's account inspired another author, William T. Sexton, to write that the American soldiers were "butchered like hogs" in Soldiers in the Sun. However, Eugenio Daza wrote, "The Filipino believes that the profanation of the dead necessarily brings bad luck and misfortune ... there was no time to lose for such acts [after the Balangiga attack]."

== Gallery ==
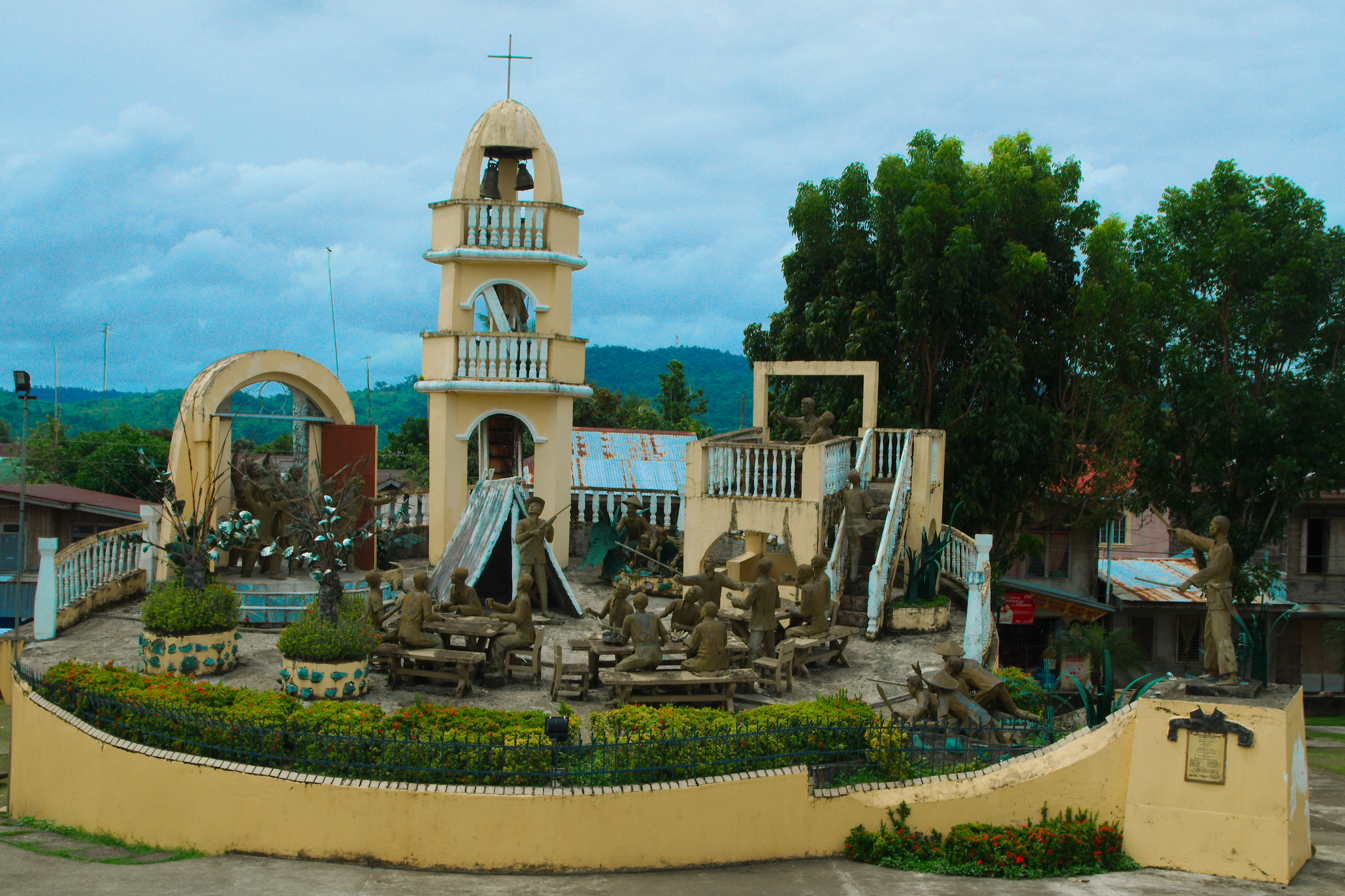
Battle of Balangiga monument

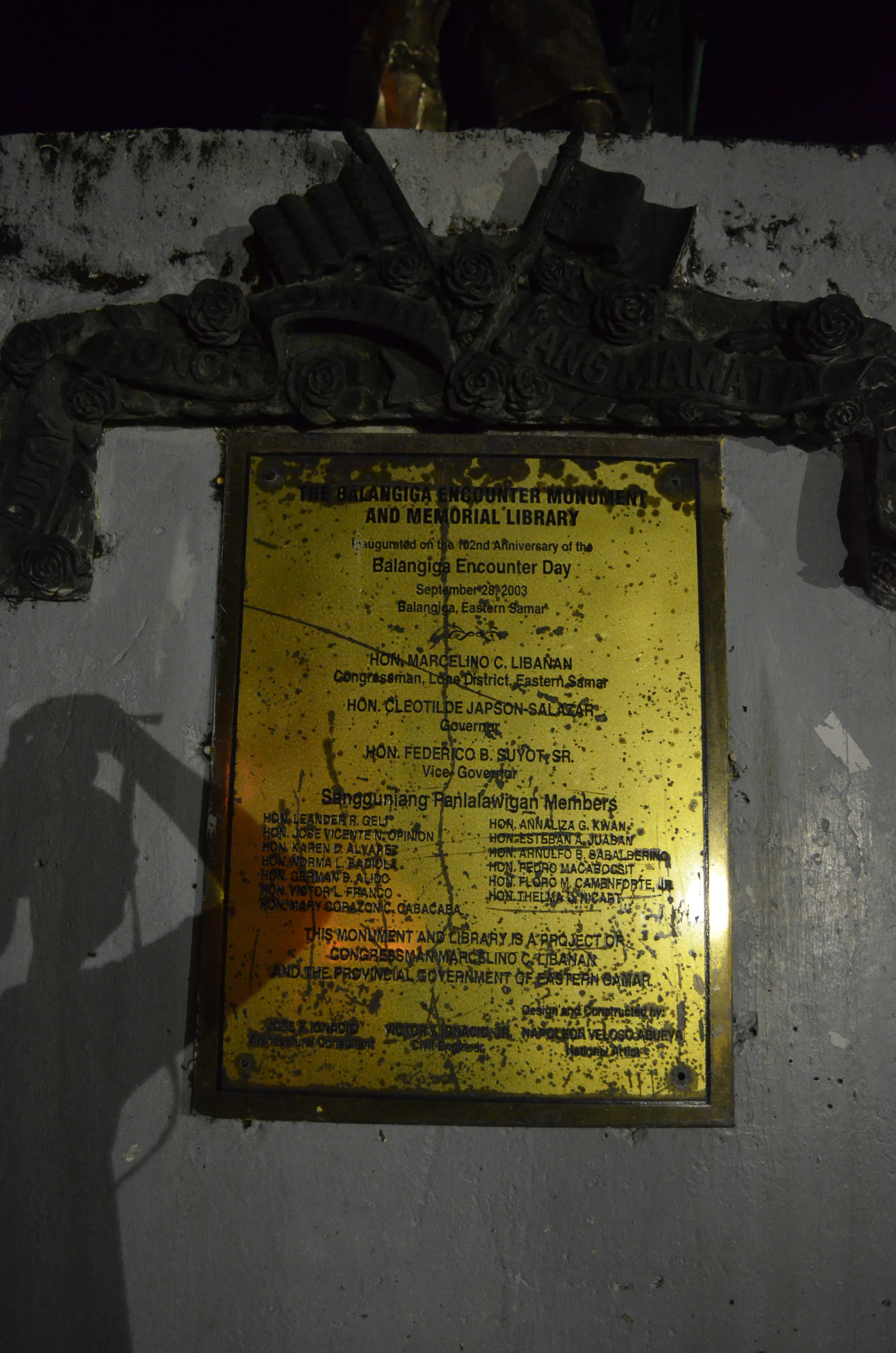
Battle of Balangiga memorial marker

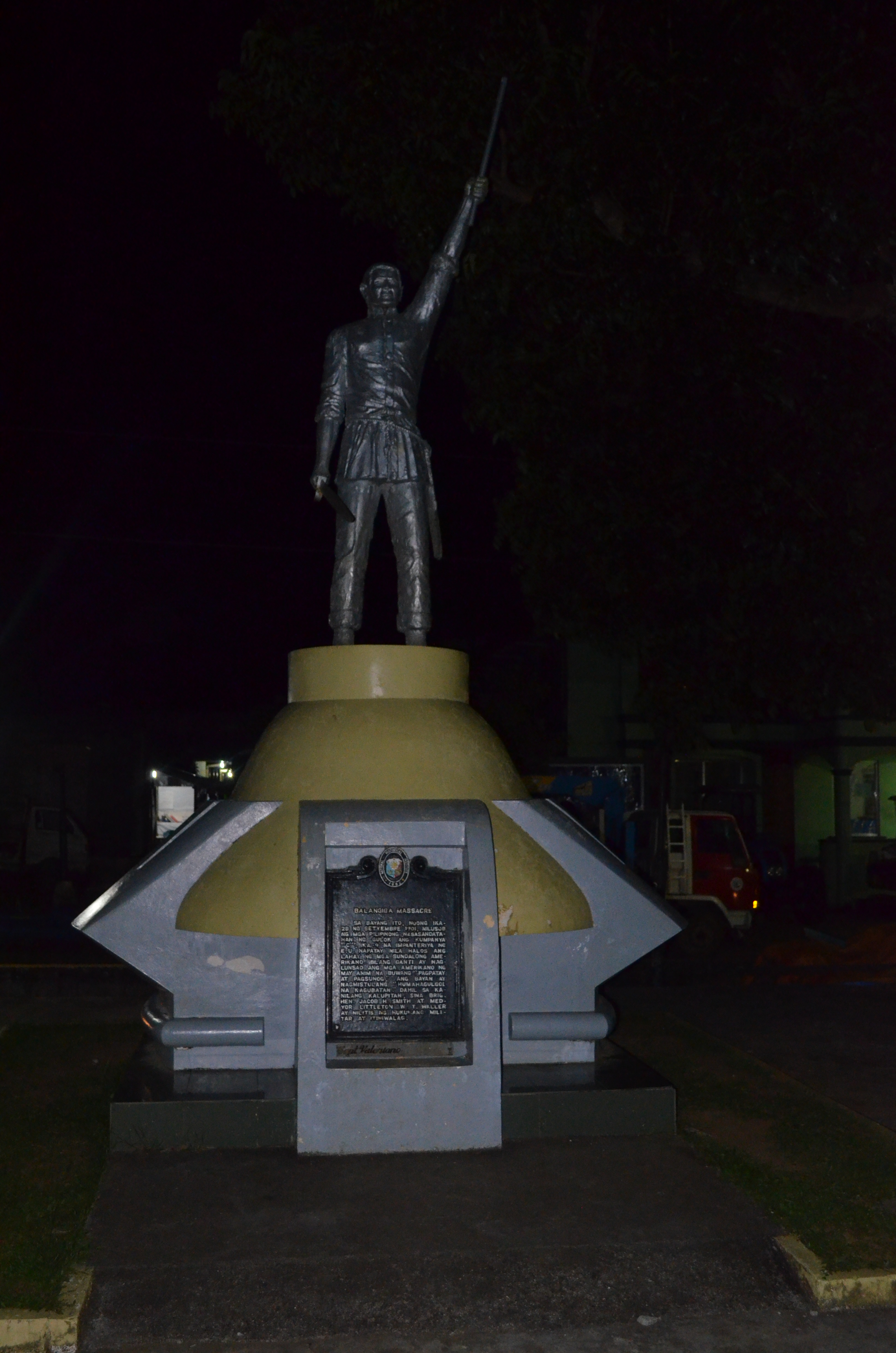
Statue of Valeriano Abanador, Balangiga police chief during the Battle of Balangiga

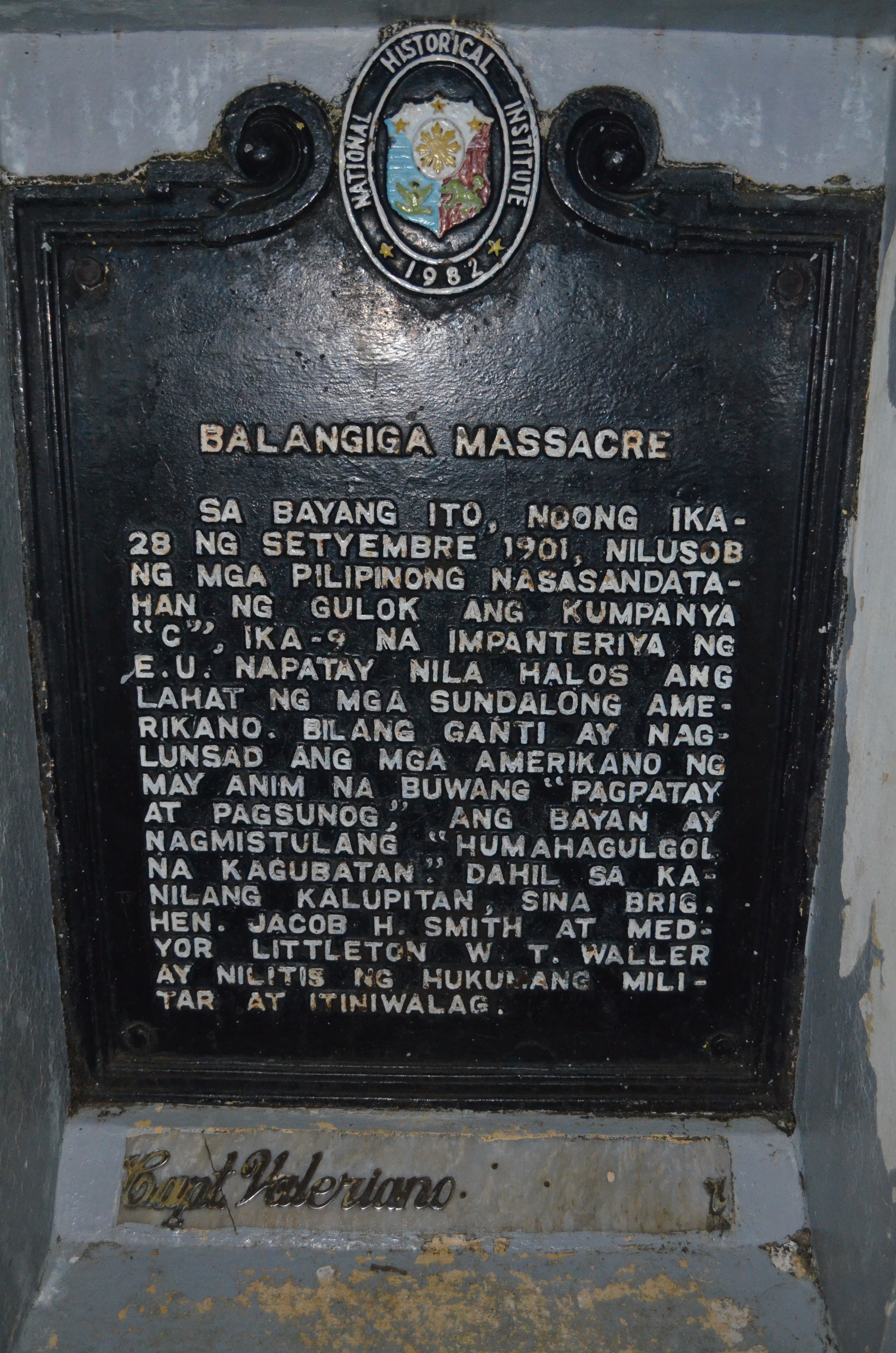
Historical marker at the foot of Abanador statue (Note: Translation: In this town, on September 20, 1901, Filipinos armed with muskets ambushed company "C", E.U. infantry. [sic: U.S.] they killed almost all the American soldiers. In response, the Americans launched a six-day "killing and burning" that turned the town into a "howling forest", Brig. Gen. Jacob H. Smith and Major Littleton W T. Waller were tried by court martial and dismissed.)

== Cultural references ==
- Gina Apostol, Insurrecto (Soho Press, 2018)

== See also ==
- Balangiga bells, on the taking of the bells as spoils of war in 1901 and their return to the Philippines in 2018
- Campaigns of the Philippine–American War
- Eugenio Daza
- History of the Philippines (1898–1946)
- Vicente Lukban
- Timeline of the Philippine–American War
