= Battle of Dolores River =

1904 Philippine–American War battle

- Part of the post-war insurgency phase of the Philippine–American War
Date	December 12, 1904
Location	Eastern Samar, Philippines
Result	Pulahan victory

Belligerents
Pulahanes	United States

Commanders and leaders
Pedro de la Cruz	Stephen K. Hayt †

Strength
1,000 Pulahan fighters	43 troops of the 38th Philippine Constabulary Scouts

Casualties and losses
Around~ 300 killed, countless wounded	37 killed 38 rifles and countless rounds of ammunition captured

The Battle of Dolores River was an armed confrontation during the later part of the Philippine–American War, in which U.S. forces on the island of Samar launched a failed expedition against Pulahan militants.

== Background ==
The Pulahanes in July 1904 slaughtered the people of Taviran and then burned the town of Santa Elena. In December, over a thousand Pulahanes besieged a detachment of native scouts in the town of Taft.

== Battle ==
In December 1904, the 38th Philippine Constabulary Scouts, under Lieutenant Stephen Hayt, were on patrol along the Dolores River in an attempt to link up with the 37th Constabulary Scouts and another Constable Company led by Lieutenant Hendryx.

The 38th was ambushed en route, by over 1,000 Pulahanes. As the Pulahanes rushed, waving colorful banners and shouting "Tad-Tad!" (Tadtad!, meaning "Cut To Pieces!") they were met with a volley of rifle-fire that stopped their advance. The Constables held their ground and repelled the attacks, inflicting heavy losses with accurate and steady rifle fire.

The Pulahanes were far greater in number, however, and they eventually enveloped and wiped out the entire scout force.

== Aftermath ==
Of the 43-man contingent, the officer and 37 of his men were killed. The Pulajans on the other hand, suffered much heavier losses. Estimates range as high as 300 dead before the Constabulary fell.

The Pulajan fighters were able to capture 38 Krag rifles, along with a large amount of ammunition.
