= Pulahan =

Religious movement in the Philippines

Total population
- Currently none; 10,000–15,000 (c.1900)

Founder
- Dios Buhawi

Regions with significant populations
- (Visayas)

Religions
- Folk Catholicism

Scriptures
- Bible, texts relating to Philippine mythology

Languages
- Visayan languages, Spanish, Tagalog

The Pulahan (literally "those wearing red" in Cebuano; Spanish: Pulajanes, hence "Pulahanes" in American sources), also known as Dios-dios, were the members of a religious revival of Philippine beliefs that developed in the Visayas prior to the Philippine Revolution. At its peak, it numbered around 10,000–15,000 adherents. The movement was severely crippled during the Philippine Revolution after the Philippine Constabulary took over patrols in Samar, when the U.S. military declared the island as "pacified".

== Description ==
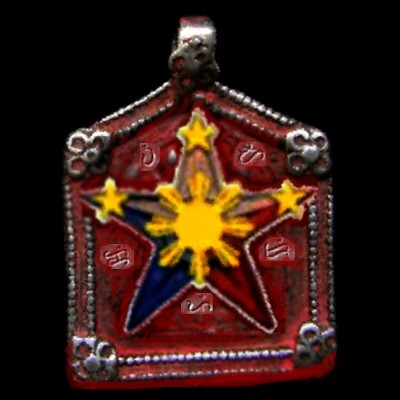
An agimat, intended to be worn with a necklace.

Pulahanes practiced a syncretic religious revival centered mostly on Philippine mythology and Folk Catholicism. Individual beliefs include the anting-antings as well as the revival of the babaylan. Indigenous fighting techniques such as eskrima were also used in the elite and ferocious combat style. They practiced a form indigenous martial arts called Derobio Eskrima and they specialize using a heavy, crescent-shaped bolo knife in their battles. Religious rituals using bottles of holy oil, prayer books such as the Bible, consecrated anting-anting, as blessings before battles.

Americans have described Pulahanes as notorious fighters and are experts in hand-to-hand combat. War cries were also common among their fighters. They have also been described as lacking in strategy due to their high casualty figures in battles such as the Massacre at Dolores. They were the subject of many laws passed during the early American colonial period and have often been accused of banditry. George Curry, Governor of Samar, wrote about the Pulahan in a 1907 report: "...Pulahanes are nearly all ignorant, superstitious persons, and are easily influenced for good or for evil. It is therefore necessary that they be closely watched and brought under our influence, to the end that within a few years they may no longer have the desire to lead a wild and lawless life. They are not naturally bad people, and I know that they can be reclaimed to civilization if brought under the influences mentioned above. Missionaries are badly needed for these people. They are all naturally religious and a good priest could exercise more influence over them than anyone else. "

== History ==
The 19th century saw the rise of the dios-dios "shamans". Dios-dios (literally "god pretender" or "false god", from Spanish dios) were religious leaders so named because of their penchant for identifying themselves with Christian religious figures. They led cult-like religious movements, promising prosperity, supernatural powers, or healing to their followers. Most were mere charlatans selling amulets and magical pieces of paper. Their members were mostly from the illiterate rural poor who had little knowledge of formal Catholic teachings and were living in extreme poverty under colonial rule. The dios-dios movement was initially purely religious.

There are numerous examples of dios-dios leaders in the 19th century. They include Lungao, a healer from Ilocos who claimed he was Jesus Christ in 1811; Ignacio Dimas, who led the "Tres Cristos" ("Three Christs") of Libmanan, Nueva Cáceres (modern Camarines Sur) who claimed they had supernatural powers over diseases in 1865; Benedicta, an old woman and a healer who called herself "La Santa de Leyte" ("The Saint of Leyte") in 1862 and prophesied that the island of Leyte would sink; Clara Tarrosa, an eighty-year-old babaylan in Tigbauan, Iloilo in the late 1880s who proclaimed herself the Virgin Mary and isolated herself and her followers from Spanish rule; Francisco Gonzalez (alias "Francisco Sales" or "Fruto Sales") of Jaro, Leyte who claimed in 1888 that he was a king sent to save people from another great flood by leading them to a city that would rise from the waves; and many more. These movements were usually suppressed by the Spanish by imprisoning their leaders or exiling them.

=== Dios-Dios Rebellions of the 19th century ===
The movement began in 1887, when Ponciano Elofre the Cabeza de Barangay of Zamboanguita, Negros Oriental, failed to collect all the taxes from his constituents. As a response Spanish soldiers beat his father, Cris Elofre, to death to teach him a lesson. Thereafter, he rallied the people against the forced payment of taxes to the Spanish government. His movement would soon incorporate religious freedom, as well as the celebration of the ancient rites of the babaylan (shaman), with the intention of reviving aspects of Philippine mythology. He renamed himself as Dios Buhawi (literally "Whirlwind God") and proclaimed himself the savior of the people. Emulating the ancient asog shamans, he dressed in women's clothing and assumed feminine mannerisms even though he was married to a woman. He claimed supernatural powers much like the ancient dalagangan. He called his followers "Pulahanes", who numbered about 2,000 (whom the Spanish authorities called the babaylanes) and would regularly attack Spanish-controlled towns. Despite its momentum, the movement was unable to achieve its goals. The activities of Elofre so alarmed the Spanish colonial government that Governor-General Valeriano Weyler sent 500 men of the Guardia Civil and a battleship to Negros to deal with the threat. On 22 August 1887, Elofre raided Siaton, the town adjoining Zamboanguita, and was killed in the encounter with colonial forces. His wife, Flaviana Tubigan, and relatives attempted to continue the movement, but they were eventually captured and exiled by Spanish authorities. They were succeeded by Ka Martin de la Cruz, of Tolong in southern Negros Oriental, Elofre's lieutenant. De la Cruz' command of the babaylanes degenerated into banditry. When the Spanish authorities failed in their bid to capture him, on 11 September 1893, de la Cruz was killed in a trap laid by his own mistress, Alfonsa Alaidan. The remaining Buhawi followers, were later recruited by Papa Isio when he began to organize his own group of babaylanes in another revolt against Spain.

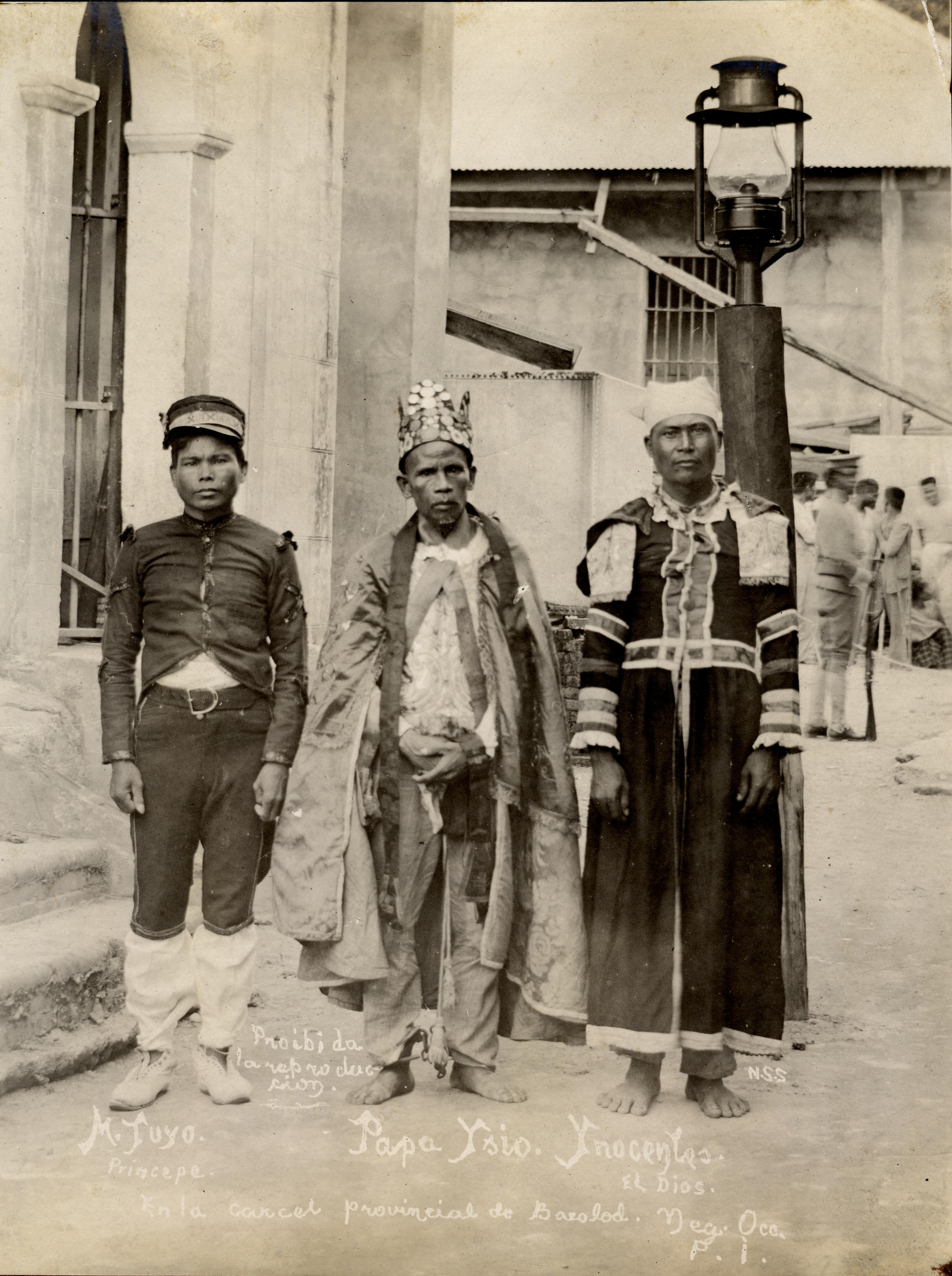
Papa Isio with two babaylanes followers in a prison in Bacolod after his surrender to American authorities in 1907. Note his "Papal vestments" and the woman's dress worn by the man to his left.

The last significant dios-dios rebellion in the 19th century was led by Dionisio Magbuelas, better known as Papa Isio, meaning "Pope Isio". Papa Isio was a son of migrants from Panay. By 1880 at 34 years old, he was involved in a scuffle with a Spaniard. Fearing reprisal from the colonial government, he fled to the mountains, where he met Dios Buhawi, leader of the Pulahanes. He joined the Dios Buhawi group. In 1896 Papa Isio organized his own babaylanes group from remnants of Buhawi's followers, in Himamaylan, Negros Occidental. During his leadership, the movement would become more organized and he led a new revolt beginning in Himamaylan. The movement would continue until the Philippine Revolution in August 1898. During this era, the movement rapidly gained adherents and began setting up base camp on the slopes of Mount Kanlaon. Soon, they began to have sympathy for the Katipunan, and entered a pact with Aniceto Lacson and Juan Araneta, leaders of the Katipunan-affiliated Negros Revolution. After the formation of the Republic of Negros in November 1898, tensions began to arise with their new allies. This led to a boiling point when the leaders of this republic signed a treaty with the United States. Papa Isio immediately withdrew his allegiance from this government and began his new offensive. After the Philippines was ceded to the United States after the Spanish–American War, Papa Isio was initially made "military chief" of La Castellana, Negros Occidental under the American government. However, he picked up armed resistance again in 1899 during the Philippine–American War. His movement ended on 6 August 1907, when Papa Isio surrendered to American authorities and was sentenced to death. This was later commuted to life imprisonment and he died in the Manila Bilibid Prison in 1911.

Another dios-dios uprising was led by a shaman named Gregorio Lampinio (better known as "Gregorio Dios", and also known as "Hilario Pablo" or "Papa") in Antique from 1888. The uprising was formed near Mount Balabago, a sacred pilgrimage site for shamans. Lampinio led a force of around 400 people. They collected contribuciones babaylanes (a revolutionary tax), disseminated anti-colonial ideas, and launched attacks on towns in Antique and Iloilo. The group was eventually suppressed by the Guardia Civil by 1890.

=== The Pulahan campaign ===
Concurrent with Papa Isio's rebellion in Negros Occidental against American rule, the dios-dios movement in eastern Visayas turned their attention to the new American colonial government. Calling themselves the Pulajanes ("those who wear red"). Like their predecessors, they claimed supernatural powers and used fetishistic amulets, holy oils, and magic spells in battle. They attacked both American troops and local Filipinos cooperating with the American colonial government. James Francis Smith, Governor-General of the Philippines, wrote about the Pulahanes in a 1906 report: "To many the word "pulahan" is synonymous with that of bandit or robber. This designation... is hardly proper. The pulahanes of Leyte and Samar can hardly be called robbers or thieves. Indeed, as a rule the pulahan is hard working, industrious, and not at all disposed to violence unless impelled to it by long continued wrongs or by the potent influence of religious fanaticism. All the trouble in Leyte and in Samar was due in a large degree to injustices perpetrated upon the people... Education and just treatment will make out of the pulahan a good citizen"

==== Leyte ====
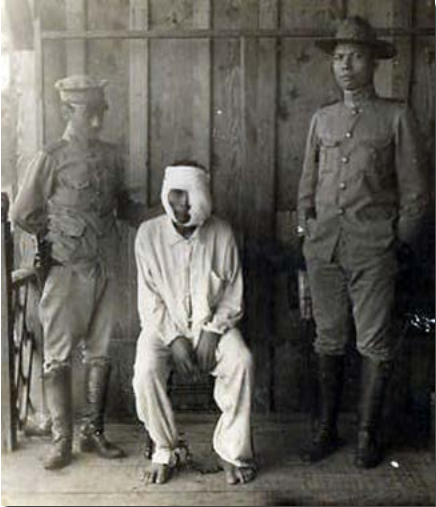
Pulahan leader Faustino Ablen after he was captured by the Philippine Constabulary at his mountain hideout in Dagami on 11 June 1907.

From 1902 to 1907 the Pulahanes challenged the American authorities in Leyte, led by Faustino Ablen ("Papa Faustino"), an illiterate peasant who assumed the title of pope. Ablen claimed to have supernatural powers and sold anting-anting that would render one invisible to the enemy and holy oil that could cure any ailment. Ablen promised his followers that after victory, he would lead them to a mountain top on which stood seven churches made of gold, and they would be re-united with dead relatives and lost carabaos. Ablen's troops attacked American forces and captured weapons where they could, however their primary weapon remained the bolo. They would also attack Filipino's who collaborated with the Americans. For example, during the raid on Carigara, they beheaded the local presidente, killed his wife and kidnapped his children. They did not harm innocent locals, their only purpose was to obtain weapons and wreak vengeance on the town police. Despite determined campaigns by the Constabulary, the revolt continued to grow. In some battles, the movement managed to deploy five hundred to one thousand men. The government was so alarmed that it offered a 2000 peso reward for Papa Faustino, dead or alive. US Major General Leonard Wood sent four battalions of the US Army to Leyte to crush the rebellion. This finally broke the rebellion into exceedingly smaller groups that were forced to deploy guerilla tactics. On May 25, 1907, Papa Faustino's wife and family were captured. On June 11, 1907, a detachment of Philippine Scouts chanced upon four Pulahan fighters and opened fire. Three men escaped, but one was captured. He was Papa Faustino. With his capture, the rebellion in Leyte came to an end.

==== Samar ====
After Emilio Aguinaldo's acceptance of U.S. sovereigny over the Philippines in April 1901, the resistance in Samar led by general Vicente Lukbán continued. After Lukban's secret headquarters along the Cadac-an River was taken over by the Americans on 17 November 1901, several rebel leaders refused to surrender and retreated to the interior of the island, including Lukban who had escaped. Among the rebel leaders were Pablo Bulan ("Papa Pablo"), Antonio Anugar, and Pedro de la Cruz. All of them were members of the Dios-Dios. After Lukban was captured on 18 February 1902, Papa Pablo became the leader of the resistance. From 1902 to 1904, Papa Pablo built up his forces in the mountains, which were estimated at 7,000 by 1903. After the Americans brought them the same corrupt officials, new taxes and laws, the local population began to join the Pulahanes and launch attacks on the government.

Colonel Enrique Villareal Dagohob (or Daguhob) was a college-educated native of Bicol, who served in the Siege of Catubig in April 1900. He was jailed in his native Masbate from 1902, under the name Andres Villasis (which according to the Philippine Commission was probably his real name), until 24 February 1903. On this day he escaped with five other accomplices. After escaping jail, he went to Leyte and became a prominent military leader, where he was known as Enrique Villareal. In the spring of 1904, he went to Samar under the new pseudonym Dagohob, which means "strong wind" or "thunder" in the Visayan language. He left Leyte for Samar because of the more favorable war conditions and the strained relations with other Pulahanes. After his arrival, Dagohob set up a base in Catubig in Eastern Samar. After being given a considerable amount of freedom by the Pulahan leaders, perhaps because of his superior education, Dagohob quickly took over the leadership of northeastern Samar and bolstered the Pulahan movement on the island. Dagohob planned to drive the local population into the mountainous interior of the island by the destruction of towns and villages, after which they would be influenced to join the resistance. The government responded by stationing troops and warning the local residents not to leave their settlements. As the Pulahanes had grown too strong for the Constabulary and Philippine Scouts to handle, the US Army relieved the Constabulary forces in December 1904. However, attacks continued and more weapons were captured. The Constabulary forces were then sent into the heart of Pulahan territory. One detachment established a fort at San Ramon, which the Pulahanes soon attacked. The following description of the assault was made:

The first assault party consisted of sixty bolomen, each of whom had two bolos lashed to their wrists. Others carried long poles with burning torches to burn the grass roofs and force its occupants into the open where they could be chopped down by the fanatical bolomen... the main attack unfolded with 700 red-and-white-uniformed pulajanes shouting "Tad! Tad!", as they stormed the fortress. The bolomen received supporting rifle fire from the nearby brush but it was not effective as the pulajanes were notoriously poor shots. All night the battle raged and gradually the pulajan bodies piled up outside the fort. Hundreds of pulajanes were wounded while 100 were killed outright before Anugar (the leader) called the assault broken off.

A devastating battle for the movement was the Battle of Dolores River on 12 December 1904, in Samar, when over 1,000 Pulahanes led by Pedro de la Cruz were massacred by the 38-man contingency of the United States-led Philippine Constabulary. The 38th was ambushed en route, by over 1,000 Pulahanes. As the Pulahanes rushed, waving colorful banners and shouting Tadtad! ("Chop up!" or "Cut to pieces!"; recorded in American sources as "Tad-Tad!") they were met with a volley of rifle-fire that stopped their advance. The Constables held their ground and repelled the attacks, inflicting heavy losses with accurate and steady rifle fire. The Pulahanes were far greater in number, however, and they eventually wiped out the entire scout force. Of the 43-man contingent, the officer and 37 of his men were killed. The Pulajans on the other hand, suffered much heavier losses. Estimates range as high as 300 dead before the Constabulary fell. The pulahan fighters were able to capture 38 Krags rifles, along with a large amount of ammunition.

After several captures of guns by the Pulahanes, their force grew stronger, both in firepower and in the boldness of the fighters. By February 1905 the Pulahanes dominated many areas of the island. The government had practically no control of Samar, which was limited to military posts. To make headway, eastern Samar was placed under complete control of the regular army, while the Constabulary retained control over the more peaceful western side. In a surprise attack in July 1905, American troops killed Dagohob, after which many of his followers surrendered and resistance in the area he controlled stopped. In August, Antonio Anugar was also killed. Early in 1906, Nazario Aguillar and 130 of his men agreed to surrender, however this was only a ruse, as during the surrender ceremony they suddenly attacked instead of giving up their arms. It was a suicidal attempt as 43 Pulahanes were killed, but they did kill 22 Constables. In November 1906, de la Cruz was killed in battle and a number of his officers were captured. A few days later, Constables attacked Papa Pablo's camp and killed him. Only one leader of importance remained, Isidro Pompac, also known as Otoy, who assumed control and the title of Papa. By this time, the Pulahanes were much weakened and Otoy roamed from place to place to evade capture. George Curry, Governor of Samar, wrote about the Pulahan in a 1907 report: "Pulahanism" has almost ceased to exist in this province (Samar). Otoy, assisted by Angeles and a few others, is in the mountains between Borongan and Basey with some fifty or sixty followers. They have been so closely pressed by the military, constabulary, and volunteers that they have not made an attack on any of the towns or force since November 1906. Since my last report, Papa Pablo, the religious head of the Pulahanes, Pedro de la Cruz, the fighting leader, Lucente Picardel, and several other leaders have been killed." Major J.B. Murphy was senior inspector and leader of the Samar Philippine Constabulary, tasked with capturing Pulahan leadership.

Curry appointed former Philippine Revolution Army Officers Congressman Eugenio Daza and Narciso Abuke to serve directly under Murphy as Captains. Daza oversaw East-Samar and Abuke West-Samar. As captains, they appointed subordinate officers and enlisted men. Many of the men Daza recruited served under him during the Philippine Revolution and Philippine-American War. Daza and Abuke led companies of 100 armed men each. Daza negotiated with, and arrested, Cipriano "Teducduc" Amango the leader of the Southeastern Samar Pulahan and leader of the Magtaon Attack. Teducduc was formerly a revolutionary under Daza during the Philippine-American War. In the barrio of Napta-an, Daza and his men encountered a major group of Pulahanes. Daza's victory here is credited as the victory that led to the eventual defeat of the Pulahan in Samar. Murphy is credited with killing the religious head, Papa Pablo. Abuke and his men are credited with killing their fighting leader, Pedro de la Cruz and 20 of his men. Four years later on 1 October 1911, a Constabulary force managed to locate Otoy's small band and killed them. This ended the Pulahan resistance. In Samar alone, 7,000 Pulahanes had died.

== See also ==
- Filipino shamans
- Battle of Balangiga
- Anito
