= Vicente Lukbán =

Filipino revolutionary leader

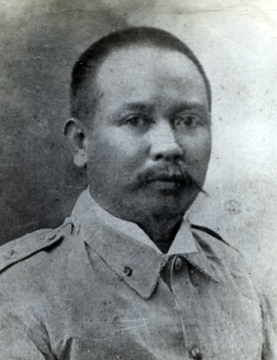
- Lukbán in c. 1901

8th Governor of Tayabas
- In office 1912 – November 16, 1916
- Preceded by: Primitivo San Agustin
- Succeeded by: Maximo Rodriguez

Personal details
- Born: Vicente Lukbán y Rilles; February 11, 1860 Labo, Ambos Camarines, Captaincy General of the Philippines
- Died: November 16, 1916 (aged 56) Manila, Philippine Islands
- Cause of death: Illness
- Resting place: San Isidro Labrador Parish Church, Pasay City
- Party: Nacionalista
- Spouse(s): Sofía Dízon Barba; Paciencia Gonzales
- Children: 12
- Education: Ateneo Municipal de Manila; University of Santo Tomas (LL.B); Colegio de San Juan de Letran (LL.B)
- Awards: Philippine Republic Medal
- Nickname(s): "Enteng" "El General de Samar"

Military service
- Allegiance: First Philippine Republic
- Branch/service: Philippine Republican Army
- Years of service: 1898–1902
- Rank: Captain General
- Battles/wars: Philippine–American War: Battle of Balangiga; Operations in Bicol military area; Operations in Leyte military area; Operations in Samar military area

Vicente Lukbán y Rilles or Vicente Lucbán Rilles (February 11, 1860 – November 16, 1916) was a Philippine general in the Philippine Republican Army and politician who served as the governor of Tayabas (now Quezon) from 1912 to 1916.

He was also an officer in Emilio Aguinaldo's staff during the Philippine Revolution and the politico-military chief of Samar and Leyte during the Philippine–American War. Some sources credit him as the strategist of the Battle of Balangiga, in which more than 50 American troopers were ambushed and killed.

== Early life ==
Lukbán was born in Labo, Ambos Camarines (now part of Camarines Norte), on February 11, 1860, to Agustin Lukbán of Ambos Camarines and Andrea Rilles of Lucban, Tayabas. He is the brother of Justo Lukbán. He completed his early education at Escuela Pia in Lucban, continued his studies at Ateneo Municipal de Manila, and took up Bachelor of Laws at the University of Santo Tomas and Colegio de San Juan de Letran.

In 1886, he resigned his position as a justice of the peace to form Coorporation Popular, an agricultural and commercial cooperative based in Bicol aimed at promoting the business activities of small and medium scale producers in order to increase their income from the lands by selling their products without passing through middle men. He married Sofía Dízon Barba and the union produced four children: Cecilia, Félix, Agustín, and Vicente Jr. Sofía died after their last child was born. Lukbán then left his children in the care of his siblings so that he could devote his time to the cause of the revolution.

== Philippine Revolution ==
Lukbán had been inducted into Freemasonry, Luz de Oriente ("Light of the Orient") in 1884. The organization had attracted many intellectuals and middle-class Filipinos to its ranks. Part of the profits of the cooperatives were secretly remitted to the revolutionary movement of Andrés Bonifacio, the Katipunan. The cooperative also served as an effective covert means of spreading the ideals of the revolution. Their members could move around freely without arousing the suspicion of the Spanish authorities.

By 1896, Lukbán had centralized the funds of the cooperatives into the coffers of the revolution. He periodically remitted money to the evolving revolutionary movement. At the same time, he acted as an emissary of the Katipunan unit in Bicol to gather information about the Spanish movements in Manila and to determine how such movements affected Bicol provinces. On one of his trips to Manila, he was arrested by the guardia civiles, ("civil guards") and charged with conspiring to overthrow the government, imprisoned in Bilibid prison, and tortured at Fort Santiago. He was released from prison on August 18, 1897.

The Philippine Revolution had begun while he was in prison. He was commissioned as one of Aguinaldo's officers and was among the few who assisted Aguinaldo in planning war strategies and activities. When the Pact of Biak-na-Bato was signed, he was asked by Aguinaldo to be one of the members of his party going into exile with the Hong Kong Junta, In Hong Kong, he studied military science under the British Naval command. This enabled him to master the arts of soldiery–fencing, shooting, gunpowder and ammunition preparations, and the planning and execution of war strategies and tactics.

Shortly after Aguinaldo proclaimed Philippine independence in 1898, Lukbán was sent to the Bicol region to direct military operations against the Spaniards. His successes in Bicol ushered him into a new and challenging assignment: as Leyte and Samar's politico-military chief. Lukbán married his second wife Paciencia Gonzales in Samar. This union produced eight children: Victoria, Juan, María, Fidel, Rosita, Ramon, José, and Lourdes.

== Philippine-American War ==
On December 31, 1899, a hundred Philippine soldiers under Lukbán gathered and he proclaimed himself the new governor of Samar under the First Philippine Republic. When the US 1st Infantry Regiment landed on Samar's shores in January 1901, they were met by infantry charges under Lukbán's command. Nevertheless, Lukban was soon forced to retreat into the island's interior, leaving behind an organized resistance network. Samareños caught cooperating with the Americans were executed swiftly and dramatically. When US Major General Arthur MacArthur Jr. offered Lukban amnesty in exchange for his surrender, he turned it down and swore to fight to the end.

Aguinaldo, then president of the First Philippine Republic, was captured in March 1901. On April 19, he issued a manifesto to the Philippine people "acknowledging and accepting United States sovereignty throughout the entire Archipelaago without any reservation whatsoever". Samar, under Lukbán's leadership, remained one of the few areas of resistance. American troops encountered few enemies to fight in the open, but were constantly harassed by Lukban's forces. Some sources credit Lukban as the strategist behind the September 1901 Balangiga massacre, in which more than 50 American troopers were ambushed and killed. Other sources, surmise that, although Lukbán may not have played an actual part in the planning of the attack, he approved the operation which was planned by his Chief of Staff Captain Eugenio Daza.

After two prisoners of war revealed the location of Lukbán's headquarters along the Cadac-an River, Basey, Samar, warning that the fort was impregnable, Major Littleton Waller sent scouts to investigate. On November 17, 1901, Waller attacked with an amphibious assault team up the river, as Captains Hiram Bearss and David Porter attacked by land with forces from Basey and Balangiga. (Note: Captains Bearss and Porter both received Medal of Honor citations for extraordinary heroism in that action. Both later advanced to general officer rank, as did Major Waller.) The amphibious assault was thwarted by a carefully laid out ambush by Lukban's forces, and Porter attacked alone. Lukban's defenders retreated when they started to receive heavy machine gun fire from American Gatling guns, leaving scaling ladders behind for the Americans. It was a victory for the Americans, with 30 defending soldiers dead. The war on Samar, however, would not truly be over until the rugged interior, controlled by the Pulahanes was conquered.

Lukbán was captured on 18 February 1902 in Catubig, northern Samar.

== Post-captivity ==
Lukbán's career did not end with his captivity. He was elected governor of Tayabas (now Quezon) in 1912 and re-elected in 1916. He died at his Manila residence on November 16, 1916.

== Memorials ==
- Camp Lukban, military base of the Philippine Army's 8th Infantry Division (8ID) in Maulong, Catbalogan, Samar, is named after him.
- A street in Gagalangin, Tondo in Manila is named after him.
- A species of Philippine lizard, Brachymeles lukbani, is named after him.
- A monument in honor of him was built inside the Philippine National Police Samar Provincial Office.
