= Philippine–American War =

Armed Philippine-American conflict (1899–1902)

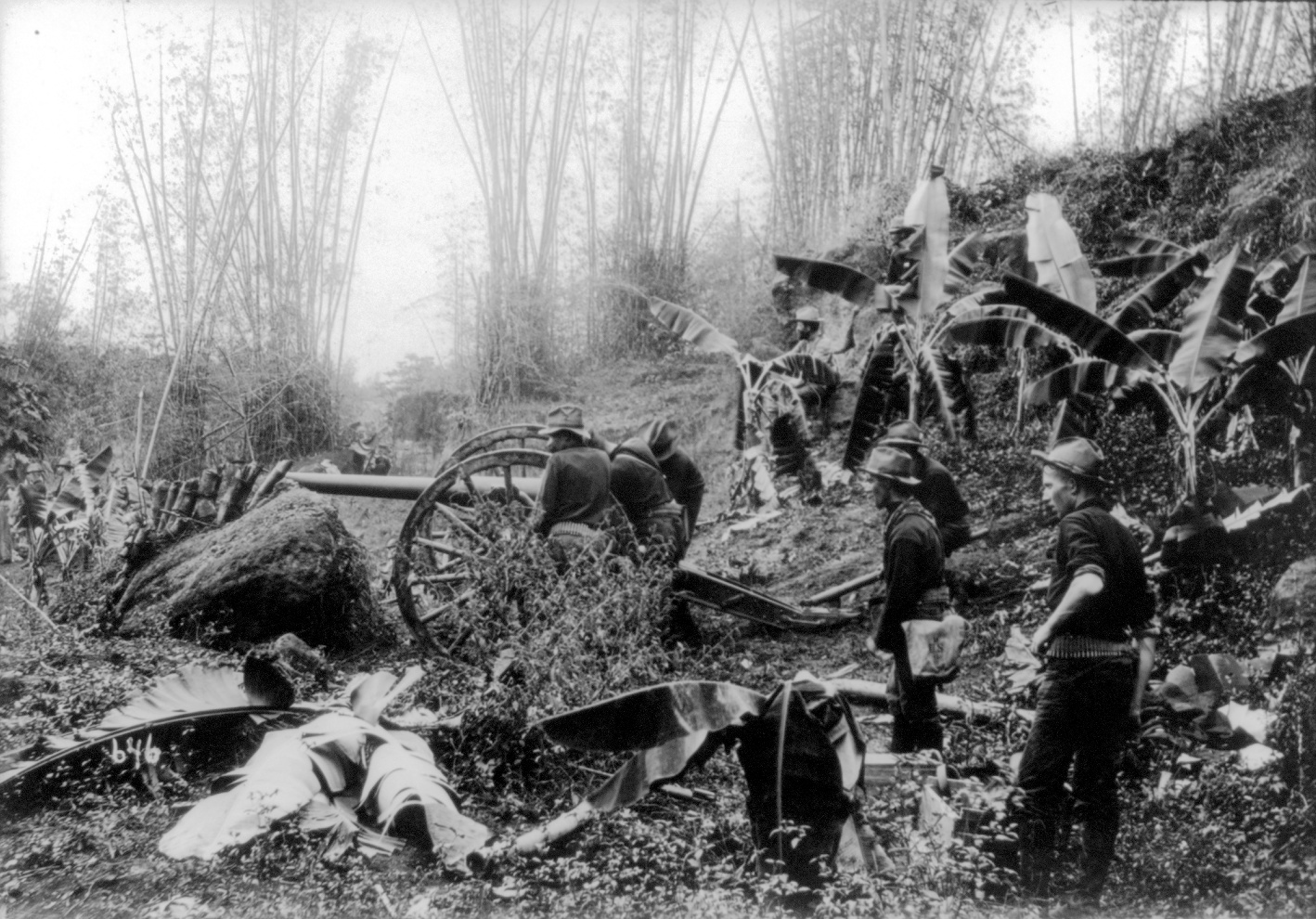
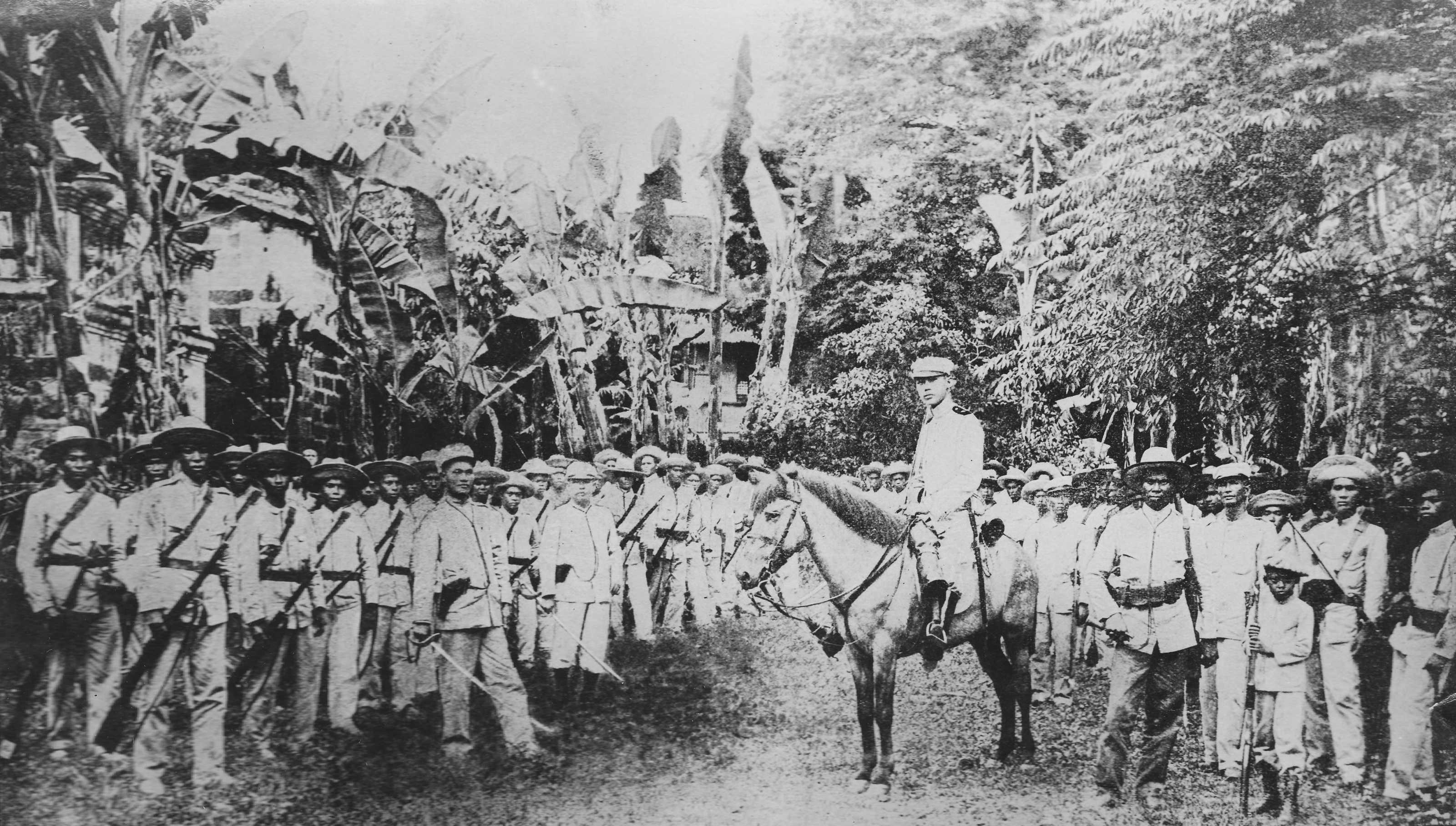
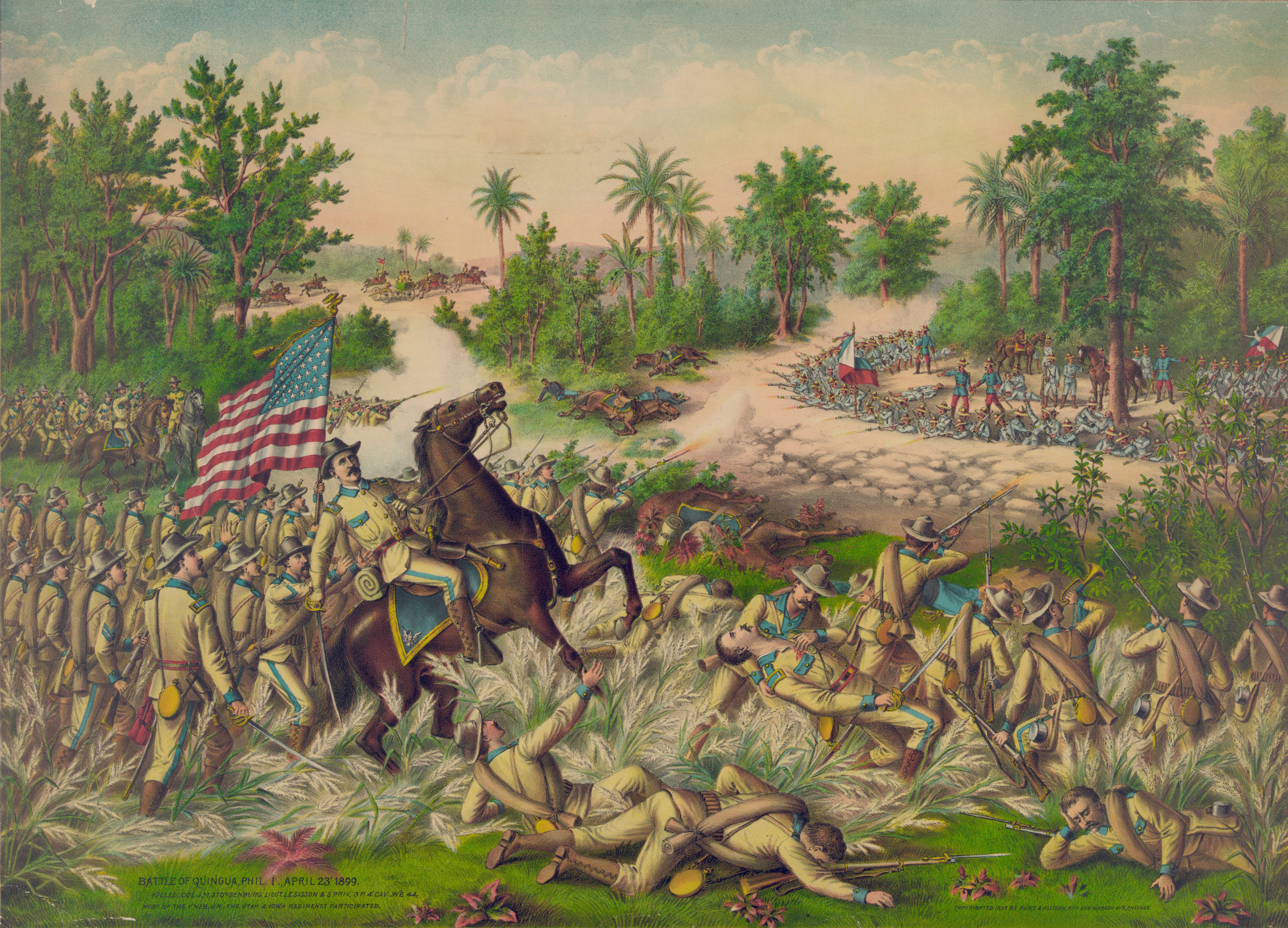
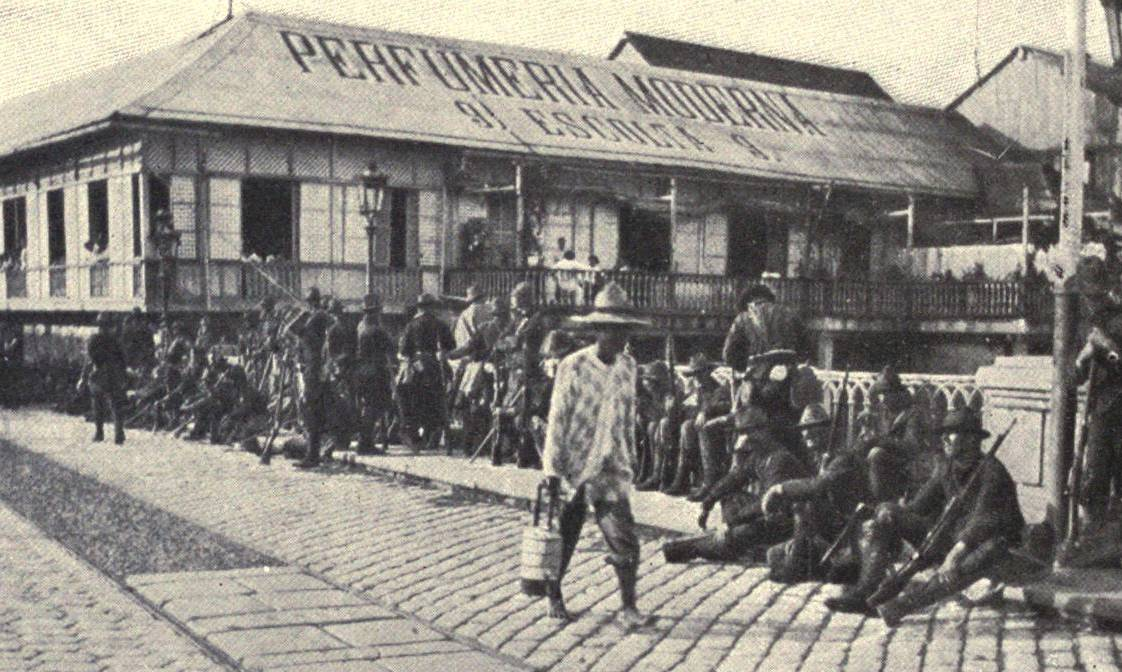
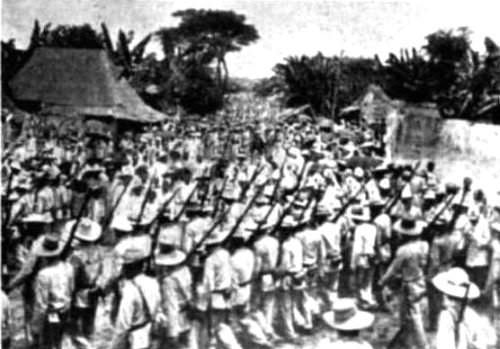
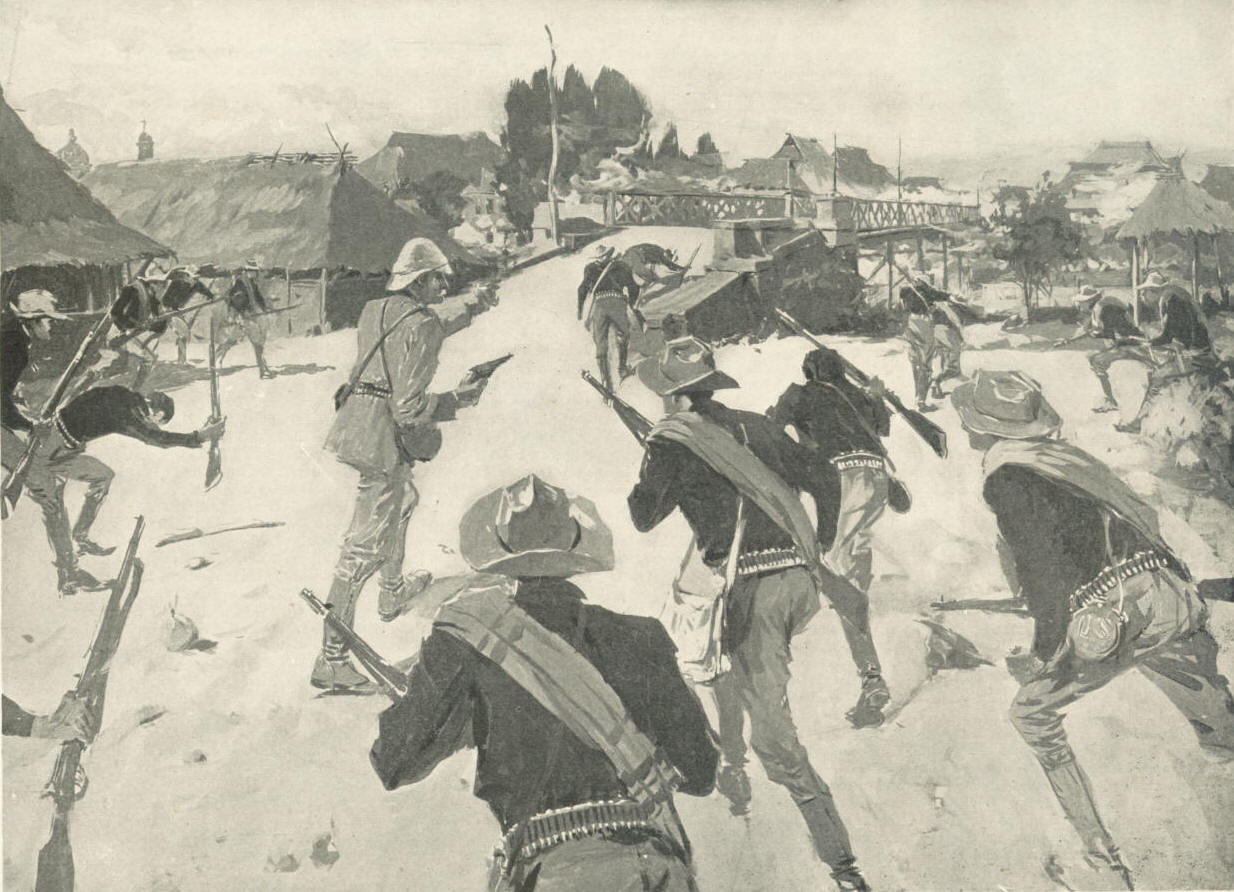
- Clockwise from top left: U.S. troops in Manila, Gregorio del Pilar and his troops around 1898, Americans guarding the Pasig River bridge in 1898, the Battle of Santa Cruz, Filipino soldiers at Malolos, the Battle of Quingua
Date	First phase: February 4, 1899 – July 4, 1902 (3 years, 2 months, 1 week and 5 days) (Note: There is disagreement regarding the official ending date of the conflict; see here for further information.); Moro Rebellion: May 2, 1902 – June 15, 1913 (11 years, 1 month, 1 week and 6 days)
Location	Philippines, Philippine Islands, First Philippine Republic
Result	American victory: Dissolution of the First Philippine Republic
Territorial changes	Establishment of complete U.S. control over the Philippine Islands

Belligerents
1899–1902: United States: Military Government of the Philippine Islands	1899–1902: (Note: The Philippine Republic was de jure dissolved in 1901 when Emilio Aguinaldo surrendered himself to the Americans and announce the Philippine people to lay down their weapons. However, his unofficial successor Miguel Malvar continued the fight without formal recognition of the people until his surrender in 1902.); Philippines: Negros Republic; Zamboanga Republic; Supplied by: Germany; Japan
1902–1913: United States: Insular Government of the Philippine Islands	1902–1913: Tagalog Republic (until 1906); Maguindanao Sultanate (until 1905); Sulu Sultanate

Commanders and leaders
William McKinley X; Theodore Roosevelt; Jacob G. Schurman; William Howard Taft; Arthur MacArthur Jr.; Elwell Stephen Otis; Adna Chaffee; Henry Lawton †; Frederick N. Funston; J. Franklin Bell; George W. Davis; Leonard Wood; Tasker H. Bliss; John J. Pershing	Emilio Aguinaldo (surrendered); Apolinario Mabini; Pedro Paterno; Antonio Luna X; Artemio Ricarte; José Alejandrino; Miguel Malvar (surrendered); Gregorio Aglipay; Dionisio Seguela; Manuel Tinio; Gregorio del Pilar †; Vicente Alvarez; Macario Sakay (executed); Datu Ali †; Jamalul Kiram II

Units involved
1899–1902: U.S. Army; U.S. Volunteers; U.S. Marine Corps; U.S. Navy; Macabebe Scouts; 1902–1913: U.S. Marine Corps; Philippine Scouts; Philippine Constabulary	1899–1902: Philippine Army; Philippine Navy; Babaylanes; Pulajanes; (Empire of Japan) Ishin Shishi; 1902–1913; Irreconcilables; Babaylanes; Pulajanes; Moro people

Strength
c. 126,000 total; 24,000–44,000 field strength	80,000–100,000 regular and irregular forces

Casualties and losses
7,126 Total casualties 1,020 killed 3,176 died of disease 2,930 wounded	About 10,000 killed (Emilio Aguinaldo estimate) 16,000–20,000 killed (American estimate)
- 200,000–250,000 civilian deaths (Note: While there are many estimates of civilian deaths, with some at around 1 million and others going well over a million for the war, modern historians generally place the death toll between 200,000 and 250,000, most because of famine and disease; see "Casualties".)

The Philippine–American War, known alternatively as the Philippine Insurrection, Filipino–American War, (Note: Spanish: Guerra filipino-estadounidense; Tagalog: Digmaang Pilipino–Amerikano) or Tagalog Insurgency, was a conflict from 1898 to 1902 between the United States and the Philippine Republic after the Spanish–American War. The United States ultimately prevailed, and maintained control of the Philippines until independence in 1946, other than a period of Japanese occupation between 1941 and 1945.

In 1898, the United States annexed the Philippines from Spain after the Spanish American War, under the terms of the December 1898 Treaty of Paris. The Spanish Empire had controlled the Philippine Islands since 1565 as the Captaincy General of the Philippines. After the defeat of the Spanish Empire, Filipino nationalists had proclaimed independence in June 1898 and constituted the First Philippine Republic in January 1899. The United States did not recognize either event as legitimate, and tensions escalated until fighting commenced on February 4, 1899, in the Battle of Manila.

Shortly after being denied a request for an armistice, the Philippine government issued a proclamation on June 2, 1899, urging the people to continue the war. Philippine forces initially attempted to engage U.S. forces conventionally but transitioned to guerrilla tactics by November 1899. Philippine president Emilio Aguinaldo was captured on March 23, 1901, and the war was officially declared over by the US on July 4, 1902. However, some Philippine groups continued to fight for several more years. Other groups, such as the Muslim Moro peoples of the southern Philippines and folk Catholic Pulahan religious movements, continued hostilities in remote areas. The quasi-Catholic Pulahan Movement disbanded in 1907 due to both Philippine and U.S. military pressure, and the Moro Rebellion ended with their final defeat at the Battle of Bud Bagsak on June 15, 1913.

The war resulted in up to 250,000 Filipino civilian deaths, mostly from famine and diseases, including at least 150,000 deaths in a cholera epidemic towards the end of the war. War crimes were committed during the conflict by both sides. The U.S. carried out reprisals and scorched earth campaigns and forcibly relocated many Filipino civilians to concentration camps, where thousands of them died. The war and subsequent occupation by the U.S. changed the culture of the islands, leading to the rise of Protestantism, disestablishment of the Catholic Church, and the adoption of English by the islands as the primary language of government, education, business, and industry. The U.S. annexation and war sparked a political backlash from anti-imperialists in the U.S. Senate, who argued the war was a definite example of U.S. imperialism, and was also an inherent contradiction of the founding principles of the United States contained in the Declaration of Independence.

In 1902, the United States Congress passed the Philippine Organic Act, which created the Philippine Assembly. This act was superseded by the 1916 Jones Act (Philippine Autonomy Act), which contained the first official declaration of the United States government's commitment to eventually grant independence to the Philippines. The 1934 Tydings–McDuffie Act created the Commonwealth of the Philippines, increased self-governance and established a process towards full independence. This would however be delayed by World War II and the Japanese occupation of the Philippines. The United States eventually withdrew and granted independence in 1946 through the Treaty of Manila.

== Background ==
=== Philippine Revolution ===
Andrés Bonifacio was a warehouseman and clerk from Manila. On July 7, 1892, he established the Katipunan, a revolutionary organization formed to gain independence from Spanish colonial rule by armed revolt. In August 1896, the Katipunan was discovered by the Spanish authorities and thus launched its revolution. Fighters in Cavite province won early victories. One of the most influential and popular leaders from Cavite was Emilio Aguinaldo, mayor of Cavite El Viejo (modern-day Kawit), who gained control of much of the eastern portion of Cavite province. Eventually, Aguinaldo and his faction gained control of the revolution. After Aguinaldo was elected president of a revolutionary government superseding the Katipunan at the Tejeros Convention on March 22, 1897, his government had Bonifacio executed for treason after a show trial on May 10, 1897.

=== Aguinaldo's exile and return ===
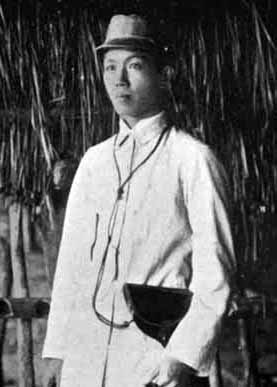
Emilio Aguinaldo in the field

By late 1897, after a succession of defeats for the revolutionary forces, the Spanish had regained control over most of rebel territory. Aguinaldo and Spanish Governor-General Fernando Primo de Rivera entered into armistice negotiations while Spanish forces surrounded Aguinaldo's hideout and base in Biak-na-Bato in Bulacan province. On December 14, 1897, an agreement was reached in which the Spanish colonial government would pay Aguinaldo $MXN800,000 (Note: The Mexican dollar at the time was worth about 50 US cents, equivalent to about $19.35 today. The peso fuerte and the Mexican dollar were interchangeable at par.) in three installments if Aguinaldo went into exile outside the Philippines.

Aguinaldo and 25 of his closest associates left their headquarters at Biak-na-Bato and made their way to Hong Kong, in accord with the agreement. Before his departure, Aguinaldo publicly denounced the revolution and exhorted rebel combatants to disarm, and declared those who continued hostilities to be bandits. In private, however, Aguinaldo had planned to use the truce money to fund a re-initiation of the revolution, and some revolutionaries continued armed resistance against the Spanish colonial government.

On April 22, 1898, the exiled Aguinaldo privately met in Singapore with United States Consul E. Spencer Pratt. Pratt was later severely rebuked for having met with Aguinaldo and told, "Your action was unauthorized and can not be approved", but the meeting convinced Aguinaldo to return to the Philippines and reclaim leadership of the revolution. Aguinaldo and Pratt each offered contradictory accounts of the meeting.

Aguinaldo returned to Hong Kong and was transported by the Americans to Cavite, arriving on May 19, marking the resumption of the Revolution and commencing a succession of victories that prompted him to order the Philippine Declaration of Independence. The revolution was governed by a Dictatorial Government, but about a month later, this temporary dictatorship was replaced with a Revolutionary Government that appointed Aguinaldo as president. Less than three months after his return, the Philippine Revolutionary Army liberated and established civil government over nearly all the Philippines Islands with the exception of Manila, which was surrounded by revolutionary forces some 12,000 strong.

=== Conflicting powers in the Philippines ===
Towards the end of 1898, the partially elected and partially appointed Malolos Congress, established by the organic statute of the Revolutionary Government, drafted a constitution whose promulgation led to the formal establishment of the Philippine Republic by late January 1899. This state would retroactively be known as the First Philippine Republic, and also the Malolos Republic after its capital. Aguinaldo, who had been elected president in accordance with the constitution, officially considered by the Philippine government as the first President of the Philippines.

The Philippine Declaration of Independence was not recognized by either the United States or Spain. In fact, throughout its duration the war was referred to by the United States as the Philippine Insurrection, highlighting a lack of recognition of war between independent nations and instead labeling it as a rebel uprising.In spite of the losses to revolutionary forces, Spain presumed sovereignty over the Philippines and ceded the Philippines to the United States in consideration for an indemnity for Spanish expenses and assets lost via the 1898 Treaty of Paris, signed on December 10, 1898, which concluded the Spanish–American War. The Revolutionary Government sought representation but any Philippine representation was excluded from the talks.

== Origins of the conflict ==
=== Mock Battle of Manila ===
In July 1898, three months into the Spanish–American War, U.S. command began suspecting Aguinaldo was secretly negotiating with Spanish authorities to gain control of Manila without U.S. assistance, reporting that the rebel leader was restricting delivery of supplies to U.S. forces. General Thomas M. Anderson assessed that a rebel controlled Manila would be able to resist any U.S. attempt to establish a provisional government. General Wesley Merritt disregarded Aguinaldo's warning not to disembark American troops in places liberated by Filipinos without first informing him in writing about the places and purposes of the actions. U.S. commanders came to suspect that Philippine rebel forces were informing Spanish forces of U.S. troop movements.

U.S. and Spanish commanders negotiated a secret agreement to stage a mock battle in Manila, after which Spanish forces would surrender to U.S. forces. Philippine forces would not be allowed to enter the city. Fighting between U.S. and Philippine troops almost broke out as the former moved to dislodge the latter from strategic positions around Manila. On the eve of the staged battle, Anderson telegraphed Aguinaldo, "Do not let your troops enter Manila without the permission of the American commander. On this side of the Pasig River you will be under fire." On August 13, U.S. forces captured Manila. Relations between the U.S. and Philippine rebels continued to deteriorate.

=== End of the Spanish–American War ===
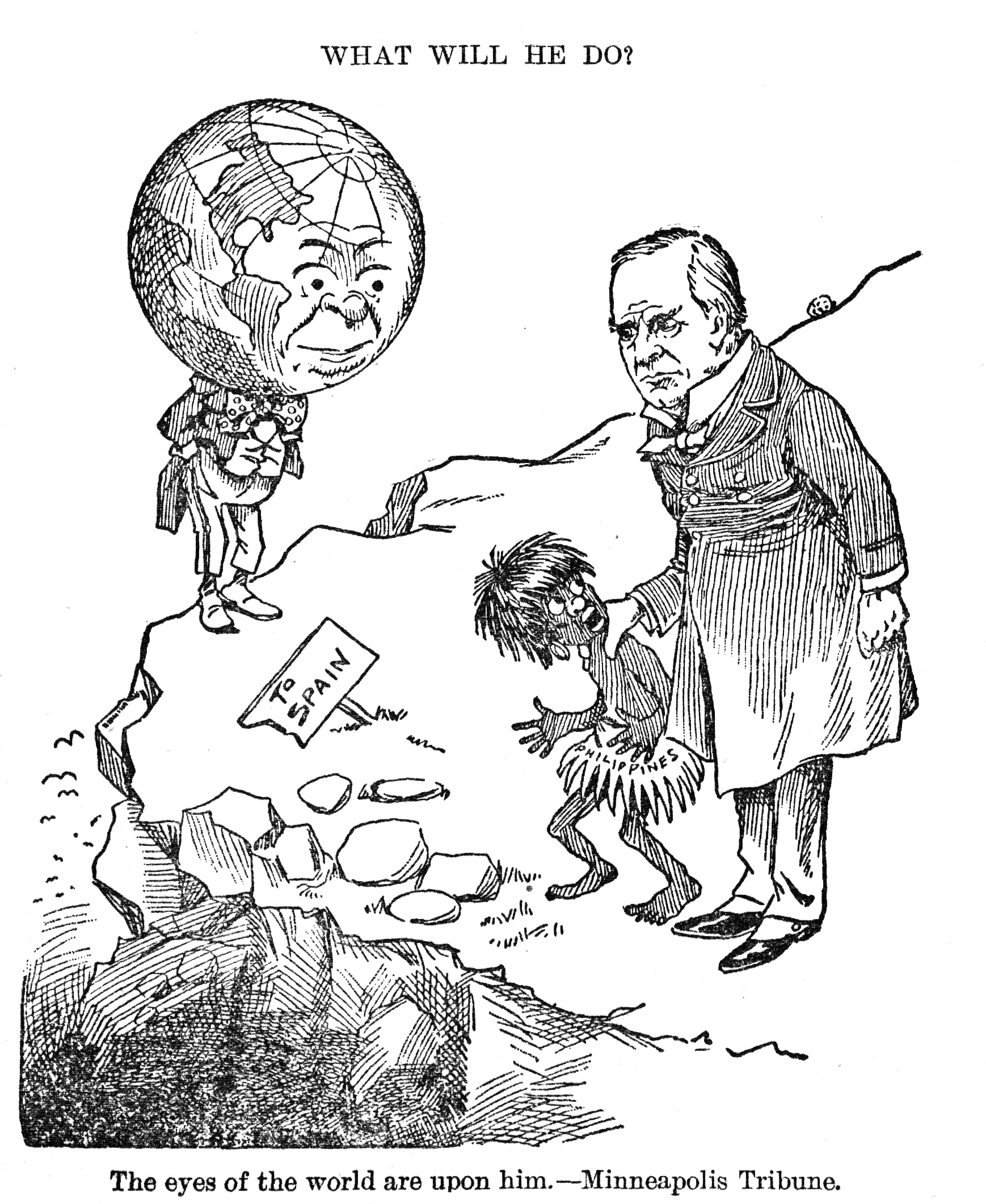
1898 US political cartoon. U.S. President William McKinley is shown holding the Philippines, depicted as a native child, as the world looks on. The implied options for McKinley are to keep the Philippines, or give it back to Spain, which the cartoon compares to throwing a child off a cliff.

On August 12, 1898, The New York Times reported that a peace protocol had been signed in Washington that afternoon between the U.S. and Spain, suspending hostilities. The full text of the protocol was not made public until November 5, but Article III read: "The United States will occupy and hold the City, Bay, and Harbor of Manila, pending the conclusion of a treaty of peace, which shall determine the control, disposition, and government of the Philippines." After conclusion of this agreement, U.S. President William McKinley proclaimed a suspension of hostilities with Spain.

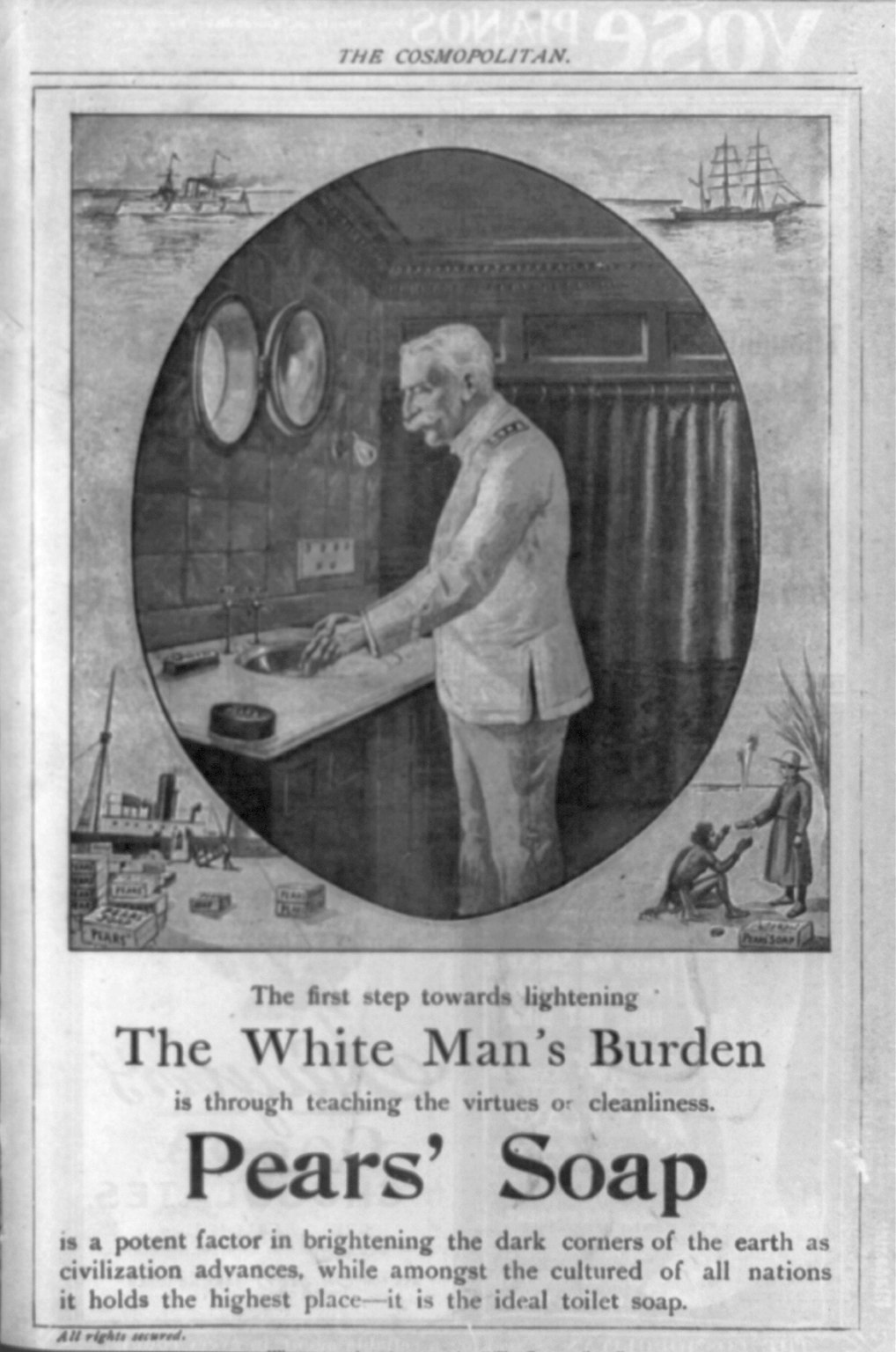
An advertisement for soap that depicts a U.S. admiral (in the likeness of George Dewey) taking on the ideology of "the white man's burden" in order to teach the "virtues of cleanliness". Highlighting that the United States deemed the Philippines as an "uncivilized" society that needs their paternal guidance, thus justifying the occupation.

In a clash at Cavite between US soldiers and insurgents on August 25, 1898, George Hudson of the Utah regiment was killed, Corporal William Anderson was mortally wounded, and four troopers of the Fourth Cavalry were slightly wounded. This provoked General Anderson to send Aguinaldo a letter saying, "In order to avoid the very serious misfortune of an encounter between our troops, I demand your immediate withdrawal with your guard from Cavite. One of my men has been killed and three wounded by your people. This is positive and does not admit of explanation or delay." Philippine communications reported that the Americans were drunk at the time. Aguinaldo expressed his regret and promised to punish the offenders. Apolinario Mabini initially proposed to investigate and punish any offenders identified. Aguinaldo modified this, ordering, "... say that he was not killed by your soldiers, but by them themselves [the Americans] since they were drunk according to your telegram". A Philippine officer in Cavite at the time reported on his record of services that he: "took part in the movement against the Americans on the afternoon of the 24th of August, under the orders of the commander of the troops and the adjutant of the post".

Elections were held by the Revolutionary Government between June and September 10, seating a legislature known as the Malolos Congress. In a session between September 15 and November 13, 1898, the Malolos Constitution was adopted. It was promulgated on January 21, 1899, creating the First Philippine Republic with Emilio Aguinaldo as president.

Article V of the peace protocol signed on August 12 had mandated negotiations to conclude a treaty of peace to begin in Paris not later than October 1, 1898. President McKinley sent a five-man commission, initially instructed to demand no more than Luzon, Guam, and Puerto Rico; which would have provided a limited U.S. empire. In Paris, the commission was besieged with advice, particularly from American generals and European diplomats, to demand the entire Philippine archipelago. The unanimous recommendation was that "it would certainly be cheaper and more humane to take the entire Philippines than to keep only part of it." McKinley claimed that returning the Philippines to Spain would have been "cowardly and dishonorable," that turning them over to "commercial rivals" of the United States would have been "bad business and discreditable," and that the Filipinos "were unfit for self-government."

On October 28, 1898, McKinley wired the commission that "cessation of Luzon alone, leaving the rest of the islands subject to Spanish rule, or to be the subject of future contention, cannot be justified on political, commercial, or humanitarian grounds. The cessation must be the whole archipelago or none. The latter is wholly inadmissible, and the former must therefore be required." The Spanish negotiators were furious over the "immodist demands of a conqueror", but their wounded pride was assuaged by an offer of twenty million dollars for "Spanish improvements" to the islands.

All the while, the Philippine government had sought representation in the talks through accredited diplomat Felipe Agoncillo, who had made efforts to ensure the inclusion of the new Philippine power. Agoncillo and his government were shut out completely from the negotiations.

The Spaniards capitulated to the Americans' demands, and on December 10, 1898, the U.S. and Spain signed the Treaty of Paris, formally ending the Spanish–American War. In Article III, Spain ceded the Philippine archipelago to the United States, as follows: "Spain cedes to the United States the archipelago known as the Philippine Islands, and comprehending the islands lying within the following line: [... geographic description elided ...]. The United States will pay to Spain the sum of twenty million dollars ($20,000,000) within three months after the exchange of the ratifications of the present treaty."

A movement to recognize Philippine independence surged in the U.S.; some said that the U.S. had no right to a land where many of the people wanted self-government. In 1898, industrialist Andrew Carnegie offered to pay the U.S. government $20 million to give the Philippines its independence.

=== Benevolent assimilation ===
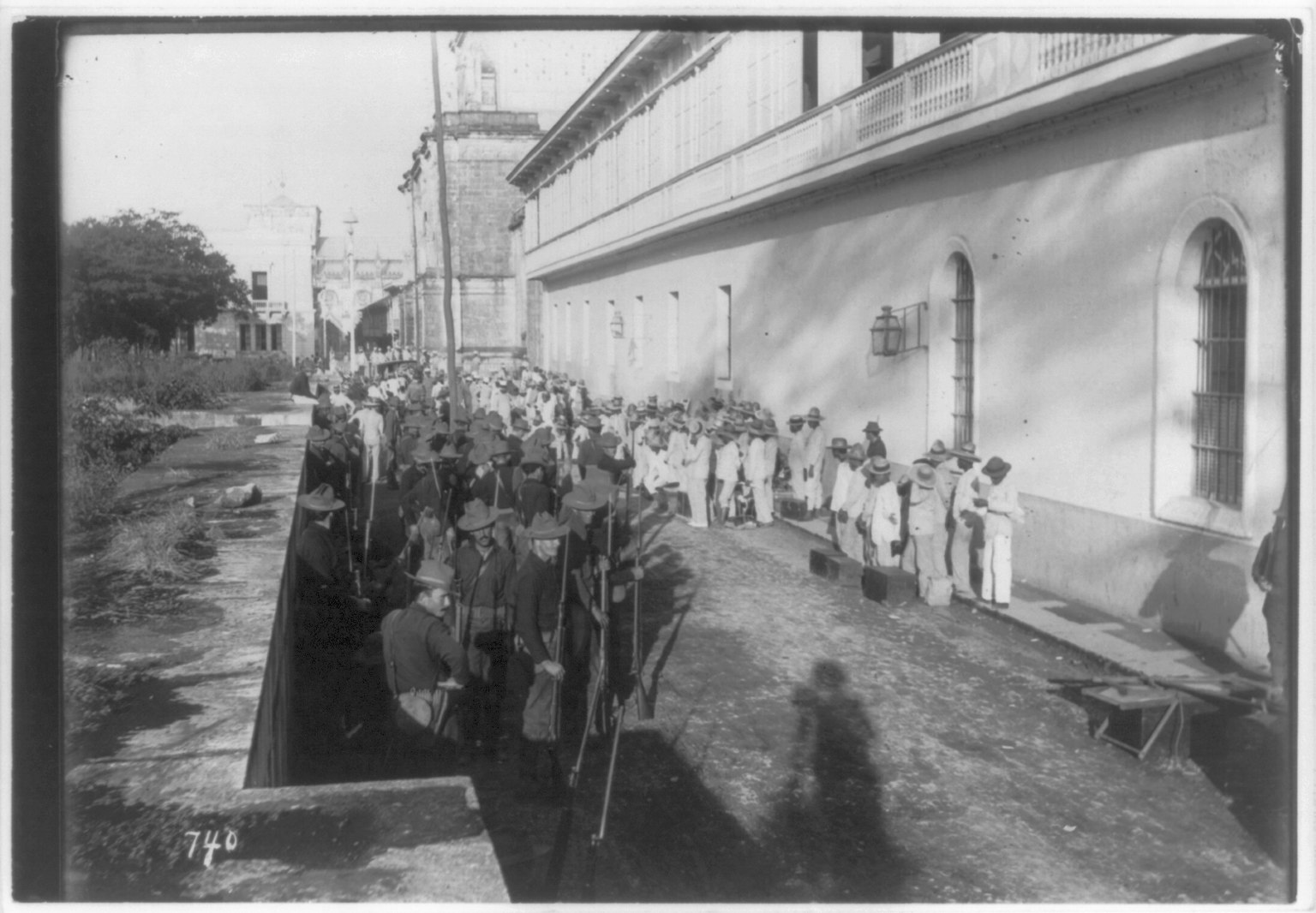
U.S. soldiers and insurrecto prisoners, Manila, 1899

On December 21, 1898, McKinley issued a proclamation of "benevolent assimilation, substituting the mild sway of justice and right for arbitrary rule" for "the greatest good of the governed". Referring to the Treaty of Paris, asserting that "as a result of the victories of American arms, the future control, disposition, and government of the Philippine Islands are ceded to the United States." It enjoined military commander Major General Elwell Stephen Otis to inform Filipinos that "in succeeding to the sovereignty of Spain" the authority of the United States "is to be exerted for the securing of the persons and property of the people of the islands and for the confirmation of all their private rights and relations". The proclamation specified that "it will be the duty of the commander of the forces of occupation to announce and proclaim in the most public manner that we come, not as invaders or conquerors, but as friends, to protect the natives in their homes, in their employments, and in their personal and religious rights".

The Spaniards yielded Iloilo to the revolutionaries on December 26. An American brigade under General Marcus P. Miller arrived on December 28 and opened communications with the Filipinos. President Lopez of the Federal Government of the Visayas told him that landing required "express orders from the central government of Luzon" and refused permission to land. That news reached Washington on January 1, 1899.

Otis, who had been appointed Military Governor of the Philippines, had delayed publication of McKinley's proclamation. On January 4, Otis published an amended version edited so as not to convey the meanings of the terms sovereignty, protection, and right of cessation, which were present in the original version. On January 6, 1899, General Otis was quoted in The New York Times as stating "convinced that the U.S. government intends to seek the establishment of a liberal government, in which the people will be as fully represented as the maintenance of law and order will permit, susceptible of development, on lines of increased representation, and the bestowal of increased powers, into a government as free and independent as is enjoyed by the most favored provinces in the world."

Unknown to Otis, the War Department had sent an enciphered copy of the Benevolent Assimilation proclamation to General Miller for informational purposes. Miller assumed that it was for distribution and, unaware that a politically bowdlerized version had been published by Otis, published the original in both Spanish and Tagalog translations which eventually made their way to Aguinaldo. Even before Aguinaldo received the unaltered version and observed the changes in the copy he had received from Otis, he was upset that Otis had altered his own title to "Military Governor of the Philippines" from "... in the Philippines", a change that Otis had made without authorization.

The original proclamation was given by supporters to Aguinaldo who, on January 5, issued a counter-proclamation:

Such procedures, so foreign to the dictates of culture and the usages observed by civilized nations, gave me the right to act without observing the usual rules of intercourse. Nevertheless, in order to be correct to the end, I sent to General Otis commissioners charged to solicit him to desist from his rash enterprise, but they were not listened to. My government can not remain indifferent in view of such a violent and aggressive seizure of a portion of its territory by a nation which arrogated to itself the title champion of oppressed nations. Thus it is that my government is disposed to open hostilities if the American troops attempt to take forcible possession of the Visayan Islands. I denounce these acts before the world, in order that the conscience of mankind may pronounce its infallable verdict as to who are the true oppressors of nations and the tormentors of human kind.

After some copies of that proclamation had been distributed, Aguinaldo ordered the recall of undistributed copies and issued another proclamation, which was published the same day in El Heraldo de la Revolucion, the official newspaper of the Philippine government. His statement in part said:

As in General Otis's proclamation he alluded to some instructions edited by His Excellency the President of the United States, referring to the administration of the matters in the Philippine Islands, I in the name of God, the root and fountain of all justice, and that of all the right which has been visibly granted to me to direct my dear brothers in the difficult work of our regeneration, protest most solemnly against this intrusion of the United States Government on the sovereignty of these islands. I equally protest in the name of the Filipino people against the said intrusion, because as they have granted their vote of confidence appointing me president of the nation, although I don't consider that I deserve such, therefore I consider it my duty to defend to death its liberty and independence.

Otis, taking these two proclamations as tantamount to war, strengthened American observation posts and alerted his troops. Aguinaldo's proclamations energized the masses with a vigorous determination to fight what was perceived as an ally turned enemy. Some 40,000 Filipinos fled Manila within a period of 15 days.

Meanwhile, Felipe Agoncillo had traveled to Washington. On January 6, he filed a request for an interview with the President to discuss affairs in the Philippines. The next day the government officials were surprised to learn that messages to General Otis to deal mildly with the rebels and not to force a conflict had become known to Agoncillo, and cabled by him to Aguinaldo.

On January 8, Agoncillo stated:

In my opinion the Filipino people, whom I represent, will never consent to become a colony dependency of the United States. The soldiers of the Filipino army have pledged their lives that they will not lay down their arms until General Aguinaldo tells them to do so, and they will keep that pledge, I feel confident.

The Filipino committees in London, Paris, and Madrid about this time telegraphed to President McKinley:

We protest against the disembarkation of American troops at Iloilo. The treaty of peace still unratified, the American claim to sovereignty is premature. Pray reconsider the resolution regarding Iloilo. Filipinos wish for the friendship of America and abhor militarism and deceit.

On January 8, Aguinaldo received the following message from Teodoro Sandiko:

To the President of the Revolutionary Government, Malolos, from Sandico, Manila. 8 Jan., 1899, 9:40 p.m.: In consequence of the order of General Rios to his officers, as soon as the Filipino attack begins the Americans should be driven into the Intramuros district and the walled city should be set on fire. Pipi.

The New York Times reported on January 8, that two Americans who had been guarding a waterboat in Iloilo had been attacked, one fatally, and that Filipinos were threatening to destroy the business section of the city by fire; and on January 10 that a peaceful solution to the Iloilo issues may result but that Aguinaldo had issued a proclamation threatening to drive the Americans from the islands.

By January 10, the Filipinos were ready for conflict but would not act unless the Americans fired the first shot. The pensive attitude toward the Americans caused them to push their lines further. Their attitude was well illustrated by this extract from a telegram sent by Colonel Cailles to Aguinaldo on January 10, 1899: "Most urgent. An American interpreter has come to tell me to withdraw our forces in Maytubig fifty paces. I shall not draw back a step, and in place of withdrawing, I shall advance a little farther. He brings a letter from his general, in which he speaks to me as a friend. I said that from the day I knew that Maquinley (McKinley) opposed our independence I did not want any dealings with any American. War, war, is what we want. The Americans after this speech went off pale."

The pensiveness had reached the presidency of the revolutionary government, as demonstrated by Aguinaldo's handwritten reply to Cailles: "I approve and applaud what you have done with the Americans, and zeal and valour always, also my beloved officers and soldiers there. I believe that they are playing us until the arrival of their reinforcements, but I shall send an ultimatum and remain always on the alert.--E. A. Jan. 10, 1899."

On January 31, 1899, the Minister of Interior of the Philippine Republic, Teodoro Sandiko, signed a decree stating that President Aguinaldo had directed that all idle lands be planted to provide food for the people in view of impending war with the Americans.

== War ==
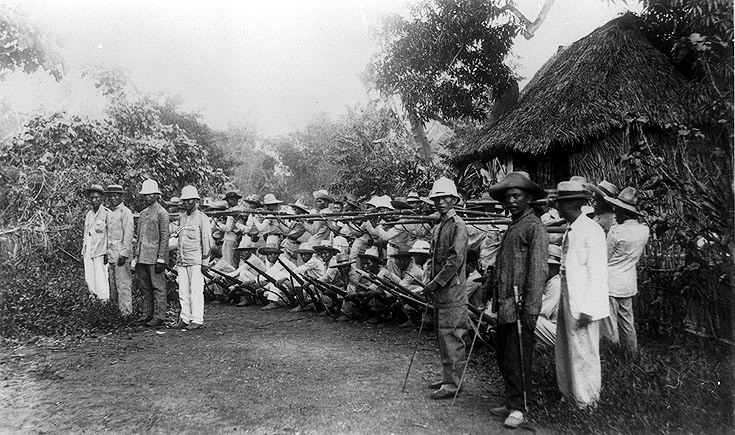
Filipino soldiers outside Manila in 1899

=== Path to war ===
In January, Sandiko was contacted by German diplomat Gotthard Klocke, leading to shipment of Krupp guns for Philippine forces. It was revealed by Chicago Tribune on February 28, 1899, while the shipment was still on its way.

On the evening of February 4, 1899, Private William W. Grayson initiated the Philippine–American War by shooting a group of Filipino soldiers at the corner of Sociego Street and Tomas Arguelles Street. A study done by Ronnie Miravite Casalmir places the event at this corner, not at Sociego-Silencio where they erroneously have the marker. The Ronnie Miravite Casalmir Study debunks the previous findings of Dr. Benito Legarda which was the basis for the erroneous placement of the marker at Sociego-Silencio. According to Ronnie Miravite Casalmir, the smoking gun for the Sociego-Arguelles corner is the presence of Blockhouse 7 in the background of Grayson's reenactment photo. The orientation of this Blockhouse 7 image lines up with the corner of Sociego and Arguelles when compared with the known photo of Blockhouse 7 taken from the same direction. In addition, the distance estimate of Lieut. Whedon placed the 100-yard distance from Santol at Sociego-Arguelles, not Sociego-Silencio. This meant that when Lieut. Whedon ordered the detachment at Santol to patrol 100 yards, he meant them to patrol all the way to Sociego-Arguelles. Col. Stotsenburg corroborated Lieut. Whedon's distance estimate. Prof. Ambeth R. Ocampo calls the evidence presented by Ronnie Miravite Casalmir as new and compelling. Prof. Ocampo agrees that this evidence shows that the marker should be moved one block away, from Sociego-Silencio to Sociego-Arguelles. Maj. Lillian A. Pfluke (Ret.), West Point Class of 1980, and founder of the American War Memorials Overseas Inc. also agrees and has a note on their U.S. War Memorials website that the proper placement of the marker should be at the adjoining intersection of Sociego Street and Arguelles Street where the incident actually occurred.

Grayson gave the following account of his initiation of hostilites:

"At 8 o'clock on the morning of February 4" . . . "I went on duty at outpost 2, which was about 100 yards from block house 7, at that time In the possession of the Filipinos and a half a mile from our headquarters in Santa Ana. Half an hour later our lieutenant and sergeant of the guard were reconnoitering along our line when several Filipinos, with a lieutenant, followed and called for a halt. They approached and began proclaiming that that was their territory. Our officers pretended not to understand their lingo and soon went on their way. I was relieved at 10 o'clock and rested until 2 o'clock, but no demonstration had been made In the meantime. All day the Filipinos were occasionally calling out vile names addressed to us Americans. They would vary this with Spanish to the effect that 'One Filipino Is equal to five Americans,' and 'Tonight we'll drive the Americans In a long way.' One of them had earlier called Stotsenberg the worst kind of a name, and it was only to avoid a conflict that the colonel did not yield to the temptation to clear every Insurgent from our front. They had no business on that side of the river anyway.

"That night, about 8 o'clock, Miller and I there were two of us were cautiously pacing our district. We came to a fence and were trying to see what the Filipinos were up to. Suddenly, near at hand on our left, there was a low but unmistakable Filipino outpost signal whistle. It was immediately answered toy a similar whistle about twenty-five yards to the right. Then the red lantern flashed its signal from blockhouse 7. We had never seen such a sign used before. In a moment something rose slowly up, not twenty feet in front of us. It was a Filipino. They were evidently moving dangerously near.

"I yelled 'Halt!' and I made it pretty loud, for I was accustomed to challenging the officer of the guard in approved military style. The man moved. I challenged him with another loud 'Halt!' Then he impudently shouted 'Halto' at me. Well, I thought the best thing to do was to shoot him. He dropped. If I didn't kill him, I guess he died of fright. Then two Filipinos sprang out of the gateway about fifteen feet from us. I called 'Halt!' and Miller fired and dropped one. I saw that another was left. Well, I think I got my second Filipino that time . . . We then retreated to the pipe line and got behind the water main and stayed there all night. It was some minutes after our second shots before the Filipinos began firing, but then they made up for it by a fusillade that showed they had been prepared for their boasted advance."

— Grayson's Story of His First Shot. Omaha Daily Bee, August 6, 1899.

The outbreak of violence triggered the 1899 Battle of Manila. Later that day, Aguinaldo declared "That peace and friendly relations with the Americans be broken and that the latter be treated as enemies, within the limits prescribed by the laws of war."

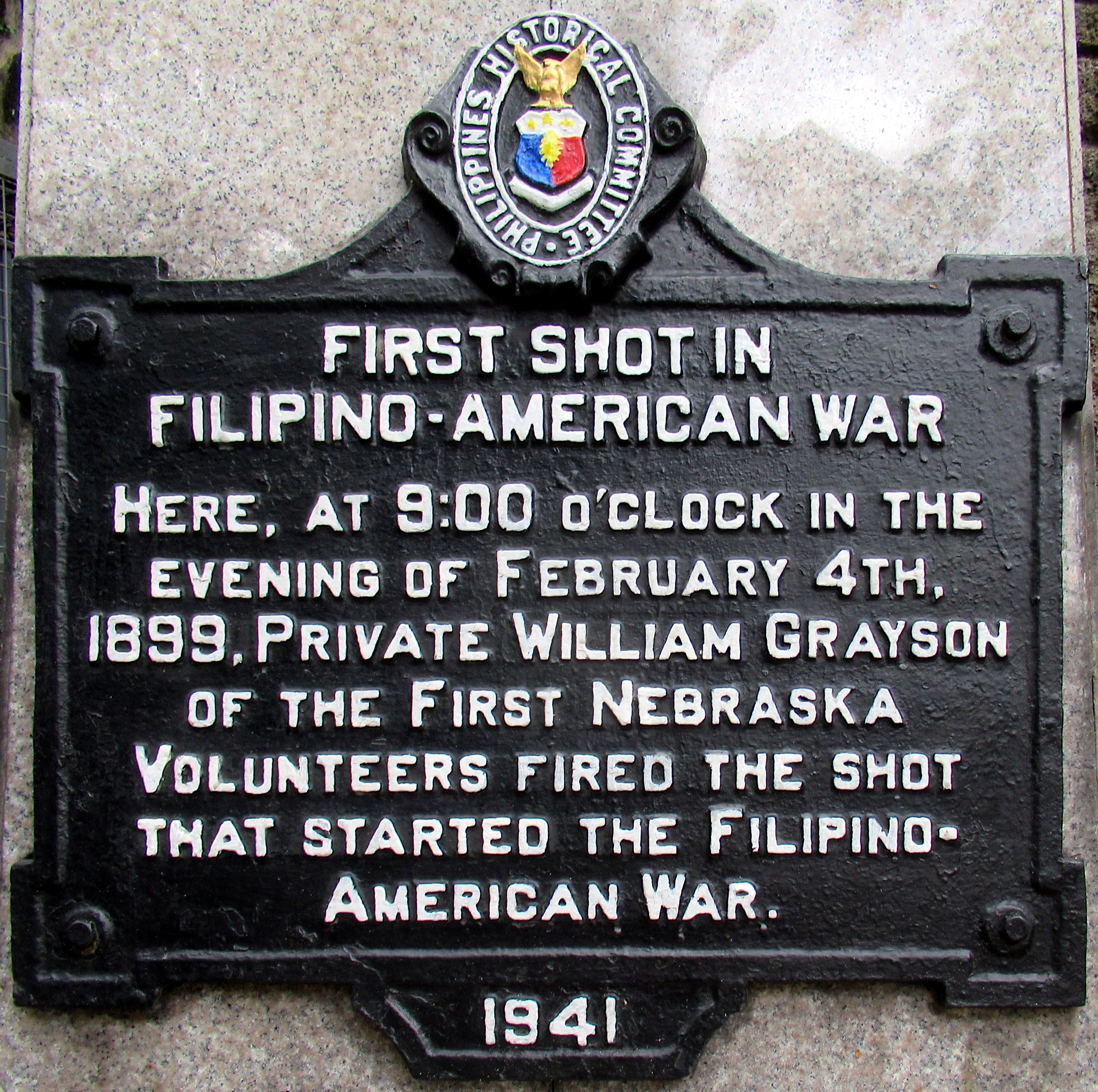
Historical marker installed by the Philippines Historical Committee in 1941 to commemorate the shot that started the war

The following day, Filipino General Isidoro Torres came through the lines under a flag of truce to deliver a message from Aguinaldo to General Otis that the fighting had begun accidentally, and that Aguinaldo wished for the hostilities to cease immediately and for the establishment of a neutral zone. Otis dismissed these overtures, and replied that the "fighting, having begun, must go on to the grim end". On February 5, General Arthur MacArthur ordered his troops to advance against Filipino troops.

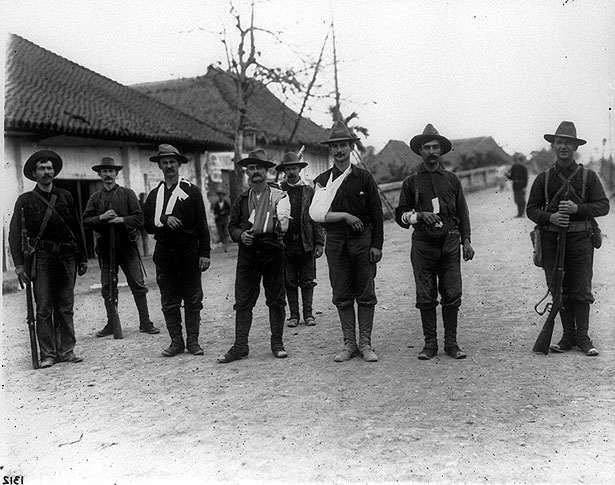
Wounded American soldiers at Santa Mesa, Manila in 1899

In the U.S., President McKinley had created a commission chaired by Jacob Gould Schurman on January 20 (Note: The First Philippine Commission, sometimes referred to as the Schurman Commission) and tasked it to study the situation in the Philippines and make recommendations on how the U.S. should proceed. Members included General Otis and two other civilian appointees. The three civilian members of the commission arrived in Manila on March 4, 1899, a month after hostilities began.

General Otis viewed the arrival of his fellow commission members as an intrusion and boycotted commission meetings. The civilian members of the commission spent a month meeting with Ilustrados who had deserted the Philippine government, as well as studying the Malolos Constitution and other government documents. Meanwhile, with U.S. forces advancing northwards from Manila, the seat of Aguinaldo's revolutionary government had been moved from Malolos to San Isidro, Nueva Ecija. When Malolos fell at the end of March, it moved further north to San Fernando, Pampanga.

The commission published a proclamation containing assurances that the U.S. did not intend exploitation of Filipinos, but their "advancement to a position among the most civilized peoples of the world", and announced "that the United States is ... anxious to establish in the Philippine Islands an enlightened system of government under which the Philippine people may enjoy the largest measure of home rule and the amplest liberty."

Though not authorized to discuss an armistice, civilian commission members held informal discussions with a representative of Aguinaldo. Progress on a path without war ended after General Luna arrested Aguinaldo's then-cabinet and replaced it with a more hawkish one headed by Apolinario Mabini. (Note: See the Schurman Commission § Survey visit to the Philippines article for more detail.) On June 2, 1899, the First Philippine Republic declared war on the United States.

=== American strategy ===
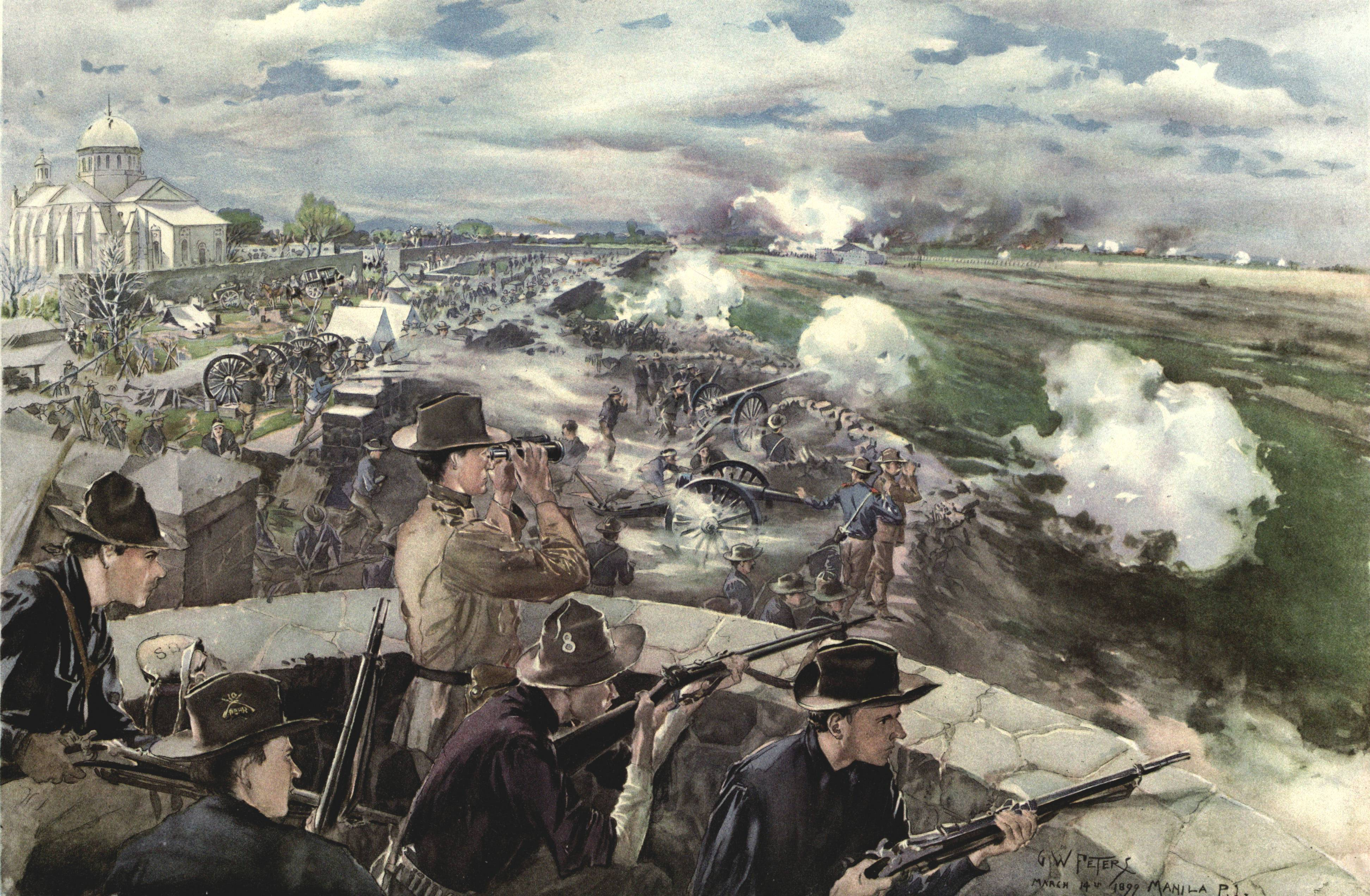
The Battle of Caloocan, February 10, 1899. Major General Arthur MacArthur with binoculars at the front line.

Senator Albert J. Beveridge, a prominent American imperialist, said: "Americans altruistically went to war with Spain to liberate Cubans, Puerto Ricans, and Filipinos from their tyrannical yoke. If they lingered on too long in the Philippines, it was to protect the Filipinos from European predators waiting in the wings for an American withdrawal and to tutor them in American-style democracy."

On February 11, 1899, one week after the first shots were fired, Iloilo was bombarded by American naval forces from the USS Petrel (PG-2) and the USS Baltimore (C-3). Filipino forces lit the town on fire before retreating. The city was captured by ground forces led by Brigadier General Marcus Miller, with no loss of American lives. 25 to 30 Filipinos were wounded. The "native" part of the city was almost entirely destroyed.

Months later, after finally securing Manila, American forces moved northward, engaging in combat at the brigade and battalion level in pursuit of the fleeing insurgent forces. In response to the use of guerrilla warfare tactics by Filipino forces, beginning in September 1899, American military strategy shifted to suppression of the resistance. Tactics became focused on the control of key areas with internment and segregation of the civilian population in "zones of protection" from the guerrillas. Many of the interned civilians died from dysentery.

General Otis gained notoriety for some of his actions. Although his superiors had directed Otis to avoid military conflict, he did little to prevent war. Otis refused to accept anything but unconditional surrender from the Philippine Army. He often made major military decisions without first consulting Washington. He acted aggressively in dealing with the Filipinos under the assumption that their resistance would collapse quickly. Even after this assumption proved false, he continued to insist that the insurgency had been defeated, and that the remaining casualties were caused by "isolated bands of outlaws".

Otis was also active in suppressing information about American military tactics. When letters describing American atrocities reached the American media, Otis had each press clipping forwarded to the original writer's commanding officer, who would convince or force the soldier to retract his statements.

=== Filipino strategy ===
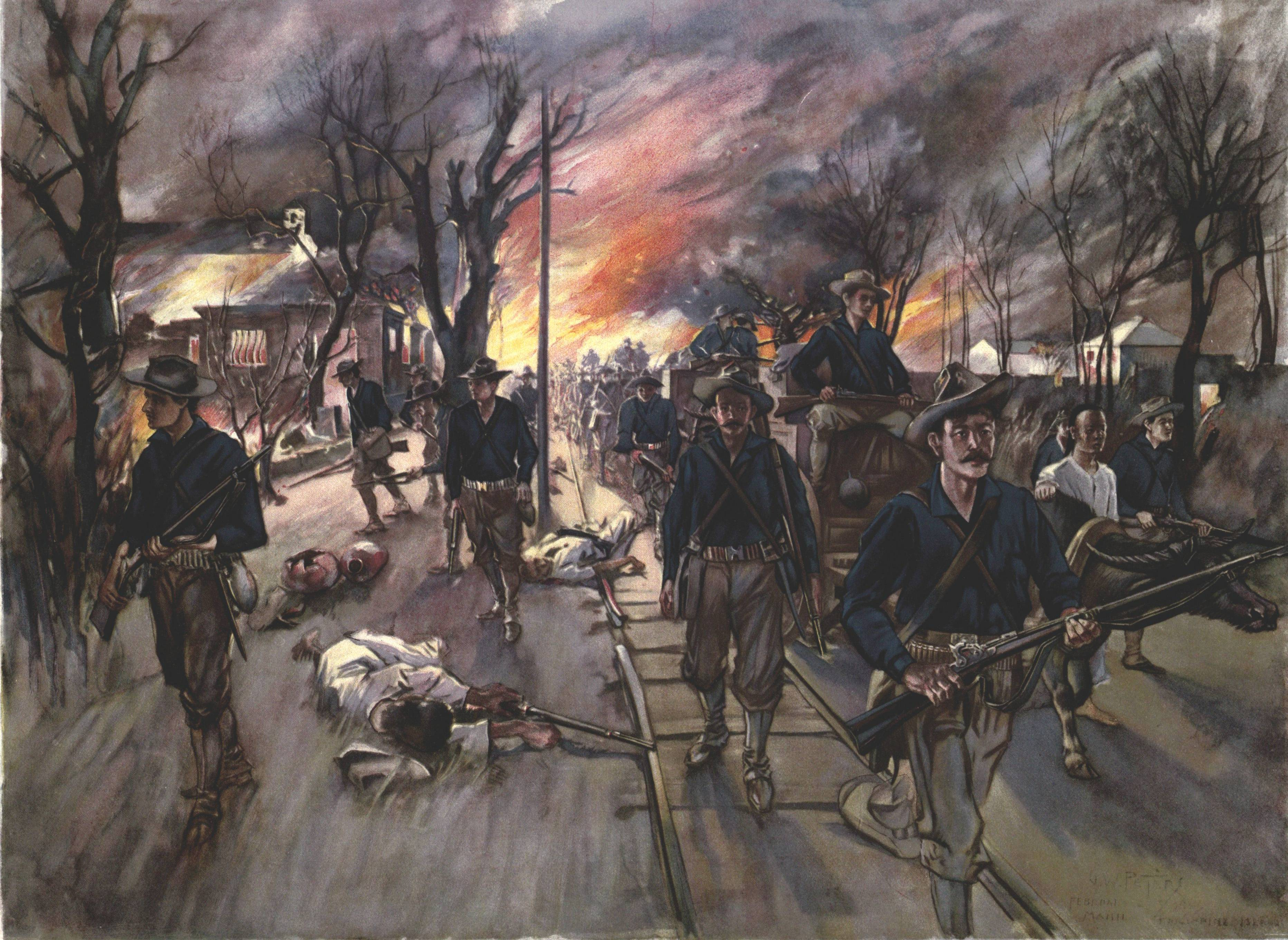
20th Kansas Volunteers marching through Caloocan at night, 1899

Estimates of the Filipino forces vary between 80,000 and 100,000, with tens of thousands of auxiliaries. Most of the forces were armed only with bolo knives, bows and arrows, spears, and other primitive weapons, which were vastly inferior to the guns and other weapons of the American forces.

A fairly rigid indigenous caste system existed in the Philippines before the Spanish colonial era, which partially survived among the natives during Spanish rule. The goal, or end-state, sought by the First Philippine Republic was a sovereign, independent, stable, and egalitarian nation. In practice, local chieftains, landowners, businessmen, and cabezas de barangay were the principales who administered local politics. The war was at its peak when ilustrados, principales, and peasants were unified in opposition to annexation by the United States. The peasants, who represented the majority of the fighting forces, had interests different from their ilustrado leaders and the principales of their villages. Coupled with the ethnic and geographic fragmentation, aligning the interests of people from different social castes was a daunting task. The challenge for Aguinaldo and his generals was to sustain unified Filipino public opposition; this was the revolutionaries' strategic center of gravity.

The Filipino operational center of gravity was the ability to sustain its force of 100,000 irregulars in the field. The Filipino general Francisco Macabulos described the Filipinos' war aim as, "not to vanquish the U.S. Army but to inflict on them constant losses". In the early stages of the war, the Philippine Army employed the conventional military tactics typical of an organized armed resistance. The hope was to inflict enough American casualties to result in McKinley's defeat by William Jennings Bryan in the 1900 presidential election. They hoped that Bryan, who held strong anti-imperialist views, would withdraw the American forces from the Philippines.

McKinley's election victory in 1900 was demoralizing for the Filipinos, and convinced many Filipinos that the United States would not depart quickly. Coupled with a series of devastating losses on the battlefield against American forces equipped with superior technology and training, Aguinaldo became convinced that he needed to change his approach. Beginning on September 14, 1899, Aguinaldo accepted the advice of General Gregorio del Pilar and authorized the use of guerrilla warfare tactics in subsequent military operations in Bulacan.

=== Guerrilla war phase ===
For most of 1899, the revolutionary leadership had viewed guerrilla warfare strategically only as a tactical option of final recourse, not as a means of operation which better suited their disadvantaged situation. On November 13, 1899, Aguinaldo decreed that guerrilla warfare would henceforth be the strategy. (Note: Aguinaldo retained command in norther Luzon and placed Major Generals Mariano Trias and Pantaleon Garcia over central and southern Luzon respectively.) This made American occupation of the Philippine archipelago all the more difficult over the next few years. During the first four months of the guerrilla war, the Americans had nearly 500 casualties. The Philippine Army began staging bloody ambushes and raids, such as the guerrilla victories at Paye, Catubig, Makahambus Hill, Pulang Lupa, and Mabitac. At first, it seemed that the Filipinos might be able to fight the Americans to a stalemate and force them to withdraw. President McKinley considered withdrawal when the guerrilla raids began.

=== Martial law ===
On December 20, 1900, MacArthur, who had succeeded Elwell Otis as U.S. Military Governor on May 5, placed the Philippines under martial law, invoking U.S. Army General Order 100. He announced that guerrilla abuses would no longer be tolerated and outlined the rights which would govern the U.S. Army's treatment of guerrillas and civilians. In particular, guerrillas who wore no uniform but peasant dress and shifted from civilian to military status would be held accountable; secret committees that collected revolutionary taxes and those accepting U.S. protection in occupied towns while assisting guerrillas would be treated as "war rebels or war traitors". Filipino leaders who continued to work towards Philippine independence were deported to Guam.

=== Decline and fall of the First Philippine Republic ===
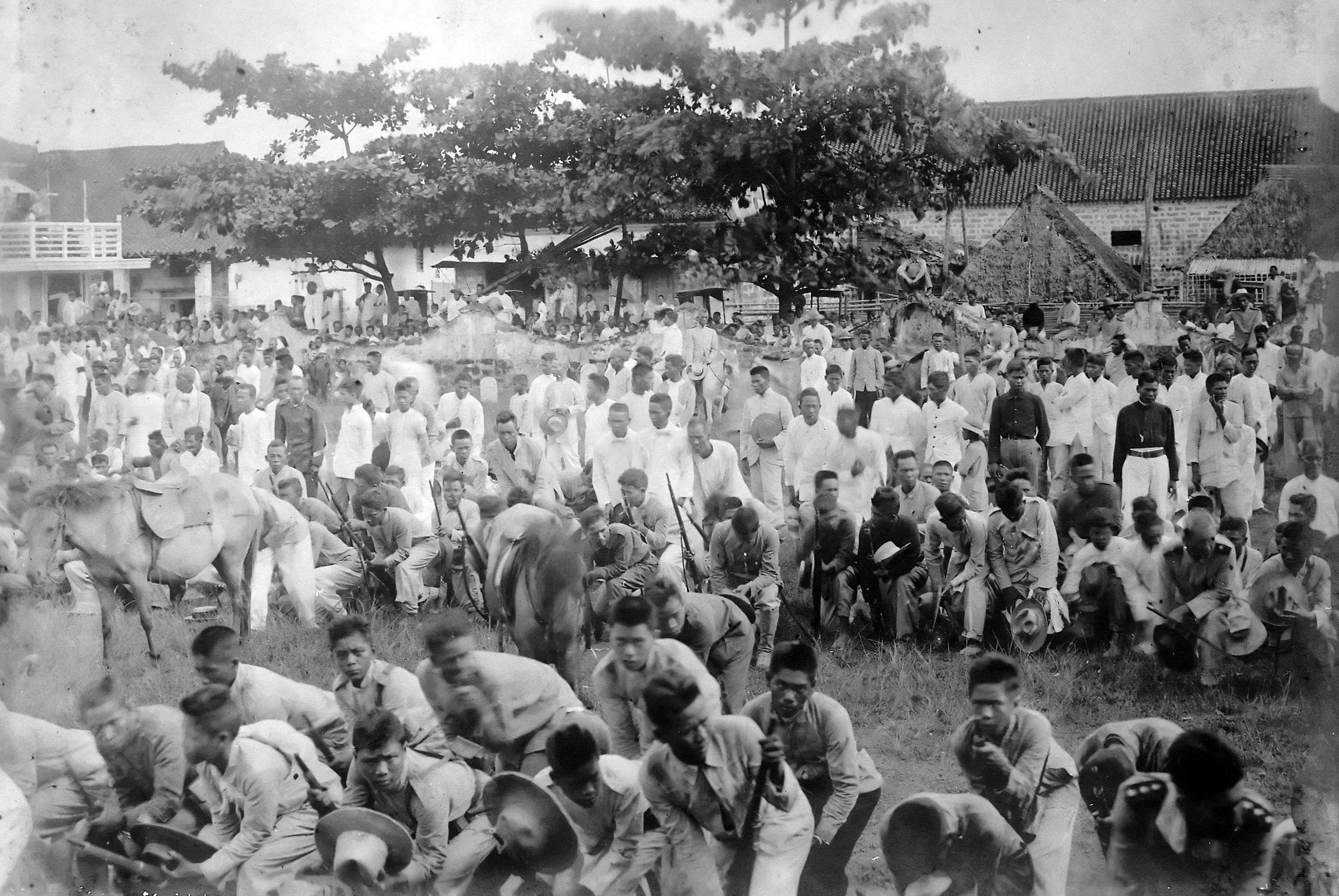
A group of Filipino combatants laying down their weapons during their surrender, c. 1900

The Philippine Army continued suffering defeats from the better armed United States Army during the conventional warfare phase, forcing Aguinaldo to continually change his base of operations throughout the course of the war.

On June 24, 1900, MacArthur as U.S. Military Governor published a proclamation offering full and complete amnesty to all insurgents who surrendered within ninety days.

On August 3, 1900, Aguinaldo issued a decree urging a continuation of the war and offering rewards for rifles and ammunition brought in by prisoners or deserters from opposing forces.

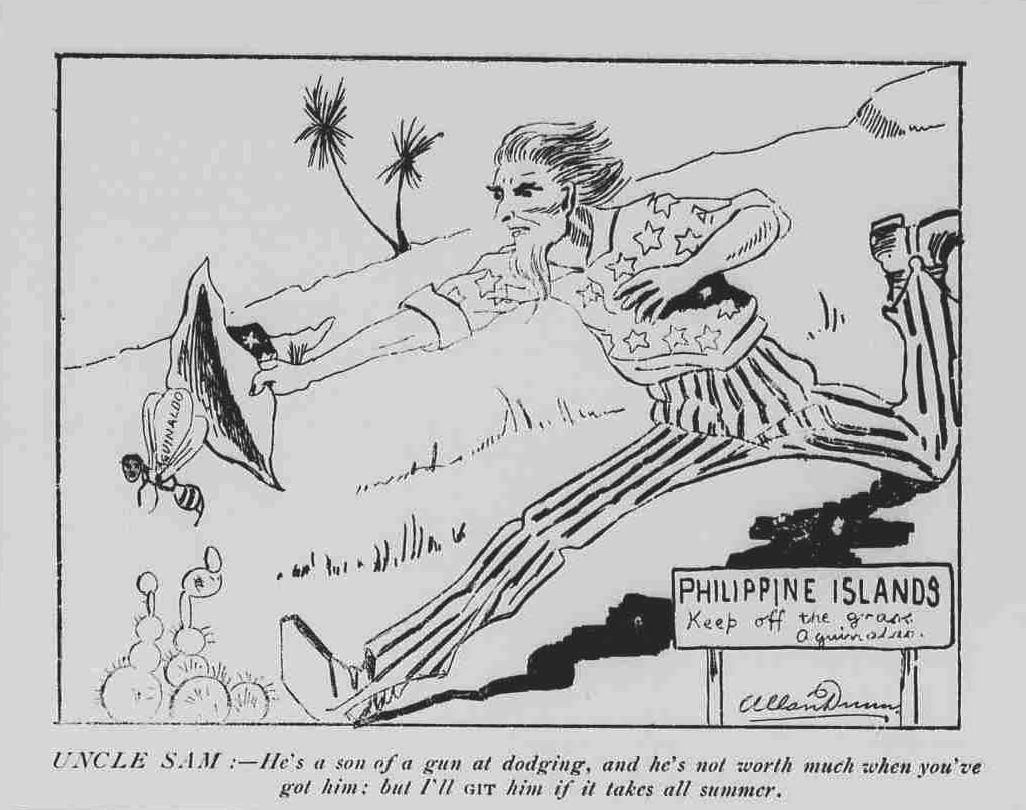
Personifying the United States, Uncle Sam chases a bee representing Emilio Aguinaldo.

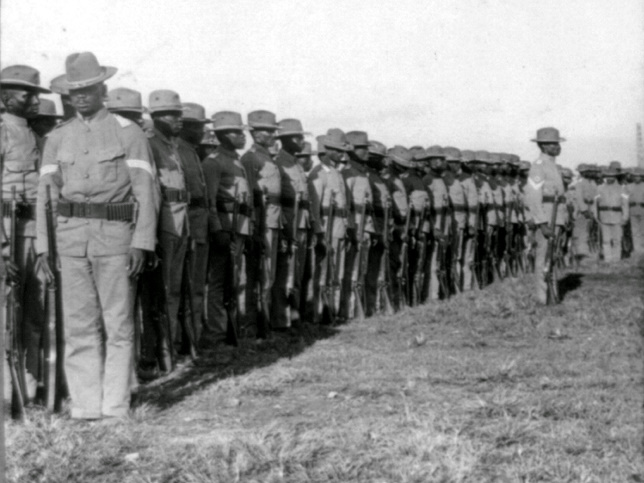
The 24th U.S. Infantry (primarily made up of African American soldiers) at drill in Camp Walker, Cebu, 1902

On March 23, 1901, General Frederick Funston and his troops captured Aguinaldo in Palanan, Isabela, with the help of some Filipinos (called the Macabebe Scouts after their home locale) who had joined the Americans. The Americans pretended to be captives of the Scouts, who were dressed in Philippine Army uniforms. Once Funston and his "captors" entered Aguinaldo's camp, they quickly overwhelmed Aguinaldo's forces.

On April 1, 1901, at Malacañang Palace in Manila, Aguinaldo swore an oath accepting the authority of the United States over the Philippines and pledging his allegiance to the American government. On April 19, he issued a Proclamation of Formal Surrender to the United States, telling his followers to lay down their weapons and give up the fight.

"Let the stream of blood cease to flow; let there be an end to tears and desolation," Aguinaldo said. "The lesson which the war holds out and the significance of which I realized only recently, leads me to the firm conviction that the complete termination of hostilities and a lasting peace are not only desirable but also absolutely essential for the well-being of the Philippines."

The capture of Aguinaldo dealt a severe blow to the Filipino cause, but not as much as the Americans had hoped. General Miguel Malvar took over the leadership of the Filipino government. He originally had taken a defensive stance against the Americans, but launched an offensive against the American-held towns in the Batangas region. General Vicente Lukbán in Samar, and other army officers, continued the war in their respective areas.

=== Establishment of U.S. civil government ===
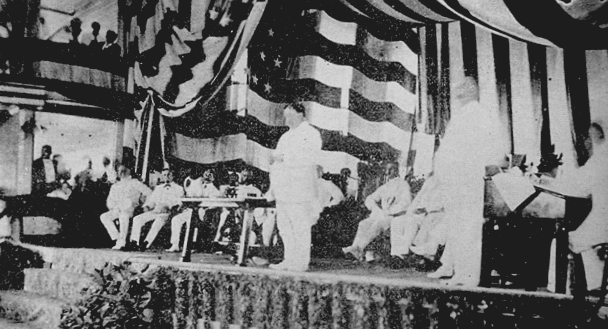
Governor General William Howard Taft addressing the audience at the Philippine Assembly in the Manila Grand Opera House

On March 3, 1901, the U.S. Congress passed the Army Appropriation Act containing (along with the Platt Amendment on Cuba) the Spooner Amendment which provided the president with legislative authority to establish a civil government in the Philippines. Up until this time, the president had been administering the Philippines by virtue of his war powers. On July 4, 1901, the office of U.S. Military Governor was terminated and civil government was inaugurated with William Howard Taft as civil governor. Hostilities continued, and the civil governor shared power and control with the U.S. military government.

A centralized public school system was installed in 1901, using English as the medium of instruction. This created a heavy shortage of teachers, and the Philippine Commission authorized the secretary of public instruction to engage 600 teachers from the U.S. – the so-called Thomasites. Free primary schools that instructed on duties of citizenship and avocation was introduced. The Catholic Church was officially disestablished, and much church land was purchased and redistributed.

An anti-sedition law was established in 1901, followed by an anti-brigandage law in 1902.

=== Official end of the war ===
On July 4, 1902, Theodore Roosevelt, who had succeeded to the U.S. presidency, proclaimed officially that the war was at an end and extended a full and complete pardon and amnesty to all persons in the Philippine Archipelago who had participated in the conflict.

On April 9, 2002, Philippine President Gloria Macapagal Arroyo proclaimed that the Philippine–American War had ended on April 16, 1902, with the surrender of Malvar. She declared the centennial anniversary of that date as a national working holiday and as a special non-working holiday in the province of Batangas and in the cities of Batangas, Lipa, and Tanauan.

The Kiram–Bates Treaty secured the Sultanate of Sulu. American forces also established control over interior mountainous areas that had resisted Spanish conquest.

=== Internal weaknesses ===
Historians Glenn May in 1983 and Rene Escalante in 1998 conclude that Aguinaldo's cause had multiple fatal weaknesses: they blame his inept political leadership; his strategic and tactical military blunders; his loss of mass support; his alienation of the Catholics; his failure to mobilize the Filipino elite; squabbling and corruption among his generals; and failure to win any international support for his cause.

== Casualties ==
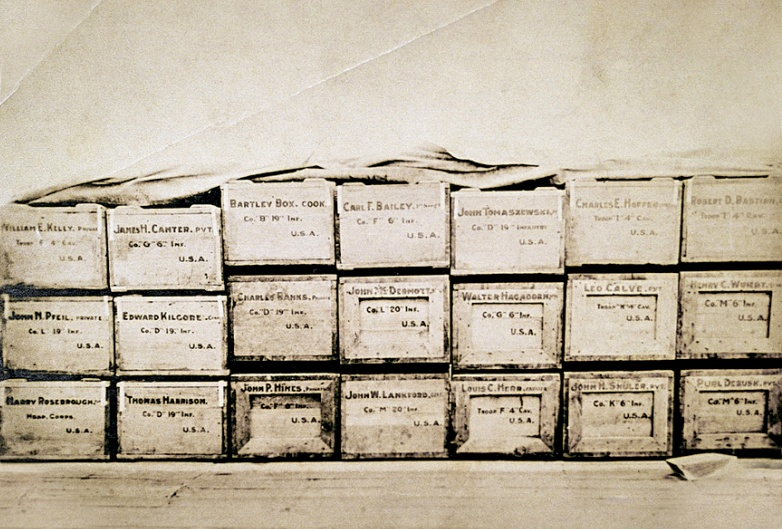
A stack of coffins containing dead American soldiers

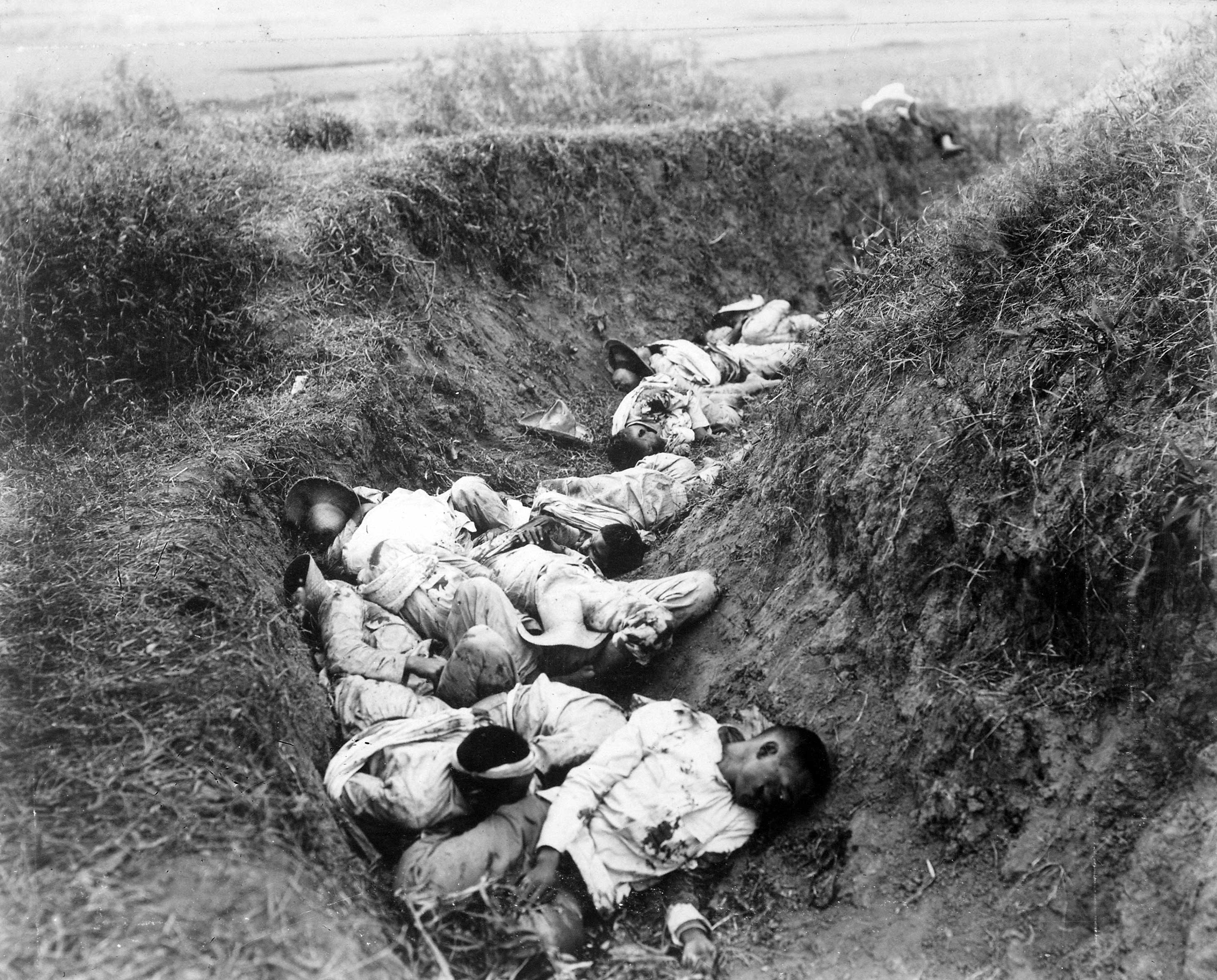
Filipino casualties on the first day of the war

Filipino casualties were much greater than among Americans. The United States Department of State states that the war "resulted in the death of over 4,200 American and over 20,000 Filipino combatants", and that "as many as 200,000 Filipino civilians died from violence, famine, and disease". The total number of Filipinos who died remains a matter of debate. Modern sources cite a figure of 200,000 dead civilian Filipinos, with most losses attributable to famine and disease. A cholera epidemic at the war's end killed between 150,000 and 200,000 people. According to Andrea Pitzer, over 11,000 Filipinos died in concentration camps.

Some estimates reach 1,000,000 dead. Filipino scholar Luzviminda Francisco cites an alleged interview in The New York Times with General James M. Bell, who commanded forces in a part of southern Luzon, in May 1901 where it was said he suggested that "over 600,000 people in Luzon alone had been killed or had died of disease as a result of the war". Francisco also cites the forced incarceration of a reported 300,000 people in the province of Albay, and allegations of war crimes in Mindanao and high death rates in Bilibid Prison to raise doubts of the validity of, then, accepted casualty figures for the war. Historian John M. Gates has described the figure of 600,000 as unfounded and exaggerated. According to Gates, the maximum possible number of war-related deaths in the Philippines between 1898 and 1903 is 321,000 based on American and Spanish census data. In 1903 the population of the Philippines was counted by American authorities. The survey yielded 7,635,426 people, including 56,138 foreign born. In 1887, a Spanish census recorded a population of 5,984,717 excluding non-Christians. Filipino scholar, Vincente L. Rafael, noted that U.S. control over the Philippines "included extending colonial control to two areas where the Spaniards had chronically failed: the Moro areas of the south and the Cordillera mountains in the North."

Rudolph Rummel estimates that 16,000 to 20,000 Filipino soldiers and 34,000 civilians were killed, with up to an additional 200,000 civilian deaths, mostly from a cholera epidemic.

In terms of civilian casualties, historian Glen May in an in-depth study one province, argues that the demographic environment was very negative in 1897–1902, as the death rate soared. The main causes were malnutrition caused by massive crop failures, and epidemics of cholera and malaria.

In the course of the conflict, desertion became a problem for the U.S. Army. Seventeen American soldiers were sentenced to death for desertion. However, only two sentences, applied to African American soldiers (Edmund DuBose and Lewis Russell of the 9th Cavalry Regiment, who had been convicted of far more serious charges of desertion to the enemy, in 1902, were carried out. These were the last American soldiers to be executed for desertion until the execution of Private Eddie Slovik during the Second World War.

== Atrocities ==
=== American atrocities ===
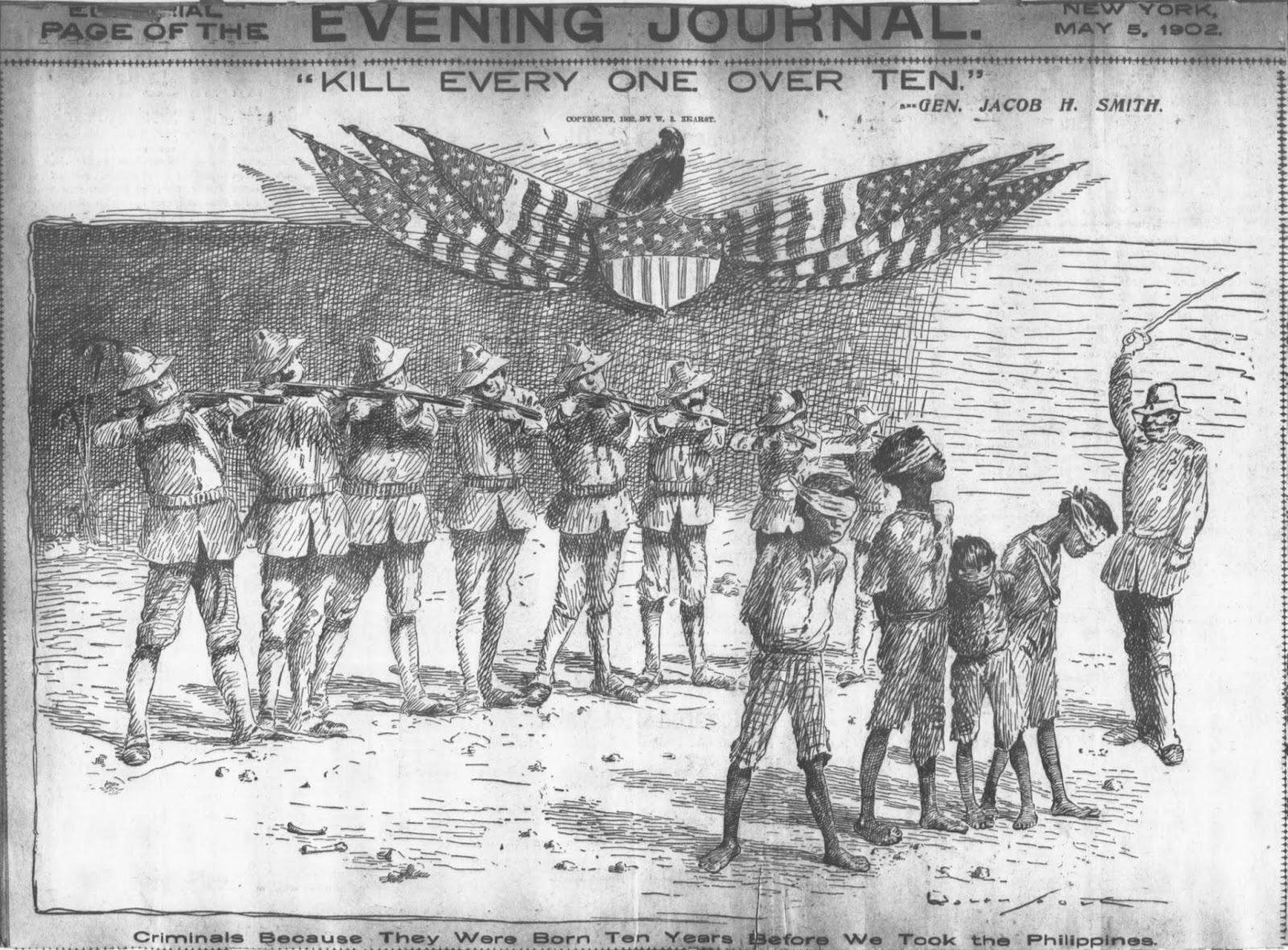
Brigadier General Jacob H. Smith's infamous order during the pacification of Samar following the Balangiga massacre, "KILL EVERY ONE OVER TEN", became the caption in the New York Journal cartoon on May 5, 1902. The Old Glory draped an American shield on which a vulture replaced the bald eagle. The caption at the bottom proclaimed, "Criminals Because They Were Born Ten Years Before We Took the Philippines".

Throughout the war, numerous atrocities were committed by the U.S. military, including the targeting of civilians. American soldiers and other witnesses sent letters home that described some of these atrocities. For example, In 1902, the Manila correspondent of the Philadelphia Ledger wrote:

The present war is no bloodless, opera bouffe engagement; our men have been relentless, have killed to exterminate men, women, children, prisoners and captives, active insurgents and suspected people from lads of ten up, the idea prevailing that the Filipino as such was little better than a dog...

Reports from returning soldiers stated that upon entering a village, American soldiers would ransack every house and church and rob the inhabitants of everything of value, while Filipinos who approached the battle line waving a flag of truce were fired upon.

Some of the authors were critical of leaders such as Major General Otis and the overall conduct of the war. In 1899, the American Anti-Imperialist League published a pamphlet of letters allegedly written by U.S. soldiers. When some of these letters circulated in newspapers, they became national news, which forced the War Department to investigate. Examples:

- A soldier from New York: "The town of Titatia was surrendered to us a few days ago, and two companies occupy the same. Last night one of our boys was found shot and his stomach cut open. Immediately orders were received from General Wheaton to burn the town and kill every native in sight; which was done to a finish. About 1,000 men, women and children were reported killed. I am probably growing hard-hearted, for I am in my glory when I can sight my gun on some dark skin and pull the trigger."
- Corporal Sam Gillis: "We make everyone get into his house by seven p.m., and we only tell a man once. If he refuses we shoot him. We killed over 300 natives the first night. They tried to set the town on fire. If they fire a shot from the house we burn the house down and every house near it, and shoot the natives, so they are pretty quiet in town now."

Major General Otis' investigation of the content of these letters consisted of sending a copy of them to the author's superior and having him force the author to write a retraction. Soldiers such as Private Charles Brenner refused and he was court-martialed. The charge was "for writing and conniving at the publication of an article which ... contains willful falsehoods concerning himself and a false charge against Captain Bishop." Not all such letters that discussed atrocities were intended to criticize General Otis or American actions. Many portrayed U.S. actions as the result of Filipino provocation and thus entirely justified. During the war, desertion was a problem for the US Army. Seventeen American soldiers were sentenced to death for desertion, though only two were executed.

In September 1901, enraged by the Balangiga massacre in Samar, Brigadier General Jacob H. Smith retaliated during the pacification of Samar by ordering an indiscriminate attack upon its inhabitants, openly disregarding General Order 100, and issuing an order to "kill everyone over the age of ten" and turn the island into a "howling wilderness". Major Littleton Waller countermanded the order to his own men saying, "we are not making war on women and children". Still, 2,000 to 2,500 Filipino civilians were killed in the expedition across Samar. This became a caption in the New York Journal-American cartoon on May 5, 1902. Smith was eventually court-martialed by the American military and forced to retire.

In late 1901, Brigadier General J. Franklin Bell took command of American operations in Batangas and Laguna provinces. In response to Malvar's guerrilla warfare tactics, Bell employed counterinsurgency tactics (described by some as a scorched earth campaign) during the pacification of Batangas that took a heavy toll on guerrilla fighters and civilians. "Zones of protection" were established, and civilians were given identification papers and forced into concentration camps (called reconcentrados) surrounded by free-fire zones. At the Lodge Committee, in an attempt to counter the negative reception in America to Brigadier General Bell's camps, Colonel Arthur Wagner, the U.S. Army's chief public relations officer, insisted the camps were to "protect friendly natives from the insurgents, and assure them an adequate food supply" while teaching them "proper sanitary standards". Wagner's assertion was undermined by a letter from a commander of one of the camps, who described them as "some suburb of Hell".

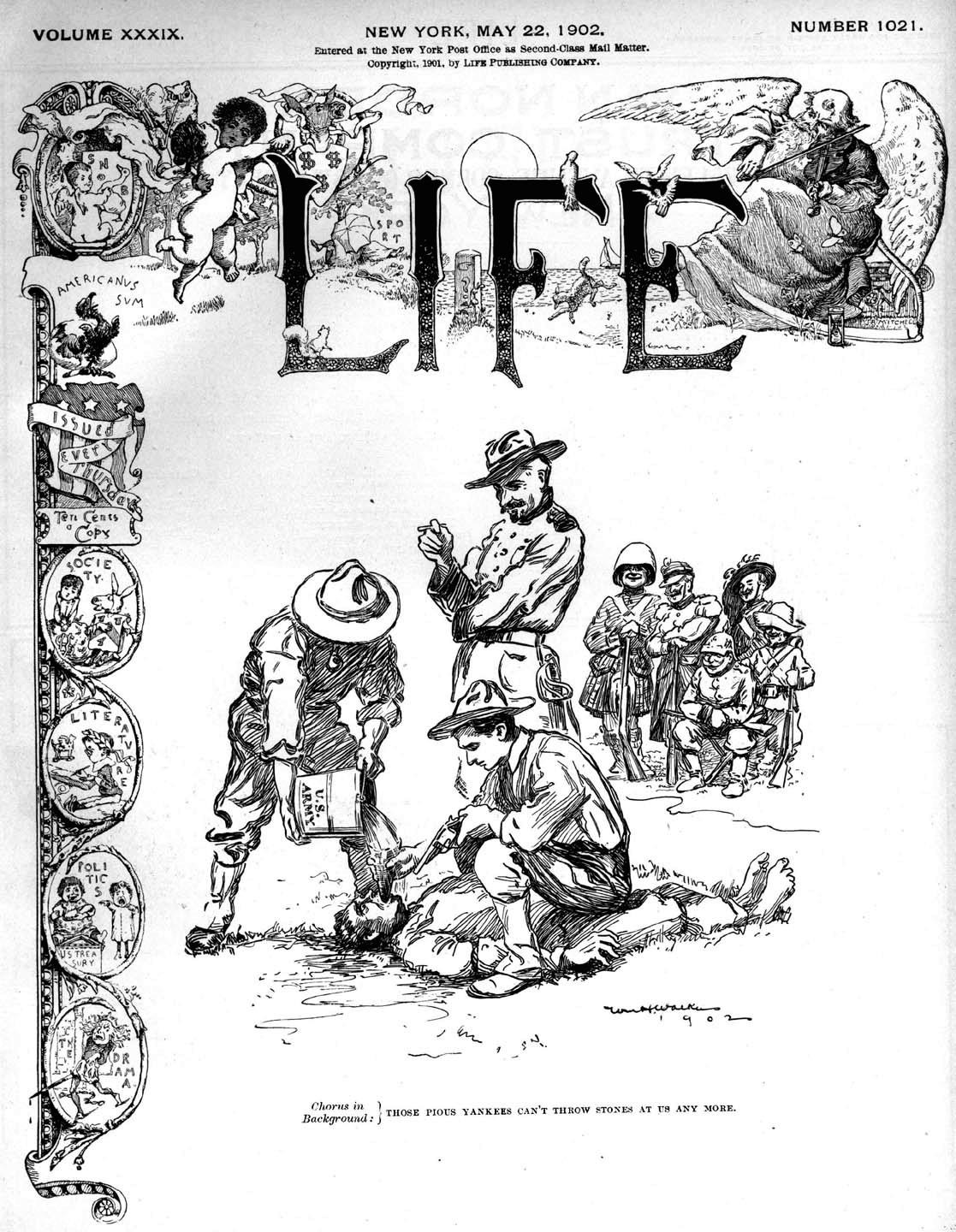
1902 Life magazine cover, depicting water curing by U.S. Army troops in the Philippines

Methods of torture such as the water cure were frequently employed during interrogation, Roosevelt privately characterized this as "an old Filipino method of mild torture" with minimal harm, especially when compared to the "incredible torture" he claimed Filipinos inflicted upon Americans. Entire villages were burned or otherwise destroyed.

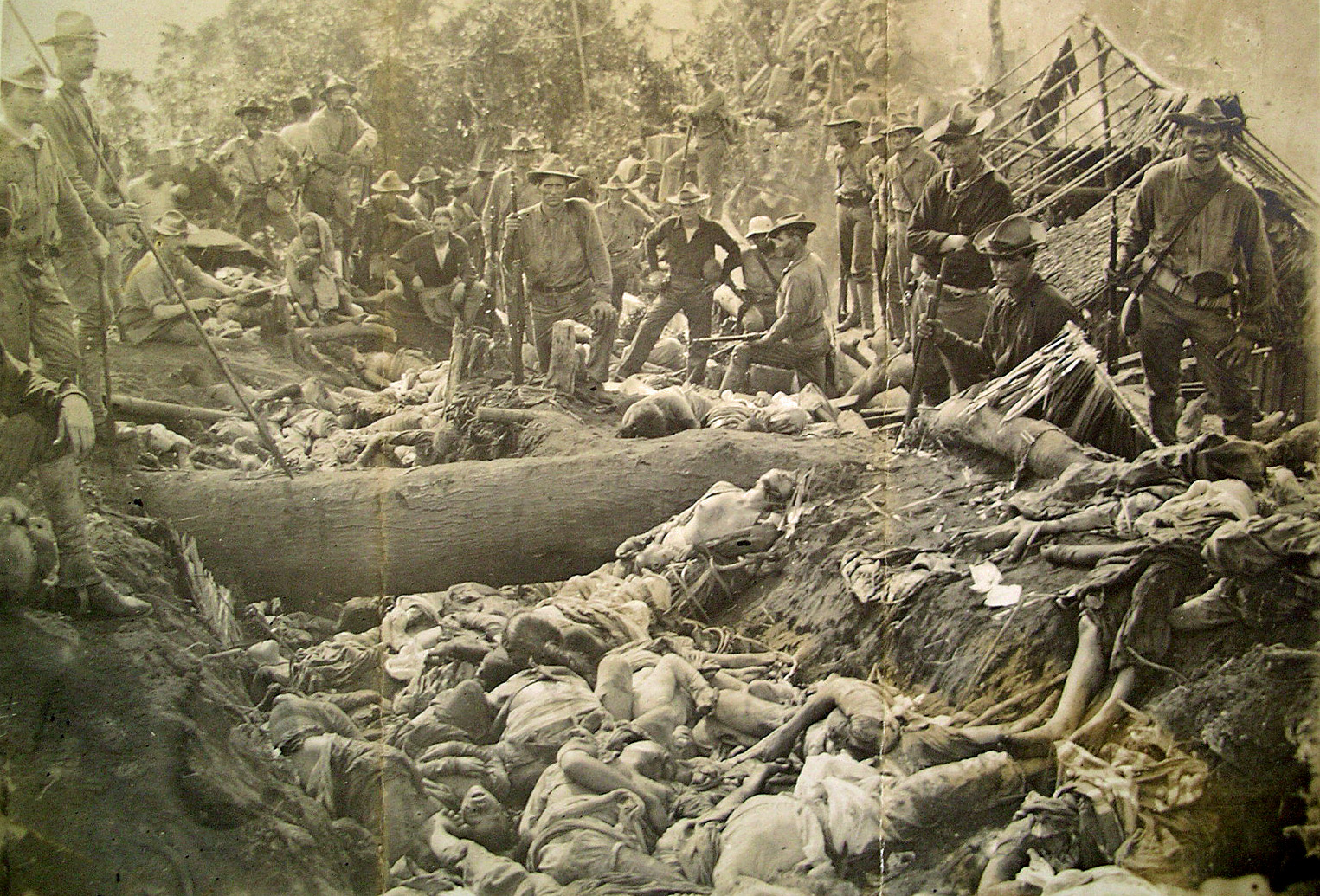
Aftermath of the First Battle of Bud Dajo in March 1906, in which up to 900 civilians, including women and children, were killed

During the First Battle of Bud Dajo in March 1906, 800–900 Moros, including women and children, were killed by U.S. Marines led by Major General Leonard Wood. The description of the engagement as a "battle" is disputed because of the overwhelming firepower of the attackers and the lopsided casualties; 99% of Moros were killed in the attack, with only six survivors. Author Vic Hurley wrote, "By no stretch of the imagination could Bud Dajo be termed a 'battle'". Mark Twain commented, "In what way was it a battle? It has no resemblance to a battle ... We cleaned up our four days' work and made it complete by butchering these helpless people."

Racial hostility significantly fueled atrocities, with American forces commonly using derogatory terms like 'nigger' and 'Indian.' The latter term carried heavy association with the recent Indian Wars. Numerous high ranking U.S. personnel in the Philippines had previously served in the Indian Wars and employed harsh methods reminiscent of events in those wars like the 1890 Wounded Knee massacre. Justification for atrocities was often sought by portraying the Filipino guerillas as cruel. President Roosevelt, for instance, contended that the insurgents' behaved with "cruelty, treachery and total disregard of the rules of civilized warfare". Other officials, notably David Prescott Barrows defended U.S. conduct and dismissed accounts of atrocities by minimizing the use of the water cure, justifying the burning of villages, and defending the policy of reconcentration, despite its similarities to Spanish tactics during the Cuban War of Independence as well as British tactics in the Second Boer War. He also expressed admiration for General Smith, despite his actions in Samar. There were deep divisions within American society regarding the conduct of the war.

Even after the war, the presentation of Filipino people to the American public was targeted at highlighting their "uncivilized" nature in humiliating exhibits that presented the image that the Philippines desperately needed American supervision. In the 1904 St. Louis World's Fair, native Filipino tribes were compensated for their participation in a 47-acre "Human Zoo" exhibit, featuring people dressed in loincloths and Philippine Constabulary uniforms. Its purpose was to showcase the success of American progress by presenting the nation it had acquired through the Spanish-American and Philippine-American wars, as well as highlight how said nation needed American assistance.

=== Filipino atrocities ===
U.S. Army Major General Otis alleged that Filipinos tortured American prisoners of war in "fiendish fashion". According to Otis, many were buried alive or were buried up to their necks in ant hills. He claimed others had their genitals removed and stuffed into their mouths and were then executed by suffocation or bled to death. Stories in other newspapers described deliberate attacks by Filipino sharpshooters upon American surgeons, chaplains, ambulances, hospitals, and wounded soldiers. An incident was described in The San Francisco Call that occurred in Escalante, Negros Occidental, where several crewmen of a landing party from the CS Recorder were fired upon and later disemboweled by Filipino insurgents, while the insurgents displayed a flag of truce.

It was reported that Spanish priests were mutilated before their congregations, and Filipinos who refused to support Aguinaldo were slaughtered in the thousands. American newspaper headlines announced the "Murder and Rapine" by the "Fiendish Filipinos". Brigadier General Joseph Wheeler insisted that Filipinos had mutilated their own dead, murdered women and children, and burned down villages, solely to discredit American soldiers. Apolinario Mabini, in his autobiography, confirms these offenses, stating that Aguinaldo did not punish Filipino troops who engaged in war rape, burned and looted villages, or stole and destroyed private property.

Other Filipino atrocities included those attributed by the Americans to Filipino commander Lukbán, who allegedly masterminded the Balangiga massacre in Samar province, a surprise Filipino attack that killed almost fifty American soldiers. Media reports stated that many bodies were mutilated.

Testimony before the Lodge Committee stated that natives were given the water cure, "... in order to secure information of the murder of Private O'Herne of Company I, who had been not only killed, but roasted and otherwise tortured before death ensued."

In his History of the Filipino People, Agoncillo writes that Filipino troops could match/exceed American brutality. Kicking, slapping, and spitting at faces were common. In some cases, ears and noses were cut off and salt applied to the wounds. In other cases, captives were buried alive. These atrocities occurred regardless of Aguinaldo's orders and circulars concerning the treatment of prisoners.

Worcester recounts two specific Filipino atrocities as follows:

A detachment, marching through Leyte, found an American who had disappeared a short time before crucified, head down. His abdominal wall had been carefully opened so that his intestines might hang down in his face. Another American prisoner, found on the same trip, had been buried in the ground with only his head projecting. His mouth had been propped open with a stick, a trail of sugar laid to it through the forest, and a handful thrown into it. Millions of ants had done the rest.

== Political atmosphere ==
=== First Philippine Commission ===
The Schurman Commission unilaterally proclaimed that "... The Filipinos are wholly unprepared for independence ... there being no Philippine nation, but only a collection of different peoples." In the report that they issued to McKinley the following year, the commissioners acknowledged Filipino aspirations for independence; they declared, however, that the Philippines was not ready for it. This conclusion was affected in part by the fact that they did not understand the structure of the Philippine government, which was based upon European and Latin American principles foreign to Americans. Specific recommendations included the establishment of civilian control over Manila (Otis would have veto power over the city's government), creation of civilian government as rapidly as possible, especially in areas already declared "pacified", including the establishment of a bicameral legislature, autonomous governments on the provincial and municipal levels, and a system of free public elementary schools. These recommendations were made in the face of the representative Congress, municipal and provincial governments, and public education system instituted and managed by the Philippine government from the time of the Revolutionary Government onwards.

On November 2, 1900, Schurman signed the following statement:

Should our power by any fatality be withdrawn, the commission believe that the government of the Philippines would speedily lapse into anarchy, which would excuse, if it did not necessitate, the intervention of other powers and the eventual division of the islands among them. Only through American occupation, therefore, is the idea of a free, self-governing, and united Philippine commonwealth at all conceivable. And the indispensable need from the Filipino point of view of maintaining American sovereignty over the archipelago is recognized by all intelligent Filipinos and even by those insurgents who desire an American protectorate. The latter, it is true, would take the revenues and leave us the responsibilities. Nevertheless, they recognize the indubitable fact that the Filipinos cannot stand alone. Thus the welfare of the Filipinos coincides with the dictates of national honour in forbidding our abandonment of the archipelago. We cannot from any point of view escape the responsibilities of government which our sovereignty entails; and the commission is strongly persuaded that the performance of our national duty will prove the greatest blessing to the peoples of the Philippine Islands. [...]

=== Second Philippine Commission ===
The Second Philippine Commission, appointed by President McKinley on March 16, 1900, and headed by William Howard Taft, was granted legislative as well as limited executive powers. On September 1, the Taft Commission began to exercise legislative functions. Between September 1900 and August 1902, it issued 499 laws. The commission established a civil service and a judicial system that included a Supreme Court, and a legal code was drawn up to replace obsolete Spanish ordinances. The 1901 municipal code provided for a new American-sponsored system of local government consisting of popularly elected presidents, vice presidents, and councilors to serve on municipal boards. The municipal board members were responsible for collecting taxes, maintaining municipal properties, and undertaking necessary construction projects; they also elected provincial governors.

=== American opposition ===
Some Americans, notably William Jennings Bryan, Mark Twain, Andrew Carnegie, Ernest Crosby, and other members of the American Anti-Imperialist League, strongly objected to the annexation of the Philippines. Anti-imperialist movements claimed that the United States had become a colonial power.

Some anti-imperialists opposed annexation on racist grounds. Among these was Senator Benjamin Tillman of South Carolina, who feared that annexation of the Philippines would lead to an influx of non-white immigrants into the United States. Others worried that annexing the Philippines would lead to the non-white population having a say in the American government.

As news of atrocities committed in subduing the Philippines arrived in the United States, support for the war flagged.

==== Mark Twain ====
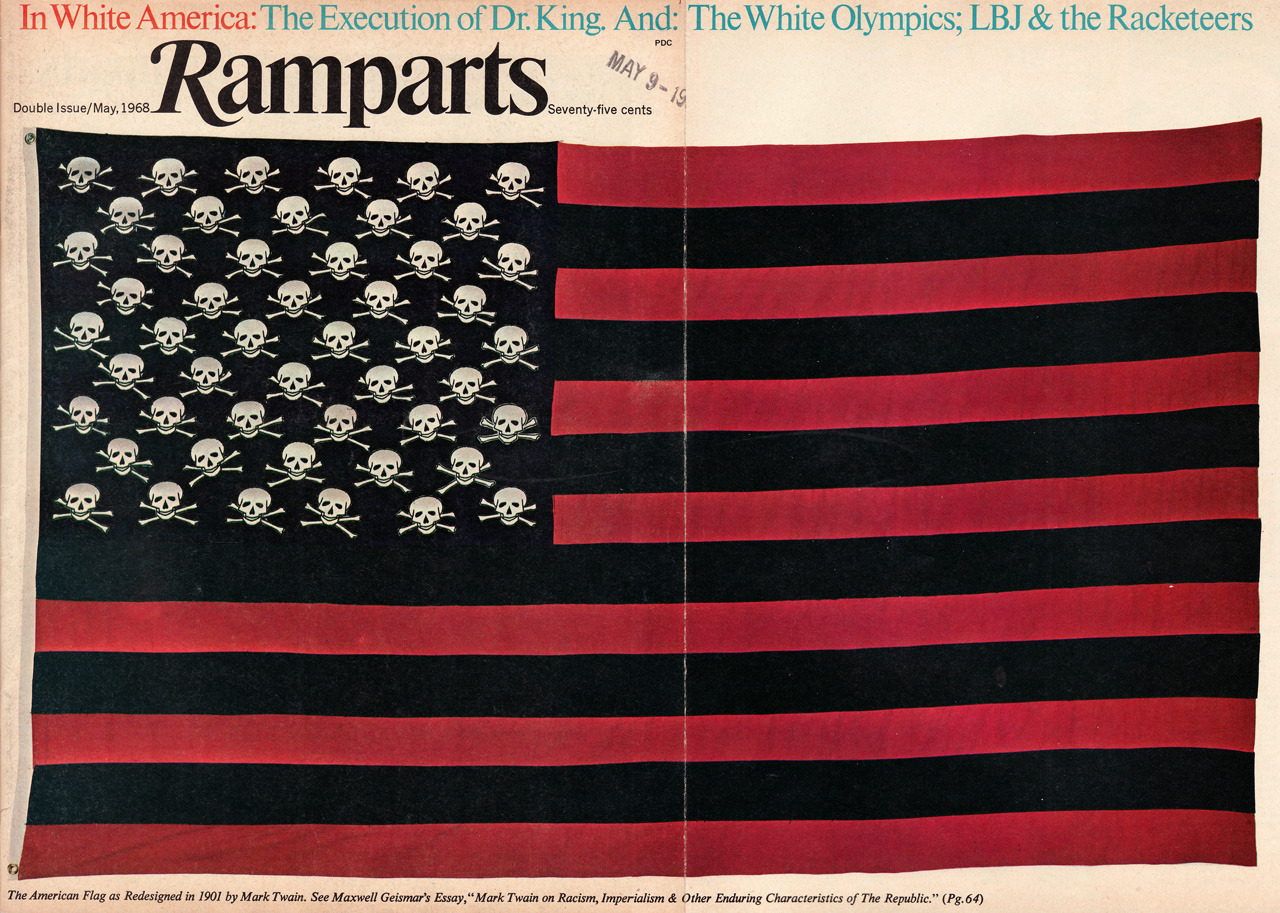
In 1901, Twain wrote a satirical essay titled To the Person Sitting in Darkness, in which he expressed strong anti-imperialist views against certain ongoing conflicts such as the Philippine–American War. At one point, Twain sarcastically described what the flag of an American-controlled Philippines should look like; "And as for a flag for the Philippine Province, it is easily managed. We can have a special one—our States do it: we can have just our usual flag, with the white stripes painted black and the stars replaced by the skull and cross-bones."

Mark Twain opposed the war using his influence in the press. He said the war betrayed the ideals of American democracy by not allowing the Filipino people to choose their own destiny:

There is the case of the Philippines. I have tried hard, and yet I cannot for the life of me comprehend how we got into that mess. Perhaps we could not have avoided it – perhaps it was inevitable that we should come to be fighting the natives of those islands – but I cannot understand it, and have never been able to get at the bottom of the origin of our antagonism to the natives. I thought we should act as their protector – not try to get them under our heel. We were to relieve them from Spanish tyranny to enable them to set up a government of their own, and we were to stand by and see that it got a fair trial. It was not to be a government according to our ideas, but a government that represented the feeling of the majority of the Filipinos, a government according to Filipino ideas. That would have been a worthy mission for the United States. But now – why, we have got into a mess, a quagmire from which each fresh step renders the difficulty of extrication immensely greater. I'm sure I wish I could see what we were getting out of it, and all it means to us as a nation.

In a diary passage, Twain refers to American troops as "our uniformed assassins" and describes their killing of "six hundred helpless and weaponless savages" in the Philippines as "a long and happy picnic with nothing to do but sit in comfort and fire the Golden Rule into those people down there and imagine letters to write home to the admiring families, and pile glory upon glory".

=== Filipino opposition ===
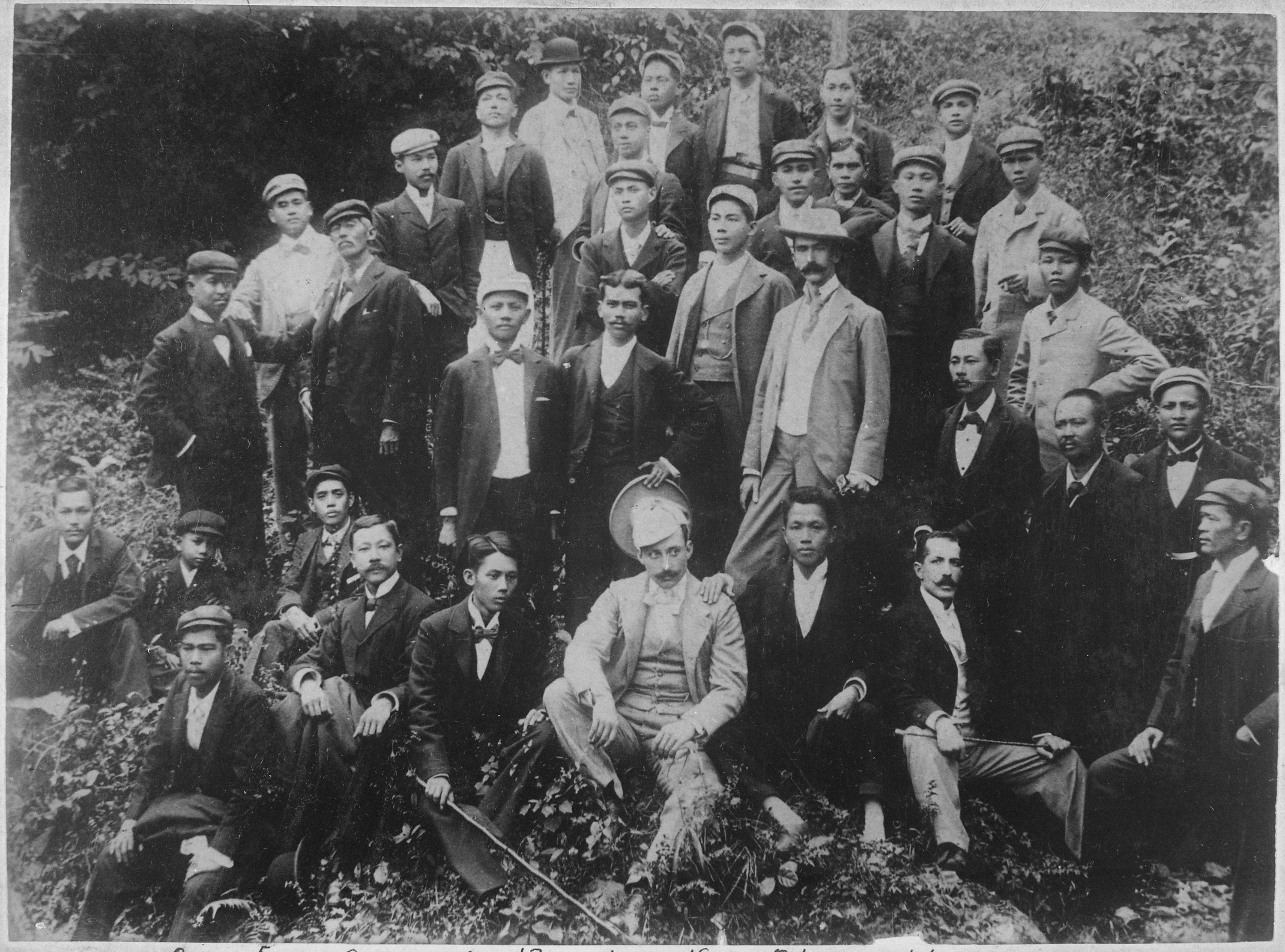
Aguinaldo (seated 3d from right) and other insurgent leaders., c. 1900

Some of Aguinaldo's associates supported America, even before hostilities began. Pedro Paterno, erstwhile head of the cabinet and the author of the 1897 armistice treaty with Spain, advocated the incorporation of the Philippines into the United States in 1898. Other associates sympathetic to the U.S. included Trinidad Pardo de Tavera and Benito Legarda, prominent members of Congress; Gregorio Araneta, Aguinaldo's Secretary of Justice; and Felipe Buencamino, Aguinaldo's Secretary of Foreign Affairs. Buencamino is recorded to have said in 1902: "I am an American and all the money in the Philippines, the air, the light, and the sun I consider American." Many supporters subsequently held posts in the colonial government.

U.S. Army Captain Matthew Arlington Batson formed the Macabebe Scouts as a native guerrilla force to fight the Filipino forces from among a tribe of that name having a history of antipathy with Tagalogs.

== Aftermath ==
=== Postwar conflicts ===
After military rule was terminated on July 4, 1901, the Philippine Constabulary was established as an archipelago-wide police force to control brigandage and deal with the remnants of the Republic. Organized and initially commanded by Brigadier General Henry Tureman Allen, the Philippine Constabulary gradually took responsibility for suppressing hostile forces' activities. Remnants of Aguinaldo's Republic, and remnants or holdovers of the Katipunan organization, which had predated the American presence, and other resistance groups all remained active, fighting for nearly a decade after the official end of the war. After the close of the war, however, Governor General Taft preferred to rely on the Philippine Constabulary and to treat this as a law enforcement concern. Thus the actions of these remaining guerrilla resistance movements were labeled as brigandage or banditry, and dismissed by the American government as bandits, fanatics, and cattle rustlers.

Though most fighting in the Philippines had ceased following Aguinaldo's surrender in April 1901, nationalist forces continued to hold out in some areas, notably in Samar under Lukbán and in Batangas under Malvar. (Note: Some sources assert that Malvar succeeded to the titular presidency of the Philippine Republic after Aguinaldo's capture; he surrendered in April 1902.) Acting under authority of section 3 of the Organic Act, (Note: Section 3 provides, "That the President of the United States, during such time as and whenever the sovereignty and authority of the United States encounter armed resistance in the Philippine Islands, until otherwise provided by Congress, shall continue to regulate and control commercial intercourse with and within said Islands by such general rules and regulations as he, in his discretion, may deem more conducive to the public interests and the general welfare.") President Roosevelt used U.S. military forces to put down these pockets of resistance. The Balangiga massacre on September 28, 1901, triggered a major U.S. pacification operation in Samar. In Batangas, Brigadier General J. Franklin Bell relentlessly pursued Malvar and his men from 1901 through the opening months of 1902, forcing the surrender of many of the Filipino soldiers. Malvar surrendered on April 16, 1902. along with his sick wife and children and some of his officers. By the end of the month, nearly 3,000 of Malvar's men had also surrendered.

In 1902, Macario Sakay established the Republika ng Katagalugan, claiming to succeed the First Philippine Republic, in Morong along Katipunan lines as opposed to Aguinaldo's Republic. This republic ended in 1906 when Sakay and his top followers surrendered based on offer of amnesty from the American authorities. Instead, they were arrested by constabulary forces under Colonel Harry Hill Bandholtz and executed the following year.

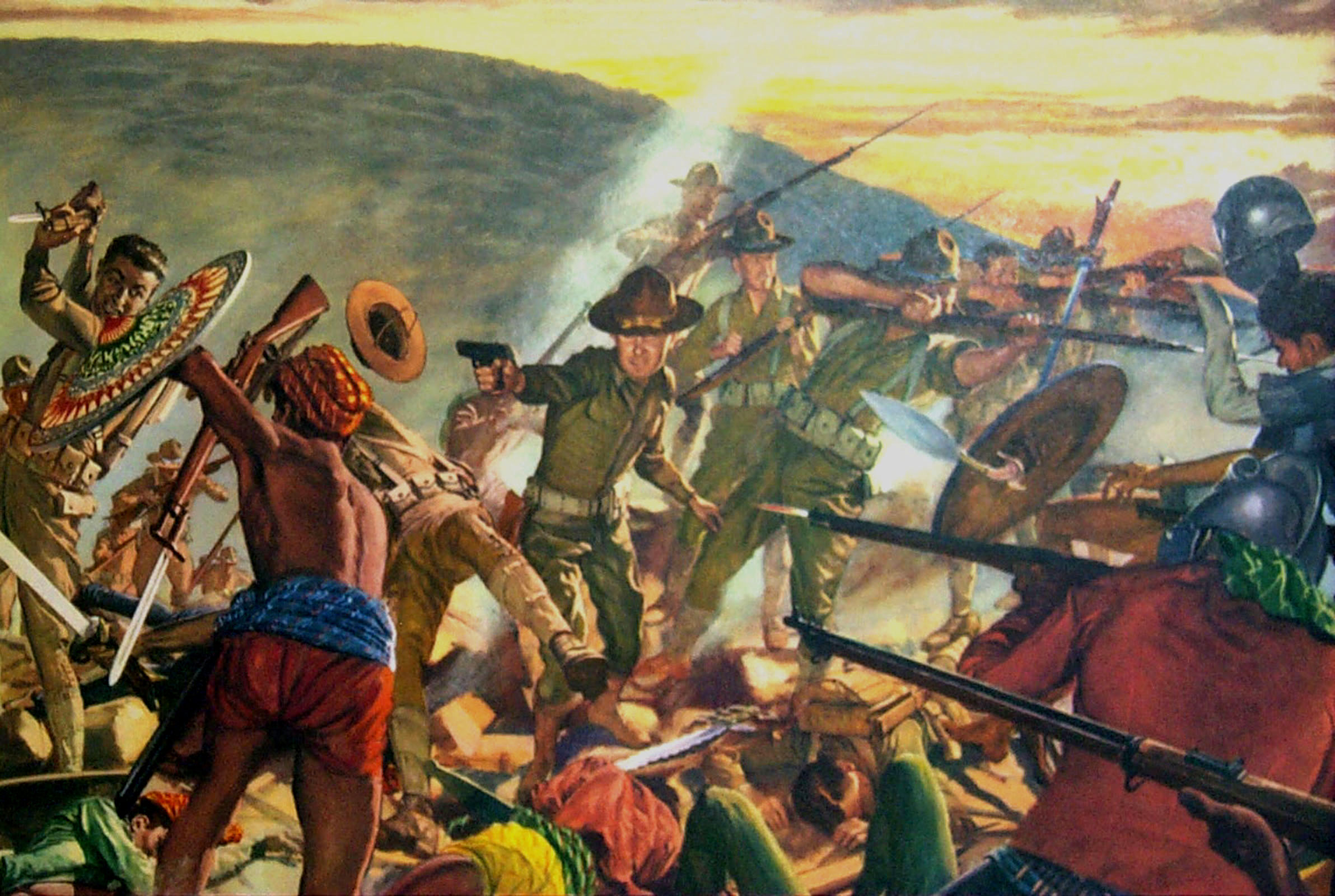
"Knocking Out the Moros": illustration depicting the Battle of Bud Bagsak in June 1913, which ended the Moro Rebellion in Jolo

Beginning in 1903, brigandage by organized groups became a problem in some outlying provinces in the Visayas. Among these groups were the Pulahan (Spanish: Pulajanes), who were from the highlands of Samar and Leyte. The term is derived from the native word pula, meaning "red", as they were distinguished by their red garments. The Pulajanes subscribed to a blend of Catholic and folk beliefs. For example, they believed certain amulets called agimat would render them bulletproof. The last of these groups were defeated or had surrendered to the Philippine Constabulary by 1911.

The American government had signed the Kiram–Bates Treaty with the Sultanate of Sulu at the outbreak of the war, which was supposed to prevent resistance in that part of the Philippines (which included parts of Mindanao, the Sulu Archipelago, Palawan, and Sabah). The treaty, in Tausug and English text, differed in that the Tausug text ratified by the Sultan merely recognized "American supremacy and power" and the English text ratified on the part of the Americans gave the United States the right to occupy the Sultanate. After suppressing the Philippine Republic, the United States began to invade Moro land, which provoked the Moro Rebellion, beginning with the Battle of Bayan in May 1902. The rebellion continued until the Battle of Bud Bagsak in June 1913, in which Moro forces under Datu Amil were defeated by US troops led by Brigadier General John J. Pershing. The battle marked the end of the Moro conflict; negotiations between the US authorities and Sulu Sultanate continued until the latter's dissolution in March 1915.

A 1907 law prohibited the display of flags and other symbols "used during the late insurrection in the Philippine Islands". Some historians consider these unofficial extensions to be part of the war. The postwar the Philippine independence movement was still active, with occasional flare ups of violence.

=== Cultural impact ===
The influence of the Roman Catholic Church was reduced when the secular United States Government disestablished the Church and purchased and redistributed Church lands (the Philippine Republic had disestablished the Church upon its inauguration in January 1899, as well as seized all lands owned by religious orders for redistribution, but could never consummate the policy owing to the war). The land amounted to 170,917 hectares (422,350 acres), for which the Church under Pope Leo XIII asked $12,086,438.11 in March 1903. The purchase was completed on December 22, 1903, at a sale price of $7,239,784.66. The land redistribution program was stipulated in at least three laws: the Philippine Organic Act, the Public Lands Act, and the Friar Lands Act. Section 10 of the Public Lands Act limited purchases to a maximum of 16 hectares for an individual or 1024 hectares for a corporation or like association. Land was also offered for lease to landless farmers, at prices ranging from fifty centavos to one peso and fifty centavos per hectare per annum. Section 28 of the Public Lands Act stipulated that lease contracts ran for a maximum of 25 years, renewable for another 25 years.

In 1901, at least five hundred teachers (365 males and 165 females) arrived from the U.S. aboard the USAT Thomas. The name "Thomasite" was adopted for these teachers, who established the American system of education in the country. Among the assignments given were Albay, Catanduanes, Camarines Norte, Camarines Sur, Sorsogon, and Masbate, which are the present day Bicol Region, which was heavily resistant to American rule. Twenty-seven of the original Thomasites either died of tropical diseases or were murdered by Filipino rebels during their first 20 months of residence. Despite the hardships, the Thomasites persisted, teaching and building learning institutions. They opened the Philippine Normal School (now Philippine Normal University) and the Philippine School of Arts and Trades (PSAT) in 1901 and reopened the Philippine Nautical School, established in 1839 by the Board of Commerce of Manila under Spain. By the end of 1904, primary courses were mostly taught by Filipinos under American supervision.

According to historian Daniel Immerwahr, the first 15 American officers to hold the post of Chief of Staff of the United States Army all served in the Philippine–American War. Some veterans of the war, including Douglas MacArthur, Walter Krueger, Innis P. Swift, and Rapp Brush served as senior commanders in the US campaign to liberate the Philippines from the Empire of Japan during World War II.

==== In the media ====
Multiple Filipino films were based on the war: Virgin Forest (1985), Baler (2008), Amigo (2010), El Presidente (2012), Heneral Luna (2015), and Goyo: The Boy General (2018). The film Sakay portrays the latter part of the life of Filipino revolutionary Macario Sakay. Malvar: Tuloy ang Laban is a biographical film about the life of Miguel Malvar; it has been in development since 2000 and is still pending release.

The 1945 film Los últimos de Filipinas and the 2016 film 1898, Los últimos de Filipinas depict the siege of Baler.

In the U.S., the 1926 film Across the Pacific and the 1949 film Last Stand in the Philippines are about or are set against a background of the war. The 1939 film The Real Glory is set against the backdrop of the Moro Rebellion beginning in 1906.

Media propaganda via film played a large role in the U.S. during the war as well: The 1899 short film Advance of Kansas Volunteers at Caloocan was one such well-known shot, controversially featuring Black Americans as retreating Philippine soldiers in a staged New Jersey short film.

=== Philippine independence and sovereignty (1946) ===
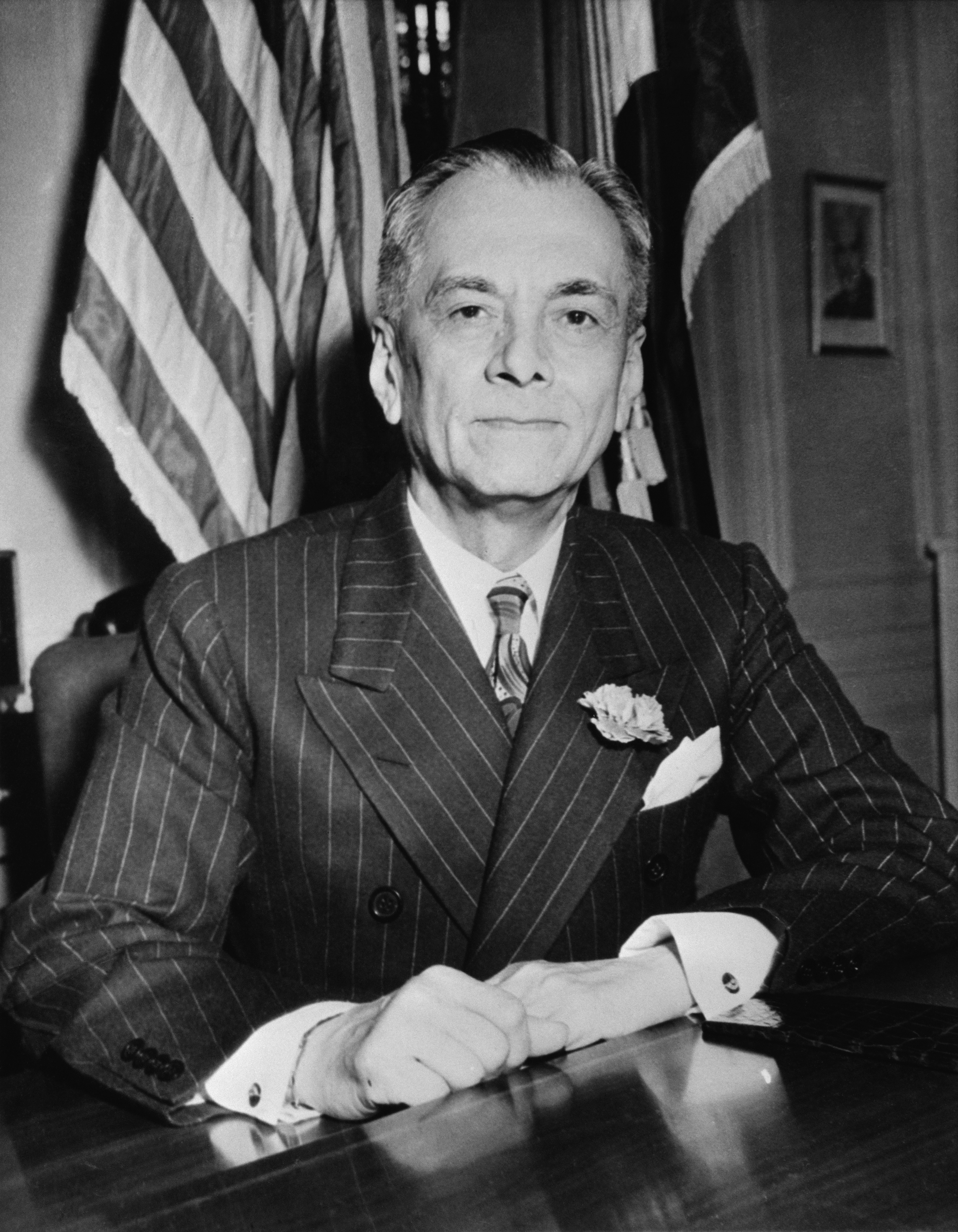
Manuel L. Quezón, the first president of the Commonwealth of the Philippines (from 1935 to 1944) and former commander in the army of the Philippine Republic

From the beginning, United States presidents and their representatives in the islands defined their colonial mission as tutelage: preparing the Philippines for eventual independence. Except for a small group of "retentionists", the issue was not whether the Philippines would be granted self-rule, but when and under what conditions. Political development in the country was further expedited by Filipinos who sought the return of independence by political means. The Philippine Organic Act of July 1902 stipulated that upon the complete suppression of the former Philippine forces, a legislature would be established composed of a popularly elected lower house, the Philippine Assembly, and an upper house consisting of the Philippine Commission, which was to be appointed by the United States president.

The Jones Act, passed by the U.S. Congress in 1916 to serve as the organic law in the Philippines, promised eventual independence and instituted an elected Philippine Senate. The Tydings–McDuffie Act (officially the Philippine Independence Act; Public Law 73–127) approved on March 24, 1934, provided for self-government and for independence after ten years. World War II intervened, bringing the Japanese occupation between 1941 and 1945. In 1946, the Treaty of Manila between the governments of the U.S. and the Republic of the Philippines provided for the recognition of the independence of the Philippines and the relinquishment of American sovereignty over the islands.

== See also ==
- Campaigns of the Philippine–American War
- Foreign interventions by the United States
- Anti-Americanism in the Philippines
- History of the Philippines (1898–1946)
- List of Philippine–American War Medal of Honor recipients
- Philippines–United States relations
- Timeline of the Philippine–American War
- United States involvement in regime change
