= Pacification of Batangas =

- Part of the post-war insurgency phase of the Philippine–American War
Date	1 January–16 April 1902
Location	Batangas, Laguna, and Tayabas, Luzon, Insular Government of the Philippine Islands
Result	American victory

Belligerents
United States	Philippine nationalists

Commanders and leaders
J. Franklin Bell	Miguel Malvar (surrendered)

Units involved
U.S. Volunteers; U.S. Marine Corps	Army of Liberation

Casualties and losses
Unknown	Unknown

The Pacification of Batangas was a counterinsurgency action initiated by Philippine Governor William H. Taft and Brigadier General J. Franklin Bell. General hostilities in the Philippine-American War had largely ceased in April after the capture of Emilio Aguinaldo, President of the insurgent Philippine Republic and his publication of a manifesto on April 19, 1901, acknowledging and accepting U.S. sovereignty throughout the Philippines. Fighting continued in southwestern Luzon by forces commanded by Miguel Malvar. American military forces conducted a counterinsurgency campaign in the area, implementing strict controls on travel, shifting civilians into designated zones, and destroying food supplies, along with increasing military activity in the area. Malvar surrendered in April 1902.

== Nomenclature, organization and mission ==
Batangas, in this context, refers to an area of southwestern Luzon then referred to by the U.S. Army as the Batangas Region and comprising the provinces of Batangas, Laguna, and portions of Tayabas; an area of about 4,200 square miles (11,000 km^{2}) with a resident population of about 560,000. Chaffee assigned Brigadier General James Franklin Bell to command the 3rd Separate Brigade with a mission to pacify that geographic region.

== Filipino insurgent resistance ==
Miguel Malvar had assumed command of Filipino guerilla forces in southwestern Luzon, including the Batangas region. reorganized them, renamed the combined armed forces as "Army of Liberation"" and continued pursuing guerilla warfare.

== Pacification operations ==
After assessing the situation in his new command, Bell concluded in a December 26, 1901 report to his immediate superior, Major General Loyd Wheaton, that it would be necessary to cut off the income and food of the Malvar's guerillas and crowd them mitarily in order to wear them out. (Note: In 1900, MG Wheaton wrote, “You can’t put down a rebellion by throwing confetti and sprinkling perfumery.”) (Note: Bell ha dapplied similar measures on a smaller scale with good results in a previous assignment in Abra province.) Bell had determined that insurgent guerillas were operating from bases in the areas of Mount San Cristobal, Mount Banahaw, Mount Makiling, and the mountains northeast of Lobo and assigned forces to clean up these areas and secure them, impounding or destroying food supplies and enforcing severe travel restrictions. Bell estimated that lack of food and military pressure would bring about effective pacification within two months.

Bell's operations proved effective in Batangas and Laguna, with some guerillas surrendering and some, pursued by Bell's forces, fleeing into the mountains of northern and western Tayabas province. In February, insurrecto activity in parts of the civilian administered and supposedly pacified parts of Tayabas province. In response to this and to observations that insurgents remaining in Laguna have been able to get food supplies from towns in Tayabas, Bell ordered strict application in Tayabas of measures which had been effective in Batangas, cutting insurgents off from income and food. Bell also requested that all ports in Tayabas be closed; he implemented a complete counterinsurgency campaign designed to separate the guerrillas from the population, establishing population reconcentration zones, sendt large expeditions into guerrilla strongholds, broke up town infrastructures, and destroyed food supplies. These measures had their desired effect, and guerrilla resistance collapsed within a few months.

Effective guerrilla resistance was destroyed by April 1902 and insurgent General Malvar surrendered on April 16. Malvar described his reasons for surrendering as:

Lack of food in the field, owing to the concentration in the zone, apart from the increased activity of the American troops; because of the adherence of the towns to the American troops on account of the concentration and measures taken by General Bell . . . .

Malvar's post-capture statement was a testament to the effectiveness of General Bell's counter-insurgency campaign. He listed the following as reasons he eventually capitulated, after a long, grueling resistance:

Because the American forces kept me constantly on the move from the month of February down to the last moment, when I found myself without a single gun or a clerk . . . .

== Bibliography ==
- Ramsey, Robert D. III (2007). A Masterpiece of Counterguerrilla Warfare | BG J. Franklin Bell in the Philippines 1901-1902 (PDF). Fort Leavenworth, Kansas: Combat Studies Institute Press, US Army Combined Arms Center. ISBN 978-0-16-079503-9.
- Miller, Stuart Creighton (1982). "Benevolent Assimilation": The American Conquest of the Philippines, 1899-1903. Yale University Press. ISBN 978-0-300-16193-9.
- Michael, Daniel (December 2017). James Franklin Bell : hard war in the Philippines (Master of Arts in History thesis). Louisville, Kentucky: University of Louisville.
- Bruno, Thomas A. (March 25, 2010). Ending an Insurgency Violently | The Samar and Batangas Punitive Campaigns (PDF) (Report). U.S. Army War College.
