= Leonard B. Cresswell =

U.S. Marine Corps Major General

Leonard Baker Cresswell
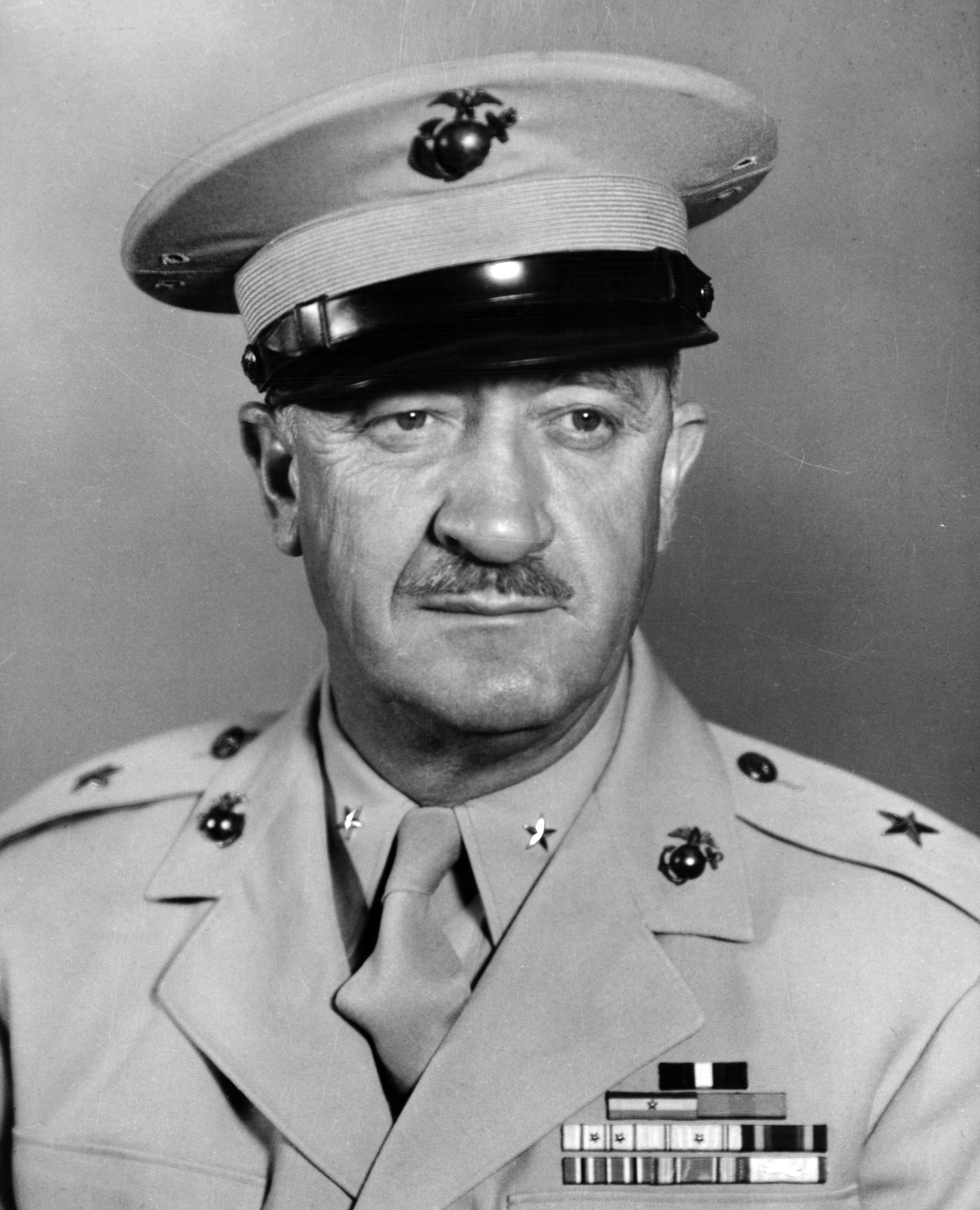
- Cresswell as Brigadier general
- Born: July 18, 1901; Lexington, Mississippi, US
- Died: April 25, 1966 (aged 64); Annapolis, Maryland, US
- Burial place: Arlington National Cemetery
- Relatives: RADM Reginald R. Belknap (father-in-law)
- Military career
- Allegiance: United States of America
- Branch: United States Marine Corps
- Service years: 1924–1956
- Rank: Major general
- Service number: 0-3940
- Commands: Troop Training Unit, Atlantic; Marine Barracks, Washington, D.C. 23rd Marine Regiment; 1st Battalion, 1st Marines
- Conflicts: Yangtze Patrol; World War II: Battle of Guadalcanal; Battle of the Tenaru
- Awards: Navy Cross

Leonard Baker Cresswell (July 18, 1901 – April 25, 1966) was a highly decorated officer of the United States Marine Corps with the rank of major general. He is most noted for his service as commanding officer of 1st Battalion, 1st Marines during Guadalcanal Campaign. Cresswell later served as commanding general of Troop Training Unit, Atlantic Fleet and completed his career as Director of the Staff of the Inter-American Defense Board.

== Early career ==
Leonard B. Cresswell was born on July 18, 1901, in Lexington, Mississippi, and attended high school in Oxford, Mississippi, before he was transferred to Tupelo Military Institute. He graduated from the institute in summer of 1919 and subsequently enrolled the Mississippi State University in Starkville, Mississippi. Cresswell graduated with bachelor's degree in summer 1924.

Cresswell was commissioned as second lieutenant in the Marine Corps on June 21, 1924, and ordered to the Basic School at Philadelphia Navy Yard for officer's training. He completed the school in June of the following year and was attached to Marine Corps Schools, Quantico as an instructor in Infantry Weapons School. Cresswell remained in that capacity until November of that year and then was ordered to the Marine Barrack at Norfolk Navy Yard, where served until November 1926. While there, he met his future wife, Emilia Field Belknap, daughter of Norfolk Yard Commandant, Captain Reginald R. Belknap. They were married on June 1, 1927, in Christ Church in Norfolk, Virginia.

He was subsequently attached to the Marine detachment aboard the battleship USS Pennsylvania, where he served until April 1928. Cresswell was then attached to the 4th Marine Regiment at Quantico and sailed for expeditionary duty to China in May 1929. He served three years with guard duties at Shanghai International Settlement and returned to the United States in July 1932.

Upon his return, Cresswell served with the Marine barracks at Brooklyn Navy Yard until May 1933, when he was ordered for Senior Course back to the Marine Corps Schools, Quantico. He then served as an instructor at the Basic School at Philadelphia Navy Yard until May 1939, when he was appointed commanding officer of the Marine detachment aboard the battleship USS Maryland. Cresswell was stationed at Hawaii and took part in the several patrol cruises along the West Coast.

== World War II ==
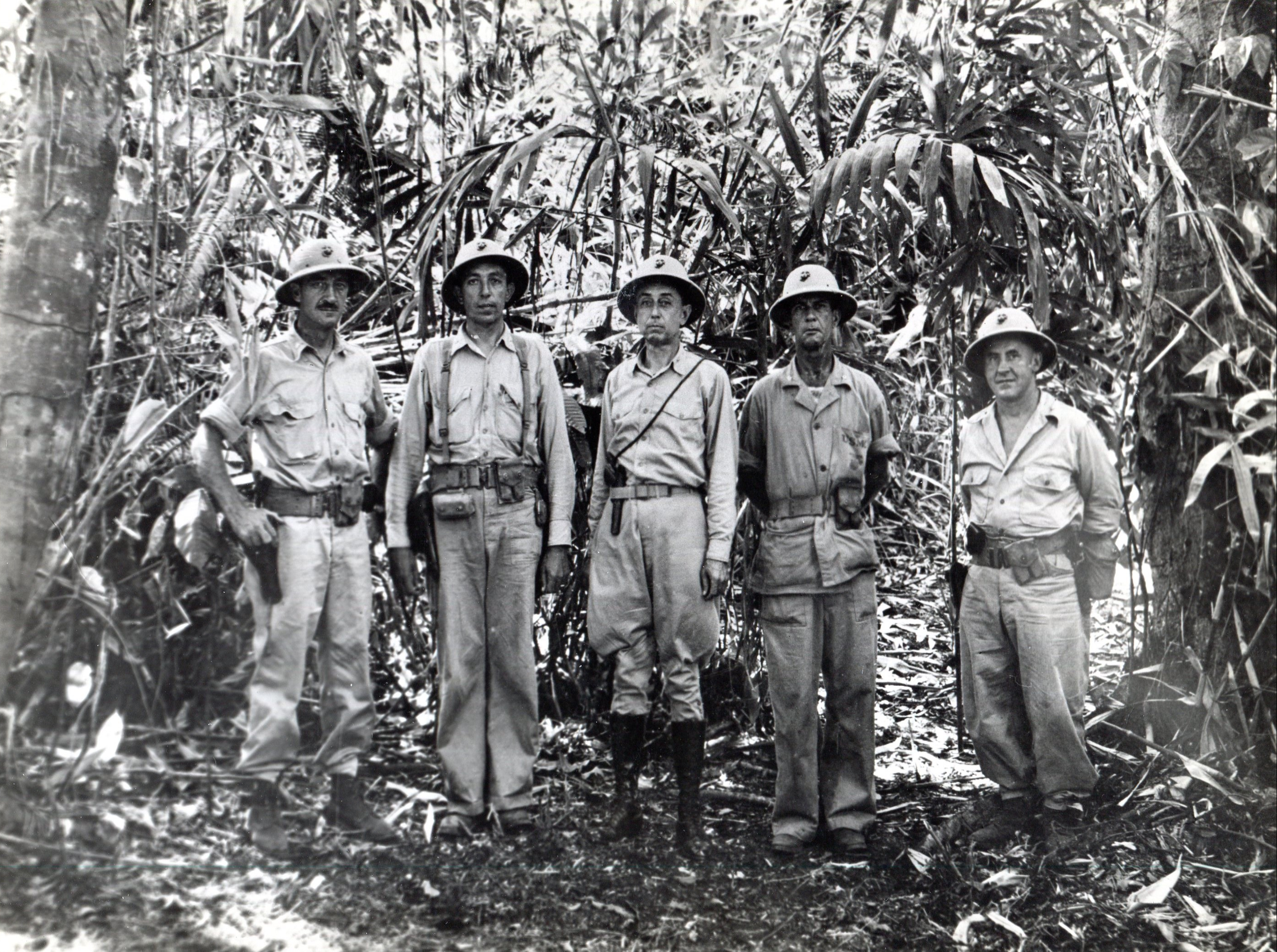
From left to right: Lieutenant Colonel Leonard B. Cresswell (1st Battalion), Lieutenant Colonel Edwin A. Pollock (Executive Officer 1st Marines), Colonel Clifton B. Cates (Commanding Officer 1st Marines), Lieutenant Colonel William N. McKelvy (3rd Battalion) and Lieutenant Colonel William W. Stickney (2nd Battalion) on Guadalcanal, October 1942

At the beginning of July 1941, Cresswell was promoted to the rank of major and transferred to the staff of 1st Marine Division as adjutant to commanding general, Philip H. Torrey. Following the Japanese attack on Pearl Harbor in December 1941, division began with the preparation for deployment to South Pacific and got the new division commander, Major General Alexander Vandegrift in March 1942.

Cresswell was subsequently promoted to the temporary rank of lieutenant colonel and appointed commanding officer of 1st Battalion, 1st Marines under Colonel Clifton B. Cates. The 1st Marine Division deployed to South Pacific in June 1942 and remained on New Zealand for few weeks, before moved to Koro Island, Fiji to rehearse for Guadalcanal Operation.

The 1st Marines landed on Guadalcanal on August 7, 1942, and captured nearby airfield during the first day. During the night on August 21, Japanese troops launched a counteroffensive and attacked 2nd Battalion positions between Ilu and Tenaru rivers. Although dense jungle and difficult terrain made it impossible for the tanks assigned to his command to effect a crossing of the river, Lieutenant Colonel Cresswell advanced with his battalion to the other side of the Tenaru and, by the skillful disposal of his men over a large area, attacked the rear of enemy's regiment, succeeded in annihilating the Japanese force between the Ilu and the Tenaru Rivers with a minimum loss to his unit. The Japanese lost almost 770 soldiers killed in action as they attempted to cross the Tenaru River to gain control of the vital Henderson Airfield. Cresswell was decorated with the Navy Cross for his service on Tenaru.

First Marine Division was ordered to Australia for rest and refit in December 1942, and Cresswell was appointed executive officer of 5th Marine Regiment under Colonel John T. Selden in January 1943. His tour of duty in the Pacific ended in September of that year, when he was ordered back to the United States. His old superior, Clifton B. Cates, who was meanwhile promoted to the rank of brigadier general and now served as commandant of the Marine Corps Schools Quantico, requested for Cresswell to be attached to his staff.

Cresswell was subsequently appointed commander of the Reserve Officers School, which trained and sent to combat duty all newly commissioned Marine Corps Reserve officers. He served in that capacity until January 1945, when he was appointed commander of Platoon Leaders School. Cresswell also took part in the training of officers of the Royal Netherlands Marine Brigade and received Dutch Order of Orange-Nassau, rank Commander.

In May 1945, Cresswell returned to the Pacific Area and assumed command of 23rd Marine Regiment, 4th Marine Division again under General Clifton B. Cates. However regiment did not see combat anymore and Cresswell served on Maui, Hawaii until the end of war. During October 1945, 23rd Marines relocated to Camp Pendleton, where they were disbanded during the following month.

== Later career ==
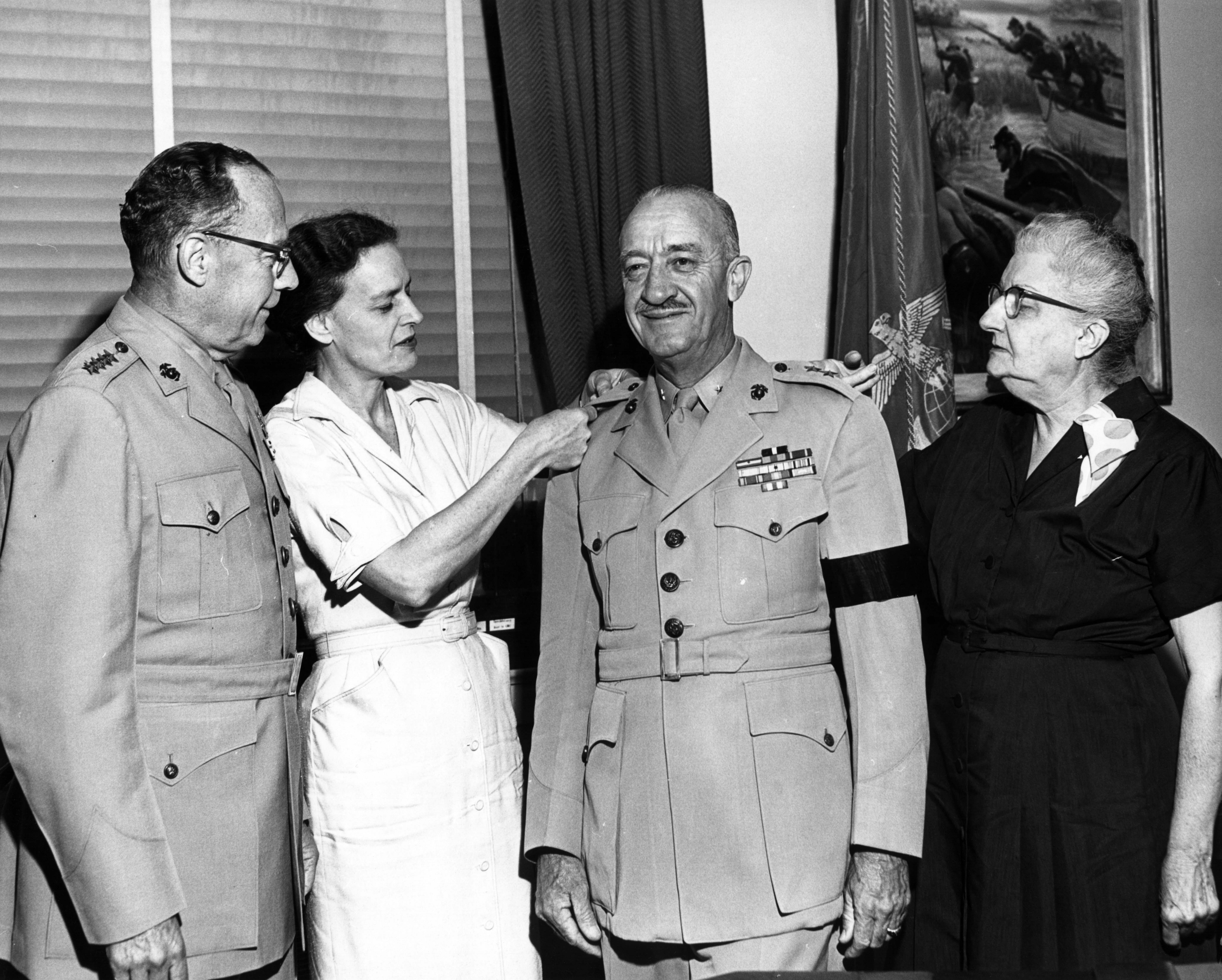
Leonard B. Cresswell being promoted to major general on June 29, 1956, during his retirement ceremony. Also present Commandant of the Marine Corps Randolph M. Pate, wife Emilia and sister May Cresswell, Washington D.C.

Cresswell was subsequently ordered to Guam and appointed planning and ground forces operations officer on the staff of the commander, Marianas, U. S. Pacific Fleet. He returned to the United States in August 1947 and assumed duty as commanding officer of Marine Barracks, Washington, D.C. and director of Marine Corps Institute. He left Washington in July 1949 in order to attend the Senior Course at Naval War College in Newport, Rhode Island.

Following his graduation in July 1950, Cresswell was transferred to Camp Lejeune and appointed chief of staff, 2nd Marine Division under Major General Ray A. Robinson. However, the division did not go overseas and remained at Camp Lejeune as combat readiness force. Cresswell was promoted to the rank of brigadier general in July 1951 and appointed 2nd Division assistant commander under his old friend from Guadalcanal, Edwin A. Pollock.

During this time he was given temporary additional duty in command of a joint air-ground brigade which he organized and with which he executed a training maneuver of two months duration in the West Indies Area, culminating in a full-scale amphibious assault on the Onslow Beach Area.

Cresswell was detached from 2nd Marine Division in June 1952 and ordered to Naval Station Norfolk for duty as commanding general of Troop Training Unit, Atlantic Fleet. He participated in the amphibious training of personnel from all branches of the United States Military until July 1954. Cresswell was then ordered to Washington, where he succeeded Brigadier General William S. Fellers as Director of the Staff of the Inter-American Defense Board. In this capacity, he took part in the development of collaborative approaches on common defense and security issues facing countries in North, Central, and South America.

He retired from the Marine Corps on June 30, 1956, after 32 years of active service and was advanced to the rank of major general for having been specially commended in combat. Major General Leonard B. Cresswell died on April 25, 1966, in Annapolis, Maryland, and was buried with full military honors at Arlington National Cemetery, Virginia. The housing building at his Alma mater, Mississippi State University was named in his honor – Cresswell Hall.

== Decorations ==
This is the ribbon bar of Major General Leonard B. Cresswell:

1st Row	Navy Cross		Navy Presidential Unit Citation with one star
2nd Row	Marine Corps Expeditionary Medal	Yangtze Service Medal	American Defense Service Medal
3rd Row	American Campaign Medal	Asiatic-Pacific Campaign Medal with two 3/16" service stars	World War II Victory Medal
4th Row	National Defense Service Medal	Dutch Order of Orange-Nassau, rank Commander	Inter-American Defense Board Medal

=== Navy Cross citation ===
Citation:

The President of the United States of America takes pleasure in presenting the Navy Cross to Lieutenant Colonel Leonard B. Cresswell (MCSN: 0-3940), United States Marine Corps Reserve, for extraordinary heroism and distinguished service as Commanding Officer of the First Battalion, First Marines, FIRST Marine Division, during action against enemy Japanese forces in the Tenaru Sector, Guadalcanal, Solomon Islands, on the night of 21 August 1942. Although dense jungle and difficult terrain made it impossible for the tanks assigned to his command to effect a crossing of the river, Lieutenant Colonel Cresswell advanced with his Battalion to the other side of the Tenaru and, by the skillful disposal of his men over a large area, succeeded in annihilating the Japanese force between the Ilu and the Tenaru Rivers with a minimum loss to his unit. His brilliant leadership and fine tactical judgment were decisive factors in the accomplishment of a vital mission and reflect the highest credit upon Lieutenant Colonel Cresswell and the United States Naval Service.

== See also ==
- Guadalcanal Campaign

Military offices
Preceded by George F. Good Jr.	Commanding General of the Troop Training Unit, Atlantic; June 1952 - July 1954	Succeeded by Matthew C. Horner
Preceded by Edward J. Dillon	Commanding Officer of the 23rd Marine Regiment; May 3, 1945 - November 15, 1945	Succeeded by Unit Deactivated
