= James P. Berkeley =

U.S. Marine Corps Lieutenant General

James Phillips Berkeley
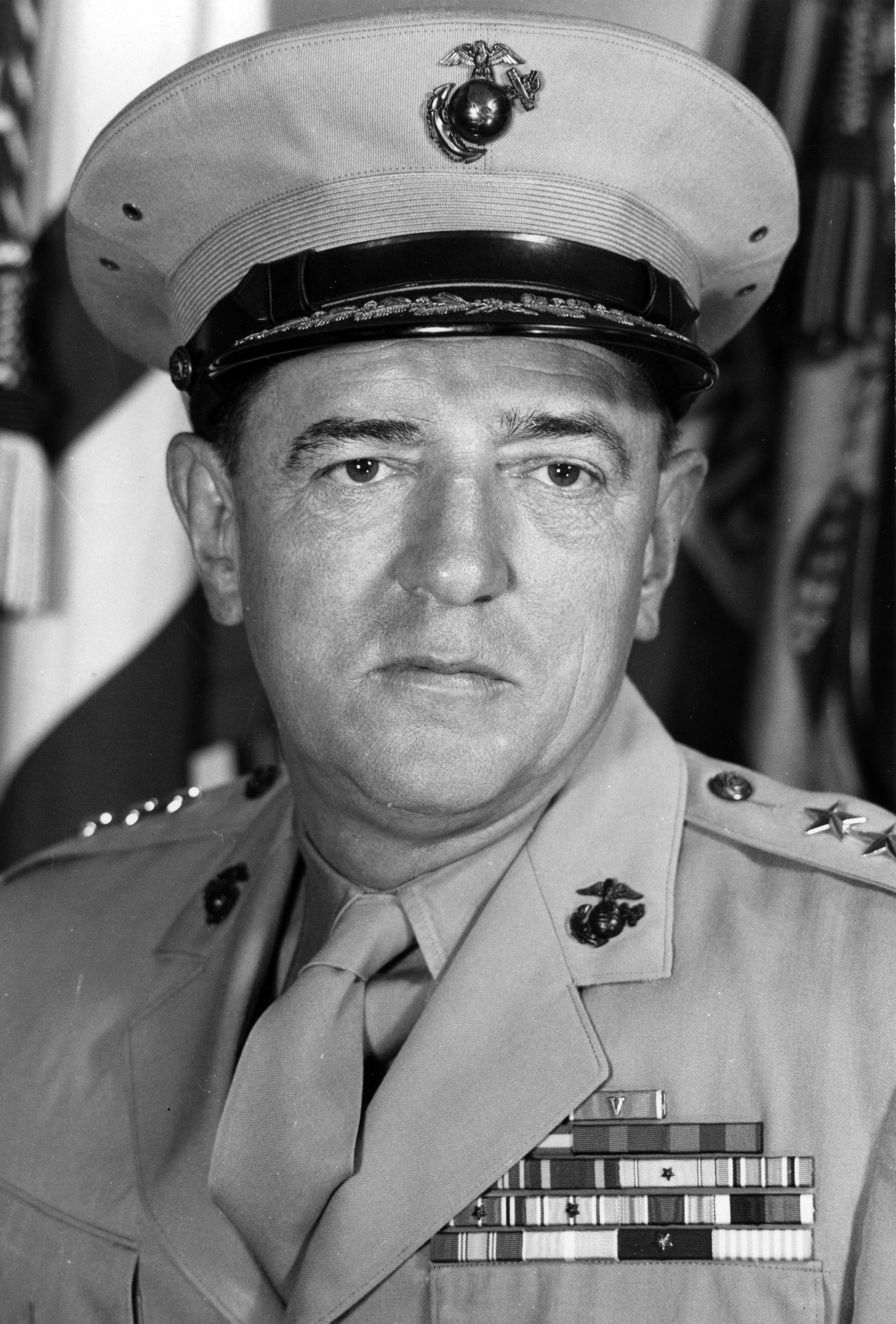
- Lieutenant General James P. Berkeley
- Born: July 1, 1907; Portsmouth, Virginia, U.S.
- Died: February 13, 1995 (aged 87); Virginia Beach, Virginia, U.S.
- Relatives: Major General Randolph C. Berkeley - (Father) Carrie Anna Phillips [1884-1907] - (Mother)
- Military career
- Allegiance: United States
- Branch: United States Marine Corps
- Service years: 1927–1965
- Rank: Lieutenant General
- Nickname: "Phil"
- Service number: 0–4488
- Commands: Fleet Marine Force, Atlantic; Camp Lejeune; 2nd Marine Division; Department of the Pacific
- Conflicts: Banana Wars; Nicaraguan Campaign; Yangtze Patrol; World War II; Operation Avalanche; Battle of Iwo Jima; Korean War
- Awards: Navy Distinguished Service Medal; Legion of Merit

James Phillips Berkeley (July 1, 1907 – February 13, 1995) was an officer of the United States Marine Corps who attained the rank of lieutenant general. He is most noted as Signal Officer of 5th Marine Division during the Battle of Iwo Jima and later as commanding general of Fleet Marine Force, Atlantic. He was the son of Medal of Honor recipient, Major General Randolph C. Berkeley.

== Early life and career ==
Berkeley was born on July 1, 1907, at Quarters M-7, Marine Barracks within Navy Yard at Portsmouth, Virginia, where his father, Captain Randolph C. Berkeley, was stationed as commander of the Marine detachment aboard the battleship USS Kentucky. His father later received the Medal of Honor during Veracruz Expedition and retired with the rank of major general in the Marine Corps in 1939.

Berkeley's mother, Carrie Anna Phillips, died during his birth and, because of his father's occupation, James was entrusted to the care of his grandfather, who served with the Navy Pay Corps. James rejoined his father in 1923 and after, attending of public school in Shepherdstown, West Virginia, he was sent to the Severn Preparatory school, a preparatory school for the United States Naval Academy.

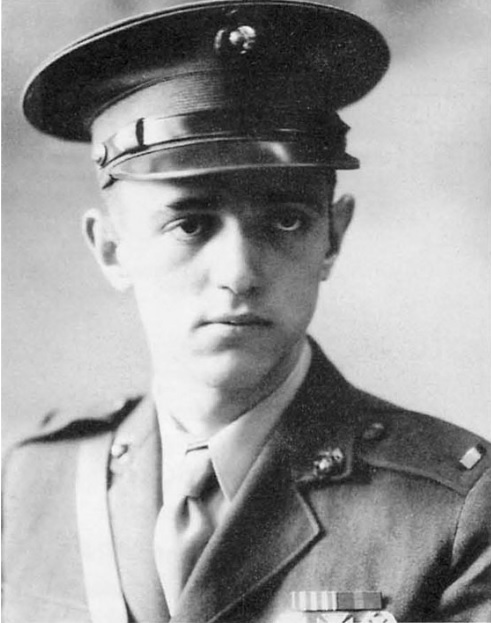
James P. Berkeley as second lieutenant in April 1931

When Berkeley failed the entrance examination to the Naval Academy, his father gave him a choice: go to work or join the Marine Corps as an enlisted man. He chose the Marine Corps and enlisted as a private on March 1, 1927. Private Berkeley was subsequently sent for the recruit training at Marine Corps Recruit Depot Parris Island, South Carolina. After completing training, he was attached to the 2nd Marine Brigade under Brigadier General Logan Feland and sailed for Nicaragua in January 1928.

Berkeley took part in skirmishes with the Sandino rebels in the north of country and quickly received promotion to corporal. Berkeley was subsequently recommended for promotion to sergeant due to his leadership skills, but his father, who served as 2nd Brigade's Chief of Staff, blocked the promotion, saying his son was too young. James Berkeley later used this story to prove that his father's influence had not helped him in his military career. He was decorated for bravery with the Presidential Medal of Merit by the Government of Nicaragua.

Upon his return to the United States in December 1928, Berkeley continued serving and was later promoted to sergeant. Berkeley was also a Distinguished Marksman and received the Marine Corps Good Conduct Medal for his exemplary service.

After three years as a non-commissioned officer, Berkeley was commissioned a second lieutenant on January 31, 1930. Berkeley was subsequently appointed company officer and ordered to the Basic School at Philadelphia Navy Yard for officers' training during the summer of that year. He graduated in June 1931 and served for a brief period with the Marine barracks at Norfolk Navy Yard.

Berkeley was subsequently attached to the 4th Marine Regiment and left with it for China in April 1932. He was subsequently stationed in Beiping with the Marine detachment at the American embassy and then served in the 38th Company under Captain John W. Thomason. While in this capacity, he served as acting communications officer, the branch which significantly influenced him in his later career.

Berkeley returned stateside in December 1934 just for Christmas. After brief leave, Berkeley was assigned to the 2nd Battalion, 6th Marines under Lieutenant Colonel Thomas E. Watson at San Diego, California. He was appointed Battalion Communications Officer and for this new duty, he was promoted to first lieutenant in February 1935.

Berkeley was subsequently transferred to Marine Corps Base Quantico, Virginia, in May 1935 and attached to the staff of 1st Marine Brigade under Brigadier General James J. Meade. Berkeley commanded the brigade's communications platoon until August 1936, then was sent to the Army Signal School at Fort Monmouth, New Jersey. Following his graduation in June 1937, Berkeley rejoined the 1st Marine Brigade and was promoted to the rank of captain in September of that year. He subsequently served as commander of the communications platoon and from April 1938 as brigade communications officer. He left the 1st Brigade in March 1939 and assumed command of the Marine detachment aboard the heavy cruiser USS Wichita. Berkeley spent the next two years on sea duty and took part in her shakedown cruise, during which she visited the Virgin Islands, Cuba, and the Bahamas, before she returned to Philadelphia for post-shakedown repairs. Berkeley participated in the Neutrality Patrol and later also in a goodwill cruise to South America.

== World War II ==
At the beginning of June 1941, Berkeley traveled to Marine Corps Base Quantico, where he was appointed communications officer under Major General Louis M. Little. After the Japanese attack on Pearl Harbor, Berkeley was promoted to the rank of major in January 1942 and subsequently transferred to Headquarters Marine Corps in Washington, D.C., in March of that year. He served as Assistant Officer in Charge of the Communications Section within Division of Plans and Policies under Brigadier General Keller E. Rockey. He was later promoted to lieutenant colonel in August 1942.

In this capacity, Berkeley had the opportunity to accompany the Commandant, Thomas Holcomb on an inspection tour at Guadalcanal during October and November 1942. Later, another inspection tour occurred in August 1943, when he accompanied Lieutenant Colonel Harold O. Deakin and John W. Scott Jr. on a secret mission to London, England and then to the North African theater.

Berkeley took part in Salerno Landing in September 1943 as an observer with the 46th British Infantry Division under Major General John Hawkesworth. During the landing, his LVT came under German artillery fire and was forced to withdraw for repairs. Berkeley later had the opportunity to discuss the efficiency of naval gunfire support with Lieutenant General George S. Patton, the 7th U.S. Army commander. He later recalled General Patton's distaste for and distrust of naval gunfire support, a primary element for successful amphibious operations.

Berkeley returned stateside at the beginning of November 1943 and assumed command of the Field Signal Battalion at Camp Pendleton, California. His unit was later incorporated into the newly activated 5th Marine Division and he was appointed Divisional Signal Officer in February 1944. Berkeley served under his old superior from Washington, D.C., Major General Keller E. Rockey, and was tasked with the organization of 5th Division Signal operation. Thanks to Berkeley's knowledge and experiences in the field of communications, Signal Troops of 5th Marine Division became an effective combat force. This fact was later confirmed during the Iwo Jima campaign.

After a few months of division training and preparation, Berkeley finally sailed to the Pacific area in August 1944. He spent several months of further training in Hawaii, before his division took part in the Battle of Iwo Jima in February 1945. Berkeley went directly to the front lines, when he was assigned to the 27th Marine Regiment under Colonel Thomas A. Wornham. The regiment was in an area of fierce fighting and its executive officer, Colonel Louis C. Plain, was wounded and evacuated. Berkeley assumed temporarily his duties on March 15, 1945, and "coordinated the functioning of a staff badly displaced by casualties, he, without regard for his own personal safety, immediately visited the front line to familiarize himself thoroughly with the situation. Thereafter his clear thinking, sound vision, and tactical judgment based on information collected in numerous visits to the front line observation posts greatly aided the successful accomplishments of the missions assigned the regiment."

Following the battle, Berkeley returned to command the 5th Division Signal Troops and subsequently was decorated with the Legion of Merit with Combat "V" for bravery in action and received the Navy Presidential Unit Citation.

== Later career ==
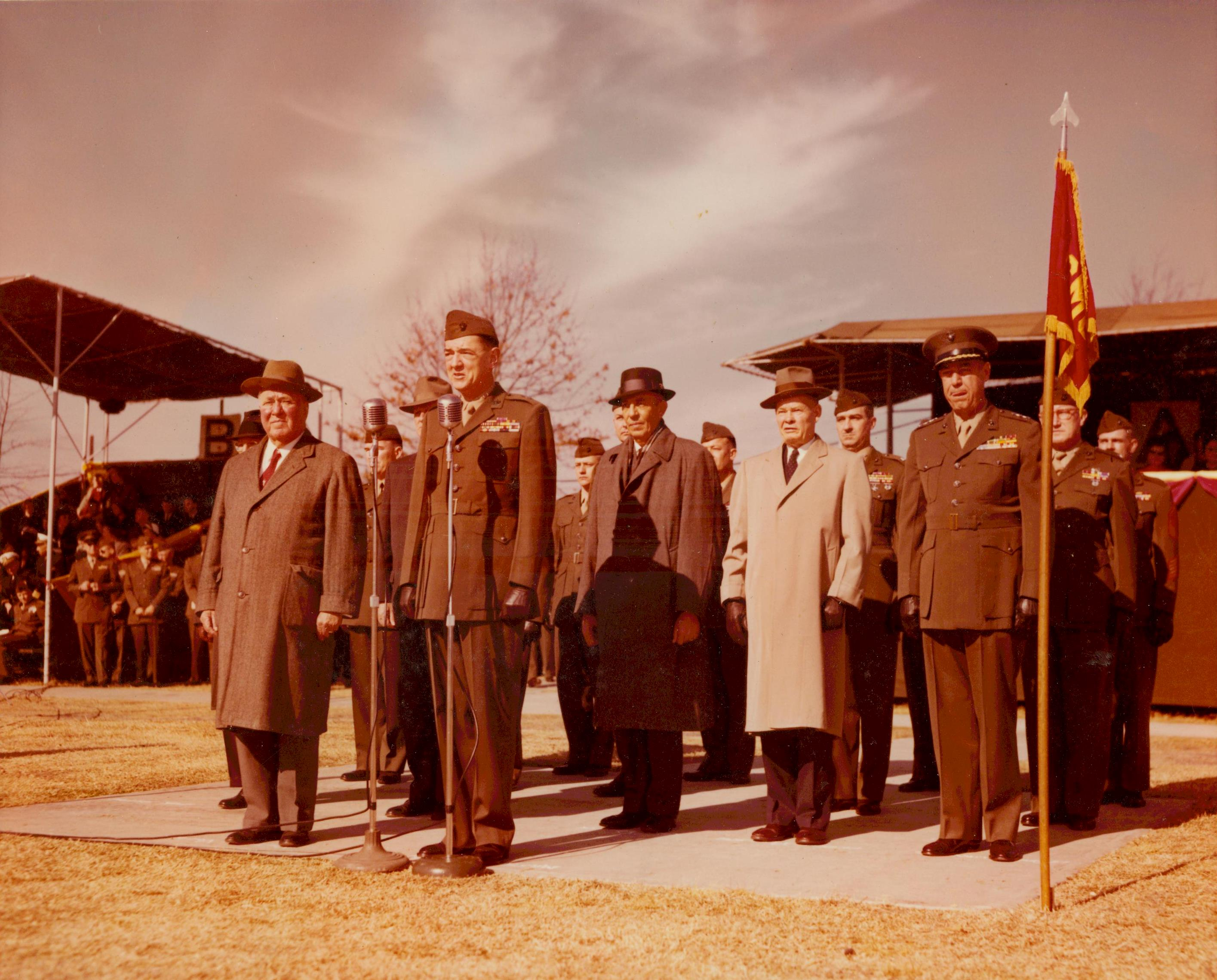
20th Anniversary of 2nd Marine Division at Camp Lejeune, 1961; Commanding general MG James P. Berkeley giving a speech. Former divisional commander, MG Clayton B. Vogel ret. next to him, GEN Edwin A. Pollock ret., LTG Lewis B. Puller ret. and LTG Joseph C. Burger in the background.

Berkeley was transferred as Corps Signal Officer to the staff of the V Amphibious Corps under Lieutenant General Harry Schmidt in July 1945 and took part in the Occupation of Japan. He also received promotion to the rank of colonel in August 1945. While in Japan, Berkeley was appointed officer in charge of the disposition of enemy material in October 1945, but remained in this capacity only until the end of January 1946, when he relieved Colonel Jack P. Juhan as commanding officer of the 6th Marine Regiment.

Upon his return to the United States at the beginning of April 1946, Berkeley was appointed assistant to the Navy Secretary of the Joint Army-Navy Secretariat within the Office of Secretary of the Navy in Washington, D.C., under James Forrestal. He was tasked with the review of any paper requiring joint action sent to the Secretary of the Navy. At the end of January 1947, he was transferred to Buenos Aires, Argentina. Berkeley was appointed an advisor to the Argentina Marine Corps and to the Argentina Naval War College. He also helped with the reorganization of the Argentina Marine Corps.

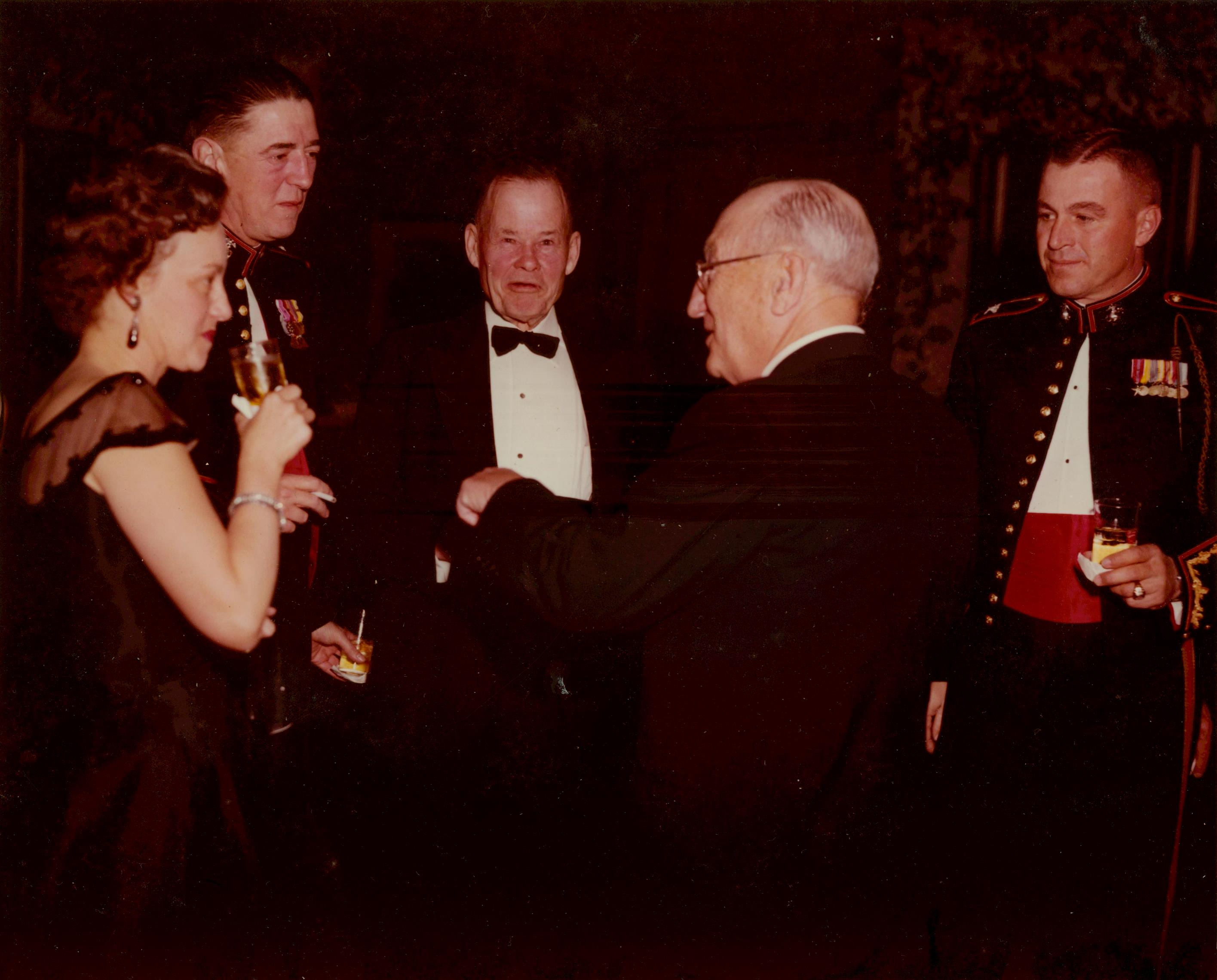
20th Anniversary of 2nd Marine Division at Camp Lejeune, 1961; Commanding general MG James P. Berkeley in conversation with LTG Lewis B. Puller ret. and LTG Julian C. Smith ret.

Colonel Berkeley spent next two years in South America and finally returned stateside in May 1949. He was briefly attached to the Troop Training Unit, Atlantic at Little Creek, Virginia, before he was sent for the senior course at Armed Forces Staff College at Norfolk, Virginia.

Berkeley graduated from the course in January 1950 and subsequently assumed duties at the Naval War College in Newport, Rhode Island. Berkeley served initially as a regular staff member of the Department of Strategy and Tactics, but later was promoted to assistant head of department and then to head of the department. He was also co-responsible for the preparing of the first-ever Command and Staff course at the junior level for lieutenant commanders and majors.

Berkeley's next assignment came in May 1953, when he assumed duties as commanding officer of the Marine Barracks, Washington, D.C., and concurrently of the Marine Corps Institute. The Marines under his command also served as the guard unit for Camp David, the country retreat of the President of the United States, Dwight D. Eisenhower.

Berkeley left for Korea in June 1954 and subsequently assumed duties as chief of staff, 1st Marine Division under Major General Robert E. Hogaboom. It was too late to see combat, because truce was already in effect. He spent next several months with the defense of the Korean Demilitarized Zone until his division was ordered stateside in March 1955. Berkeley was stationed at Camp Pendleton, when he reached the rank of brigadier general on July 1, 1955.

For his new assignment, Berkeley was transferred to Headquarters Marine Corps in Washington, D.C., and appointed assistant chief of staff for personnel. The billet of Sergeant Major of the Marine Corps was created under his command. He received his second star, when he was promoted to the rank of major general in July 1958.

Afterwards, Berkeley succeeded George F. Good Jr. as commanding general of Department of the Pacific at San Francisco. Under his command, the Department of the Pacific was deactivated and Berkeley was transferred to Camp Lejeune at the beginning of November 1959 to assume command of the 2nd Marine Division. He also commanded Camp Lejeune from November 1961 to July 1963.

The pinnacle of his career came at the beginning of August 1963, when Berkeley was promoted to the rank of lieutenant general and appointed Commanding General Fleet Marine Force, Atlantic, with headquarters at Norfolk, Virginia. In October 1963, Berkeley traveled to Spain in order to arrange joint U.S./Spanish amphibious landing exercise. He got the agreement of the Spanish Navy Marines Commandant and began the planning, together with Vice Admiral John S. McCain Jr., Commander Amphibious Forces, U.S. Atlantic Fleet.

The landing exercise was named Operation Steel Pike and took place during October and November 1964. It was the largest peacetime amphibious landing exercise in history, conducted by the United States Navy and Marine Corps. Berkeley commanded the ground units. As one of his last tasks, he oversaw deployment of Marine forces during the Dominican Civil War.

Berkeley retired from the Marine Corps on July 1, 1965, after more than 38 years of active service. For his service during Operation Steel Pike, he was decorated with the Navy Distinguished Service Medal at his retirement ceremony.

== Decorations ==
Here is the ribbon bar of Lieutenant General James P. Berkeley:

1st Row	Navy Distinguished Service Medal			
2nd Row	Legion of Merit with Combat "V"	Navy Presidential Unit Citation	Marine Corps Good Conduct Medal	Marine Corps Expeditionary Medal
3rd Row	Second Nicaraguan Campaign Medal	Yangtze Service Medal	American Defense Service Medal with Fleet Clasp	American Campaign Medal
4th Row	European–African–Middle Eastern Campaign Medal with one 3/16 inch service star	Asiatic-Pacific Campaign Medal with one 3/16 inch service star	World War II Victory Medal	Navy Occupation Service Medal
5th Row	National Defense Service Medal with one star	Korean Service Medal	Nicaraguan Presidential Medal of Merit with star	United Nations Korea Medal

Military offices
Preceded by Robert B. Luckey	Commanding General of Fleet Marine Force, Atlantic; 1963–1965	Succeeded by Alpha L. Bowser
Preceded by Odell M. Conoley	Commanding General of 2nd Marine Division; 1959–1961	Succeeded by Frederick L. Wieseman
Preceded by George F. Good Jr.	Commanding General of Department of the Pacific; 1958–1959	Succeeded by Francis M. McAlister
