= Edwin A. Pollock =

U.S. Marine Corps General

Edwin Allen Pollock
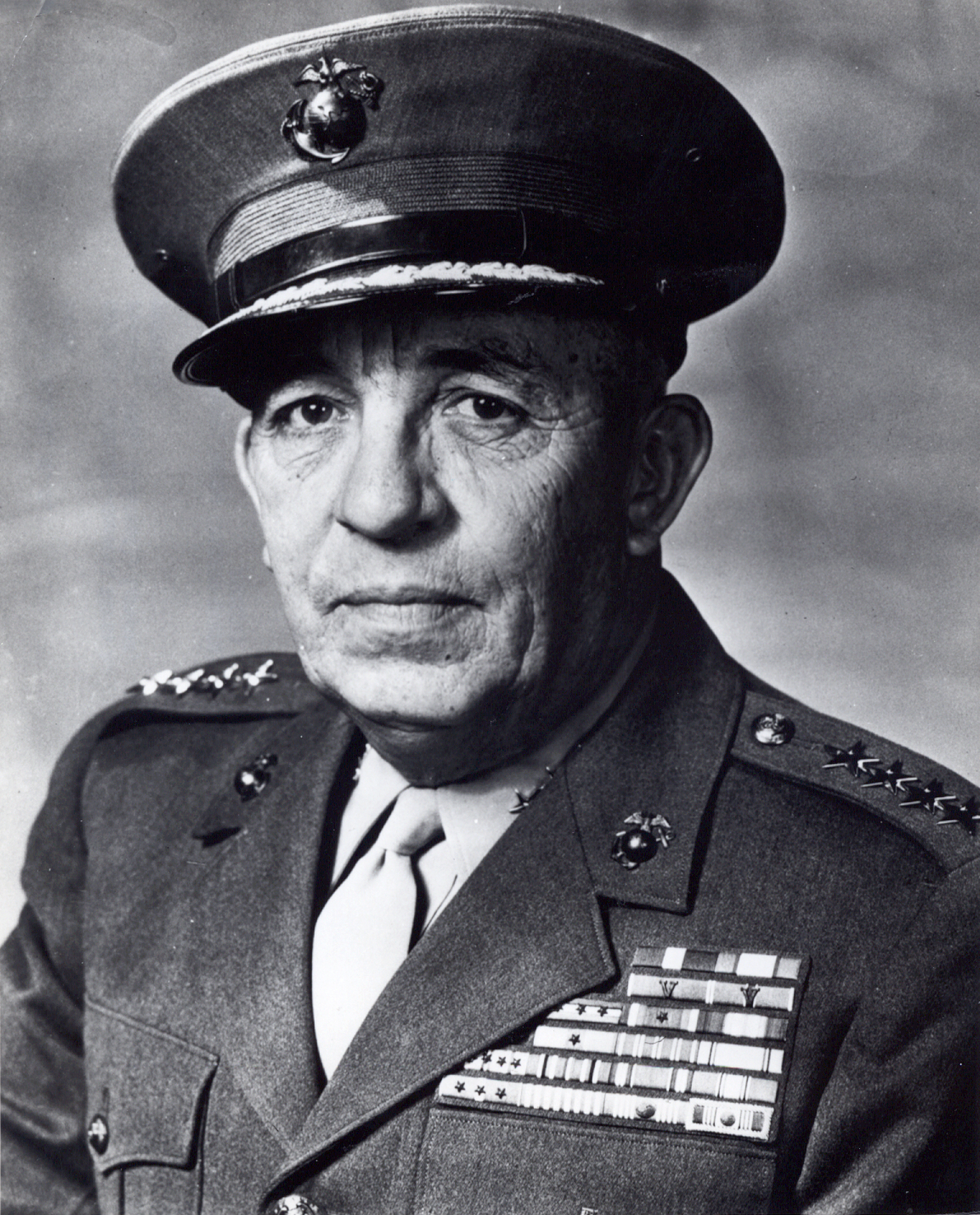
- General Edwin A. Pollock
- Born: March 21, 1899; Augusta, Georgia, U.S.
- Died: November 5, 1982 (aged 83); Charleston, South Carolina, U.S.
- Burial place: Beaufort National Cemetery
- Military career
- Allegiance: United States of America
- Branch: United States Marine Corps
- Service years: 1918–1959
- Rank: General
- Nickname: "Al"
- Commands: Fleet Marine Force, Pacific; Fleet Marine Force, Atlantic; 2nd Marine Division; 1st Marine Division; MCRD Parris Island
- Conflicts: Dominican Campaign; Nicaraguan Campaign; World War II; Battle of Guadalcanal; Battle of the Tenaru; Battle of Cape Gloucester; Battle of Iwo Jima; Korean War; Battle for Outpost Vegas
- Awards: Navy Cross; Army Distinguished Service Medal; Legion of Merit; Bronze Star Medal

Edwin Allen Pollock (21 March 1899 – 5 November 1982) was a United States Marine Corps General and a highly decorated combat veteran of World War II and Korea; he commanded both the 1st and 2d Marine Divisions and is the only man to have served as commanding general of both the Atlantic and Pacific Fleet Marine Force. He had been advanced to the rank of general upon retirement by reason of having been specially commended in combat.

== Early career ==
Edwin A. Pollock was born on 21 March 1899 in Augusta, Georgia. He attended the local Summerville Academy, South Carolina. He spent one year at Staunton Military Academy, Virginia, before he enrolled at The Citadel in Charleston, South Carolina, during the summer of 1918. Graduating with the class of 1921, he received his Bachelor of Science degree in Chemistry and subsequently was appointed a second lieutenant in the Army Reserve that June. Pollock resigned his army commission to accept appointment as a Second Lieutenant in the Marine Corps on July 1, 1921.

He was subsequently sent for further education to the Marine Corps Schools within Marine Barracks Quantico, Virginia. Pollock attended Company Officers' Course and following his graduation in November 1922, he was assigned to the Marine Barracks Parris Island, South Carolina. His first tour of expeditionary duty began in 1923, when he sailed with 2nd Marine Brigade to Santo Domingo, Dominican Republic. Upon withdrawal of the Marine troops at the end of December 1924, Pollock served with West Coast Expeditionary Forces at San Diego, California until September 1926, when he was promoted to the rank of First Lieutenant and transferred to Quantico, he joined the 11th Marine Regiment and sailed for Nicaragua.

Pollock later joined the staff of the 2nd Marine Brigade under General Logan Feland and sailed for expeditionary duty in Nicaragua. He served during the combats against the Sandino's insurgents and participated the famed Coco River patrol under then-Captain Merritt A. Edson. In late 1927, he returned to the United States and was assigned to the Marine Barracks Quantico, Virginia.

The next orders for sea duty came in August 1928, when he was attached to the Marine Detachment aboard the cruiser USS Galveston. He sailed with that ship to the Panama Canal and participated in the watchful cruises between Balboa and Corinto.

Following his return in June 1930, Pollock was assigned to the staff of the Marine Corps Schools, Quantico. During his time there, he spent a period of intensive training aboard the battleship USS Arkansas, while attached to the 1st Marine Regiment. At the beginning of August 1934, Pollock was transferred to the cruiser USS Salt Lake City, where he assumed command of the Marine detachment aboard. While in this capacity, he was promoted to the rank of captain in November 1934.

During June 1936, Pollock was assigned to the Marine barracks at Naval Ammunition Depot St. Julien's Creek, Virginia and spent there one year of duty, before he was ordered to the Philadelphia Navy Yard, where he was appointed as officer in charge of the Publicity Bureau. He was promoted to the rank of major during September 1938 and finally left Philadelphia in June 1939. Pollock was subsequently attached to the Senior Course at the Marine Corps Schools, Quantico and following his graduation, he remained in Quantico Schools as Assistant Instructor in the Base Defense Weapons and Reserve Officers' courses.

== World War II ==
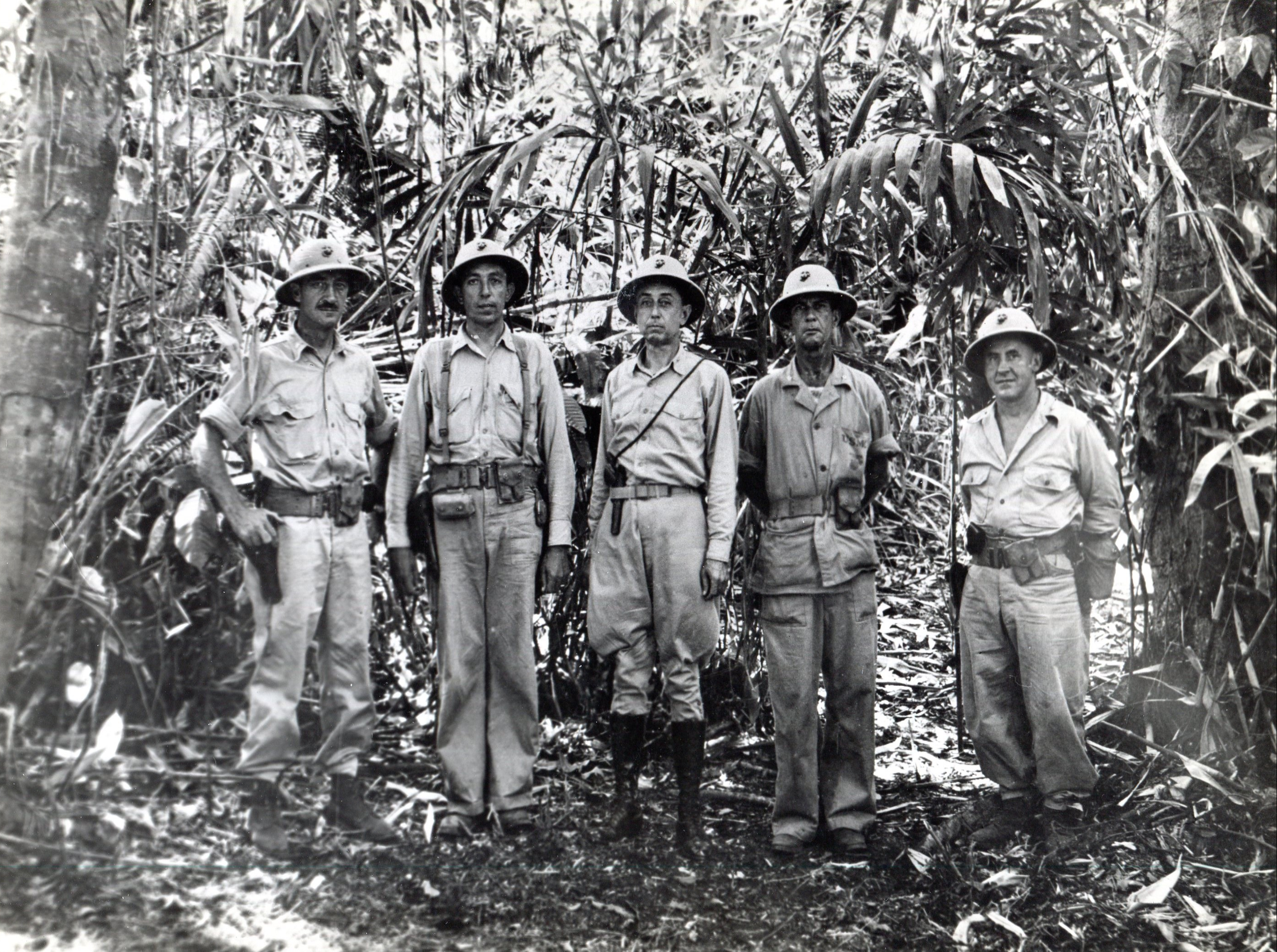
From left to right: Lieutenant colonel Leonard B. Cresswell (1st Battalion), Lieutenant colonel Edwin A. Pollock (Executive Officer 1st Marines), Colonel Clifton B. Cates (Commanding Officer 1st Marines), Lieutenant colonel William N. McKelvy (3rd Battalion) and Lieutenant colonel William W. Stickney (2nd Battalion) on Guadalcanal, October 1942

Following the Japanese Attack on Pearl Harbor, Pollock was promoted to the rank of Lieutenant Colonel January 1942 and subsequently assumed command of the 2nd Battalion, 1st Marine Regiment under Colonel Clifton B. Cates. The 1st Marines went overseas as a part of the 1st Marine Division in June 1942 and Pollock subsequently led his troops on Guadalcanal during the Battle of the Tenaru at the end of August 1942. During the Japanese attack in the night of 20–21 August, 2nd Battalion under Pollock's command hold defensive positions on Tenaru River. Pollock left his command post and advanced through severe enemy mortar and machine-gun fire to a position in the front line, where he directed the defense of his forces for next twelve hours. The men under his command destroyed practically the entire enemy force of seven hundred. For his courage and leadership during the battle, Pollock was decorated with the second-highest decoration awarded for valor in combat, Navy Cross. He also received his first Navy Presidential Unit Citation, which is awarded for gallantry and determination of the whole unit. His Navy Cross citation states in part:

"When the troops under his command were subjected to a powerful and determined surprise attack at the Tenaru River, Lieutenant-Colonel Pollock, immediately leaving his Command Post, advanced through severe enemy mortar and machine-gun fire to a position in the front line, and while thus constantly exposed to extreme danger, directed the defense of our forces for a period of twelve hours. As a result of his excellent judgment and superb leadership, the men under his command destroyed practically the entire enemy force of seven hundred."

Pollock was succeeded by Lieutenant Colonel William W. Stickney on 23 September 1942 and was subsequently appointed Executive Officer of the 1st Marines. He was later transferred to the staff of the 1st Marine Division under Major General William H. Rupertus and appointed Assistant Chief of Staff (G-3) for plans and operations in July 1943. Pollock was promoted to the rank of colonel in November 1943 and then served in this capacity during the Battle of Cape Gloucester in December 1943. He later earned the Legion of Merit with Combat "V" for his part in the battle.

He was transferred to the United States in March 1944 and appointed an instructor at the Army and Navy Staff College. Pollock joined 4th Marine Division under his old superior, Major General Clifton B. Cates in December 1944 and was appointed operations officer. He served in that capacity during the Battle of Iwo Jima in February 1945 and received Bronze Star with Combat "V" for his merits and also second Navy Presidential Unit Citation.

== Later career ==
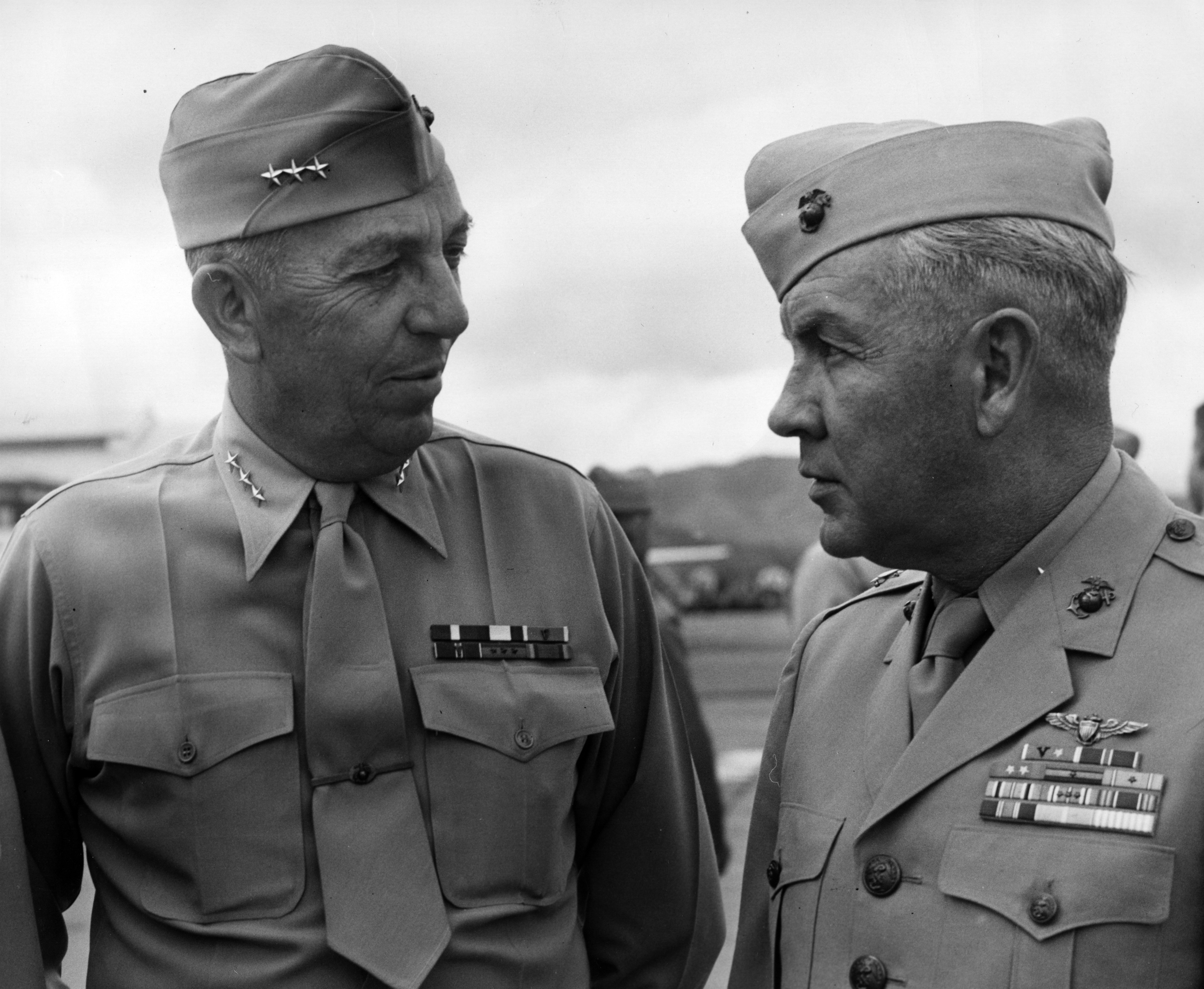
Pollock (left) during the conversation with Brig.Gen. David F. O'Neill, CG, 1st MAW during his inspection tour at MCAS Iwakuni, Japan, July 1956

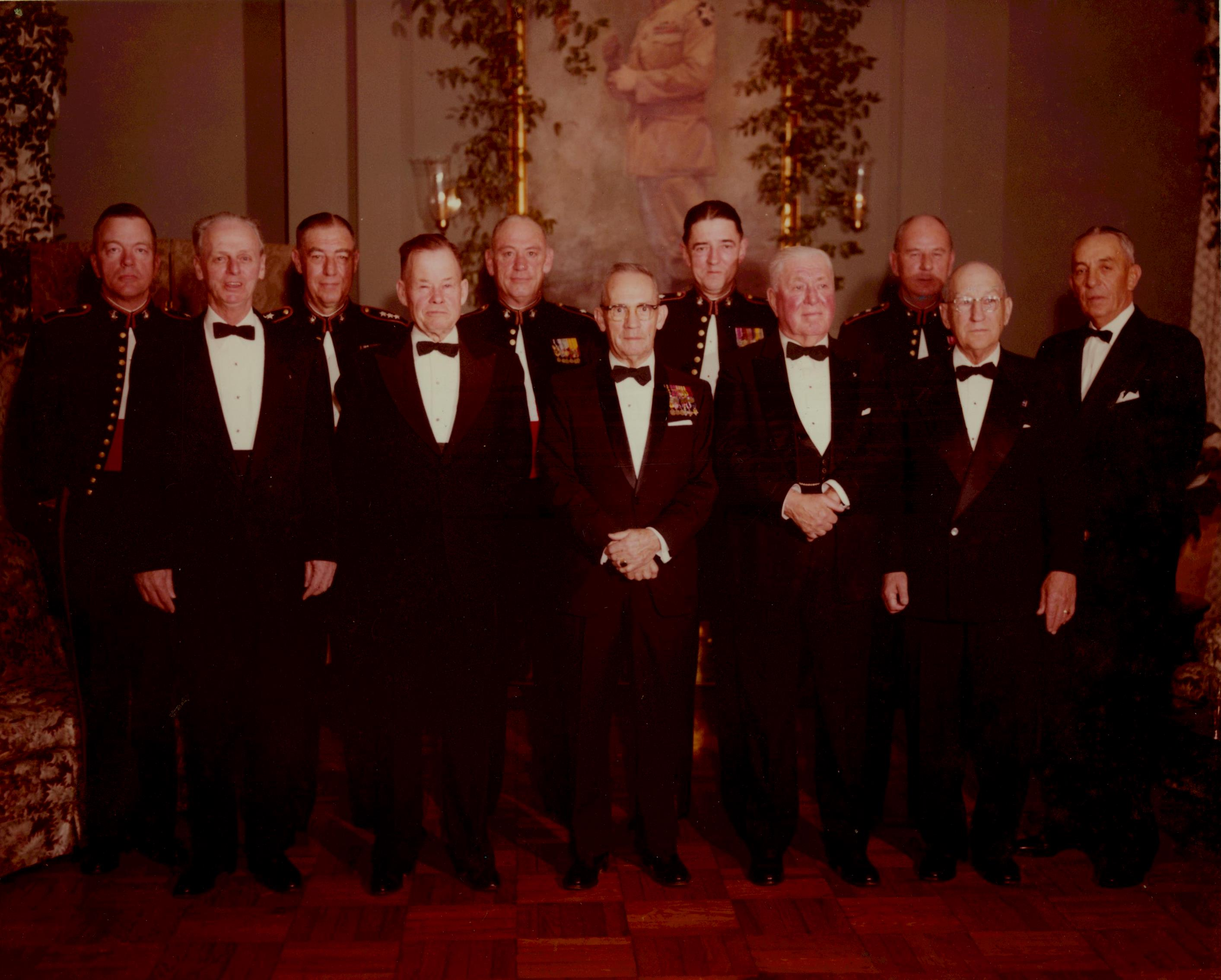
20th Anniversary of 2nd Marine Division, 1961; from left to right: BG Leonard F. Chapman Jr., GEN Franklin A. Hart ret., LTG Joseph C. Burger, LTG Lewis B. Puller ret., BG Odell M. Conoley, LTG Thomas E. Watson ret., MG James P. Berkeley, MG Clayton B. Vogel ret., MG Robert B. Luckey, LTG Julian C. Smith ret. and GEN Edwin A. Pollock ret

In November 1945, Pollock was again ordered to Quantico. He served there successively as Commanding Officer of the Basic School, Executive Officer of the Marine Corps Schools, and Chief of Staff of the Marine barracks. Subsequently assigned to Headquarters Marine Corps, Washington, D.C., he was appointed military secretary to the Commandant of the Marine Corps in June 1948. In July 1949, with his promotion to Brigadier General, he became Director of Plans and Policies at Headquarters Marine Corps.

Pollock was promoted to Major General in October 1951. That December, he became Commanding General of the 2nd Marine Division at Camp Lejeune, North Carolina. In August 1952, he arrived in Korea to assume command of the 1st Marine Division. The Distinguished Service Medal was awarded to him for outstanding service in this capacity during the Korean War from August 1952 to June 1953 during bitter engagements on the Reno-Carson-Vegas Complex.

Shortly after returning from Korea, the general reported to Quantico in July 1953 as director of the Marine Corps Educational Center. A year later, he assumed command of the Marine Corps Recruit Depot, Parris Island, South Carolina. In January 1956, Pollock was promoted to Lieutenant General and appointed Commandant of the Marine Corps Schools, Quantico.

Pollock left Quantico in August 1956 to assume duty the following month at Camp H. M. Smith as Commanding General, Fleet Marine Force, Pacific, Honolulu, T.H. Following this assignment, he served as Commanding General, Fleet Marine Force, Atlantic, Norfolk, Virginia, from December 1957 until his retirement on 1 November 1959.

== Retirement ==
In 1965, he was instrumental in helping found the Marine Military Academy in Harlingen, Texas, and served as the school's first president and commandant, he later served as chairman of the board of visitors at The Citadel and was named chairman emeritus upon the completion of his term.

The auditoriums at the headquarters of the Fleet Marine Force, Atlantic in Norfolk, Virginia, and Marine Corps Forces, Pacific (MARFORPAC) in Hawaii are named in his honor. The bridge leading to the main gate at the Marine Corps Recruit Depot Parris Island, South Carolina is named the General Edwin Pollock Causeway.

Pollock died on 5 November 1982 and is buried at Beaufort National Cemetery, South Carolina.

== Awards and decorations ==
A complete list of the general's medals and decorations include:

1st Row	Navy Cross		Army Distinguished Service Medal	
2nd Row	Legion of Merit with Combat "V"	Bronze Star with Combat "V"	Navy Presidential Unit Citation with three stars	Navy Unit Commendation with one star
3rd Row	World War I Victory Medal	Marine Corps Expeditionary Medal with one star	Second Nicaraguan Campaign Medal	American Defense Service Medal
4th Row	American Campaign Medal	Asiatic-Pacific Campaign Medal with four service stars	World War II Victory Medal	National Defense Service Medal
5th Row	Korean Service Medal with three service stars	Order of Military Merit, Taeguk Cordon Medal	Korean Presidential Unit Citation	United Nations Korea Medal

== See also ==
- Fleet Marine Force, Pacific
- Fleet Marine Force, Atlantic

Military offices
Preceded by Ray A. Robinson	Commanding General of the Fleet Marine Force Atlantic; 1 November 1957 - 1 November 1959	Succeeded by Joseph C. Burger
Preceded by William O. Brice	Commanding General of the Fleet Marine Force Pacific; August 1956 - December 1957	Succeeded by Vernon E. Megee
Preceded by Merwin H. Silverthorn	Commanding General of the Marine Corps Recruit Depot Parris Island; 1 July 1954 - 14 January 1956	Succeeded by Joseph C. Burger
Preceded by John T. Selden	Commanding General of the 1st Marine Division; 29 August 1952 - 15 June 1953	Succeeded by Randolph M. Pate
Preceded by Ray A. Robinson	Commanding General of the 2nd Marine Division; 7 December 1951 - 2 September 1952	Succeeded by Randolph M. Pate
