= Odell M. Conoley =

American Marine Corps general

Odell Maurice Conoley
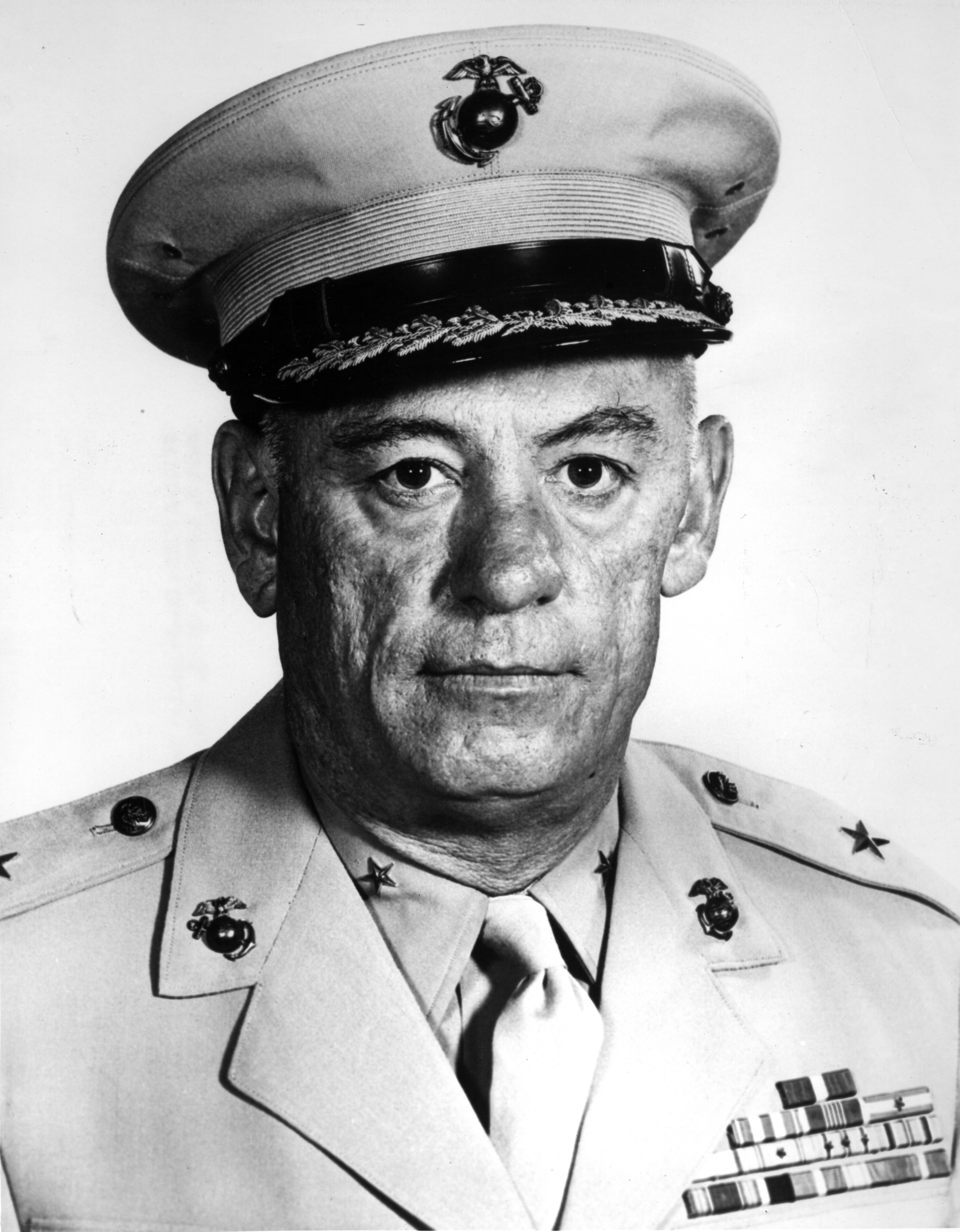
- BG Odell M. Conoley, USMC
- Born: November 9, 1913; Amarillo, Texas, US
- Died: September 1, 1993 (aged 79); San Diego, California, US
- Burial place: Arlington National Cemetery
- Military career
- Allegiance: United States of America
- Branch: United States Marine Corps
- Service years: 1935–1964
- Rank: Brigadier general
- Nickname: "Tex" or "Dog Eye" (at university)
- Service number: 0–5183
- Commands: 2nd Marine Division; 7th Marine Regiment; 2nd Battalion, 7th Marines
- Conflicts: Yangtze Patrol; World War II: Battle of Guadalcanal; Actions along the Matanikau; Battle of Cape Gloucester; Philippines Campaign
- Awards: Navy Cross; Silver Star; Legion of Merit; Army Commendation Medal

Odell Maurice Conoley (November 9, 1913 – September 1, 1993) was a highly decorated officer of the United States Marine Corps with the rank of brigadier general, who is most noted for his service with 2nd Battalion, 7th Marines during World War II. He completed his career as deputy director for Operations, Plans, Policies and Operations Division, staff of the commander in chief, United States European Command, in Paris, France.

== Early career ==
Odell M. Conoley was born on November 9, 1913, in Amarillo, Texas, as the son of Orin M. Conoley. He attended local high school and subsequently enrolled the Texas A&M University in College Station. While at the university, Conoley was a member of Marketing and Finance Club, Panhandle Club and also played for Varsity Football team. He also entered the Reserve Officers' Training Corps unit and was commissioned reserve second lieutenant of infantry on May 25, 1935. Conoley graduated with Bachelor of Arts degree in June of that year and subsequently resigned his reserve commission in order to accept appointment as second lieutenant in the Marines on September 11, 1935.

He was subsequently ordered to the Basic School at Philadelphia Navy Yard for further officer training and completed the school in May 1936. Conoley was then stationed with 6th Marines at Marine Corps Base San Diego until September 1937, when he sailed for expeditionary duty to China. He served with the American Embassy Guard detachment in Beiping and subsequently with 4th Marines in Tianjin until November 1938.

Following his return stateside, Conoley was promoted to the rank of first lieutenant and after brief service in San Diego, he was appointed commanding officer of Marine detachment aboard the transport ship USS Henderson in May 1939. While aboard the Henderson, Conoley took part in several cruises with replacements to China, until he was ordered to Parris Island, South Carolina, in August 1940 and attached to 2nd Battalion, 7th Marines, 1st Marine Brigade under Major General Holland M. Smith. He also took part in extended amphibious training in Guantánamo Bay, Cuba during October 1940.

== World War II ==
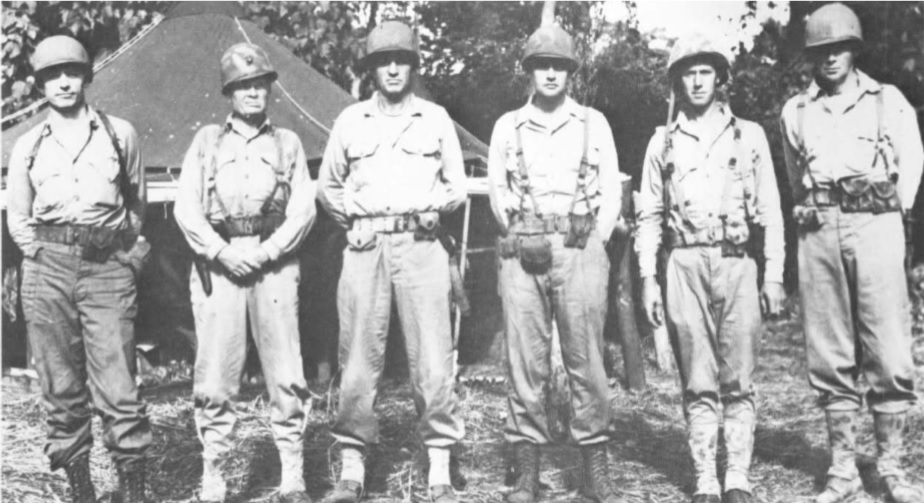
Senior officers of 7th Marine Regiment at New Britain, January 1944. From left to right: LTC Odell M. Conoley (Commanding 2nd Battalion), LTC Lewis B. Puller (Regimental Executive Officer), COL Julian N. Frisbie (Regimental Commanding Officer), LTC Henry W. Buse Jr. (Commanding 3rd Battalion), LTC John E. Weber (Commanding 1st Battalion) and CPT John E. Buckley (Commanding Regimental Weapons Company).

After the Japanese attack on Pearl Harbor, Conoley was promoted to the rank of captain on December 10, 1941, and appointed 2nd Battalion's Executive officer under famous Lieutenant Colonel Herman H. Hanneken. He was promoted to the rank of major in May 1942 and sailed to the Pacific area at the same time. He was stationed on American Samoa and participated with the 7th Marine Regiment in the intensive jungle training until August of that year, when they were relieved by 22nd Marines and ordered with 1st Marine Division to Guadalcanal, Solomon Islands.

Conoley landed with his regiment on Guadalcanal on September 18, 1942, and took part in the actions against Japanese forces during the fighting along the Matanikau River on October 9. Japanese forces then launched counterattack on October 25 and Conoley distinguished himself during that action and was decorated with the Navy Cross, the United States military's second-highest decoration awarded for valor in combat.

His official Navy Cross citation reads:

The President of the United States of America takes pleasure in presenting the Navy Cross to Captain Odell M. Conoley (MCSN: 0–5183), United States Marine Corps, for extraordinary heroism and distinguished service while serving with the Second Battalion, Seventh Marines, FIRST Marine Division, during action against enemy Japanese forces on Guadalcanal, Solomon Islands, on 26 October 1942. While under tremendous fire during an assault by hostile forces, major Conoley, with courageous initiative and skillful leadership, organized a group of Marines and counterattacked a numerically superior unit of Japanese troops who had seized a ridge previously held by one of the companies in his own Battalion. After killing two-thirds of the enemy force and driving off the remainder, he and his group captured many rounds of ammunition and much equipment from the enemy. His heroic conduct, maintained at great personal risk in the face of grave danger, was in keeping with the highest traditions of the United States Naval Service.

Conoley served on Guadalcanal with the 7th Marine Regiment under Colonel Amor L. Sims until the beginning of February 1943, when the island was declared secured. Seventh Marines were subsequently shipped to Australia for rest and refit and he spent next eight months with training and preparations for upcoming New Britain campaign. While in Australia, he was promoted to the rank of lieutenant colonel in July 1943 and appointed commanding officer 2nd Battalion, 7th Marines.

During October 1943, units of 1st Marine Division were transferred to staging area at Oro Bay, New Guinea to prepare for the amphibious landing, which was scheduled for December 26. After another two months of preparations, Conoley landed with his battalion on Cape Gloucester during the morning of December 26. He fought his way toward the airfields, which were the main target of the operation and met heavy resistance from Japanese battalion under Major Shinichi Takabe. Even under enemy mortar fire, Conoley led his men to victory and successfully repulsed repeated and determined counterattacks with heavy losses to the enemy.

At the beginning of February 1944, he was transferred to the staff of 5th Marine Regiment under Colonel John T. Selden and served as his executive officer until February 20. Conoley was subsequently ordered to the United States and received the Silver Star for his service at Cape Gloucester.

Upon his return to the United States and brief leave at home, Conoley was ordered to Infantry Course at the Army Command and General Staff College at Fort Leavenworth, Kansas and graduated in the fall of 1944. He was then ordered to the Marine Corps Base San Diego under Brigadier General Archie F. Howard and appointed commanding officer of Reclassification and Redistribution Center there.

In this capacity, Conoley commanded personnel of 14 officers, 197 enlisted men and 105 Women Reserves and was responsible for the providing of quick and efficient methods of handling and assisting Marines of the Fleet Marine Force, Pacific returning from the Pacific area. Men recently returned from overseas going through the center are given reclassification interviews, assigned to a duty station in the States, furnished new clothing, issued ID cards, paid and are started on furloughs.

Conoley was ordered overseas again in July 1945, when he was attached to the headquarters of U.S. Sixth Army under General Walter Krueger in Philippines. He was later transferred to the headquarters of U.S. Eight Army under Lieutenant General Robert L. Eichelberger in Yokohama, Japan and served as assistant operations officer and liaison officer until January 1947. Conoley was decorated with Army Commendation Medal for his service in that capacity.

== Later service ==
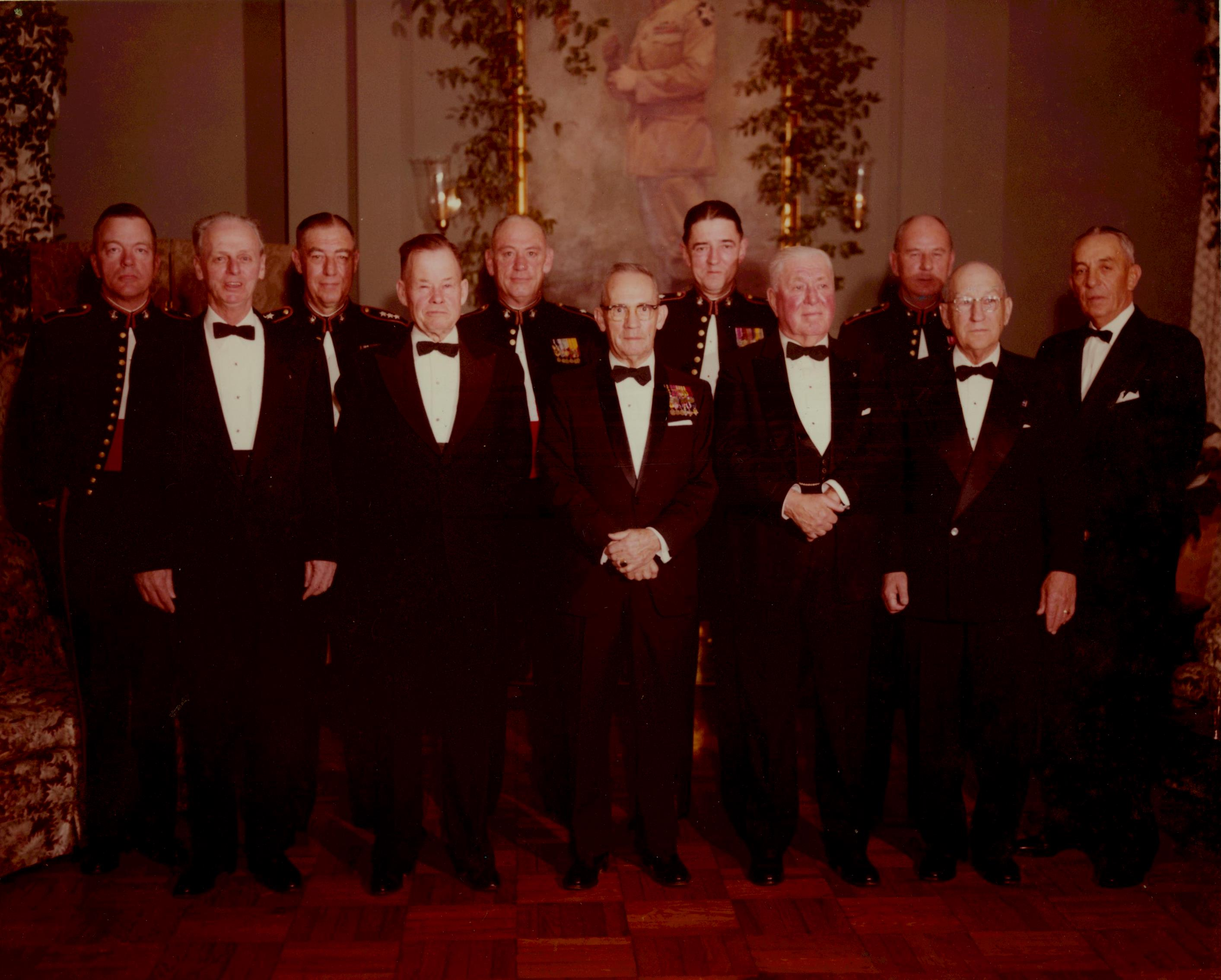
20th Anniversary of 2nd Marine Division, 1961; from left to right: BG Leonard F. Chapman Jr., GEN Franklin A. Hart ret., LTG Joseph C. Burger, LTG Lewis B. Puller ret., BG Odell M. Conoley, LTG Thomas Eugene Watson ret., MG James P. Berkeley, MG Clayton B. Vogel ret., MG Robert B. Luckey, LTG Julian C. Smith ret. and GEN Edwin A. Pollock ret.

He was ordered to the States in January 1947 and attached as an instructor to the Troop Training Unit, Amphibious Forces, Pacific Fleet under Brigadier General Alfred H. Noble, before he was transferred to the Headquarters Marine Corps in Washington, D.C., as operations officer, Operations Section, Division of Plans and Policies. Conoley served next three years in this capacity under Major General Ray A. Robinson, before he was ordered in July 1950 to the course at Army War College in Carlisle, Pennsylvania.

Conoley was promoted to the rank of colonel during the studies in February 1951 and completed the course in July of that year. He then assumed duties as an instructor at Marine Corps Base Quantico before he was appointed assistant chief of staff for logistics of the Quantico Schools in December 1951. He left Quantico at the end of July 1954 and sailed to Korea, where assumed duties as deputy chief of staff. However, truce was already in effect, and Conoley saw no fighting in that country.

In October 1954, Conoley assumed command of 7th Marine Regiment, a unit in which he served during most of his World War II combat career. He commanded the regiment during the securing of Korean Demilitarized Zone and also during several training exercises. Conoley brought 7th Marines home in June 1955 and subsequently assumed responsibility as chief of staff, 1st Marine Division under Major General Merrill B. Twining.

He served with the division until May 1956, when he was ordered to the Marine Corps Base Quantico and appointed member of Advance Research Group, which was tasked with the development of the recommendations on how the MAGTF should evolve structurally to meet the challenges of atomic warfare and new technologies such as helicopters and jet aircraft. Conoley was later appointed chief of staff, Marine Corps Educational Center Quantico and deputy director of the Marine Corps Educational Center in September 1957.

Conoley was transferred to Camp Lejeune, North Carolina, in July 1959 and appointed assistant division commander, 2nd Marine Division under Major General Joseph C. Burger. When General Burger was promoted to the three-star rank and appointed commanding general of Fleet Marine Force, Atlantic on October 25 of that year, Conoley assumed temporary command of the division. He held that command until the beginning of November and then reverted to his previous capacity of assistant commander. Conoley was also promoted to the rank of brigadier general for his new billet at the same time.

He was detached from Second Marine Division in April 1961 and ordered to Paris, France as deputy director for Operations, Plans, Policies and Operations Division, staff of the commander in chief, United States European Command under General Lauris Norstad. Conoley distinguished himself in this capacity during the Congo Crisis and later during the Cyprus crisis, and received the Legion of Merit for his service. He was ordered back to the States in May 1964 and retired from the active service on June 1, 1964.

Conoley settled in San Diego and grew orchids and played golf together with his wife France Blanche Lewis Conoley, with whom he had four children. Brigadier General Conoley died on September 1, 1993, and was buried with full military honors at Arlington National Cemetery, Virginia.

== Decorations ==
Here is the ribbon bar of Brigadier General Odell M. Conoley:

1st Row	Navy Cross			
2nd Row	Silver Star	Legion of Merit	Army Commendation Medal	Navy Presidential Unit Citation with one star
3rd Row	China Service Medal	American Defense Service Medal with Base Clasp	Asiatic-Pacific Campaign Medal with three 3/16 inch service stars	American Campaign Medal
4th Row	World War II Victory Medal	Navy Occupation Service Medal	National Defense Service Medal with one star	Philippine Liberation Medal

== See also ==
- List of 2nd Marine Division Commanders

Military offices
Preceded by Joseph C. Burger	Commanding General of 2nd Marine Division; October 25, 1959 – November 5, 1959	Succeeded by James P. Berkeley
