= Robert B. Luckey =

American Marine Corps Lieutenant General

Robert Burneston Luckey
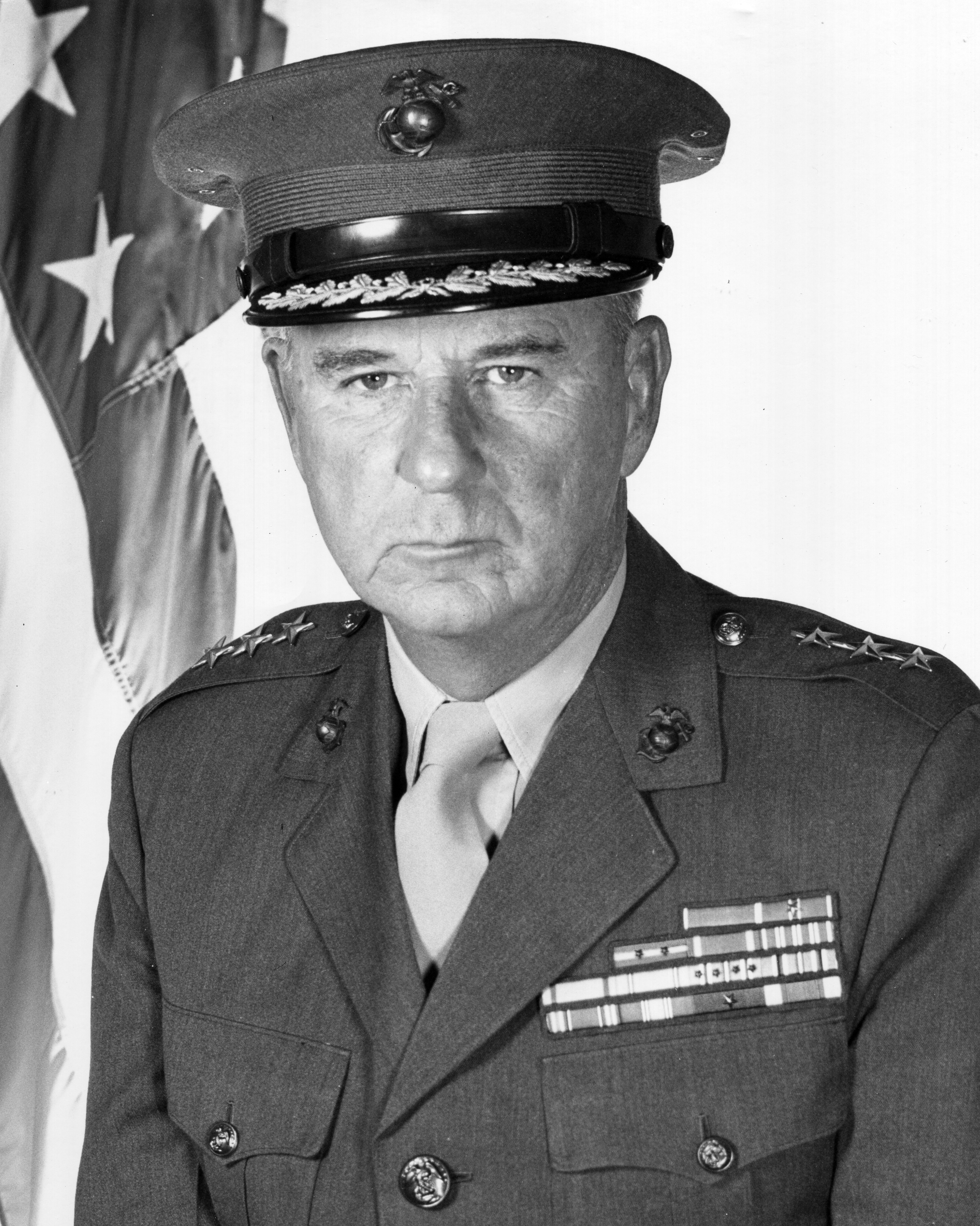
- LTG Robert B. Luckey, USMC
- Born: July 9, 1905; Hyattsville, Maryland, U.S.
- Died: September 9, 1974 (aged 69); West Tisbury, Massachusetts, U.S.
- Relatives: BG Meriwether L. Walker (father-in-law)
- Military career
- Allegiance: United States of America
- Branch: United States Marine Corps
- Service years: 1927–1963
- Rank: Lieutenant general
- Nickname: "Bob"
- Service number: 0–4289
- Commands: Fleet Marine Force, Atlantic; Camp Lejeune; 3rd Marine Division; MCRD Parris Island; 10th Marine Regiment; 4th Marine Regiment; 15th Marine Regiment
- Conflicts: Nicaraguan Campaign; Yangtze Patrol; World War II: Battle of Guadalcanal; Battle of Cape Gloucester; Battle of Okinawa; Chinese Civil War
- Awards: Legion of Merit; Bronze Star Medal (2)

Robert Burneston Luckey (July 9, 1905 – September 9, 1974) was a decorated officer in the United States Marine Corps with the rank of lieutenant general. A veteran of several wars, Luckey completed his career as commanding general, Fleet Marine Force, Atlantic.

== Early career ==
Robert B. Luckey was born on July 9, 1905, in Hyattsville, Maryland, but his family later moved to Washington, D.C., where he graduated from Central High School in summer 1923. He then enrolled the University of Maryland in College Park and was a member of ROTC unit as Cadet First lieutenant.

Luckey graduated with Bachelor of Arts in June 1927 and entered the Marine Corps service on August 10 of that year. He was commissioned second lieutenant on that date and was ordered to the Basic School at Philadelphia Navy Yard for basic officer training, which he completed in February 1928. Luckey was subsequently attached to 2nd Marine Brigade and sailed for expeditionary duty to Nicaragua.

He participated in the jungle patrols against bandit forces under Augusto César Sandino and received Nicaraguan Presidential Medal of Merit with Diploma for his service. Luckey was ordered back to the United States in July 1929 and served with Marine Barracks at the United States Naval Academy at Annapolis, Maryland, for some time, before he entered the Sea School at the Portsmouth Navy Yard.

Luckey was attached to the Marine detachment aboard the heavy cruiser USS Rochester in June 1930 and served as commander of the Electronical Guard Detachment. While in this capacity, he took part in the relief operations in Carazo Department, Nicaragua during the earthquake in 1931.

He was detached in February 1932 and served consecutively with the Marine detachments aboard light cruiser USS Memphis and gunboat USS Fulton in the West Indies and Panama Canal Zone. During his service in the Canal Zone, Luckey met Carey Walker, a daughter of Army Brigadier general Meriwether L. Walker, a Governor of the Panama Canal Zone and they were married few months later.

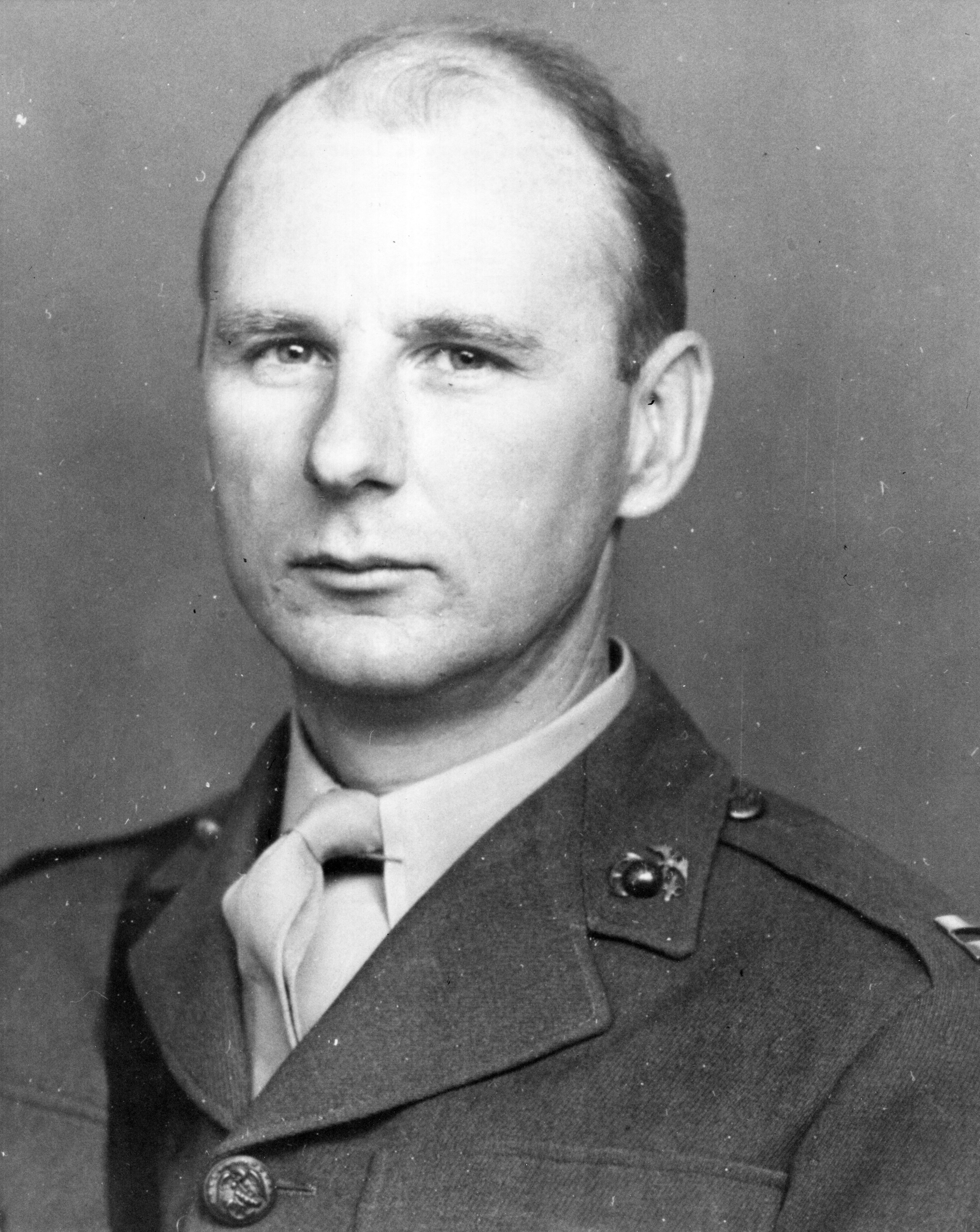
Luckey as Captain in November 1936

In July 1932, Luckey was sent to the Marine barracks at Norfolk Navy Yard and remained there until he was ordered to the Battery Officers' Course at the Army Field Artillery School at Fort Sill, Oklahoma in September 1933.

Luckey completed the course in June 1934 and ordered to San Diego, where he was attached to 10th Marine Artillery Regiment. However, due to budget cuts during the Great Depression, the Tenth Marines were reduced to one understrength battalion with only 98 men under the command of Major Harold S. Fassett. Luckey served as Battery Officer and was promoted to first lieutenant in January 1935.

He sailed for China in January 1936 and was attached to the Marine detachment at the American embassy in Peking. Luckey was promoted to captain in November of that year and transferred to the 2nd Marine Brigade in Shanghai in January 1938. He participated in the guard duty at Shanghai International Settlement during a period of tensions between China and Japan.

Upon his return to the United States in April 1938, Luckey was ordered to the Marine Barracks, Quantico, Virginia, and appointed aide-de-camp to the commanding general of that base, James C. Breckinridge. In July 1939, Luckey was appointed Post Adjutant consecutively under generals Breckinridge and Louis M. Little and served in that capacity until October of that year. He was subsequently transferred back to 1st Battalion, 10th Marines under Lieutenant Colonel Raphael Griffin and served as Commander of Battery C.

He led his battery during the Fleet Exercise at Culebra, Puerto Rico and was transferred to the headquarters, 1st Marine Brigade, Fleet Marine Force under Brigadier General Holland Smith, before he returned to the United States.

== World War II ==
Luckey was transferred to the newly activated 11th Marine Regiment under Colonel Pedro del Valle at Parris Island, South Carolina in April 1941. The Eleventh Marines served as the main artillery component of newly designated 1st Marine Division and Luckey assumed duty as battalion Executive and operations officer under Lieutenant Colonel Joseph R. Knowlan.

Following the United States entry into World War II, Luckey was promoted to major in January 1942 and assumed command of the 1st Special Weapons Battalion, which served as a unit of antiaircraft and antitank guns for 1st Marine Division. He embarked with his battalion to the Pacific area in June 1942 and after a period of training in Wellington, New Zealand, Luckey led his battalion to Guadalcanal in August of that year. He was promoted to lieutenant colonel in September 1942.

After two months of combat, Luckey was appointed executive officer, 11th Marine Regiment under Colonel Pedro del Valle and served in that capacity during the later stages of Guadalcanal Campaign. He later took part in the Battle of Cape Gloucester at New Britain in December 1943 and January 1944 and received the Bronze Star Medal with Combat "V" for his service there.

Luckey was ordered back to the United States in February 1944 and following a brief leave at home, he was appointed director of the Artillery School at Marine Corps Schools, Quantico. He held that command until October of that year, when he was ordered back to the Pacific area for duty as commanding officer, 15th Marine Regiment. The 15th Marines were designated as the main artillery component for the newly established 6th Marine Division. Luckey was promoted to colonel in December 1944.

He participated in the period of the division's training at Guadalcanal, which now served as its base area. Luckey and his regiment sailed for Okinawa in April 1945 and saw heavy fighting during the battle on that island. He distinguished himself again and received the Legion of Merit with Combat "V" for his service.

== Postwar service ==
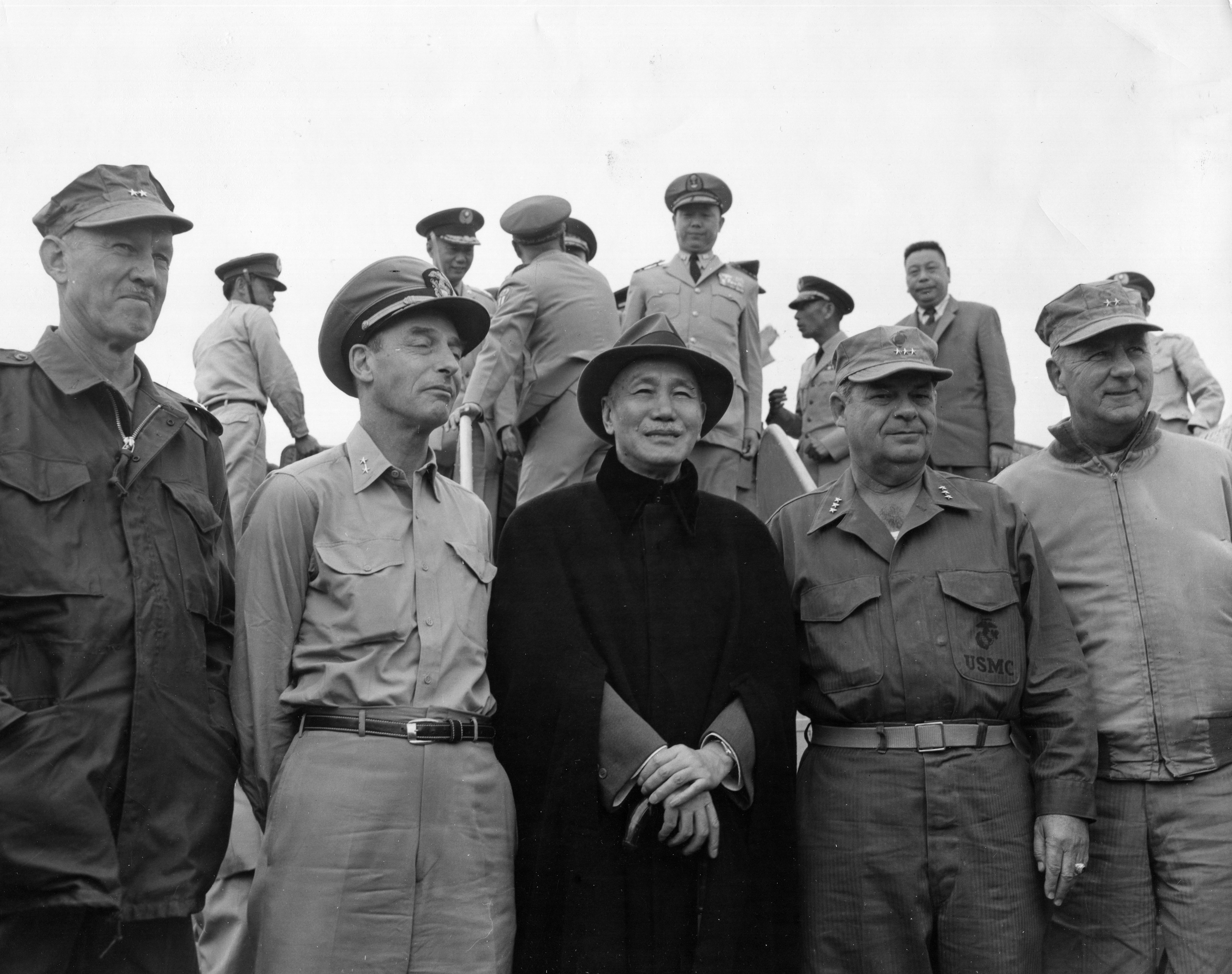
The Visit of Chiang Kai-shek during the fleet exercise on March 27, 1960. From left to right: MG Richard C. Mangrum (CG, 1st MAW), RADM Charles O. Triebel (Commander, Amphibious Group ONE), Chiang Kai-shek, LTG Thomas A. Wornham (CG, FMFPac) and Luckey (CG, 3rd Marine Division).

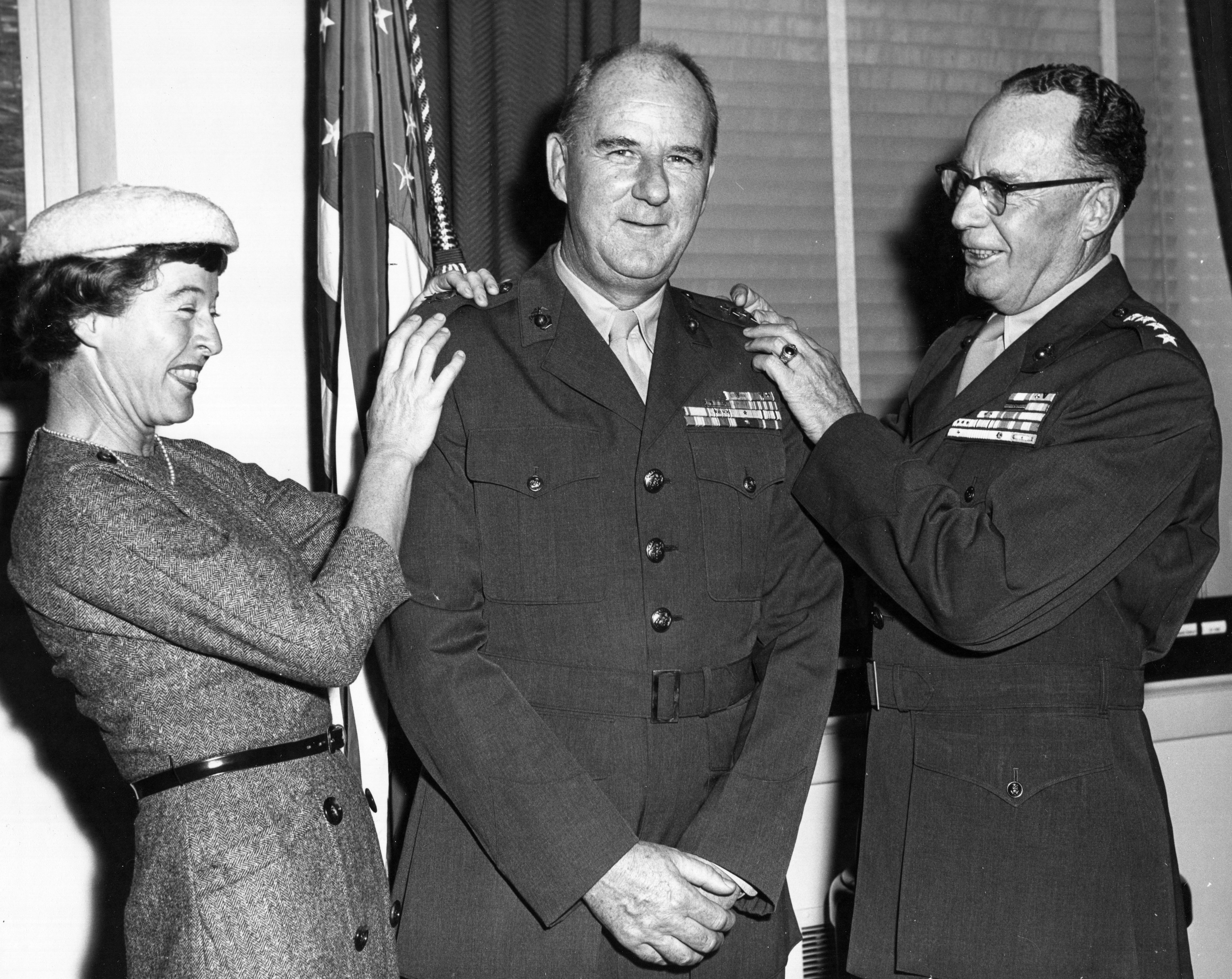
Luckey during his promotion to Major general by his wife and Commandant Randolph M. Pate

Luckey and his regiment were ordered to Qingdao, China, where he participated in the surrender and repatriation of the Japanese forces in that country. For his service in China, he was decorated with his second Bronze Star Medal and also received the Order of the Cloud and Banner by the government of Republic of China.

The 15th Marines were deactivated with the rest of 6th Marine Division in March 1946 and Luckey departed for the United States. Upon his arrival in the States, he entered the Senior course at the Naval War College in Newport, Rhode Island, and graduated in June 1947.

Luckey was subsequently ordered to Camp Lejeune, North Carolina and assumed command of 4th Marine Regiment and held that command until November of that year, when he assumed command of 10th Marine Regiment. The Tenth Marines served as the main artillery component of 2nd Marine Division under Major General Thomas E. Watson. Luckey held that command until June 1949, when he assumed command of Marine Barracks, Washington, D.C.

In July 1951, Luckey was transferred back to Camp Lejeune and assumed duty as assistant chief of staff for operations on the staff of 2nd Marine Division. He served in this capacity consecutively under major generals Ray A. Robinson and Edwin A. Pollock and later assumed duty as divisional chief of staff.

Luckey was transferred to the staff of Marine Corps Schools, Quantico in July 1953 and assumed duty as chief of staff under Lieutenant General Clifton B. Cates. While in this capacity, Luckey was co-responsible for the organization of Marine Corps commissioned personnel training at the Basic School, Amphibious Warfare School, Officer Candidate School, Marine Corps Command and Staff College and other facilities.

He was promoted to brigadier general in August 1954 and ordered to Camp Lejeune for duty as commanding general, Force Troops, Fleet Marine Force Atlantic (FMFLANT). In this capacity, he was responsible for all independent units under FMFLANT such as support artillery units, antiaircraft artillery units, military police battalions, separate engineer units and other miscellaneous force units.

Luckey left Camp Lejeune in June 1955 and reported at the Headquarters Marine Corps in Washington, D.C., for duty as deputy assistant chief of staff for plans (G-3). While in this capacity, he served as deputy to Major General Robert E. Hogaboom, who formed so-called "Hogaboom Board", the Composition and Structure Board which studied and came up with recommendations for revised tables of organization of Marine Corps units, among other things.

In June 1956, Luckey was appointed deputy chief of staff for research and development and was promoted to major general in November of that year. He was transferred to the command of Marine Corps Recruit Depot Parris Island in July 1957 and was responsible for the recruit training on the East Coast of the United States until May 1959, when he was succeeded by future Commandant, David M. Shoup.

Luckey then departed for the Far East and assumed command of 3rd Marine Division on Okinawa, Japan. He remained there until October 1960, when he returned to the United States for duty as commanding general, Camp Lejeune.

On November 1, 1961, Luckey was promoted to lieutenant general and assumed command of Fleet Marine Force, Atlantic and held that command during the Cuban Missile Crisis emergency in October 1962. He also supported the employment of helicopters in the Amphibious Warfare. He held that command until August 1, 1963, when he was succeeded by James P. Berkeley and retired from active duty after 36 years of Marine Corps service.

== Death ==
Lieutenant General Robert B. Luckey settled in West Tisbury, Massachusetts, and died there on September 9, 1974, aged 69. He was married to the former Miss Cary Walker of Vineyard Haven, Massachusetts, daughter of Army Brigadier General Meriwether Lewis Walker and granddaughter of Brigadier General Asa B. Carey. They have a daughter, Laura, and two sons, Thomas and William.

== Decorations ==
Here is the ribbon bar of Lieutenant General Robert B. Luckey:

1st row	Legion of Merit with Combat "V"			
2nd row	Bronze Star Medal with Combat "V" and one 5/16" Gold Star	Navy Presidential Unit Citation with two stars	Navy Unit Commendation	Second Nicaraguan Campaign Medal
3rd row	China Service Medal	American Defense Service Medal with Fleet Clasp	Asiatic-Pacific Campaign Medal with four 3/16 inch service stars	American Campaign Medal
4th row	World War II Victory Medal	National Defense Service Medal with one star	Nicaraguan Presidential Medal of Merit with Diploma	Order of the Cloud and Banner, 5th Class (Republic of China)

== See also ==
- List of 3rd Marine Division Commanders

Military offices
Preceded by Joseph C. Burger	Commanding General, Fleet Marine Force, Atlantic; November 1, 1961 – August 1, 1963	Succeeded by James P. Berkeley
Preceded by Sidney S. Wade	Commanding General, Camp Lejeune; October 21, 1960 – October 31, 1961	Succeeded by James P. Berkeley
Preceded by Lewis C. Hudson	Commanding General, 3rd Marine Division; June 20, 1959 – August 31, 1960	Succeeded by Donald M. Weller
Preceded by George R. E. Shell	Commanding General, Marine Corps Recruit Depot Parris Island; July 5, 1957 – May 10, 1959	Succeeded by David M. Shoup
