= Alpha L. Bowser =

United States Marine Corps general

Alpha Lyons Bowser
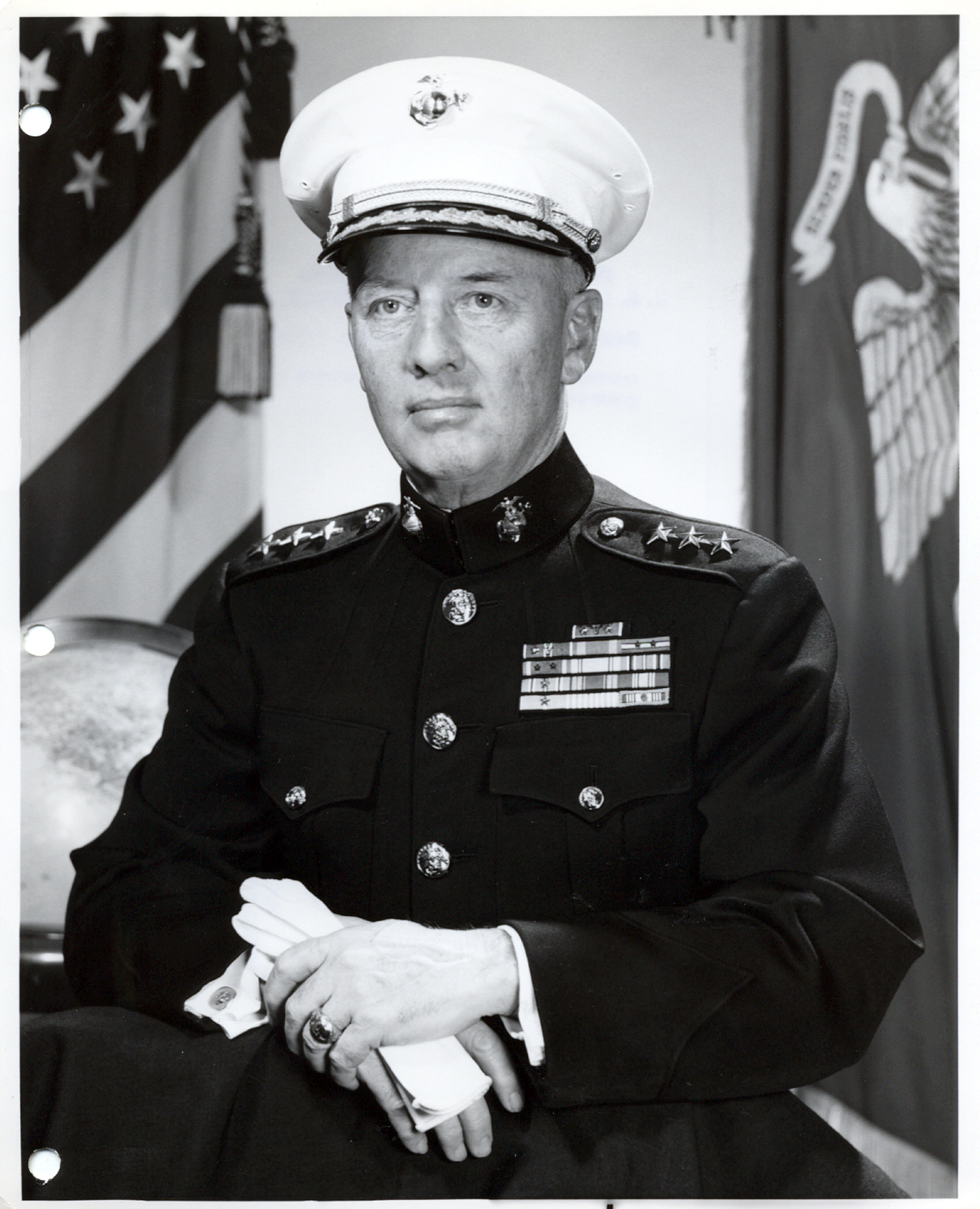
- Lieutenant General Alpha L. Bowser, USMC
- Born: August 21, 1910; Crafton, Pennsylvania, U.S.
- Died: July 13, 2003 (aged 92); Kailua, Honolulu County, Hawaii, U.S.
- Burial place: San Diego, California
- Relatives: Mary Heath Clapp (wife); Joan Bowser (daughter)
- Military career
- Allegiance: United States of America
- Branch: United States Marine Corps
- Service years: 1932–1967
- Rank: Lieutenant general
- Nicknames: "Alph", "Al"
- Service number: 0-4749
- Commands: Fleet Marine Force, Atlantic; Camp Lejeune; MCB Twentynine Palms
- Conflicts: World War II; New Georgia Campaign; Bougainville Campaign; Recapture of Guam; Battle of Iwo Jima; Korean War; Battle of Incheon; Battle of Seoul; Battle of Chosin Reservoir
- Awards: Distinguished Service Medal; Legion of Merit (with "V") (3); Bronze Star (2)

Alpha Lyons Bowser (August 21, 1910 – July 13, 2003) was a United States Marine Corps lieutenant general. He was a combat veteran of World War II and the Korean War – decorated for his actions during the Battle of Iwo Jima and in the Battle of Chosin Reservoir.

== Biography ==
Alpha Lyons Bowser was born on August 21, 1910, in Crafton, Pennsylvania. He graduated from high school in Crafton in 1928. He entered the United States Naval Academy that year, and was commissioned a Marine Corps second lieutenant upon graduation on June 2, 1932.

=== Early Marine Corps career ===
Bowser completed the Basic School at the Philadelphia Navy Yard in June 1933, and later saw duty on the USS Texas (BB-35). In July 1934, he was assigned to the 1st Marine Brigade, Quantico, Virginia. He served there until July 1935, when he was promoted to first lieutenant.

Bowser then entered the Army Field Artillery School at Fort Sill, Oklahoma, and upon completing the course in June 1936, returned to Quantico. In June 1937, he joined the Marine detachment on the USS Nevada (BB-36). He was promoted to captain in October 1938.

Detached from the Nevada in January 1939, Bowser was transferred to San Diego, California. He served on the 2nd Brigade Staff and commanded artillery batteries there until June 1940, when he returned to Quantico to serve as an artillery instructor for two years. He was promoted to major in May 1942.

=== World War II ===
In July 1942, Bowser joined the 3rd Marine Division at Camp Lejeune, North Carolina, serving initially as commanding officer, 2nd Battalion, 12th Marines, and later as Assistant G-3. He moved with his unit to San Diego that October, and sailed for the Pacific area in January 1943. He was promoted to lieutenant colonel in March 1943.

Bowser served as an observer during the New Georgia Campaign in August 1943, and as Assistant G-3 and G-3 of the 3rd Marine Division during the Bougainville Campaign in November and December 1943. For heroic achievement in the latter assignment, he was awarded his first Bronze Star.

In February 1944, Bowser was given command of the 3rd 105mm Howitzer Battalion, 12th Marines, 3rd Marine Division. He was awarded a second Bronze Star Medal for outstanding service in this capacity during the recapture of Guam, and his first Legion of Merit with Combat "V" during the Iwo Jima campaign.

Following his return to the United States in May 1945, Bowser was stationed at Headquarters Marine Corps as Chief, Records Branch, Personnel Department, until May 1946. He then served for three years on the staff of the Marine Corps Schools at Quantico. He was promoted to colonel in August 1949.

=== Korean War ===
In September 1949, Bowser joined the staff of Fleet Marine Force, Pacific, in Honolulu, Hawaii, as assistant G-3 and naval gunfire officer. He served in this capacity until July 1950, when he was ordered to Korea. There he served as assistant chief of staff, G-3, 1st Marine Division. For outstanding service during the Inchon-Seoul and Chosin Reservoir actions, respectively, he was awarded a second and third Legion of Merit with Combat "V".

=== 1950s and 1960s ===
After his return from Korea in May 1951, Col Bowser served at Camp Pendleton, California, as assistant chief of staff, G-3, of the Marine Corps Base, until February 1952, when he became chief of staff of the 3rd Marine Division. In July 1952, he was ordered to Paris, France, where he served until July 1954 as staff officer, Plans Branch, and senior Marine officer, Supreme Headquarters, Allied Powers, Europe (SHAPE). On his return to Washington, he entered the National War College in August 1954, completing the course in June 1955.

In July 1955, Bowser transferred to San Diego and began a year's duty on the staff of commander, Amphibious Force, U.S. Pacific Fleet, as assistant chief of staff for troop operations and training, and force Marine officer. In August 1956, he assumed command of the Recruit Training Command, Marine Corps Recruit Depot, San Diego. He was promoted to brigadier general in September 1956.

Bowser served in San Diego until June 1958, when he became assistant division commander, 1st Marine Division, Camp Pendleton. In January 1959, he was assigned as commanding general, Marine Corps Base, Twentynine Palms, California. While serving in this capacity he was promoted to major general in July 1960.

In October 1960, Bowser was transferred to Headquarters Marine Corps, where he served as assistant chief of staff, G-1, and later as deputy chief of staff, plans and programs. Upon his detachment in July 1963, he served for two years as commanding general, Marine Corps Base Camp Lejeune.

Nominated for three-star rank by President Lyndon B. Johnson in March 1965, Bowser began his last active duty assignment as commanding general, Fleet Marine Force, Atlantic, with headquarters at Norfolk, Virginia, in July 1965. For service in this capacity from July 1, 1965, until June 30, 1967, he was awarded the Distinguished Service Medal. He retired from active duty on June 30, 1967.

=== Final years ===
Lieutenant General Bowser died at his home in Kailua, Hawaii, on July 13, 2003, at the age of 92. A memorial service was held for Bowser at the National Memorial Cemetery of the Pacific. His ashes are interred in San Diego, California. At the time of his death he was married to Betty Boyd Bowser (maiden name Betty Cutler)

== Awards and decorations ==
A complete list of LtGen Bowser's medals and decorations includes:

1st Row	Navy Distinguished Service Medal		Legion of Merit with two 5/16" gold stars and Combat "V"	
2nd Row	Bronze Star with one 5/16" gold star and Combat "V"	Air Medal	Navy Presidential Unit Citation with two stars	Navy Unit Commendation with two stars
3rd Row	American Defense Service Medal	American Campaign Medal	Asiatic-Pacific Campaign Medal with one 3/16 inch silver service star	World War II Victory Medal
4th Row	National Defense Service Medal with one service star	Korean Service Medal with one 3/16 inch silver service star	United Nations Korea Medal	Korean Presidential Unit Citation

== See also ==
- List of United States Marine Corps four-star generals

Military offices
Preceded by James P. Berkeley	Commanding General of Fleet Marine Force, Atlantic; July 1, 1965 - June 30, 1967	Succeeded by Richard G. Weede
Preceded by James P. Berkeley	Commanding General of the Camp Lejeune; July 1963 - June 30, 1965	Succeeded by Herman Nickerson Jr.
Preceded by Randall M. Victory	Commanding General of Marine Corps Base Twentynine Palms; December 31, 1958 - September 29, 1960	Succeeded by Lewis J. Fields

== Bibliography ==
- "Lieutenant General Alpha L. Bowser, USMC". Who's Who in the United States Marine Corps. History Division, United States Marine Corps. Archived from the original on June 15, 2011.

== Attribution ==
This article incorporates text in the public domain from the United States Marine Corps.
