= Joseph C. Burger =

U.S. Marine Corps Lieutenant General

Joseph Charles Burger
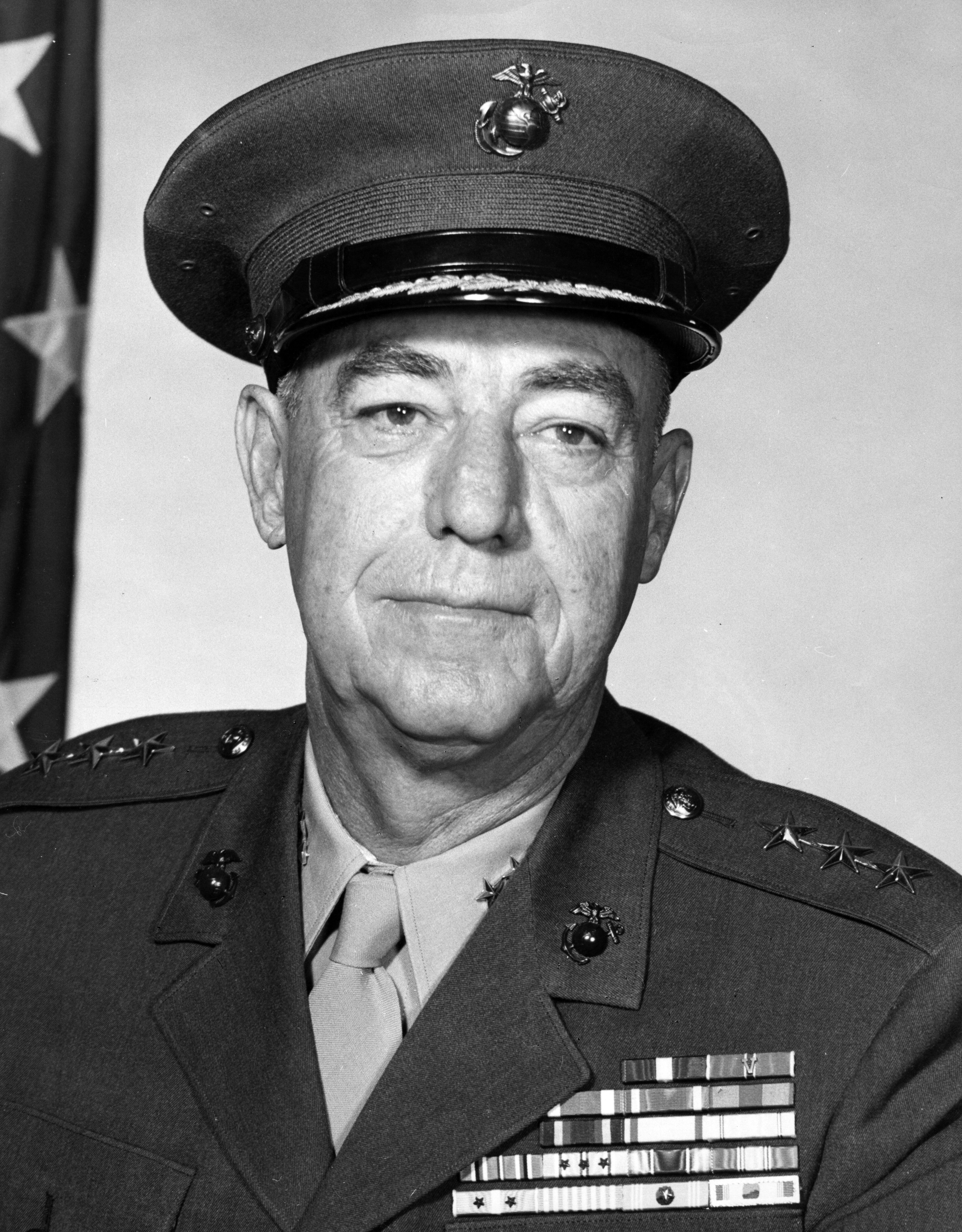
- Joseph C. Burger as LTG
- Born: May 11, 1902; Washington, D.C., U.S.
- Died: February 1, 1982 (aged 79)
- Burial place: Arlington National Cemetery
- Military career
- Allegiance: United States of America
- Branch: United States Marine Corps
- Service years: 1925–1961
- Rank: Lieutenant general
- Service number: 0-3993
- Commands: Fleet Marine Force, Atlantic; Marine Corps Reserve; MCRD Parris Island; 2nd Marine Division; 22nd Marine Regiment
- Conflicts: Yangtze Patrol; World War II: Battle of Guadalcanal; Bougainville Campaign; Korean War: Battle of the Samichon River
- Awards: Distinguished Service Medal; Bronze Star Medal; Navy Commendation Medal

Joseph Charles Burger (May 11, 1902 – February 1, 1982) was a decorated United States Marine Corps officer and college athlete. He rose to the rank of lieutenant general and concluded his career as commanding general of the Fleet Marine Force, Atlantic. Burger was also commanding general of Marine Corps Recruit Depot, Parris Island during the Ribbon Creek incident in April 1956.

According to author Keith Fleming in The U.S. Marine Corps in Crisis: Ribbon Creek and Recruit Training, Burger "enjoyed an excellent professional reputation from the very beginning of his Marine Corps service". As a captain, Burger was stationed in China, and his company won the Breckinridge Trophy for the best Marine unit deployed to that country.

== Early career ==
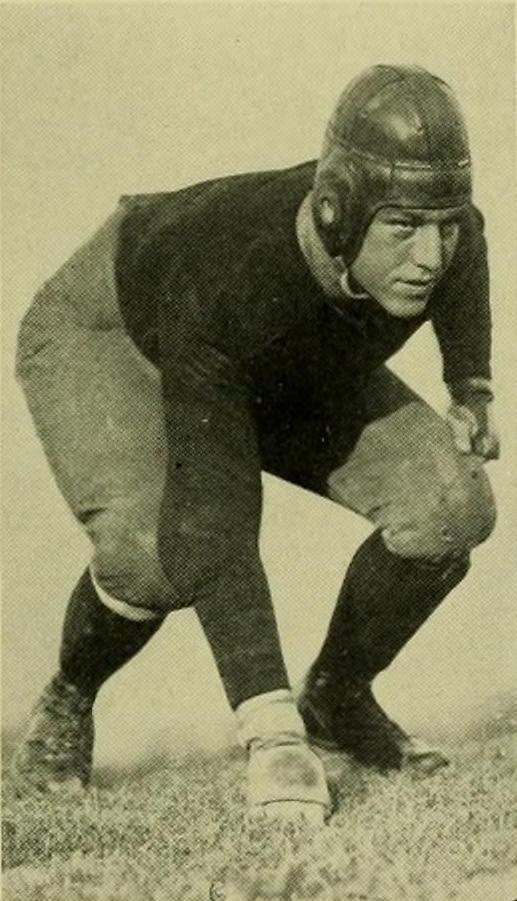
Burger while playing for University of Maryland football team

Burger was born on May 11, 1902, in Washington, D.C. and later attended the local McKinley Technology High School. Upon graduation, he enrolled the University of Maryland, where he was on several sport teams. Burger played for the football team as a tackle, and on the basketball and lacrosse teams. Burger earned varsity letters in football in 1921, 1922, 1923, and 1924, in lacrosse in 1924 and 1925, and basketball in 1924–25. During his college years, Burger also held a United States Army Reserve commission.

Following his graduation with a Bachelor of Arts degree in June 1925, Burger resigned his reserve commission in order to accept appointment as a second lieutenant in the Marine Corps on July 15. Like any other newly commissioned officer, he was sent to the Basic School at Marine Barracks Quantico, Virginia, for further officer training. While there, Burger played for the Quantico Marines football team in 1925 and 1926 and later won his letter from the Marine Corps Athletic Council.

During the summer of 1927, Burger left Quantico for expeditionary duty in Shanghai and Tianjin, China and after brief service in the Philippine Islands, he returned to the United States. Burger served on the various stations and also with the Marine detachments aboard the battleships USS Utah and USS Arizona and was promoted to the rank of first lieutenant in March 1931.

First Lieutenant Burger returned to Quantico in July 1931, when he was assigned back to Quantico Marines football team. He served as assistant coach under Captain George W. McHenry for the 1931 and 1932 seasons. Burger then remained on Quantico until the end of March 1935, when he was attached to the 4th Marine Regiment under Colonel John C. Beaumont and sailed again to China. He served as company commander in the security force of the Shanghai International Settlement and later of the guard detachment at the American embassy in Beijing. While in China, he was promoted to captain in August 1936 and during the next year, his company under his command won the Breckinridge Trophy for the best Marine unit deployed to that country.

He returned stateside in January 1938 and was assigned back to the Marine Barracks Quantico, where he remained until June 1940, when he was transferred to the Marine Corps Base San Diego, California. Burger served as an instructor there and was promoted to major in August 1940.

== World War II ==
While in San Diego, Burger was transferred to the staff of Amphibious Corps, Pacific Fleet under Major General Clayton B. Vogel. After the Japanese attack on Pearl Harbor, Burger was appointed assistant chief of staff for personnel and later promoted to lieutenant colonel in August 1942. Amphibious Corps was renamed I Marine Amphibious Corps (IMAC) at the beginning of October 1942 and subsequently left for New Caledonia in the South Pacific.

Burger participated in the offensive at Guadalcanal and in its defense and later served with IMAC under Lieutenant General Alexander Vandegrift at Bougainville in New Guinea. Burger distinguished himself and was decorated with the Bronze Star Medal with Combat "V".

When General Vandergrift was appointed Commandant of the Marine Corps at the beginning of 1944, he requested Burger for his administrative skills. Lieutenant Colonel Burger left IMAC in January 1944 and sailed for Headquarters Marine Corps in Washington, D.C., where he was appointed Military Secretary to the Commandant of the Marine Corps. He was promoted to colonel in May 1944. Burger remained in this position for the rest of the war and received the Navy Commendation Medal for his distinguished skills.

== Later military service ==
Colonel Burger finally left Washington, D.C., in July 1946 and subsequently was transferred to Guantánamo Bay, Cuba, where he assumed command of the Marine barracks within the local naval base. He was transferred stateside in June 1948 and assigned to Marine Corps Base Quantico, Virginia, where he was appointed commanding officer of the 22nd Marine Regiment, which served as a training unit for new Marine Corps officers at the Basic School. In June 1949, Burger was succeeded by Lieutenant Colonel Henry W. Buse Jr. and subsequently assumed command of the Basic School.

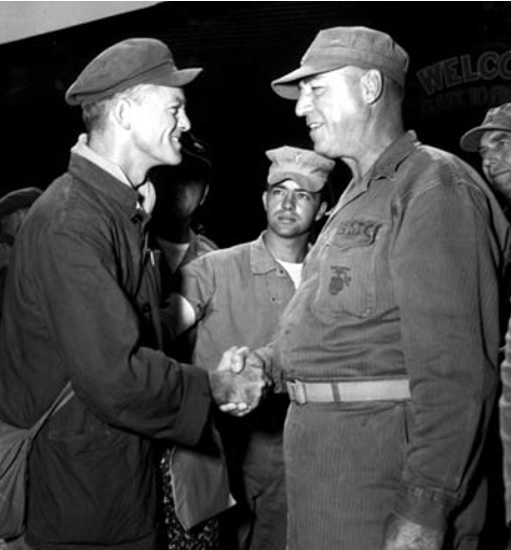
BG Joseph C. Burger welcomes Major John N. McLaughlin following his release from captivity on 5 September 1953.

When the Korean War broke out, Colonel Burger was transferred to Pearl Harbor and appointed Chief of Staff of Fleet Marine Force, Pacific under General Lemuel C. Shepherd Jr. in July 1950. He was co-responsible for all Marine units across the Pacific Ocean area, including those fighting in Korea. While in this post, Burger was promoted to the rank of brigadier general in October 1951. One month later, he was transferred to Camp Pendleton in San Diego, California, where he was appointed deputy commander and chief of staff under Major General Oliver P. Smith.

Upon the reactivation of the 3rd Marine Division at Camp Pendleton at the beginning of January 1952, Burger was appointed assistant division commander in June under the command of Major General Robert H. Pepper. General Burger was transferred to Korea at the end of March 1953 and subsequently succeeded Brigadier General Robert O. Bare as 1st Marine Division Assistant Division Commander under Major General Edwin A. Pollock. One of his first duties was participation in the prisoner exchange Operation Little Switch in April and May 1953, which led to the release of 684 U.N. prisoners.

He later participated in the fighting on the western front and later in the defense of the Demilitarized Zone under the command of new 1st Marine Division commander, Major General Randolph M. Pate, and also took part in another prisoner exchange, Operation Big Switch, in August 1953. For his service in Korea, Burger received the Navy Distinguished Service Medal.

Burger left Korea at the end of January 1954 and was appointed director of information at Headquarters Marine Corps in Washington, D.C. He was subsequently appointed director of Marine Corps Reserve in June 1954 and promoted to major general in August of the same year. Burger remained in Washington until January 1956, when he relieved his old superior, Edwin A. Pollock, as commanding general of Marine Corps Recruit Depot, Parris Island in Port Royal, South Carolina. He was the commander of that facility during the infamous Ribbon Creek incident the following month, in which a junior drill instructor conducted a forced march that resulted in the drowning deaths of six Marine recruits.

After the incident, Burger was transferred out of the command "without prejudice" and Commandant of the Marine Corps and Burger's superior from Korea, Randolph M. Pate, transferred him to Camp Lejeune, where he assumed command of the 2nd Marine Division.

He attained the rank of lieutenant general on November 1, 1959, and ended his career as commanding general, Fleet Marine Force Atlantic. Burger retired from the Marine Corps on November 1, 1961.

He died on February 1, 1982, at the age of 79. He was buried at Arlington National Cemetery with full military honors.

Burger was inducted in the inaugural class of the University of Maryland Athletic Hall of Fame in 1982.

== Decorations ==
A complete list of the general's medals and decorations include:

1st Row	Navy Distinguished Service Medal	Bronze Star Medal with Combat "V"	Navy Commendation Medal	Navy Unit Commendation
2nd Row	Marine Corps Expeditionary Medal	Yangtze Service Medal	China Service Medal	American Defense Service Medal
3rd Row	American Campaign Medal	Asiatic-Pacific Campaign Medal with three service stars	World War II Victory Medal	National Defense Service Medal with one star
4th Row	Korean Service Medal with two service stars	United Nations Korea Medal	Order of Military Merit, Ulchi Medal with Silver Star	Korean Presidential Unit Citation

Military offices
Preceded by Edwin A. Pollock	Commanding General of the Fleet Marine Force Atlantic; 1 November 1959 – 1 November 1961	Succeeded by Robert B. Luckey
Preceded by Reginald H. Ridgely Jr.	Commanding General of the 2nd Marine Division; 3 June 1957 – 24 October 1959	Succeeded by Odell M. Conoley
Preceded by Edwin A. Pollock	Commanding General of Marine Corps Recruit Depot Parris Island; 15 January 1956 – 11 May 1956	Succeeded by Homer Litzenberg
