= Tenaru River =

River in the Solomon Islands

Coordinates: 9°25′51.04″S 160°05′45.41″E

Tenaru

Location
- Country: Solomon Islands

Physical characteristics
- Source
  - location: Guadalcanal
- Mouth
  - location: Savo Sound
- Discharge
  - location: mouth

The Tenaru is the name of a river on the northern coast of Guadalcanal with a tributary at Ironbottom Sound (called Savo Sound prior to World War II). During World War II, it was the site for the Battle of the Tenaru River.
