= Randolph M. Pate =

United States Marine Corps general

Randolph McCall Pate
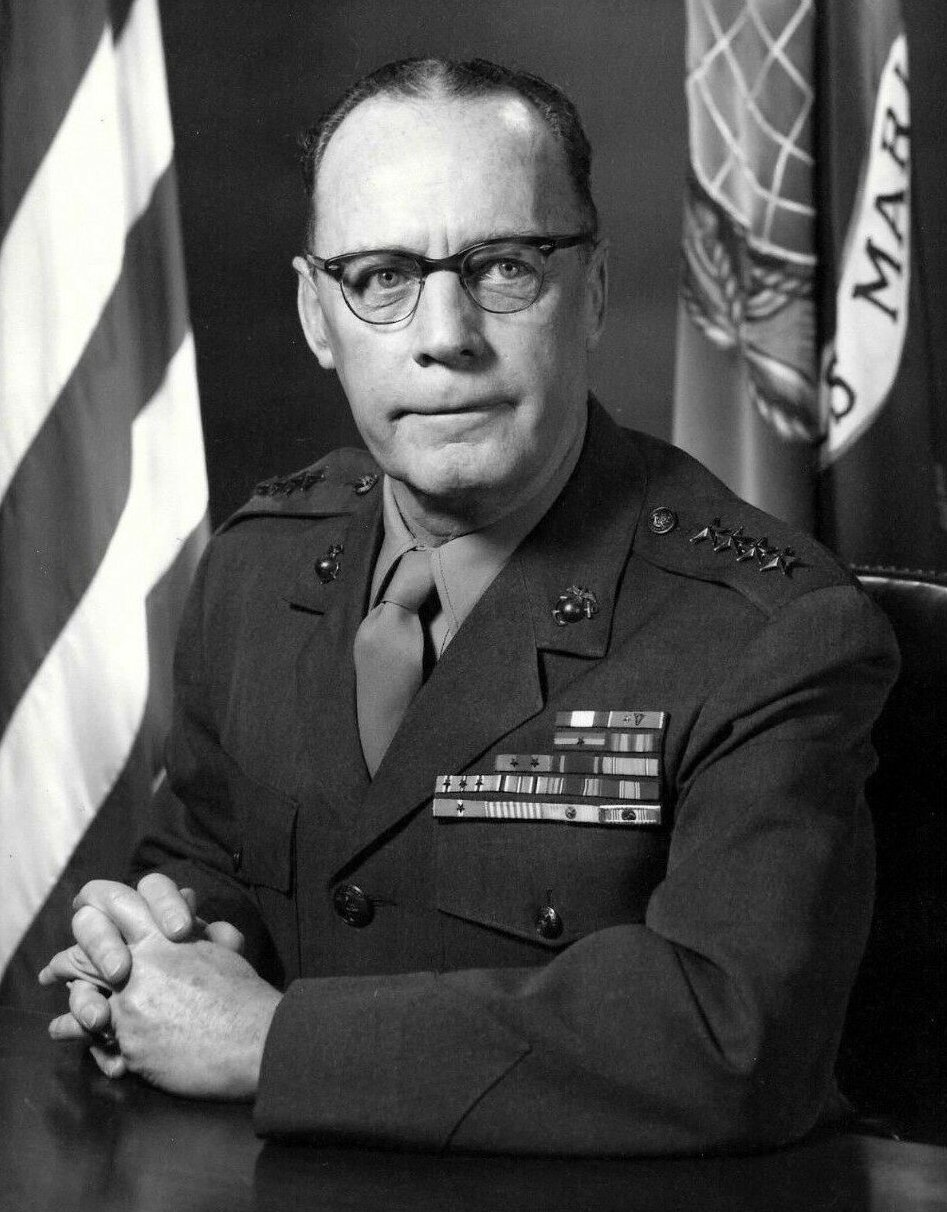
- General Randolph M. Pate
- Born: February 11, 1898; Port Royal, South Carolina, U.S.
- Died: July 31, 1961 (aged 63); National Naval Medical Center, Bethesda, Maryland, U.S.
- Burial place: Arlington National Cemetery
- Military career
- Allegiance: United States of America
- Branch: United States Marine Corps
- Service years: 1918–1959
- Rank: General
- Commands: Commandant of the Marine Corps; 2nd Marine Division; 1st Marine Division; Marine Corps Reserve
- Conflicts: Banana Wars: Occupation of the Dominican Republic; World War II: Battle of Guadalcanal; Battle of Iwo Jima
- Awards: Navy Distinguished Service Medal; Army Distinguished Service Medal; Legion of Merit (2); Purple Heart

Randolph McCall Pate (February 11, 1898 – July 31, 1961) was a United States Marine Corps general who served as the 21st Commandant of the Marine Corps from 1956 to 1959.

Pate was a veteran of World War II, seeing action at Guadalcanal and Iwo Jima, and later served in Korea, and pre-war expeditionary service in Santo Domingo and China.

== Early years ==
Pate was born at Port Royal, South Carolina, on February 11, 1898. After a brief tour of enlisted service with the United States Army in 1918, he entered the Virginia Military Institute, graduating in June 1921, with a Bachelor of Arts degree. He was commissioned a second lieutenant in the Marine Corps Reserve that September, and the following May accepted his commission in the Regular Marine Corps.

== Military career ==
In addition to expeditionary duty in Santo Domingo in 1923 and 1924 and in China from 1927 to 1929, Pate served at various post in the United States and Hawaii. He was promoted to first lieutenant in September 1926, to captain in November 1934, and to major in October 1938. In the spring of 1939, he became assistant chief of staff for supply, 1st Marine Division, at New River (later Camp Lejeune), North Carolina, and while there was promoted to lieutenant colonel in January 1942. He began his World War II service in this capacity, participating in the planning and combat phases of the Guadalcanal campaign. Pate was succeeded by Lieutenant Colonel Raymond P. Coffman on October 21, 1942. He was promoted to colonel in December 1943, and later saw further service in the Pacific area.

In World War II, General Holland M. Smith awarded Pate the Legion of Merit for outstanding service as deputy chief of staff to the commanding general, Fleet Marine Force, Pacific. Serving in that capacity from September 11, 1944, to November 1, 1945, Pate, then a colonel, was cited in particular for his performance of duty during amphibious operations on Palau, Iwo Jima and Okinawa.

In 1947, General Alexander A. Vandegrift, then Commandant of the Marine Corps, presented Pate a Gold Star in lieu of a second Legion of Merit. The award was for exceptionally meritorious service at Guadalcanal as assistant chief of staff for supply of the 1st Marine Division during the United States' first offensive against Japan.

Returning to the United States after the war, Pate was named director of the Division of Reserve at Marine Corps Headquarters in January 1946. The following year he assumed duties as a member of the Navy General Board. In July 1948, he became chief of staff of the Marine Corps Schools, Quantico, Virginia, and two years later was named director of the Marine Corps Educational Center. While stationed at Quantico in September 1949, he was promoted to brigadier general.

In July 1951, Pate was assigned to the Office of the Joint Chiefs of Staff, where he served as deputy director of the Joint Staff for logistic Plans. He was named director of the Marine Corps Reserves for a second time that November, and in August 1952 was promoted to major general. The following month, he took command of the 2nd Marine Division at Camp Lejeune. Ordered to Korea in June 1953, he commanded the 1st Marine Division until May 1954, earning him the Army Distinguished Service Medal and the Republic of Korea's Order of Military Merit Taiquk.

In July 1954, Pate was appointed assistant commandant of the Marine Corps and chief of staff, serving in that capacity with the rank of lieutenant general for eighteen months. On January 1, 1956, he was promoted to the rank of general and executed the oath of office as Commandant of the Marine Corps, succeeding General Lemuel C. Shepherd. Following four years as commandant, he retired with the rank of general. At his retirement ceremonies, December 31, 1959, Pate was awarded the Navy Distinguished Service Medal for "exceptionally meritorious service to the Government of the United States in a duty of great responsibility as Commandant of the Marine Corps from January 1, 1956 to December 31, 1959."

== Post-military ==
Following a brief illness, Pate died at the U.S. Naval Hospital, Bethesda, Maryland, July 31, 1961. Funeral services were held on August 3, 1961, in the Fort Myer Chapel, Arlington, Virginia, and he was interred with full military honors in Arlington National Cemetery.

Pate's wife, Mary Elizabeth Bunting Pate (July 4, 1899 – December 31, 1975), whom he married on July 2, 1926, is buried with him.

== Honors and awards ==
Pate's medals and decorations include:

1st Row	Navy Distinguished Service Medal		Army Distinguished Service Medal	
2nd Row	Legion of Merit with one Gold Star and Combat V	Purple Heart	Presidential Unit Citation with one star	Navy Unit Commendation
3rd Row	World War I Victory Medal	Marine Corps Expeditionary Medal with two service stars	Yangtze Service Medal	American Defense Service Medal
4th Row	American Campaign Medal	Asiatic-Pacific Campaign Medal with three service stars	World War II Victory Medal	National Defense Service Medal
5th Row	Korean Service Medal with one service star	Order of National Security Merit, Gugseon with bronze star	Korean Presidential Unit Citation with service star	United Nations Korea Medal

The citation for his Distinguished Service Medal states, in part:

Moving the 1st Marine Division from corps reserve to position on line shortly after he assumed control of the 1st Marine Division, he was responsible for a sector that was far greater in size than is normally the area of responsibility for a division. He employed the most astute military judgment and discretion in the deployment of his troops, and was able to contain the enemy and maintain the integrity of the United Nations line during the final enemy offensive. Subsequent to the armistice agreement, he initiated an intensive salvage program of the old battle position, realizing a savings of thousands of dollars for the command, and then personally supervised and guided the construction of new main battle positions, again on a greatly extended front. Aware of the necessity for maintaining combat readiness throughout the post armistice period, he implemented an aggressive, realistic and comprehensive training program of dual purpose consisting of orientation and indoctrination in the battle techniques of both ground warfare and amphibious assault operations. In addition, he cooperated and coordinated with interest units during the unprecedented "Big Switch" prisoner of war exchange. This sensitive project fell within the Division area of responsibility, and through his foresight and organizational process, the repatriation program was completed without any untoward incidents.

Military offices
Preceded by Franklin A. Hart	Director of the Marine Corps Reserve; 1946–1948	Succeeded by William T. Clement
Preceded by Edward A. Craig	Director of the Marine Corps Reserve; 1951–1952	Succeeded by John C. McQueen
Preceded by Edwin A. Pollock	Commander of the 2nd Marine Division; 1952–1953	Succeeded by Robert E. Hogaboom
Preceded by Edwin A. Pollock	Commander of the 1st Marine Division; 1953–1954	Succeeded by Robert H. Pepper
Preceded by Gerald C. Thomas	Assistant Commandant of the Marine Corps; 1954–1955	Succeeded by Vernon E. Megee
Preceded by Lemuel C. Shepherd, Jr.	Commandant of the Marine Corps; 1956–1959	Succeeded by David M. Shoup
