= William P. Upshur =

United States Marine Corps general and Medal of Honor recipient

William Peterkin Upshur
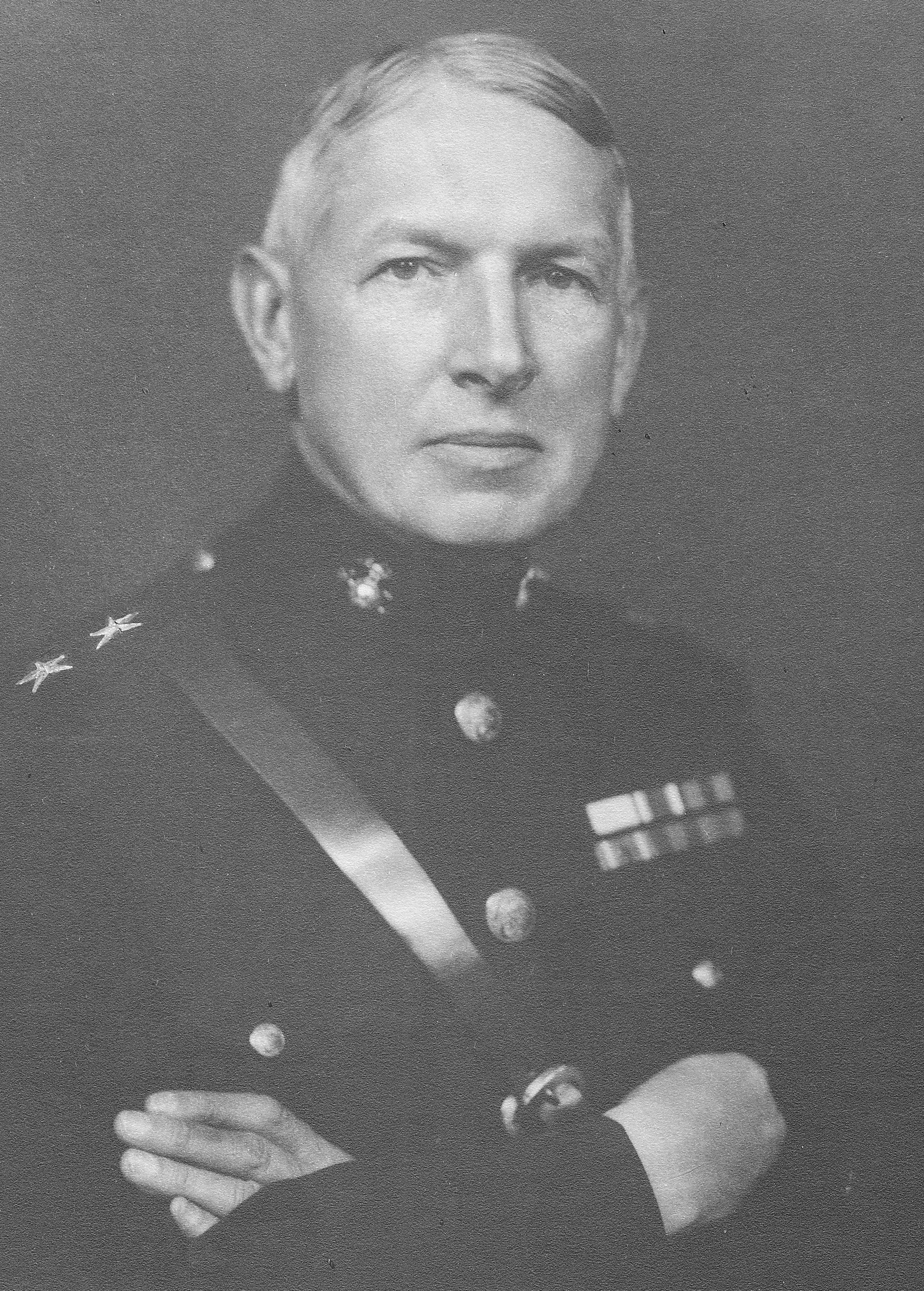
- Upshur c. 1942
- Born: October 28, 1881; Richmond, Virginia, U.S.
- Died: July 21, 1943 (aged 61) near Sitka, Alaska, U.S.
- Burial place: United States Naval Academy, Annapolis, Maryland
- Military career
- Allegiance: United States of America
- Branch: United States Marine Corps
- Service years: 1904–1943
- Rank: Major general
- Unit: 2nd Marine Regiment
- Commands: Marine Corps Schools; Marine Corps Reserve; Marine Corps Base San Diego; Department of the Pacific
- Conflicts: Haitian Campaign; World War I World War II
- Awards: Medal of Honor; Purple Heart

Major General William Peterkin Upshur (October 28, 1881 – July 21, 1943) was a United States Marine Corps officer and the recipient of the Medal of Honor, the United States' highest military decoration, for his actions in 1915 during the Haitian Campaign.

== Biography ==
William Upshur was born October 28, 1881, in Richmond, Virginia, and graduated from the Virginia Military Institute (VMI) in 1902.

After graduating from VMI he was appointed a second lieutenant in the United States Marine Corps on February 1, 1904, and subsequently served aboard several vessels of the United States Navy, at foreign stations throughout the world, and at various posts and stations in the United States.

His foreign shore duty included service with an expeditionary force to Havana, Cuba, in October 1906, and duty at Camp Evans, Deer Point, Guantanamo, Cuba, from January 9, to February 8, 1907. He again was detailed to expeditionary duty with a force of Marines on the Isthmus of Panama from June 19, to August 8, 1908. Arriving at Olongapo, Philippine Islands, in January 1912, he joined the 1st Brigade of Marines and was again detached in February 1914, this time to the Marine detachment, American Legation, Peking, China, where he served until October 16, 1914.

On August 4, 1915, he assumed command of the 15th Company, 2nd Regiment, Port-au-Prince, Haiti, where he participated in engagements against Haitian rebels known as cacos. Decorations earned during this deployment included the Haitian Campaign Medal and the Marine Corps Expeditionary Medal. For his bravery during a six day mission against the cacos, he was awarded the Medal of Honor. He was one of six men, including Smedley Butler to receive the Medal of Honor for actions during the occupation of Haiti.

When the United States entered World War I in April 1917, he was again detailed for foreign shore duty, this time with the 13th Regiment in France from September 1918 to August 1919, during which time he was in command of the American Military Prison, Casino des Lilas, Bordeaux and the American Guard Camp.

He was on temporary duty at the Naval Station, Saint Thomas, U.S. Virgin Islands, in July and August 1921. He also served in Haiti for a period of two years with the 1st Brigade of Marines, from 1922 to 1924. In January and March 1929, he was on temporary duty as chief umpire, Fleet Training Exercise No. 5, Culebra, Puerto Rico, and again in January, February, and March 1940. In September 1939 he was assigned to the Marine Corps Base, San Diego, California. In addition to his foreign shore stations he served aboard the USS Maine (BB-10), USS Kearsarge (BB-5), USS Rainbow (AS-7), USS Buffalo (AD-8) and the USS California (BB-44).

Other duties consisted of Commandant of the Marine Corps Schools at the Marine Barracks, Quantico, Virginia; director of the Marine Corps Reserve; on duty with the War Plans Division, Office of the Chief of Naval Operations, Navy Department; and as commanding general of the Marine Corps Base in San Diego. During his time as director of the Marine Corps Reserve he was responsible for raising the readiness of the Fleet Marine Corps Reserve units to a high level.

He was a graduate of the Marine Corps School of Application, the Army Command and General Staff School, Fort Leavenworth, Kansas, and of the Army War College and the Naval War College.

His last station of duty was that of the Department of the Pacific, where he served as commanding general with headquarters in San Francisco, California, from January 1, 1942, until the time of his death.

Major General Upshur died from injuries suffered in a July 21, 1943, airplane crash near Sitka, Alaska, while on an inspection tour of his command, which included Alaska and the Hawaiian Islands. In September 1948, his remains were removed from his Alaskan burial plot and reinterred at the United States Naval Academy at Annapolis, Maryland.

== Honors and awards ==
A partial list of Upshur's awards includes:

	Medal of Honor	Purple Heart	
Marine Corps Expeditionary Medal	Cuban Pacification Medal	Philippine Campaign Medal	China Service Medal
Haitian Campaign Medal (1917)	World War I Victory Medal	Army of Occupation of Germany Medal	Haitian Campaign Medal (1921)

=== Medal of Honor citation ===
Citation:

In company with members of the 15th Company of Marines all mounted, Capt. Upshur left Fort Liberte, Haiti, for a six-day reconnaissance. After dark on the evening of 24 October 1915, while crossing the river in a deep ravine, the detachment was suddenly fired upon from three sides by about 400 Cacos concealed in bushes about 100 yards from the fort. The marine detachment fought its way forward to a good position, which it maintained during the night, although subjected to a continuous fire from the Cacos. At daybreak, Capt. Upshur, in command of the three squads which advanced in three different directions, led his men forward, surprising and scattering the Cacos, and aiding the capture of Fort Dipitie.

=== Other honors ===
Camp Upshur, dedicated to Medal of Honor recipient General William P. Upshur, is a training area in Virginia aboard Marine Corps Base Quantico. It became the official location of the Basic School in 1947 and remained in that capacity until 1958. It was utilized by the Officer Candidate School until 1987 and is now a training area for Marine Reserve units, the Naval Academy's Leatherneck summer course, The Marine Corps Summer Leadership and Character Development Academy, and various other programs. It also serves as the home of a reserve LAR unit.

The USNS Upshur (T-AP-198), a troop and dependent transport which was placed into service with the Military Sea Transportation Service (MSTS) during the Korean War, was named in his honor.

== See also ==
- List of Medal of Honor recipients

Military offices
Preceded by Charles F. B. Price	Commanding General, Department of the Pacific; 1942–1943	Succeeded by John Marston
Preceded by Louis M. Little	Commanding General, Fleet Marine Force; 1939–1941	Succeeded by Clayton B. Vogel
Preceded by Richard P. Williams	Director, Marine Corps Reserve; 1937–1939	Succeeded by William C. James
