= Henry D. Linscott =

US Marine Corps general (1894–1973)

Henry Dallas Linscott
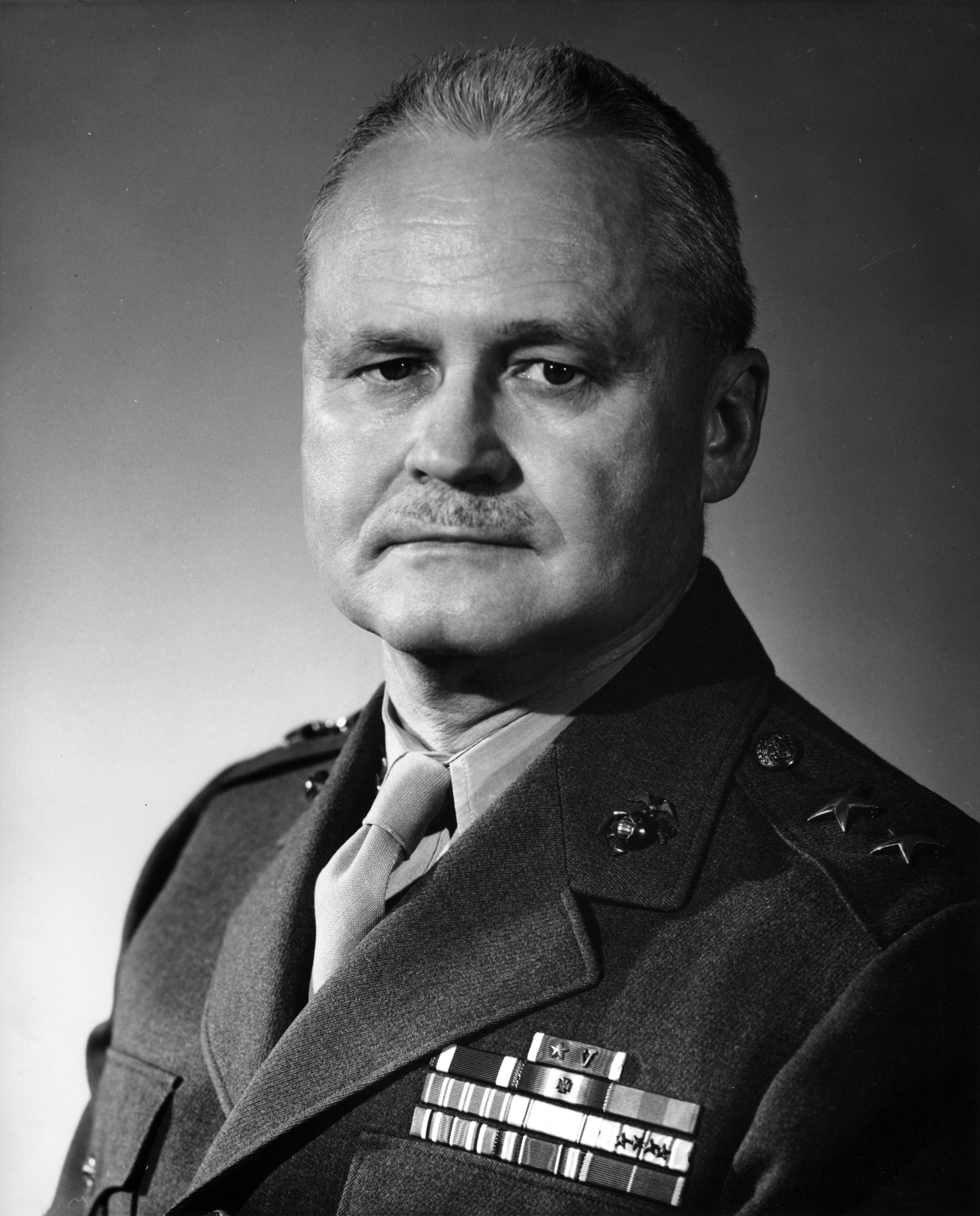
- Henry D. Linscott as Major general
- Born: September 3, 1894; Milford, Kansas, US
- Died: October 17, 1973 (aged 79); Alameda, California, US
- Burial place: Arlington National Cemetery
- Military career
- Allegiance: United States of America
- Branch: United States Marine Corps
- Service years: 1917–1955
- Rank: Lieutenant general
- Nickname: "Dal"
- Service number: 0-558
- Commands: Department of the Pacific; Camp Lejeune; Marine Garrison Forces, Pacific
- Conflicts: World War I Dominican Campaign; Nicaraguan Campaign; World War II: Solomon Islands campaign; New Georgia Campaign; Bougainville Campaign; Battle of Empress Augusta Bay; Gilbert and Marshall Islands campaign
- Awards: Legion of Merit (2); Navy Commendation Medal

Henry Dallas Linscott (September 3, 1894 – October 17, 1973) was a decorated officer of the United States Marine Corps with the rank of lieutenant general. He is most noted for his service on the staff of Amphibious Force Commander, Admiral Richmond K. Turner during World War II and later as the commanding general of the Department of the Pacific and Camp Lejeune.

== Early career ==
Henry D. Linscott was born on September 3, 1894, in the town of Milford, Kansas, the son of local postmaster Melvin C. Linscott and his wife Mary Ellen. His father served in the 74th Pennsylvania Infantry of the Union Army during the American Civil War and was discharged with the rank of captain. Following graduation from high school, Linscott enrolled in Kansas State Agricultural College from which he graduated in summer 1916 with a Bachelor of Science degree in electrical engineering. During his university years, Linscott was a member of the Army Reserve Officers' Training Corps, in which he was commissioned a second lieutenant, in April 1914.

After graduation from college, Linscott lived and worked in Texas for a period of time before enlisting in the United States Marine Corps on May 9, 1917. He was commissioned second lieutenant on the same date and posted to the 29th Company, 4th Provisional Regiment, and spent next four months in training at the Marine Barracks in Quantico, Virginia. Linscott sailed with his regiment for his first expeditionary duty to Santo Domingo in November 1917, having been promoted to first lieutenant, and took part in the skirmishes with the rebel forces under the command of Ramón Natera.

Linscott returned to the United States in August 1918 and the following month married Stella May Rich (1896–1989). He was posted to the Officer Training Camp at Marine Barracks Quantico, completing the training two months later and receiving a promotion to the rank of captain. He subsequently sailed for France and following his arrival in October 1918, he was appointed commander of the 65th Marine Guard Company in St. Nazaire. Linscott was transferred to the 11th Marine Regiment in July 1919 and sailed back to the States as commander of Company D.

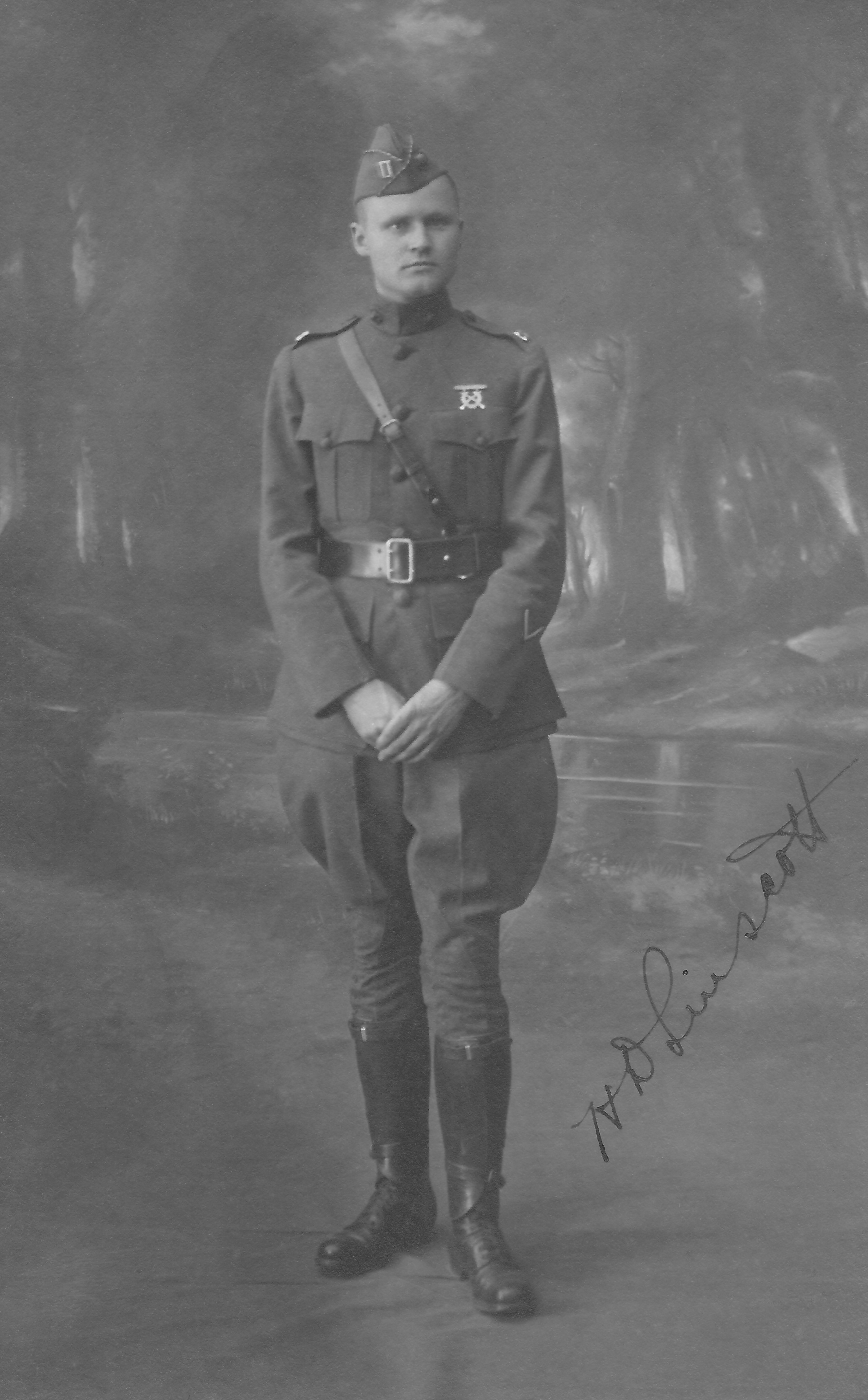
Linscott, shown here as a captain in France

Linscott served back at Quantico until October 1919 and was then attached to the Radio School Detachment at Marine Barracks Parris Island, South Carolina. He remained in that capacity until August 1922, when he sailed again to Santo Domingo for service with 2nd Marine Brigade under Brigadier General Harry Lee. During his second tour of duty in the Dominican Republic, he was posted to the headquarters company of the 1st Marine Regiment until July 1924 and was subsequently transferred to the Marine barracks at Naval Station Guantanamo Bay as commanding officer of Headquarters Company, 3rd Battalion, 6th Marine Regiment.

In November 1924, Linscott was ordered to the Marine Corps Base San Diego for service as the base quartermaster and later as the executive officer of the Recruit Depot. He was detached from San Diego in September 1927 in order to attend a training course for company officers at Quantico. Linscott graduated in March 1928 and was appointed commander of 58th Company, 3rd Battalion, 11th Marine Regiment under the command of Colonel Robert H. Dunlap. He sailed with the regiment to León, Nicaragua and participated in jungle patrols against Sandino rebels. Linscott was later transferred to command 60th Company, 3rd Battalion in Puerto Cabezas and finally was attached to 2nd Brigade Headquarters under Brigadier General Logan Feland in Managua. He later served as an instructor and executive officer of the Eastern Area, Guardia Nacional de Nicaragua.

Upon his return to the United States in August 1930, Linscott assumed duties with the Office of the Judge Advocate General of the Navy in Washington, D.C., and enrolled in the George Washington University Law School, earning a law degree in June 1933. He was subsequently appointed commander of Headquarters & Service Battery of 1st Battalion, 10th Marines at the Marine barracks in Quantico and remained in that capacity until April 1934, when he was appointed assistant operations officer with Headquarters & Headquarters Company, Fleet Marine Force under the command of Major General Charles H. Lyman at Coco Solo in the Panama Canal Zone. Linscott was also promoted to the rank of major during that time.

Linscott later moved with that command to San Diego and served as Force Operations Officer until June 1936, when he was appointed Division Marine Officer, Battleship Division One, Battle Force under Vice Admiral William D. Leahy. He was promoted to the rank of lieutenant colonel in May 1938 and left for duty in Washington in 1941.

== World War II ==
Linscott was appointed Operations and training officer on the staff of Amphibious Force, Atlantic Fleet under Major General Holland Smith and promoted to the rank of colonel in October 1941. Following the entry of the United States into the World War II, Linscott was ordered for duty to the South Pacific in June 1942 and attached to the staff of commander, Amphibious Force South Pacific under Vice Admiral Richmond K. Turner. Linscott was appointed assistant chief of staff and took part in several major campaigns in the Solomon Islands, New Georgia, Bougainville and the Gilbert and Marshall Islands. He remained on Turner's staff following the redesignation of Amphibious Force South Pacific to the Third Amphibious Force and distinguished himself in that capacity. He later received two awards of the Legion of Merit for his service.

His official citation reads:

For exceptionally meritorious conduct in the performance of outstanding service to the Government of the United States while serving as Assistant Chief of Staff to the Commander, Amphibious Forces, South Pacific from August, 1942, to July, 1943, and as Assistant Chief of Staff to the Commander, Third Amphibious Force, from July, 1943, to March, 1944, Colonel Linscott was awarded the Legion of Merit and a Gold Star in lieu of a second Legion of Merit. Participating in the initial occupation of Guadalcanal-Tulagi, Colonel Linscott also took part in all subsequent phases of the Solomon Islands campaign, including the seizure of the Russell Islands and the assault on New Georgia. Despite frequent Japanese air attacks and bombardments by hostile shore batteries, he carried out his highly important assignments under the most difficult conditions, thereby contributing in a large measure to the success of our forces in that vital area.

Linscott was ordered back to the United States in April 1944 and assumed duties as chief of staff, Troop Training Unit, Amphibious Training Command, Pacific Fleet at Coronado in California. He served under Brigadier General Harry K. Pickett and was partially responsible for the amphibious training of several Marine Corps units, including 5th Marine Division. He was later commended for his service at Coronado with the receipt of the Navy Commendation Medal. Linscott was also appointed an Honorary Commander of the Order of the British Empire for his service in Pacific and Coronado.

== Later service ==
In September 1945, Linscott was ordered to Hawaii and appointed commander of 6th Service Depot, Service Command of Fleet Marine Force, Pacific (FMFPac) under Brigadier General Merritt A. Edson. His unit was responsible for the supply, salvage, evacuation, construction, personnel management, quartering and sanitation needs of FMFPac units and others marine units in its area.

He was promoted to the rank of brigadier general in February 1947 and assumed duties as commander of the Marine Garrison Forces, Pacific. Linscott was transferred to Camp Lejeune in September of that year and appointed chief of staff and deputy commander.

In April 1949, Linscott was transferred to Washington, D.C. and appointed Marine Corps Liaison officer in the Office of the Chief of Naval Operations under Admiral Louis E. Denfeld. He continued in this capacity when Admiral Forrest Sherman took over from Denfeld and following a promotion to the rank of major general in July 1951, he was appointed director of the Landing Force Development Center at Quantico.

Linscott was appointed commander of Camp Lejeune in August 1952, but after less than a year was given command of the Department of the Pacific. He spent the following two years dealing with the training and administration of Marine units along the West Coast and retired from the Marine Corps after 38 years of active service on September 30, 1955. He was advanced to the rank of lieutenant general for having been specially commended in combat.

Linscott died on October 17, 1973, in Alameda in California and is buried at Arlington National Cemetery in Virginia, alongside a daughter who predeceased him. After her death in 1989, his wife was interred alongside him. Linscott also had a son, Henry D. Linscott Jr. who served in the United States Navy and was posted to the staff of Admiral Turner at the same time as his father; he retired as a captain in 1968.

== Decorations ==
Here is the ribbon bar of Lieutenant General Henry D. Linscott:

1st Row	Legion of Merit with Combat "V" one 5/16" Gold Star		Navy Commendation Medal
2nd Row	World War I Victory Medal with Maltese cross	Marine Corps Expeditionary Medal	Second Nicaraguan Campaign Medal
3rd Row	American Defense Service Medal	Asiatic-Pacific Campaign Medal with four 3/16 inch service stars	American Campaign Medal
4th Row	World War II Victory Medal	National Defense Service Medal	Honorary Commander of the Order of the British Empire

== See also ==
- Solomon Islands campaign

Military offices
Preceded by Ray A. Robinson	Commanding General of the Department of the Pacific; June 1, 1953 – September 30, 1955	Succeeded by Robert H. Pepper
