= George F. Good Jr. =

U.S. Marine Corps Lieutenant General

George Franklin Good Jr.
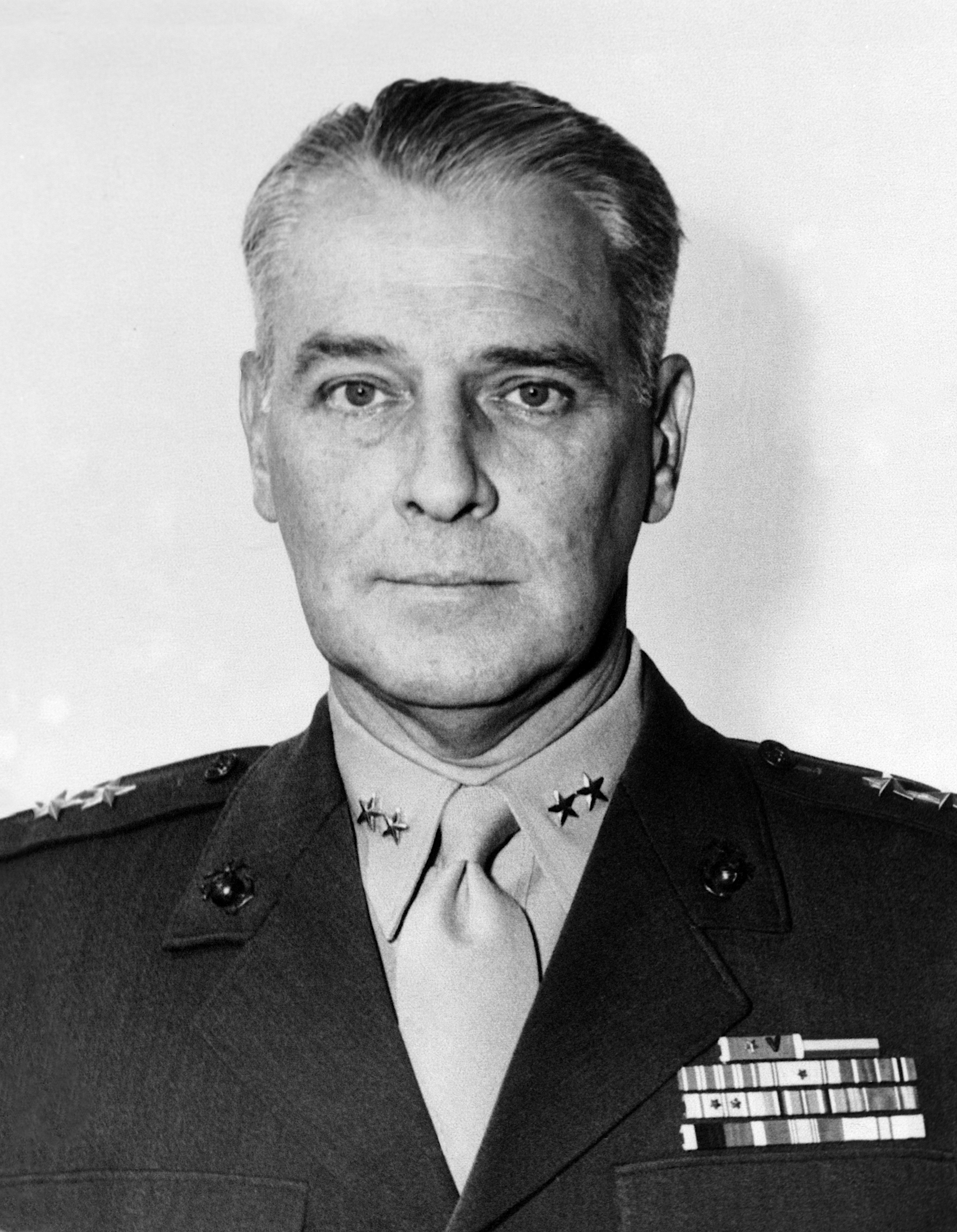
- MG George F. Good Jr., USMC
- Born: September 16, 1901; Philadelphia, Pennsylvania, US
- Died: October 25, 1991 (aged 90); Harlingen, Texas, US
- Burial place: United States Naval Academy Cemetery
- Military career
- Allegiance: United States
- Branch: United States Marine Corps
- Service years: 1923–1958
- Rank: Lieutenant general
- Nickname: "Frank" or "Goody"
- Service number: 0-3847
- Commands: Department of the Pacific; Camp Pendleton; 2nd Marine Division the Basic School; 5th Defense Battalion; 4th Defense Battalion
- Conflicts: Nicaraguan Campaign; World War II: Occupation of Iceland; Defense of Funafuti; Battle of Saipan; Battle of Okinawa
- Awards: Legion of Merit (2)

George Franklin Good Jr. (September 16, 1901 – October 25, 1991) was a decorated officer of the United States Marine Corps with the rank of lieutenant general. Good is most noted for his service as commander of the Marine Defense Force of Funafuti during World War II and later as commanding general of Department of the Pacific.

== Early life ==
George F. Good Jr. was born on September 16, 1901, in Philadelphia, Pennsylvania, as the son of station agent for Pennsylvania Railroad, George F. Good and his wife Clara. He spent his childhood in near St. Davids, Pennsylvania and after graduation from high school, George Jr. received appointment to the United States Naval Academy at Annapolis, Maryland. While at Academy, Good was a member of Lacrosse team and was appointed a Commissary of 4th Midshipmen Battalion. He graduated with bachelor's degree on June 7, 1923, and was commissioned second lieutenant in the Marine Corps on the same date. While at Academy, he met his future wife Jessie, who was a daughter of Navy Captain Daniel M. Garrison, head of Department of Mathematics.

Many of his classmates became general officers later: Arleigh Burke, Harry D. Felt, Merrill B. Twining, Charles F. Coe, John B. Moss, Frederick Moosbrugger, Stanhope C. Ring, Thomas B. Williamson, William D. Anderson, Murr E. Arnold, John G. Crommelin, Paul F. Dugan, William H. Hamilton, Francis M. Hughes, Joseph L. Kane, William G. Manley, Henry G. Moran, Richard M. Oliver, Edwin R. Peck, John V. Peterson, William T. Rassieur, William J. Scheyer, Francis E. Shoup Jr., Curtis S. Smiley, Frederick C. Stelter Jr., Frank D. Weir, Ralph W.D. Woods, Howard L. Young, Richard M. Cutts Jr., Samuel G. Fuqua, Ira L. Kimes, Merlin F. Schneider, Frank H. Lamson-Scribner or Henry A. Schade.

Following his graduation, Good was sent to the Basic School at Philadelphia Navy Yard for further Officers' training and subsequently went to Nicaragua for his first expeditionary duties. He took part in the jungle patrols and combat against rebel militants under Augusto César Sandino and received the Nicaraguan Cross of Valor with Diploma by the Government of Nicaragua.

In 1934, Good was appointed aide-de-camp to the Commandant of the Marine Corps, John H. Russell Jr. and served in that capacity during his whole tenure until the end of November 1936. In January 1937, he was appointed commanding officer of the Marine detachment aboard the battleship USS Pennsylvania and took part in several Caribbean maneuvers.

== World War II ==
At the beginning of February 1940, Good was sent as major to Marine Barracks Parris Island and tasked with the activation of 4th Defense Battalion. His battalion consisted of the batteries with 5"/51 caliber guns, searchlight and aircraft sound locator and antiaircraft groups with M2 Browning and M1917 Browning machine guns and were ideal for the defense of the islands from the attack from the sea and air.

Good was relieved in command of the battalion by Colonel Lloyd L. Leech in April 1940 and reassigned as battalion executive officer. With the activation of the 5th Defense Battalion in December 1940, Colonel Leech – new commanding officer, requested Good as his executive officer. During May 1941, Good was ordered to England and appointed assistant naval attache at U.S. Embassy in London. He was later on a secret mission, along with some navy civil engineers, to tour four base sites, two in Scotland and two in Northern Ireland, and to advise the Marine Corps and the navy as to their security requirements.

He rejoined 5th Defense Battalion in late 1941 as operations officer, but the unit had meanwhile been ordered to Iceland for defense of the island against the German Army. Good again served as battalion executive officer and sailed with his unit to the South Pacific in July 1942. Good was stationed in Noumea, New Caledonia and several batteries and platoons were detached from 5th Defense Battalion in August 1942 in order to deploy to Tulagi.

Good remained in Noumea and was put in charge of what was left: the battalion headquarters and command echelon with the remainder of the 5th, reinforced by two hastily formed and unorganized companies of infantry from 3rd Marines, a company of Seabees from Samoa, plus some miscellaneous personnel including a tank platoon. This mixed unit then made an unopposed amphibious landing on the atoll of Funafuti, Ellice Islands on October 2, 1942. Good would later remark that the mixed force was "poorly armed" and "stuck out like a sore thumb".

His unit was redesignated "Defense Force Funafuti" and Good, who had meanwhile been promoted to the rank of colonel, was tasked with the defense of the atoll against air and land attack and also provided cover for the units constructing the landing field. Funafuti was under repeated aerial attacks of Japanese fighter planes, but Good and his unit successfully defended the island from 10 Japanese air attacks. The landing field later served as base for 7th Air Force Bomber Command during the Battle of Tarawa in late 1943. Additionally, the field organized and executed the search for Eddie Rickenbacker, a World War I fighter ace who had been at sea after a plane crash for 24 days.

Officially, Good was appointed commanding officer of 5th Defense Battalion in November 1942 and remained on Funafuti until December 1943, when he was relieved by Lieutenant Colonel Willis E. Hicks. For his service on Funafuti, Good was decorated with the Legion of Merit with Combat "V".

Colonel Good was transferred to the staff of 2nd Marine Division under Major General Thomas E. Watson on October 11, 1944, and relieved Colonel David M. Shoup as Divisional Chief of Staff. The division was located on Saipan and participated in the mopping-up operations. Good later took part in the Battle of Okinawa in April 1945, but his division remained in reserve.

Good remained with Second Division and took part in the Occupation of Japan, following the Surrender of Japan on September 2, 1945. During occupation duties in Japan, Second Marine Division was stationed mainly on Kyushu Island. For his service as chief of staff, Good was decorated with his second Legion of Merit with Combat "V".

== Later career ==
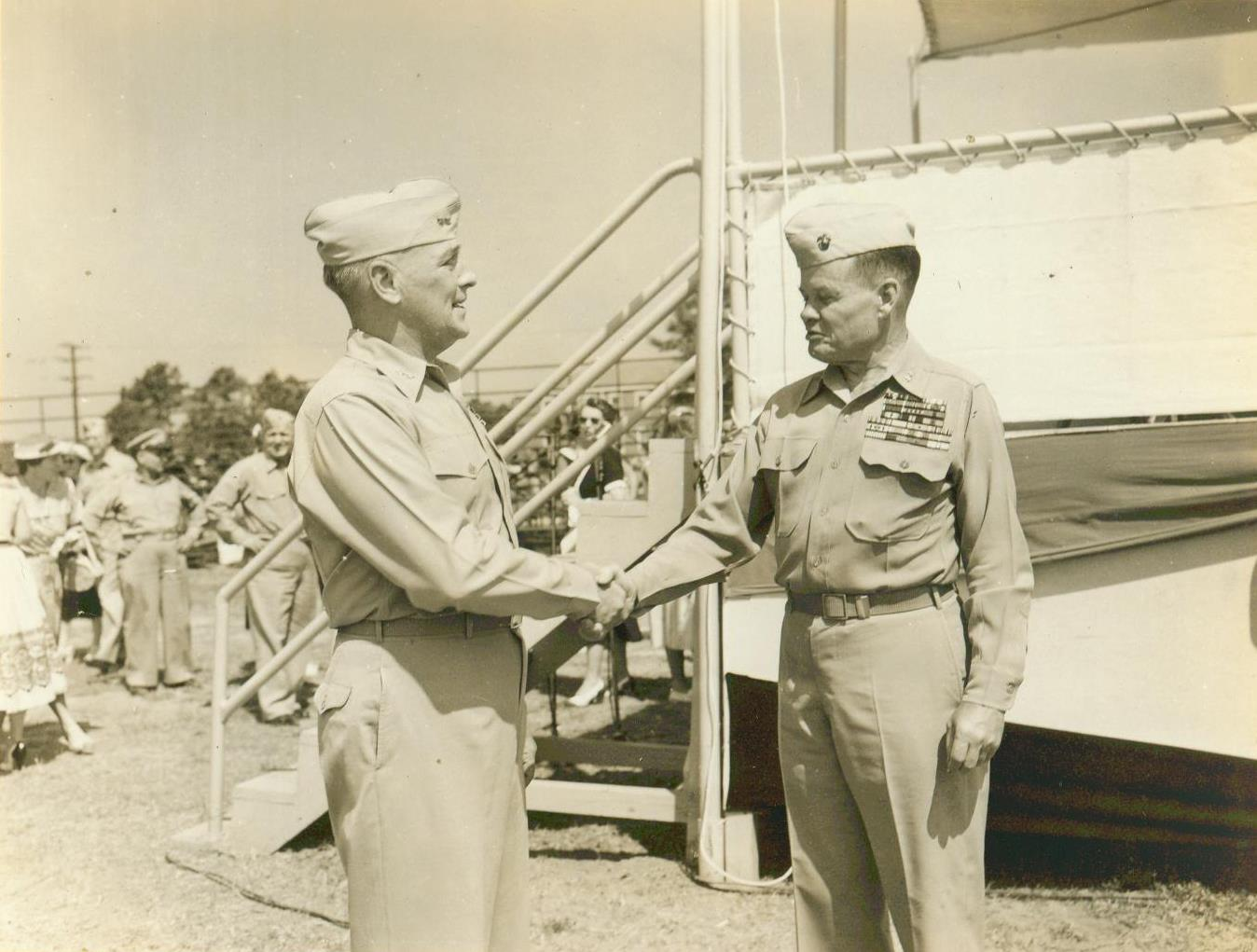
Change of Command, 2d Marine Division. Major General Good and Major General Chesty Puller, Camp Lejeune, July 1, 1954.

Colonel Good was ordered back to the States in December 1945 and assumed command of the Basic School at Marine Corps Base Quantico, Virginia. He was responsible for the training of newly commissioned Marine officer until August 1946, when he was relieved by Colonel Edward W. Snedeker. Good then served as director of instruction at Quantico until July 1948, when he was ordered back to 2nd Marine Division at Camp Lejeune, North Carolina and appointed chief of staff under Major General Franklin A. Hart.

In August 1950, Good was promoted to the rank of brigadier general and appointed commanding general of Troop Training Unit, Amphibious Training Command, Atlantic Fleet at Little Creek, Virginia. In this capacity, he was responsible for the amphibious training of all Marine Forces within Fleet Marine Force Atlantic. He spent two years with that assignment and subsequently was appointed Marine Corps liaison officer in the Office of Vice Chief of Naval Operations, Admiral Donald B. Duncan.

During July 1953, Good was promoted to the rank of major general and transferred back to Camp Lejeune to command his old 2nd Marine Division. He served with Second Division until July 1954, when he was transferred to Camp Pendleton, California and appointed deputy commander to John T. Selden. In this capacity, he was co-responsible for the training of the marine replacement units. In April 1955, Good was appointed Base commanding general and served in that capacity for next two years.

His final assignment came in July 1957, when he was ordered to San Francisco and appointed commanding general of Department of the Pacific. Good spent one year with the training and administration of Marine units along the West Coast and finally retired from active service in July 1958 after 35 years of service. He was advanced to the rank of lieutenant general for having been specially commended in combat.

== Retirement ==
Following his retirement, Good settled in Harlingen, Texas, where he died on October 25, 1991, at the age of 90. He is buried at United States Naval Academy Cemetery together with his wife, Jessie Garrison Good (1902–1998). They had together two sons: future Lieutenant Colonel George F. Good III, USMC and Midshipman Lee Good, and one daughter, Garrison Good Card.

== Decorations ==
Here is the ribbon bar of Lieutenant General George F. Good Jr.:

1st Row	Legion of Merit with Combat "V" and 5/16" Gold Star		Navy Presidential Unit Citation
2nd Row	Second Nicaraguan Campaign Medal	American Defense Service Medal with Base Clasp	European–African–Middle Eastern Campaign Medal
3rd Row	Asiatic-Pacific Campaign Medal with two 3/16 inch service stars	American Campaign Medal	World War II Victory Medal
4th Row	Navy Occupation Service Medal	National Defense Service Medal	Nicaraguan Cross of Valor with Diploma

Military offices
Preceded by Robert H. Pepper	Commanding General of Department of the Pacific; July 1957 – July 1958	Succeeded by James P. Berkeley
Preceded by John T. Selden	Commanding General of Camp Pendleton; April 1955 – July 1957	Succeeded by Reginald H. Ridgely Jr.
Preceded by Robert E. Hogaboom	Commanding General of 2nd Marine Division; June 24, 1953 – July 1, 1954	Succeeded by Chesty Puller

== See also ==
- Department of the Pacific
- List of 2nd Marine Division Commanders
- Marine defense battalions
- Robert H. Pepper
- Harry K. Pickett
- Bertram A. Bone
