= Ray A. Robinson =

United States Marine Corps general

Ray Albert Robinson
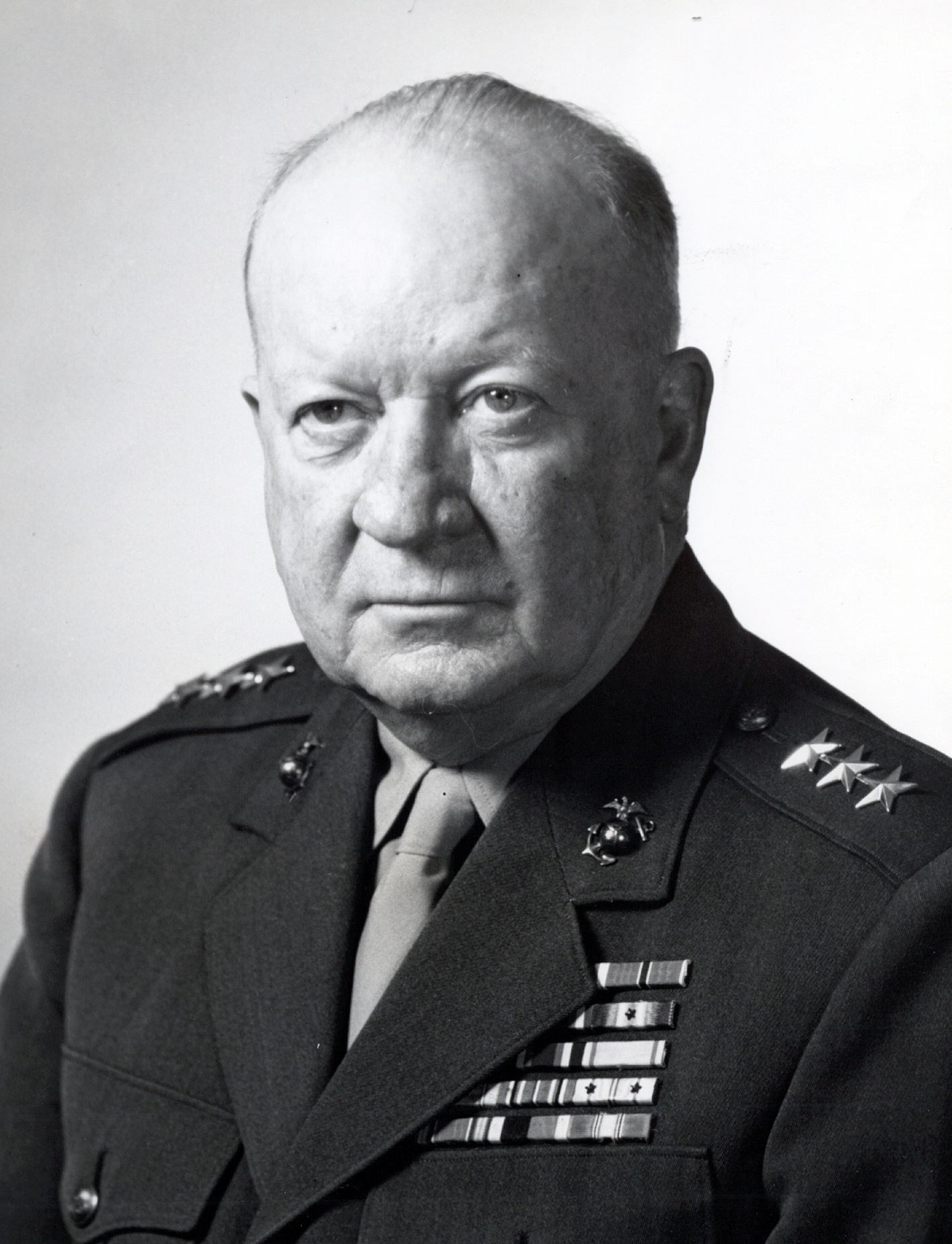
- Ray A. Robinson, USMC
- Born: June 1, 1896; Los Angeles, California
- Died: March 26, 1976 (aged 79); Seattle, Washington
- Military career
- Allegiance: United States of America
- Branch: United States Marine Corps
- Service years: 1917–1957
- Rank: General
- Commands: Inspector General, USMC; 2nd Marine Division; Camp Lejeune; Department of the Pacific; FMF Atlantic
- Conflicts: World War I; World War II; Battle of Guam; Battle of Iwo Jima
- Awards: Legion of Merit (2); Bronze Star

General Ray Albert Robinson (June 1, 1896 – March 26, 1976) was a United States Marine Corps general who served in the Corps more than 40 years. His long and colorful career included service in France during the First World War (as aide-de-camp to Smedley D. Butler), action at Guam and Iwo Jima in World War II, sea duty, and China service between World Wars. He also served in 1929 as officer in charge of the Marine detachment which built President Herbert Hoover's Rapidan Camp mountain retreat near Criglersville, Virginia. Robinson twice earned the Legion of Merit with Combat "V" during World War II — the first for outstanding service in July and August 1944, as chief of staff of the 3d Marine Division during the planning and execution of the recapture of Guam; and the second for outstanding service from October 1944 to March 1945, as chief of staff of the 5th Marine Division during the preparation and combat phases of the Iwo Jima campaign.

After the Iwo Jima campaign, Robinson was made assistant commander of the 5th Marine Division, earning the Bronze Star Medal for his service in that capacity during the occupation of Japan.

== Biography ==
Robinson was born on June 1, 1896, in Los Angeles, California, where he attended the University of Southern California before enlisting in the Marine Corps on May 21, 1917. After completing his recruit training, he was commissioned a second lieutenant on October 9, 1917, and during the next year, he completed the course at the Officer's Training School, Quantico, Virginia, and joined the newly activated 13th Marine Regiment.

=== World War I ===
After intensive training with the 13th Marines, he embarked with that regiment for France in September 1918. Overseas he saw service as aide-de-camp to Brigadier General Smedley D. Butler.

=== Inter-war years ===
Robinson returned from France in July 1919, and was stationed at Quantico until September 1921. He sailed shortly afterward to begin a two-year tour of duty at the Marine barracks, Pearl Harbor, Hawaii. Returning to the Mainland in December 1923, he served briefly at Headquarters, Department of the Pacific, San Francisco, California, before he was ordered to San Diego, California, in February 1924. There he served in a number of capacities, including duty with the staff of the commanding general, Western Mail Guard, during a wave of railway mail robberies. On completing that assignment, he joined the 4th Marine Regiment in January 1927, sailing with that unit for China the following month. In China, he later served on the staff of the commanding general, 3rd Marine Brigade, at Shanghai, and at Tianjin as the Chinese Kuomintang Army advanced northward.

Robinson returned from China in March 1929, and the following month, he reported to Quantico, where he was attached while serving that summer as officer in charge of the Marine detachment at President Hoover's summer camp. In September 1929, he entered the Company Officers Course in the Marine Corps Schools at Quantico, which he completed in June 1930. He then served briefly at San Diego before going to sea in October 1930, as commander of the Marine detachment aboard the USS Colorado. Completing that tour of duty in September 1932, he was ordered to the Marine barracks at the Puget Sound Navy Yard, Bremerton, Washington, where he served in various capacities for almost three years.

In August 1935, Robinson was again ordered to Quantico, where he served as post maintenance officer and safety engineer before entering the Senior Course in August, 1938. Graduating in May 1939, he was ordered once more to China. There he served successively as executive and operations officer of the Marine detachment at the American Embassy, Beiping; as commander of the Marine detachment at Tianjin, and as commander of Marine Forces, North China, and the embassy detachment at Beiping. He returned to the United States in June 1941, and the following month, he reported to Marine Corps Headquarters, Washington, D.C., to become assistant officer in charge of the personnel section, Division of Plans and Policies. He took charge of that section in April 1942. Thus, in 1942, when the commandant of the Marine Corps issued orders to recruit and train African Americans, the task of recruiting and training new African-American Marines fell to then-Colonel Robinson. Robinson sought the help of the Selective Service in this task. He served in the personnel section until October 1943, when he was named officer in charge of the operations and training section.

=== World War II ===
Leaving Washington in January 1944, Robinson embarked for the Pacific theater, where he became chief of staff of the 3rd Marine Division the following month. He was named chief of staff of the 5th Division in October 1944, serving in that capacity until June 1945, when he was named assistant commander of the 5th Division. He returned with that division from Japan in December 1945, and after the division was disbanded, he went back overseas in March 1946, as fleet Marine officer on the staff of the commander in chief, Pacific Ocean Area. He held that position until September 1946, when he became chief of staff, Fleet Marine Force.

=== Post-war service ===
In August 1947, Robinson reported again to Marine Corps Headquarters in Washington, where he served as director of the Division of Plans and Policies for almost two years. After that he was Inspector General of the Marine Corps from July 1949, until June 1950, when he took command of the 2nd Marine Division at Camp Lejeune, North Carolina. He served in that capacity until December 1951, and subsequently, as commanding general of camp Lejeune until August 1952, when he was appointed commanding general of the Department of the Pacific at San Francisco, California. He left San Francisco in June 1954, and two months later was ordered to The Hague as chief of the Military Assistance Advisory Group to the Netherlands.

Relieved by Major General John C. McQueen, Robinson was transferred to Norfolk in October 1956. Robinson served there as commanding general of Fleet Marine Force, Atlantic, from November 1, 1956, until his retirement from the Marine Corps on November 1, 1957. He was advanced to four-star rank on retirement by reason of having been specially commended for heroism in combat.

General Robinson died in Seattle, Washington, on March 26, 1976, at age 79.

== Awards and decorations ==
General Robinson's awards include:

	Legion of Merit w/ 1 award star & valor device	Bronze Star	
Navy Presidential Unit Citation w/ 1 service star	Navy Unit Commendation w/ 1 service star	Marine Corps Expeditionary Medal	World War I Victory Medal w/ 1 service star
Yangtze Service Medal	China Service Medal	American Defense Service Medal w/ Base clasp	American Campaign Medal
Asiatic-Pacific Campaign Medal w/ 2 service stars	World War II Victory Medal	Navy Occupation Service Medal	National Defense Service Medal

== See also ==
Military offices
Preceded by Alfred H. Noble	Commanding General of the Department of the Pacific; August 1952 - June 1953	Succeeded by Henry D. Linscott
