= Department of the Pacific (USMC) =

Historical USMC unit

- Active: 15 November 1920 – 1 July 1960
- Country: United States of America
- Allegiance: United States
- Branch: United States Marine Corps
- Role: Training and Administration
- Part of: Fleet Marine Force, Pacific
- Garrison/HQ: San Francisco
- Engagements: Banana Wars; World War II; Korean War

Department of the Pacific (MarPac) was a United States Marine Corps ground training and administrative command established on 15 November 1920, which was responsible for the administration, training and equipment of the Marine Corps Units on the West Coast, 14th Naval District (Hawaii and outlying Pacific islands), 16th Naval District (the Philippines), 17th Naval District (Alaska and Aleutian Islands) and Marine Forces in Northern China (China Marines).

== History ==
The Department of the Pacific was activated as Marine Corps subheadquarters on 15 November 1920 in San Francisco with former Commandant of the Marines, Major general George Barnett, in command. During the World War II, the staff and administrative units consisted of: Headquarters Company, Office of the Paymaster, Personnel Section (G-1), Intelligence Section (G-2), Operations Section (G-3) and Supply Section (G-4). Department of the Pacific administered all marine units and activities on the West Coast of the United States include Supply depots in San Francisco.

Following the end of War, responsibilities of Department of the Pacific were expanded to administration of all non Fleet Marine Force units in the Pacific Ocean Area. Department of the Pacific was deactivated on 1 July 1960 and its responsibilities were transferred to Fleet Marine Force Pacific and Headquarters Marine Corps.

== Commanding generals ==
#	Photo	Name	Rank	Start of tenure	End of tenure	Retired rank	Notes	References
1		George Barnett	Major general	15 November 1920	11 August 1923	Major General	Served as the 12th Commandant of the United States Marine Corps between 1914 and 1920	
2		Wendell C. Neville	Major general	12 August 1923	15 May 1927	Major General	Medal of Honor recipient and 14th Commandant of the Marine Corps between 1929 and 1930.	
3		Eli K. Cole	Major general	2 July 1927	4 July 1929	Major General	Navy Cross recipient and 1st Assistant Commandant of the Marine Corps between 1911 and 1915.	
4		Logan Feland	Major general	19 July 1929	25 February 1933	Major General	Distinguished Service Cross recipient and veteran of World War I and Banana Wars.	
5		John T. Myers	Major general	5 March 1933	29 January 1935	Lieutenant General	Marine Corps Brevet Medal recipient and veteran of Boxer Rebellion and Banana Wars.	
6		James C. Breckinridge	Major general	30 January 1935	23 May 1937	Lieutenant General	Navy Cross recipient and veteran of World War I and Banana Wars.	
7		Douglas C. McDougal	Brigadier general	24 May 1937	30 June 1937	Major General	Veteran of Banana Wars and 10th Assistant Commandant of the Marine Corps between 1934 and 1935.	
8		Charles H. Lyman II	Major general	2 July 1937	31 July 1939	Major General	Veteran of Banana Wars, father of late Rear admiral Charles H. Lyman III.	
9		Richard P. Williams	Brigadier general	20 September 1939	31 January 1940	Brigadier General	Navy Distinguished Service Medal recipient and veteran of Banana Wars.	
10		Charles F. B. Price	Brigadier general	15 February 1941	1 November 1941	Lieutenant General	Navy Distinguished Service Medal recipient and veteran of Banana Wars.	
11		William P. Upshur	Major general	1 January 1942	21 July 1943	Major General	Medal of Honor recipient, died in Air Crash while in the Office.	
12		John Marston	Major general	1 August 1943	20 April 1944	Brigadier General	Previously commanded the 1st Provisional Marine Brigade during the Occupation of Iceland and 2nd Marine Division at Guadalcanal.	
13		Joseph C. Fegan	Major general	1 May 1944	2 December 1944	Major General	Veteran of Banana Wars and father of late Lieutenant general Joseph C. Fegan Jr.	
14		Julian C. Smith	Major general	3 December 1944	1 February 1946	Lieutenant General	Navy Cross recipient and previously commanded 2nd Marine Division at Tarawa and Peleliu.	
15		Earl C. Long	Major general	1 February 1946	17 May 1946	Major General	Veteran of Banana Wars, previously commanded the Service Command, Fleet Marine Force, Pacific.	
16		Henry L. Larsen	Major general	18 May 1946	September 1946	Lieutenant General	Two awards of Navy Cross, Veteran of World War I and Banana Wars, the second Military Governor of Guam.	
17		Keller E. Rockey	Major general	September 1946	1 January 1947	Lieutenant General	Distinguished Service Cross recipient and two awards of Navy Cross, Veteran of World War I and Banana Wars.	
18		LeRoy P. Hunt	Major general	1 January 1947	1 July 1949	General	Distinguished Service Cross and Navy Cross recipient, Veteran of World War I and Banana Wars.	
19		Keller E. Rockey	Major general	1 July 1949	1 September 1950	Lieutenant General	Distinguished Service Cross recipient and two awards of Navy Cross, Veteran of World War I and Banana Wars.	
20		Graves B. Erskine	Major general	December 1950	July 1951	Lieutenant General	Veteran of World War I and Banana Wars, later served with Department of Defense.	
21		Alfred H. Noble	Major general	July 1951	August 1952	General	Distinguished Service Cross and Navy Cross recipient, Veteran of World War I and Banana Wars. Later commanded Fleet Marine Force, Atlantic.	
22		Ray A. Robinson	Major general	August 1952	June 1953	General	Veteran of Yangtze Patrol and Banana Wars. Later commanded Fleet Marine Force, Atlantic.	
23		Henry D. Linscott	Major general	June 1953	30 September 1955	Lieutenant General	Veteran of World War I, Banana Wars and Pacific War. Later commanded Camp Lejeune.	
24		Robert H. Pepper	Major general	30 September 1955	1 May 1957	Lieutenant General	Veteran of Guadalcanal Campaign. Later commanded Fleet Marine Force, Pacific.	
25		George F. Good Jr.	Major general	1 May 1957	July 1958	Lieutenant General	Veteran of Banana Wars and Pacific War. Two awards of Legion of Merit with Combat "V".	
26		James P. Berkeley	Major general	July 1958	November 1959	Lieutenant General	Veteran of Banana Wars and Pacific War. Later commanded Fleet Marine Force, Atlantic. A son of Major general Randolph C. Berkeley.	
27		Francis M. McAlister	Major general	January 1960	1 July 1960	Major General	Veteran of Banana Wars, Pacific War and Korean War. Silver Star and three awards of Legion of Merit with Combat "V".	

== See also ==
- Marine Air, West Coast
- Fleet Marine Force Pacific
