= George Barnett =

United States Marine Corps general

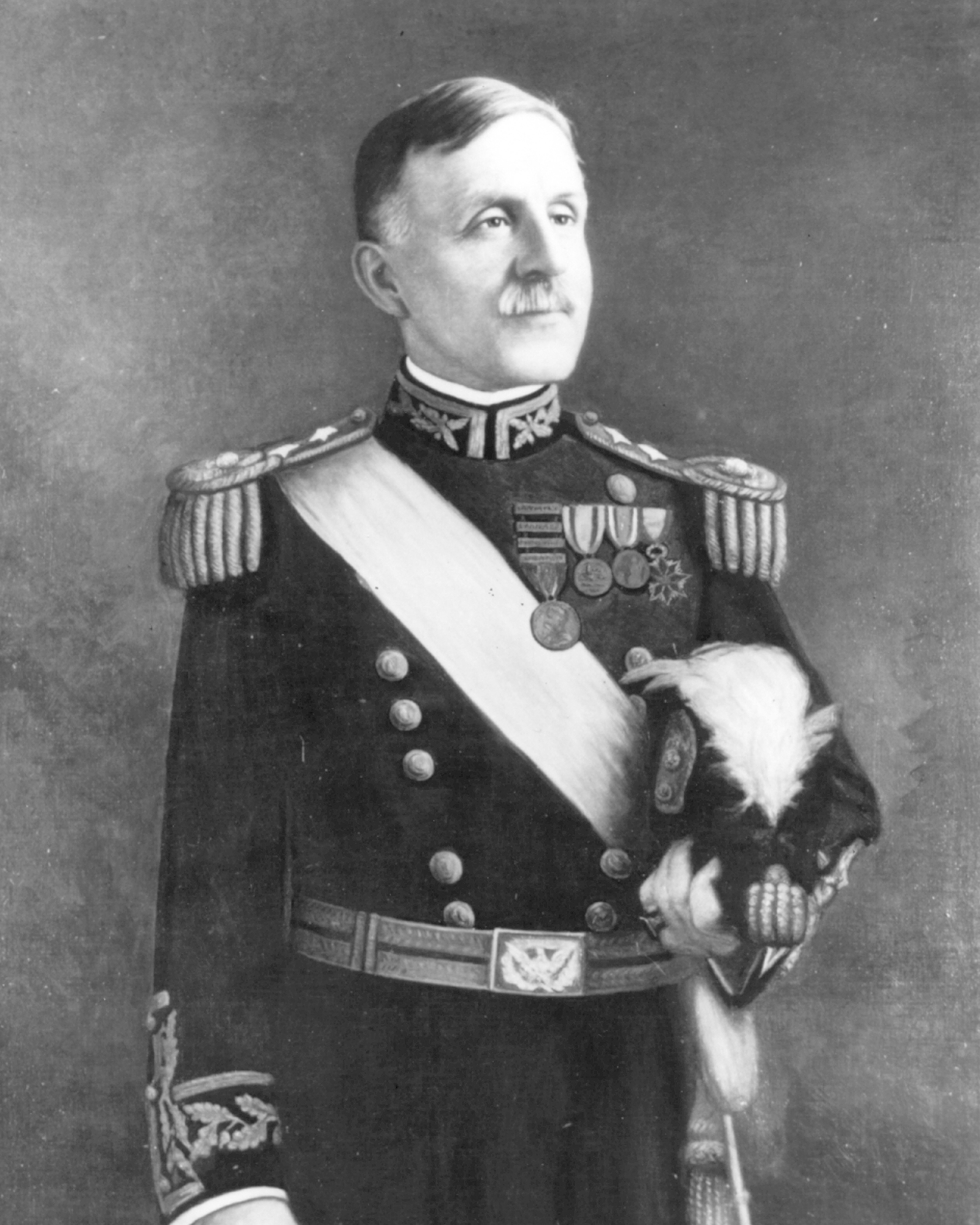
- 12th Commandant of the Marine Corps of the United States Marine Corps (1914–1920)
- Born: December 9, 1859; Lancaster, Wisconsin, U.S.
- Died: April 27, 1930 (aged 70); Washington, D.C., U.S.
- Burial place: Arlington National Cemetery
- Spouse: Lelia Montague Gordon (wife)
- Relatives: Thomas P.M. Barnett (cousin); Basil Gordon (stepson)
- Military career
- Allegiance: United States
- Branch: Marine Corps
- Service years: 1881–1883 (U.S. Navy); 1883–1923 (U.S. Marine Corps)
- Rank: Major General
- Commands: Commandant of the Marine Corps; Department of the Pacific; 1st Marine Regiment
- Conflicts: Spanish–American War; Philippine–American War; Banana Wars; Second Occupation of Cuba; World War I
- Awards: Navy Distinguished Service Medal; French Legion of Honor (Commander)

Signature
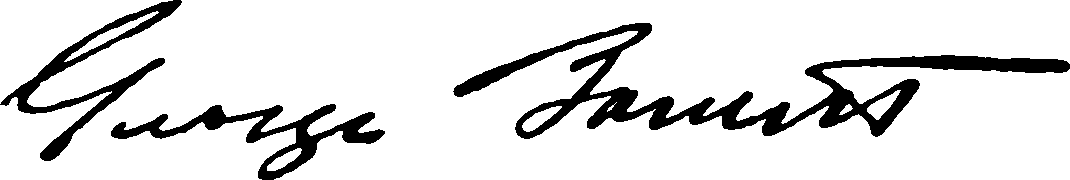

George Barnett (December 9, 1859 – April 27, 1930) was the 12th Commandant of the United States Marine Corps. He was a pioneer of amphibious warfare and the U.S. Marine Commandant during American involvement in World War I.

== Early life and education ==
Barnett was born on December 9, 1859, in Lancaster, Wisconsin, and grew up in Boscobel, Wisconsin. He entered the U.S. Naval Academy in June 1877, graduating in 1881 with the first academy class to provide officers to the Marine Corps. After spending two years at sea as a cadet-midshipman aboard USS Essex, he was transferred to the Marine Corps and was appointed a second lieutenant on 1 July 1883. While serving as a second lieutenant he did duty at the various Marine Barracks in the eastern part of the United States and commanded the Marine contingent at Sitka, Alaska, for three years. He was again at sea on USS Iroquois at the time he was promoted to first lieutenant in September 1890.

After completing the second of several tours of sea duty he served one year at the Marine Barracks, Navy Yard, Washington, D.C., and was then attached to a U.S. Marine guard at the World's Columbian Exposition at Chicago, where he remained until it closed. At that time he resumed his regular duties at the Washington, D.C. Navy Yard.

== Career ==
=== Spanish–American War ===
In June 1896, Barnett again went to sea, this time aboard USS Vermont. He was transferred to USS San Francisco in December 1897 and to USS New Orleans during the following April. While serving on that vessel during the Spanish–American War, he participated in several bombardments of the forts at Santiago, Cuba. He was advanced to captain on 11 August 1898, and was transferred to USS Chicago in November of that year. In that same year, Barnett became a Veteran Companion of the Pennsylvania Commandery of the Military Order of Foreign Wars.

=== Commands ===
Barnett, as a captain, came ashore for duty at Marine Corps Headquarters in Washington, D.C., in May 1901, and was promoted to major shortly afterwards. During the following year he was given command of a battalion of U.S. Marines on USS Panther and sent for duty on the Isthmus of Panama, where they protected American interests and guarded the railway transit of the Isthmus.

Major Barnett returned to Washington in December 1902, only to be placed in command of another battalion of Marines being transferred less than a month later to join the first Brigade of Marines in the Philippine Islands. Arriving in the Philippines a few months later, he was transferred to duty as a Fleet Marine Officer of the Asiatic Fleet and served on several vessels of that fleet until December 1904, when he rejoined the First Brigade of Marines.

Barnett was then transferred from the Philippine Islands to Washington, D.C., in April 1905, and shortly after arriving in the United States received a promotion to lieutenant colonel. He attended the Naval War College in 1906 and served as Commanding Officer, Marine Barracks, Navy Yard in Washington for a period of one year when he was again placed in command of an expeditionary battalion which sailed on board USS Minneapolis for Havana, Cuba, where it landed and became part of the Army of Cuban Pacification.

Lt. Colonel Barnett's organization was augmented to a regiment soon after landing in Cuba, while the entire Marine Expeditionary Force was increased to a brigade under the command of Colonel Littleton W.T. Waller. Barnett's regiment was almost immediately transferred to Cianfuegos, where it spread out over a wide area with Barnett controlling a considerable portion of the island. A large army expeditionary force relieved part of the Marines in Cuba and Barnett returned to Washington early in November 1906.

After commanding the U.S. Marine Barracks in Washington for a period of one year, Barnett was transferred to the U.S. Marine Corps Headquarters and was shortly afterwards ordered to command the Marine Detachment, American Legation, Peking, China. Upon completing his tour of duty in the Far East he returned to the United States during the summer of 1910 and assumed command of the Marine Barracks, Philadelphia, Pennsylvania. He was promoted to the rank of colonel on 11 October of that year.

During the next three years he was sent to Cuba, each year in command of the First Regiment of Marines, which was repeatedly sent to that troublesome island on account of serious domestic disturbances, which the United States was obligated to control under provisions of the Platt Amendment. While this serious undertaking was being conducted, the First Advanced Base Brigade of Marines was organized at Philadelphia, under the command of Barnett. He led that organization on extensive maneuvers with the Atlantic Fleet to Puerto Rico from which he returned on 15 February.

=== Commandant of the Marine Corps ===
Barnett was appointed Major General Commandant of the Marine Corps on 25 February 1914 for a period of four years. He was the first Commandant to be appointed on a four-year term in accordance with a law passed the previous year. He was promoted to permanent brigadier general on 29 August 1916.

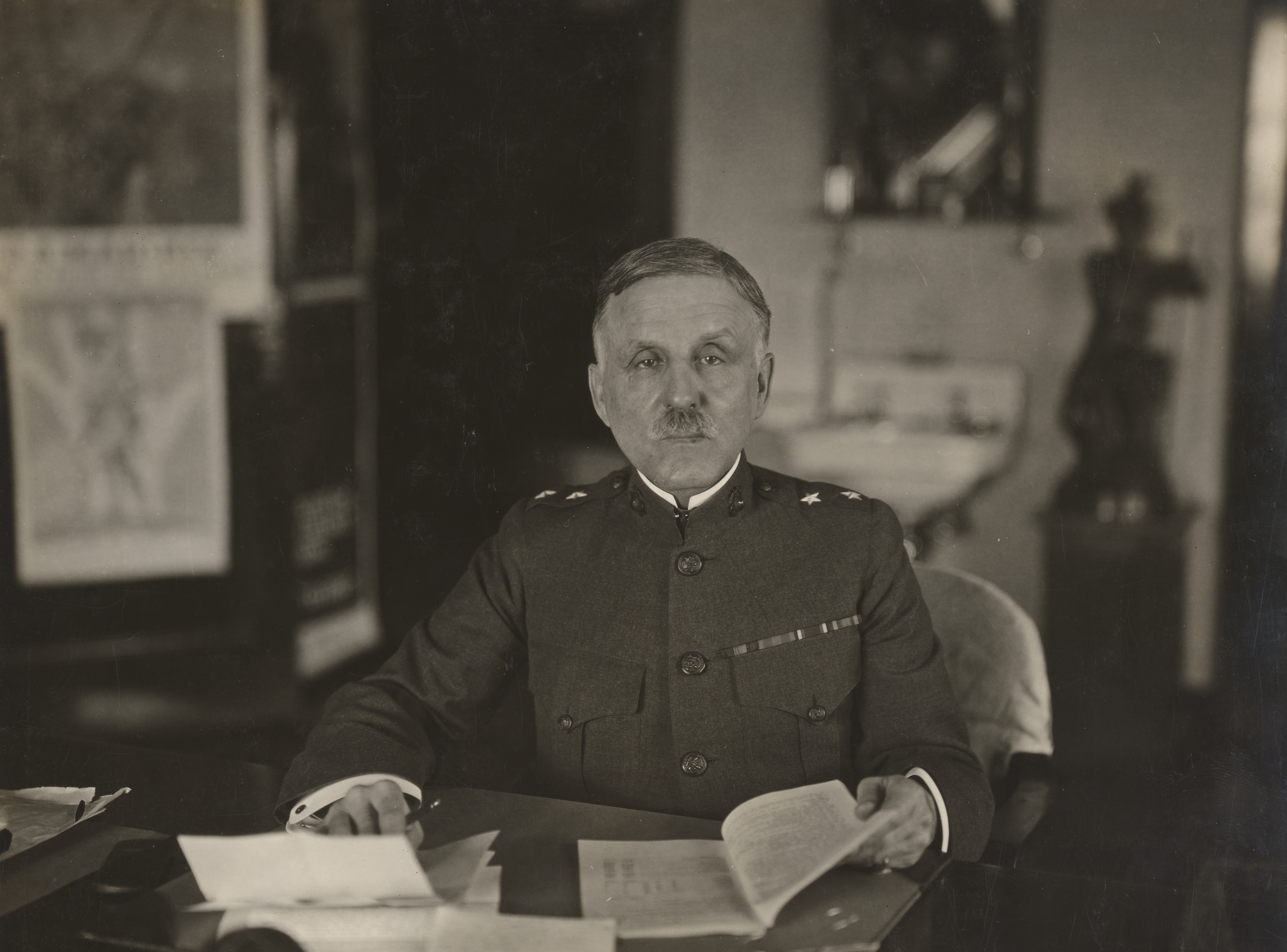
Garnett as Commandant of the Marine Corps in April 1918.

The first important military event of his administration as Commandant was the sending of a reinforced brigade of Marines to take part in the operations which occurred at Vera Cruz, Mexico, during 1914. A minor intervention in Haiti was made during that year and an expeditionary force of Marines was kept afloat for some time along the west coast of Mexico. Serious trouble began to brew in both Haiti and Santo Domingo and within a year it was necessary for the Marine Corps under Commandant Barnett's guidance to place a brigade of Marines in each of these two countries, where they continued on duty until after the close of his administration.

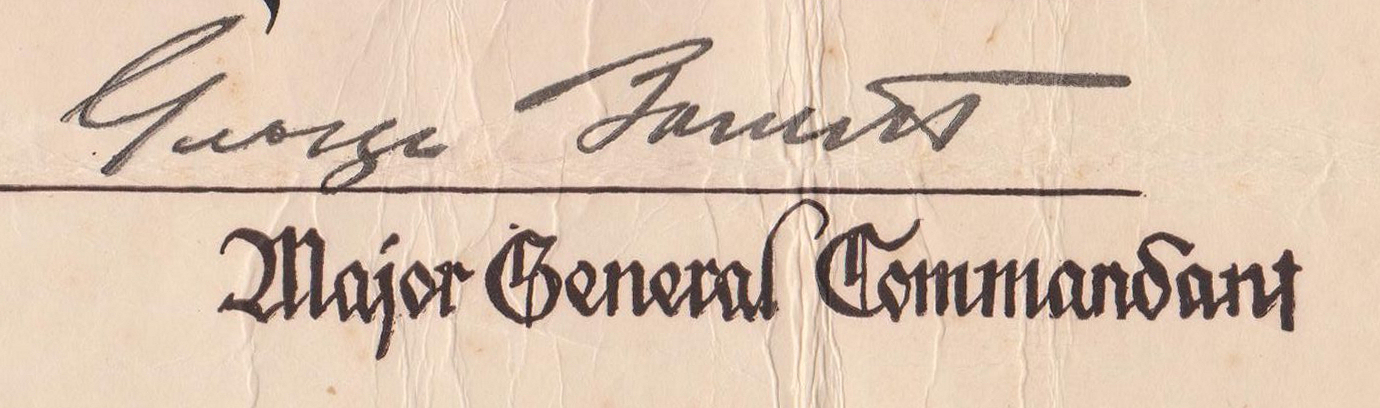
Signature of George Barnett

World War I activities of the Marine Corps were carried out under the general direction of Commandant Barnett as well. The Marine Corps expanded to more than three thousand officers and approximately 75,500 enlisted men. In addition to maintaining the occupation of Haiti and the Dominican Republic and reinforcing the regular stations of the Marine Corps, two brigades of Marines were deployed to France, while other Marine units occupied parts of Cuba, and another Marine brigade was held in reserve in Galveston, Texas. Large training centers were also established at Quantico, Virginia, and Parris Island, South Carolina. Barnett also saw the Marine Corps through the difficult period of demobilization and reorganization at the close of the war. For his outstanding service, he was honored by the French Government by being made a commander of the Legion of Honor, and he was awarded the Navy Distinguished Service Medal by the Secretary of the Navy. The citation for the medal reads:

The President of the United States of America takes pleasure in presenting the Navy Distinguished Service Medal to Major General George Barnett, United States Marine Corps, for exceptionally meritorious service in a duty of great responsibility as Commandant of the Marine Corps from 25 February 1914 to 30 June 1920, in the administration of his high office and the organization and direction of the manifold and distinguished service of the Marine Corps at home and abroad.

== Later life and death ==
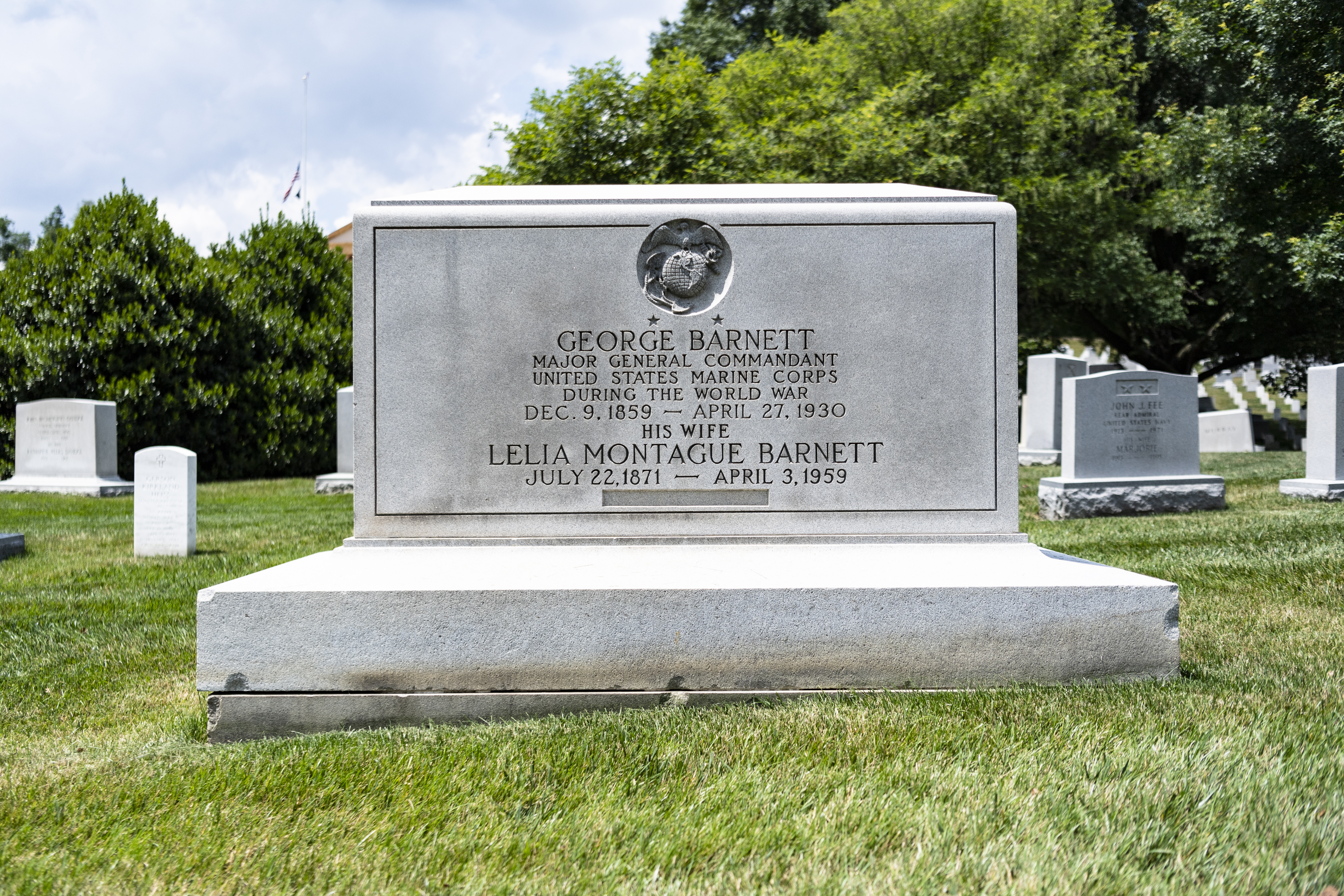
Grave at Arlington National Cemetery

Barnett was relieved as Commandant of the Marine Corps on 30 June 1920, by order of Secretary of the Navy Josephus Daniels and resumed his permanent rank as Brigadier General. On 5 March 1921, he was given the regular rank of Major General. He spent the remaining years of his active service as Commanding General of the Department of the Pacific.

Barnett retired on 9 December 1923, having reached the statutory age limit of 64 years. He died on 27 April 1930 in Washington, D.C., and was buried at Arlington National Cemetery.

== Personal life ==
Barnett was the nephew of John Benton Callis. Barnett is related to the military strategist Thomas P.M. Barnett (first cousin thrice removed). General Barnett's wife, Lelia (Montague) Gordon, was the first cousin of Alice (Montague) Warfield, the mother of Bessie Wallis Warfield, later Wallis, Duchess of Windsor, and sister-in-law to Captain Henry C. Mustin. His stepson, Basil Gordon (father of Basil Gordon), also served in the United States Marine Corps.

== Awards ==
- Sampson Medal
- Spanish Campaign Medal
- Philippine Campaign Medal
- Cuban Pacification Medal
- Victory Medal

Military offices
Preceded by Major General William P. Biddle	Commandant of the United States Marine Corps; 1914–1920	Succeeded by Major General John A. Lejeune
