= Matthew C. Horner =

U.S. Marine Corps Major General

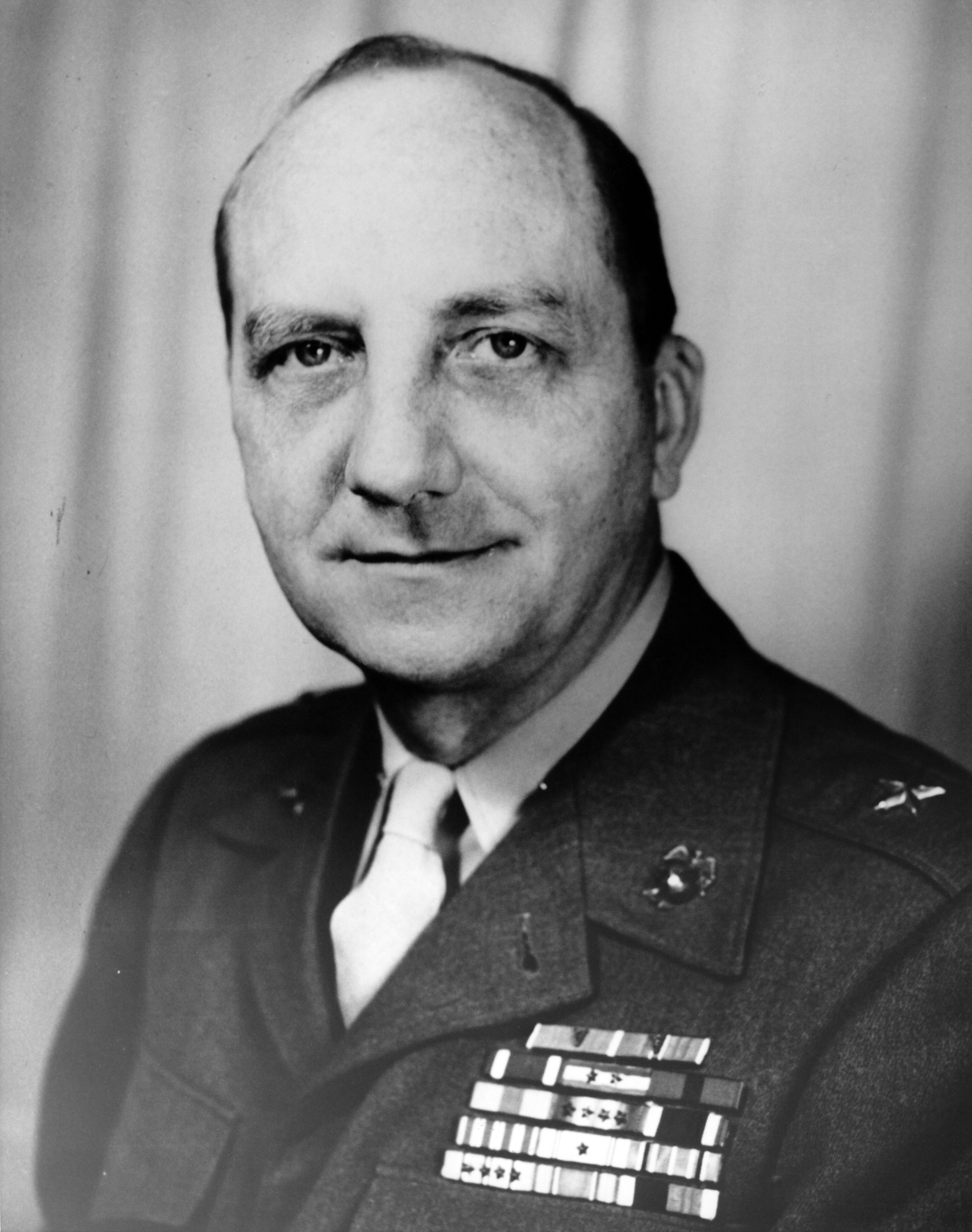
- Horner as Brigadier General
- Born: March 10, 1901; Johnstown, Pennsylvania, U.S.
- Died: June 27, 1972 (aged 71)
- Burial place: Arlington National Cemetery
- Military career
- Allegiance: United States
- Branch: United States Marine Corps
- Service years: 1917–1956
- Rank: Major general
- Service number: 0-4039
- Commands: MCRD Parris Island; S-4 of 4th Marine Division
- Conflicts: World War I; Aisne-Marne Offensive; Battle of Saint-Mihiel; Meuse-Argonne Offensive; Nicaraguan Campaign; Yangtze Patrol; World War II; Battle of Roi-Namur; Battle of Saipan; Battle of Tinian; Battle of Iwo Jima
- Awards: Legion of Merit; Bronze Star Medal; Navy Commendation Medal

Matthew Charles Horner (March 10, 1901 – June 27, 1972) was an officer of the United States Marine Corps with the rank of major general, who served as Supply Officer of 4th Marine Division and later as commanding general of the Marine Corps Recruit Depot Parris Island. The Major General Matthew C. Horner Chair of Military Theory is named in his honor.

== Early years ==
Matthew C. Horner was born on March 10, 1901, in Johnstown, Pennsylvania, and later attended local grade and high schools. He enlisted in the United States Army on August 29, 1917, at the age of 16. Following his basic training, Horner was attached to the 5th Infantry Division under Major General John E. McMahon and sailed to France.

He took part in the Aisne-Marne Offensive, Battle of Saint-Mihiel or Meuse-Argonne Offensive and later also participated in the Occupation of the Rhineland. His unit was ordered back to the United States during summer 1919, and Horner was discharged from the army in June 1919.

Horner spent some time in Pittsburgh, before he decided for return to the military, but chose the United States Marine Corps on April 15, 1922. After few years as enlisted man, Horner reached the rank of sergeant and received the Marine Corps Good Conduct Medal for his distinguished enlisted service. He was also recommended for the Officer Candidates School in Washington, D.C., which he entered during July 1925.

Upon graduation, Horner was commissioned second lieutenant on March 5, 1926, and sent for further training at Sea School within Norfolk Naval Yard. He remained there until February 1927, when he was ordered for Basic Officer Course at the Basic School within Philadelphia Navy Yard. Following his graduation in July 1927, Horner was assigned to the Marine barracks within Charleston Naval Shipyard, South Carolina, where he served until he was transferred to the Marine detachment aboard the battleship USS Mississippi in March 1928.

He sailed with that ship to Hawaii, before being ordered to Nicaragua in June 1928. Horner served ashore in El Sauce, León and participated in the patrol duties until January 1929, when he rejoined his ship at Balboa, Panama. He finished his tour of sea duty in April 1930 and subsequently was assigned to the Marine barracks at Norfolk Naval Yard, where he served as instructor at Sea School.

Following his promotion to the rank of first lieutenant, Horner was transferred to Criglersville, Virginia, in March 1932, where he was appointed commander of Guard Platoon at President Hoover's summer camp. However, this duty was only temporary, and he was transferred to the Naval Operating Base at Norfolk, Virginia, in November 1932 and appointed judge advocate with the Permanent General court-martial and assistant legal aide to the commandant of the Fifth Naval District, Vice Admiral Arthur L. Willard.

The next expeditionary duty came in December 1933, when he was attached to the 4th Marine Regiment under Colonel John C. Beaumont and sailed for Shanghai, China as company commander. While in China, he was later appointed 4th Regiment's Assistant Intelligence officer and finally returned to the United States in May 1936. Horner was subsequently attached to the Junior Course at Marine Corps Schools in Quantico, Virginia, and following his graduation in May 1937, he served as an instructor on the staff of the schools there.

== World War II ==
Horner remained in that capacity until the end of January 1941, when he was appointed commander of the provisional Marine detachment located at Quantico and subsequently sailed for Portland Bight, Jamaica, in March of the same year. In addition to commanding the Marine detachment during the construction and activation of the Naval Air Station on the island, Horner also served as liaison officer to the British Military Headquarters and senior naval representative on the Governor's Defense Council under Sir Arthur Frederick Richards.

He was subsequently ordered stateside in November 1942 and transferred to Washington, D.C., where he was attached to the office of Vice Chief of Naval Operations under Vice Admiral Frederick J. Horne. Horner served as progress officer for the amphibious bases and operations and subsequently received the Navy Commendation Medal for his work in this capacity and also for his service in Jamaica.

Before the 4th Marine Division was activated, Horner joined East Coast Echelon of the division at Camp Lejeune in May 1943. He served as chief of staff of the echelon, and, following the absorption of the East Coast Echelon into 4th Marine Division under Major General Harry Schmidt in August 1943, Horner was appointed division infantry operations officer. He sailed for the Pacific theater in January 1944 and subsequently participated in the Battle of Roi-Namur. Horner served on the staff of the 4th Marine Division during the Marianas Islands Campaign in July 1944 and subsequently received the Legion of Merit with Combat "V" for his service as assistant operations officer.

After promotion to the rank of colonel in December 1944, Horner was appointed supply officer of 4th Marine Division under Major General Clifton B. Cates. During February 1945, Horner took part in the Battle of Iwo Jima and subsequently distinguished himself again, while took part in the preparing logistics and basic operations plans and for his direction of the logistics phase of the campaign. He received the Bronze Star Medal with Combat "V" for this work.

== Postwar career ==
Toward the end of the World War II, Horner became assistant chief of staff and supply officer of the V Amphibious Corps in May 1945 under his old superior, Major General Harry Schmidt. He participated in the postwar Occupation of Japan and finally returned to the United States after the deactivation of the V Amphibious Corps in February 1946. General Schmidt subsequently went to the command of the Marine Training and Replacement Command at Camp Pendleton, California, and appointed Horner as his assistant chief of staff and operations and training officer. However, Horner remained in this capacity just until July 1946, when he was transferred to Washington, D.C., to be assigned to the Joint Logistics Plans Committee of the Joint Chiefs of Staff.

Horner was transferred to the Headquarters Marine Corps in December 1947, where he was appointed chief of the Intelligence section within Division of Plans and Policies. He remained in this capacity until July 1948, when he was transferred to Marine Corps Base Quantico for duty with the Marine Corps Equipment Board, a bureau of standards for the Marines that tests, evaluates and recommends every piece of equipment used by the men. During the next three years, Horner served as executive officer, deputy president and finally as a president of the board.

He was subsequently transferred to the Bremerton Navy Yard, Washington in June 1951 and appointed commanding officer the Marine barracks located there. Highlight of his career came in December 1951, when he was promoted to the rank of brigadier general and transferred to the Marine Corps Recruit Depot Parris Island, South Carolina, as deputy commander to Major General Robert H. Pepper. When general Pepper was appointed transferred to Camp Pendleton in January 1952, Horner assumed the temporary command of the Marine Corps Recruit Depot Parris Island. General Merwin H. Silverthorn relieved him one month later and Horner resumed his duties as deputy commander.

General Horner was ordered to Camp Lejeune in July 1952 and appointed deputy to the president of the Joint Landing Force Board. Subsequently, ordered to the Naval Amphibious Base Little Creek in July 1954, Horner took over the command of Landing Troop Training Unit, Atlantic from Brigadier General Leonard B. Cresswell. He headed the amphibious training of the Marine Forces for Fleet Marine Force Atlantic until 1956, when he retired from the Marine Corps. Horner was subsequently advanced to the rank of major general for having been specially commended in combat.

== Decorations ==
Here is the ribbon bar of Major General Matthew C. Horner:

| 1st row | Legion of Merit with Combat "V" | | Bronze Star Medal with Combat "V" | Navy Commendation Medal | |
| 2nd row | Navy Presidential Unit Citation with two stars | Marine Corps Good Conduct Medal | | Marine Corps Expeditionary Medal | World War I Victory Medal with four battle Clasp |
| 3rd row | Army of Occupation of Germany Medal | Second Nicaraguan Campaign Medal | | American Defense Service Medal with Base Clasp | American Campaign Medal |
| 4th row | Asiatic-Pacific Campaign Medal with four 3/16 inch service stars | World War II Victory Medal | | Navy Occupation Service Medal | National Defense Service Medal |

Military offices
| Preceded by Robert H. Pepper | Commanding General of the Marine Corps Recruit Depot Parris Island; 30 January 1952 – 29 February 1952 | Succeeded by Merwin H. Silverthorn |
