= Alfred H. Noble =

United States Marine Corps general (1894–1983)

Alfred Houston Noble
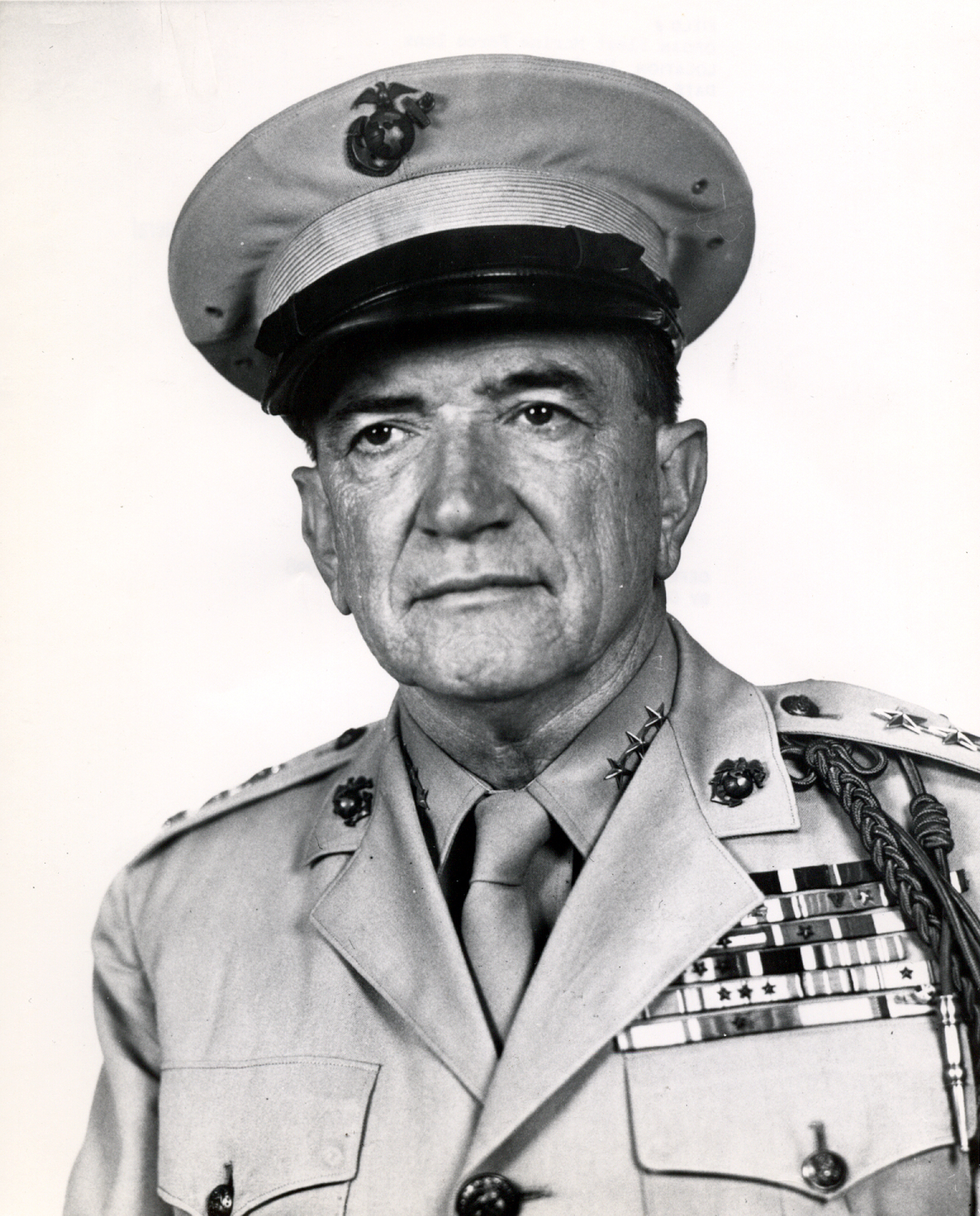
- General Alfred H. Noble, USMC
- Born: October 26, 1894; Federalsburg, Maryland
- Died: September 27, 1983 (aged 88); LaJolla, California
- Military career
- Allegiance: United States of America
- Branch: United States Marine Corps
- Service years: 1917–1956
- Rank: General
- Unit: 6th Marines
- Commands: 5th Marines; Marine Corps Training Command; MCRD Parris Island; Department of the Pacific; Camp Lejeune; Fleet Marine Force, Atlantic
- Conflicts: World War I: Battle of Belleau Wood; Banana Wars: Occupation of Nicaragua; Occupation of Haiti; World War II
- Awards: Navy Cross; Distinguished Service Cross; Silver Star (2); Legion of Merit (combat "V") (2); Croix de Guerre; French Fourragere

General Alfred Houston Noble (October 26, 1894 – September 27, 1983) was a United States Marine Corps general who served in combat with the Marines from World War I in the Battle of Belleau Wood to World War II in the Pacific theater. His last command, before retiring from the Marine Corps with over 39 years of service, was as commanding general, Fleet Marine Force, Atlantic in Norfolk, Virginia.

== Biography ==
Alfred Noble was born on October 26, 1894, at Federalsburg, Maryland. After graduation from St. John's College, at Annapolis, he reported for active duty as a Marine second lieutenant on May 24, 1917, and embarked for France that October.

=== World War I ===
During World War I, Noble fought as commander of the 83rd Company, 6th Marine Regiment, in the Aisne-Marne Defensive, (Chateau Thierry), the Aisne-Marne Offensive (Soissons), the St. Mihiel Offensive and the Meuse-Argonne Offensive (Champagne and Argonne Forest). He was awarded the Navy Cross, the Distinguished Service Cross, the Silver Star with Oak Leaf Cluster and the Croix de Guerre with silver star and diploma. In addition he was cited twice in General Orders of the War Department and once by the commanding general, AEF. He was also entitled to wear the French Fourragere which was awarded the 6th Marines.

Noble's Navy Cross was for gallantry in action from 6-June 8, 1918, during the battle of Belleau Wood. The citation states in part:

"…He was conspicuous for his judgment and personal courage in handling his company in attacks against superior numbers in strongly fortified machine-gun positions. His fortitude and initiative enabled his command each time to achieve success."

By the end of World War I, he had risen to the rank of captain.

=== Interwar years ===
After the war, he served in the Army of Occupation in Germany until returned to the United States in July 1919.

In September 1919, Noble went overseas again to serve at the Marine Barracks, St. Thomas, Virgin, Islands, until June 1922. After that, he completed the Company Officers Course in the Marine Corps Schools at Quantico, Virginia, then served there as adjutant and secretary of the schools and as commanding officer of the Marine Corps Schools Detachment. He left Quantico in June 1927, and the following month, began a two-year command of the Marine detachment aboard the USS California (BB-44) serving with that detachment on expeditionary duty in Nicaragua. He returned to Quantico in July 1929, and during the next three years, he completed the Field Officers Course and served as an instructor in that course.

From July 1932, until August 1934, Noble served with the 1st Brigade Marines in Haiti. He was stationed in the Adjutant and Inspectors' Department at Marine Corps Headquarters, Washington, D.C., from September 1934 to May 1937, then was ordered once more to Quantico. There, after serving as assistant commandant of the Marine Corps Schools and as the commander of the 2nd Battalion of the 5th Marines, he took command of that regiment. He served in that capacity at Guantanamo Bay, Cuba, and elsewhere in the Caribbean during training and maneuvers before he was again ordered to Marine Corps Headquarters in May 1941. This time he served with the Division of Plans and Policies as officer in charge of the Material Section, and later, as director, Division of Plans and Policies. He was a colonel when the United States entered World War II.

=== World War II ===
Noble was twice awarded the Legion of Merit with Combat "V", in World War II. The first was for outstanding service from September to December 1943, as chief of staff and deputy commander of I Marine Amphibious Corps during the Treasury Islands occupation, the diversionary landing on Choiseul Island and the establishment of the beachhead at Empress Augustas Bay, Bougainville. The second was for outstanding service from May to August 1944, as assistant commander of the 3rd Marine Division during the planning and execution of the recapture of Guam.

In September 1942, the general was named chief of staff of the newly activated 3rd Marine Division. He served in that capacity for a year, sailing with the division for the Pacific theater in February 1943. He remained overseas as chief of staff and deputy commander of I Marine Amphibious Corps from September to December 1943, and as assistant commander of the 3rd Division from January to October 1944. Returning to the United States in November 1944, he served as commanding general of the Marine Training Command at Camp Lejeune, North Carolina, until January 1946.

=== Post-World War II service ===
In February 1946, Noble reported to Pearl Harbor as commanding general of the Marine Garrison Forces, 14th Naval District. He was ordered from Pearl Harbor to Tientsin, China, in August 1946, and after serving there for several months as assistant commander of the 1st Marine Division, he returned to the United States to take command of the Troop Training Unit, Amphibious Forces, Pacific Fleet, at Coronado, California.

From there, he reported to Parris Island, South Carolina, in February 1948, as commanding general, Marine Corps Recruit Depot. He served in that capacity until August 1950, for the next year as commanding general of the Marine barracks at Camp Pendleton, California, and for the following year as commanding general of the Department of the Pacific at San Francisco.

Ordered to the Netherlands in August 1952, Noble served in that country for two years prior to assuming command of the Marine Corps Base at Camp Lejeune in September 1954. He was transferred to Norfolk, Virginia, as commanding general, Fleet Marine Force Atlantic, on September 1, 1955, and was promoted to the rank of lieutenant general on the same date. He served in that capacity until November 1, 1956, when he retired after 39 years of service and was promoted to four-star general.

Following his retirement, France awarded him the Legion of Honour for service to the Allied Cause during two World Wars and for his sympathy to France and its people.

== Awards and decorations ==

1st Row	Navy Cross	Distinguished Service Cross	Silver Star w/ 1 oak leaf cluster	Legion of Merit w/ 1 award star & valor device	French Fourragère
2nd Row	Navy and Marine Corps Commendation Medal	Navy Presidential Unit Citation w/ 1 service star	Navy Unit Commendation w/ 1 service star	Marine Corps Expeditionary Medal	French Fourragère
3rd Row	World War I Victory Medal w/ Aisne, Aisne-Marne, Meuse-Argonne, & Defensive Sector clasps	Army of Occupation of Germany Medal	China Service Medal	Nicaraguan Campaign Medal (1933)	French Fourragère
4th Row	American Defense Service Medal w/ Base clasp	American Campaign Medal	Asiatic-Pacific Campaign Medal w/ 3 service stars	World War II Victory Medal	French Fourragère
5th Row	National Defense Service Medal	Croix de guerre (WWI) w/ silver star	Haitian Diploma of Honor and Merit, Officer	Order of Orange-Nassau, Commander, w/ crossed swords	French Fourragère

== See also ==
- List of United States Marine Corps four-star generals
