= Charles F. B. Price =

United States Marine Corps general

Charles Frederick Berthold Price
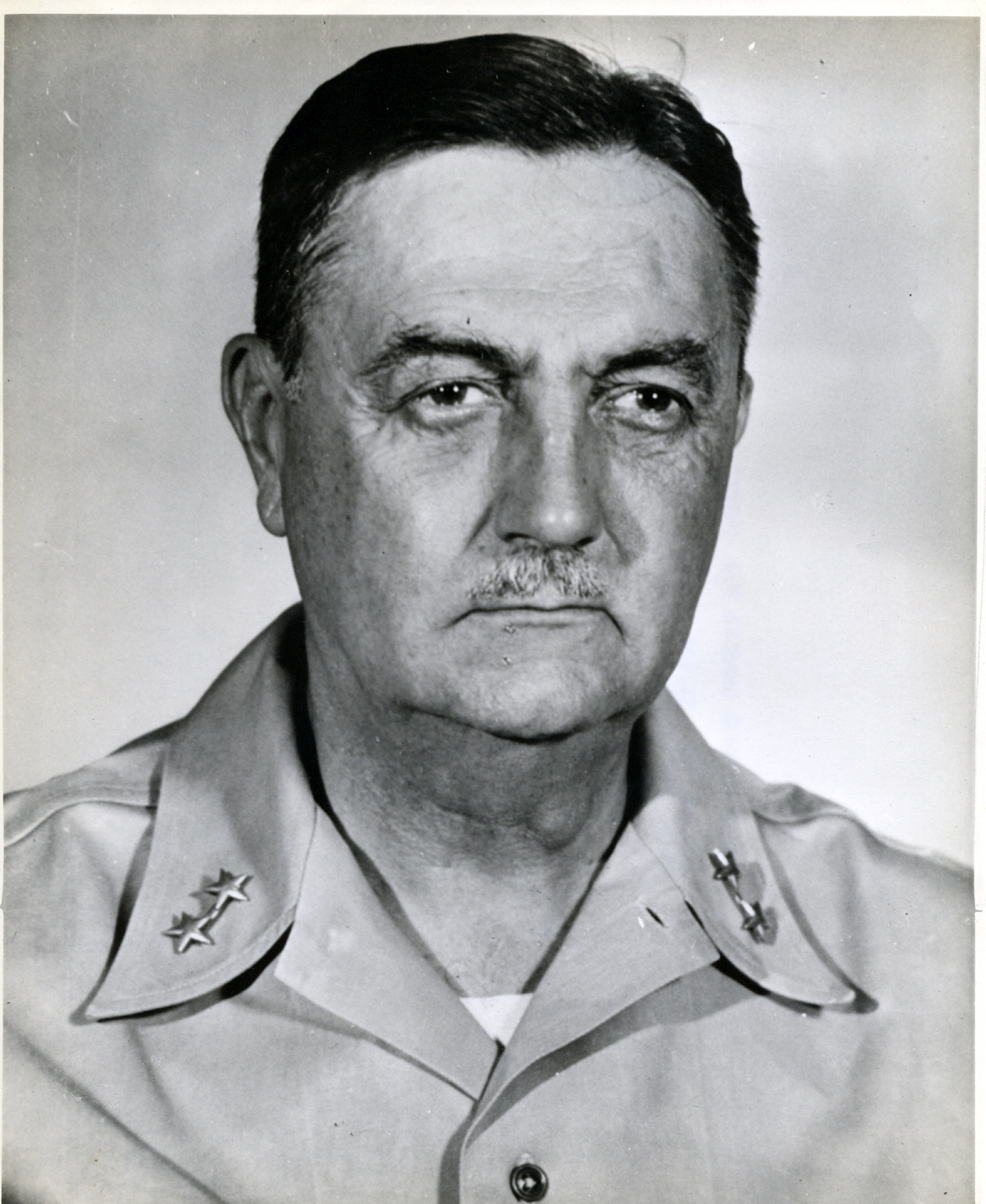
- Born: September 18, 1881; Hamburg, Germany
- Died: January 23, 1954 (aged 72); San Diego, California, US
- Military career
- Allegiance: United States
- Branch: United States Marine Corps
- Service years: 1906–1945
- Rank: Lieutenant general
- Commands: 15th Separate Battalion; Department of the Pacific; 2nd Marine Division; Defense Forces, Samoan Group; Marine Corps Training and Replacement Command
- Conflicts: Spanish–American War The Banana Wars; Veracruz; World War I World War II
- Awards: Navy Distinguished Service Medal; Legion of Merit

Charles Frederick Berthold Price (September 18, 1881 – January 23, 1954) was a Lieutenant General of the United States Marine Corps, who saw service during Cuban Pacification, Spanish–American War, World War I and World War II.

Retired Marine Lieutenant General Charles F.B. Price, who was awarded the Legion of Merit by Admiral Chester W. Nimitz, in recognition of his "outstanding work in successfully coordinating and supervising the defense of the Samoan Islands," died in 1954 at the age of 72 in the Naval Hospital in San Diego.

"The expeditious manner in which he carried out his assignment was a material contribution toward the success of the South and later Central Pacific offensives."

== Early life and early career ==
Price graduated in 1902 from the Pennsylvania Military College in Chester, Pennsylvania, with a degree in civil engineering and was employed after graduation at the Pennsylvania Railroad in Philadelphia, Pennsylvania.

He was commissioned a second lieutenant in the Marine Corps in February 1906 and ordered to the School of Application at Annapolis, Maryland for instruction. Within six months the revolt in Cuba heated up, and President Theodore Roosevelt ordered a Marine expeditionary force to Cuba in September. This force included Price, and he remained in Cuba with the Army of Pacification until 31 December 1908. Two months before transferring back to stateside duty, he was promoted to first lieutenant.

In January 1909, Lt Price served at the Marine Barracks, Navy Yard, Washington, D.C., for a brief period before being ordered to expeditionary duty in Central America. After serving in Nicaragua a few months, the expedition settled in Panama in 1910 during the construction of the Panama Canal.

Price returned to the United States in April 1910, and was ordered to duty at the Rifle Range, Winthrop, Maryland. He assumed command of that post a few months after his arrival. He served in this position for three years and then three more at Winthrop, Maryland, as adjutant of the Basic School for Marine Officers at Portsmouth, Virginia. He also went on temporary foreign shore duty in Mexico, where he took part in the landing of Marines at Veracruz during the Mexican Intervention of 1914.

Price received his promotion to captain on 25 September 1916. Two months after his promotion, he became commanding officer, Marine Detachment, USS Arkansas.

== World War I ==
Price was promoted to major in May, 1917 and sailed for Brest, France, in October, 1918.

After the armistice, Price remained in France as the commander of the 15th Separate Battalion, that had been organized for expeditionary duty in Europe.

Upon his return to the U.S. he entered the Field Officers' Course, Marine Corps Schools, Quantico, Virginia, and graduated in June, 1922.

He eventually received diplomas from the Line and General Staff School at Fort Leavenworth, Kansas, for the years 1922 and 1923 where he also served several months as an instructor in the Department of Tactics at the Marine Corps Schools.

== Inter-war period ==
When the United States Asiatic Fleet began maneuvers in the Hawaiian Islands in 1925, General Price was temporarily detached from Quantico in order to participate. Following the exercises he was assigned to duty as post intelligence officer and officer in charge of operations and training with the Marine detachment at the American Legation in Peking, China. He returned to Quantico in September 1927.

Following the signing of peace in Nicaragua, Price helped supervise the elections. He joined the Second Brigade Marines in Nicaragua in July, 1928 as a member of the American Electoral Mission. For his outstanding work he received praise from President Calvin Coolidge, the Secretary of State and from the Nicaraguan Government. This type of work also took the Price back to Nicaragua in 1930, 1931, and 1932.

He was advanced to lieutenant colonel in October 1931.

Price assumed command of the Rifle Range, Quantico from December 1932 to August 1934, and he had participated in fleet maneuvers aboard the USS Wyoming (BB-32) at Culebra, Puerto Rico.

== China duty ==
Lt Col Price joined the Fourth Marines at the American Legation in Shanghai, China on 25 April 1935 and served there during the Sino-Japanese fighting until November 1938. The Secretary of the Navy awarded him the Navy Distinguished Service Medal for his excellent tact, judgement, initiative, and administrative ability of a high order, in handling the situation at Shanghai, where the major Chinese forces defending Shanghai made their last stand.

Following his return to the U.S., the president promoted him to brigadier general effective 1 August 1940 while he served as a member of the Naval Examining Board at Marine Corps Headquarters in Washington, DC.

== World War II ==
On 15 February 1941 then Brigadier General Price assumed command of the Department of the Pacific with headquarters in San Francisco. On 1 November 1941 he was placed in command of the Second Marine Division in addition to his duties in San Francisco. The president promoted him to major general on 1 February 1942 at the conclusion of this assignment.

He assumed command of the Defense Force, Samoan Group, in April 1942. In May 1944, he assumed command of the San Diego Area, and later to his last command at the Marine Training and Replacement Command.

He entered the retired list on 1 October 1945. On 25 October 1948 he was advanced on the retired list to lieutenant general for having been specially commended in the performance of duty in actual combat.

== Awards and decorations ==

1st Row	Navy Distinguished Service Medal			
2nd Row	Legion of Merit with "V" Device	Navy and Marine Corps Presidential Unit Citation with one star	Marine Corps Expeditionary Medal with one service star	Cuban Pacification Medal
3rd Row	Mexican Campaign Medal	World War I Victory Medal	Second Nicaraguan Campaign Medal	China Service Medal
4th Row	American Defense Service Medal with one star	American Campaign Medal	Asiatic-Pacific Campaign Medal with three service stars	World War II Victory Medal
