= Robert H. Pepper =

U.S. Marine Corps Lieutenant General

Robert Houston Pepper
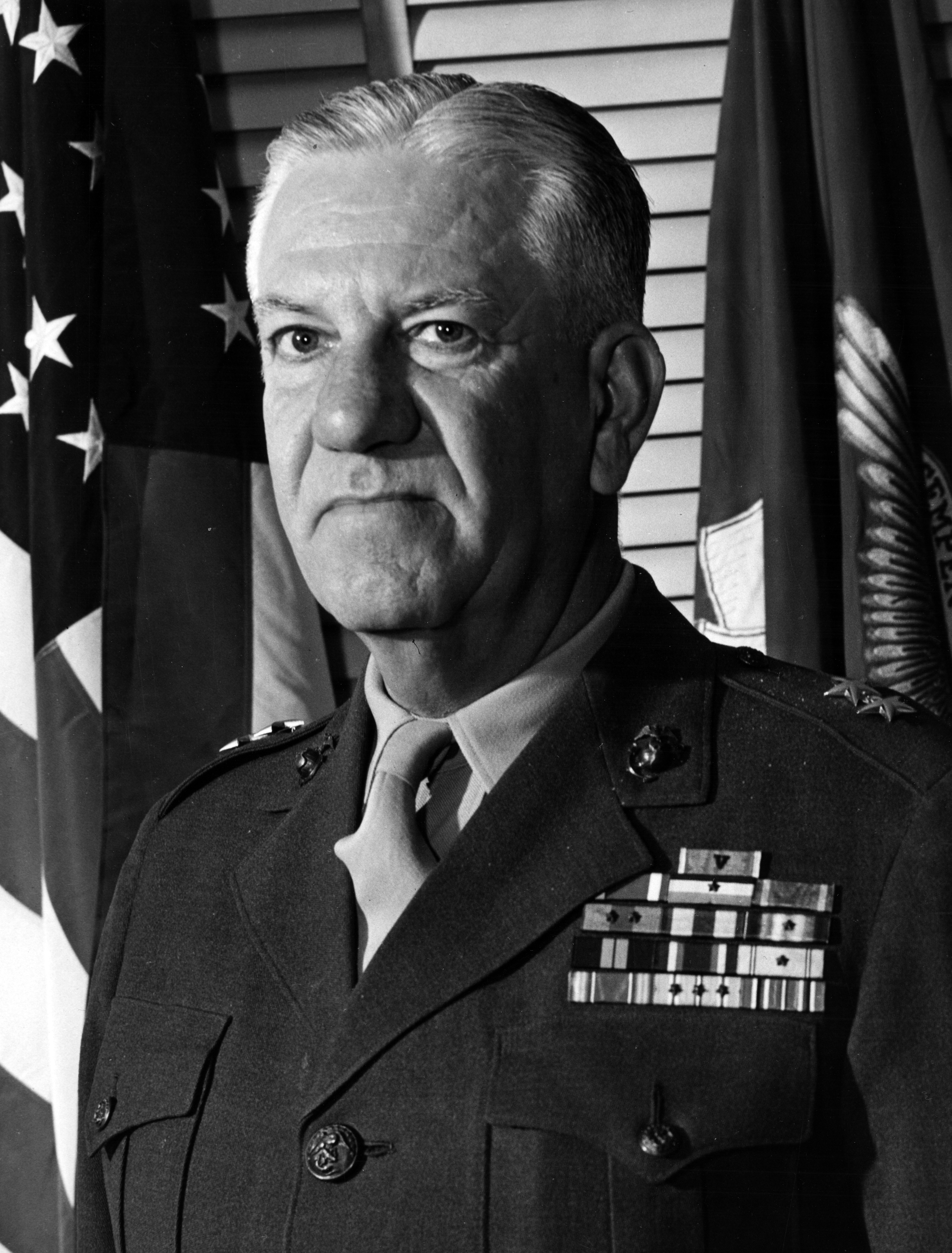
- Robert H. Pepper as MG
- Born: April 22, 1895; Georgetown, Delaware, U.S.
- Died: June 1, 1968 (aged 73); Arlington County, Virginia, U.S.
- Burial place: Arlington National Cemetery
- Military career
- Allegiance: United States of America
- Branch: United States Marine Corps
- Service years: 1917–1957, 1961–1962
- Rank: Lieutenant general
- Service number: 0-755
- Commands: Fleet Marine Force, Pacific; 3rd Marine Division; 1st Marine Division; MCRD Parris Island; Department of the Pacific; 11th Marine Regiment; 3rd Defense Battalion
- Conflicts: World War I Haitian Campaign; Yangtze Patrol; World War II: Attack on Pearl Harbor; Battle of Tulagi; Battle for Henderson Field; Battle of Guadalcanal; Battle of Cape Gloucester; Korean War
- Awards: Legion of Merit; Navy Commendation Medal

Robert Houston Pepper (April 22, 1895 – June 1, 1968) was an officer of the United States Marine Corps with the rank of lieutenant general, who is most noted for his work in the development of the Marine defense battalions during World War II and later as commanding general of the Fleet Marine Force, Pacific or 3rd Marine Division.

== Early career ==
Robert H. Pepper was born on April 22, 1895, in Georgetown, Delaware, as the son of James Nutter Pepper, Jr. and his wife Margaret B. Simpler. Following his high school studies, he attended the University of Delaware in Newark and graduated with Bachelor of Arts degree in June 1917. Pepper was commissioned second lieutenant on August 6, 1917, and subsequently attended basic training at Marine Officers School at Quantico, Virginia.

During November of that year, Pepper was attached to the 1st Provisional Marine Brigade under the command of John H. Russell Jr. and sailed for his first expeditionary duty in Haiti. He served in Caribbean until January 1920 and took part in many jungle patrols against hostile rebels called "Cacos". During his time in Haiti, he was promoted to the rank of first lieutenant on July 1, 1918.

Following his return stateside, Pepper was attached again to the Marine Barracks Quantico, where he attended Company Officers Course within Marine Corps Schools there. He finished the course in May 1920 and sailed to France, where he was tasked with the preparations of World War I battlefields maps. Pepper was assigned to that mission until December 1920 and then returned to the United States and again to Quantico.

In April 1922, Pepper was ordered back to Caribbean and appointed Aide to the American High Commissioner in Haiti, Brigadier General John H. Russell. Pepper was then ordered stateside in August 1924 in order to attend Army Motor Transportation School at Camp Holabird, Maryland. He was meanwhile promoted to the rank of captain on August 20, 1924. Upon graduation from this school in June 1925, Pepper was transferred to Marine Corps Base San Diego, California and attached to the 4th Marine Regiment. His regiment finally sailed for China in February 1927 and Pepper later took part in guard duties at Shanghai International Settlement.

Upon his return from China in July 1929, Pepper was appointed an instructor at the Correspondence School at Quantico Base until the beginning of June 1931. In August of that year, Pepper assumed duties as commanding officer of the Marine detachment aboard the battleship USS Oklahoma and spent next two years with patrol cruises along the West coast.

Pepper returned to San Diego in August 1933 and later was transferred to the Marine Barracks Parris Island, South Carolina. He was sent to the Army Coast Artillery School at Fort Monroe, Virginia, during July 1934 and subsequently graduated from the course in June 1935. Pepper was promoted to the rank of major at the same time and assumed duties as Artillery Assistant in the War Plans Section, Division of Plans and Policies, Headquarters Marine Corps.

While in this capacity, Pepper met Lieutenant Colonel Charles D. Barrett and they drew up together the concept of Marine defense battalions, which were designated for the Anti-aircraft and coastal defense of the islands in the Pacific Ocean.

== World War II ==
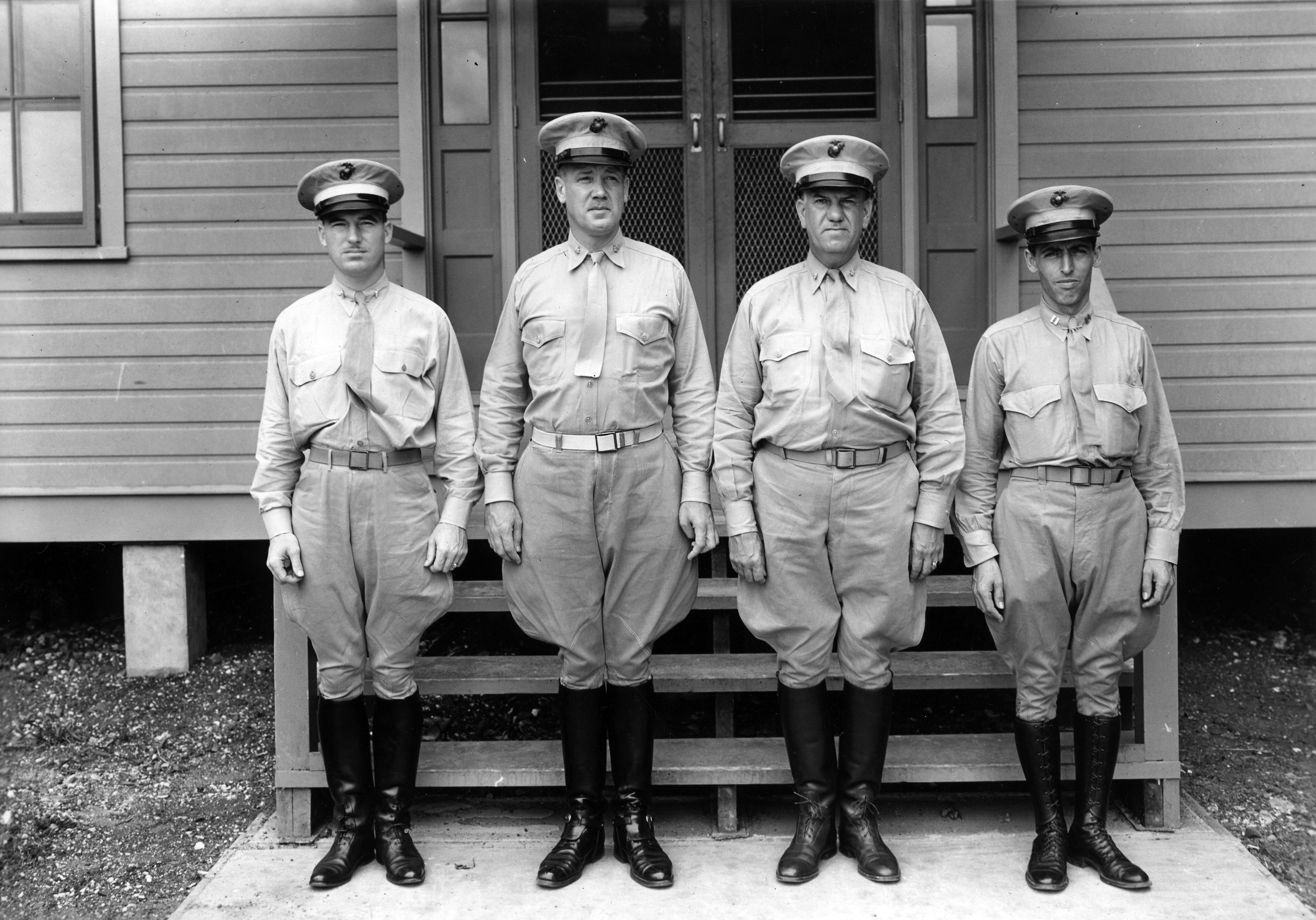
Lieutenant Colonel Robert H. Pepper (second from right) with the staff of 3rd Defense Battalion on Hawaii

Lieutenant Colonel Pepper left Washington, D.C. in June 1939 and returned to the Parris Island, where he assumed duties as commanding officer of 1st Battalion, 15th Marine Regiment. However his command was redesignated 3rd Defense Battalion on October 10, 1939, and Pepper assumed command of this new unit. For his new command, he was promoted to the rank of lieutenant colonel on October 1, 1939. He then spent next year with extensive training and then sailed for Pearl Harbor in April 1940. Pepper was replaced in command by Colonel Harry K. Pickett at the end of August 1940 and subsequently took part in the preparation of defense at Midway Atoll.

He returned to the command of 3rd Defense Battalion at the beginning of February 1941 and returned to Hawaii, where his battalion was tasked with defense of the islands. During the Japanese Attack on Pearl Harbor on 7 December 1941, Pepper sailed together with Colonel Gilder D. Jackson Jr. aboard the heavy cruiser USS Indianapolis to Johnston Atoll to observe the testing of new Higgins boat.

Pepper was promoted to the rank of colonel in May 1942 and his unit subsequently sailed to Guadalcanal at the beginning of August 1942 in order to reinforce 1st Marine Division under Major General Alexander Vandegrift. He took part in the Battle of Tulagi and 3rd Defense Battalion under his command successfully hit three enemy ships that had beached themselves to land troops.

He later took part in the Battle for Henderson Field at the end of October 1942 and his battalion defensed the Lunga Point against the enemy counterattack from the sea. Pepper remained in command of 3rd Defense Battalion until March 15, 1943, when he was relieved by his executive officer, Lieutenant Colonel Harold C. Roberts. For his service on Guadalcanal, Pepper was decorated with the Legion of Merit with Combat "V".

Pepper was subsequently transferred to the staff of the 11th Marine Artillery Regiment located in Australia for rest and refit after heavy combats on Guadalcanal. He relieved Colonel Pedro del Valle as commanding officer on March 29, 1943, and led his regiment to New Britain in December of that year. Pepper went ashore during Gloucester operation on December 26 and his regiment met light opposition at the beginning of campaign. His regiment struggled with difficult terrain, which was improper for the deployment of artillery units. The 11th Marines subsequently provided support fire for the advancing marine units during the assault on airdrome and later during the attack on Aogiri Ridge.

Colonel Pepper has been relieved by William H. Harrison at the end of January 1944 and subsequently returned to the United States the following month. After one month of medical leave, Pepper was appointed chief of staff to the commanding general of Camp Lejeune, Major General John Marston. This facility served as boot camp, and Pepper was co-responsible for the training of replacement troops for the marine units deployed overseas.

He was also promoted to the rank of brigadier general at the same time. Pepper remained in this capacity until June 1945. For his service in this capacity and his great administrative skills, he was decorated with Navy Commendation Medal.

== Later career ==
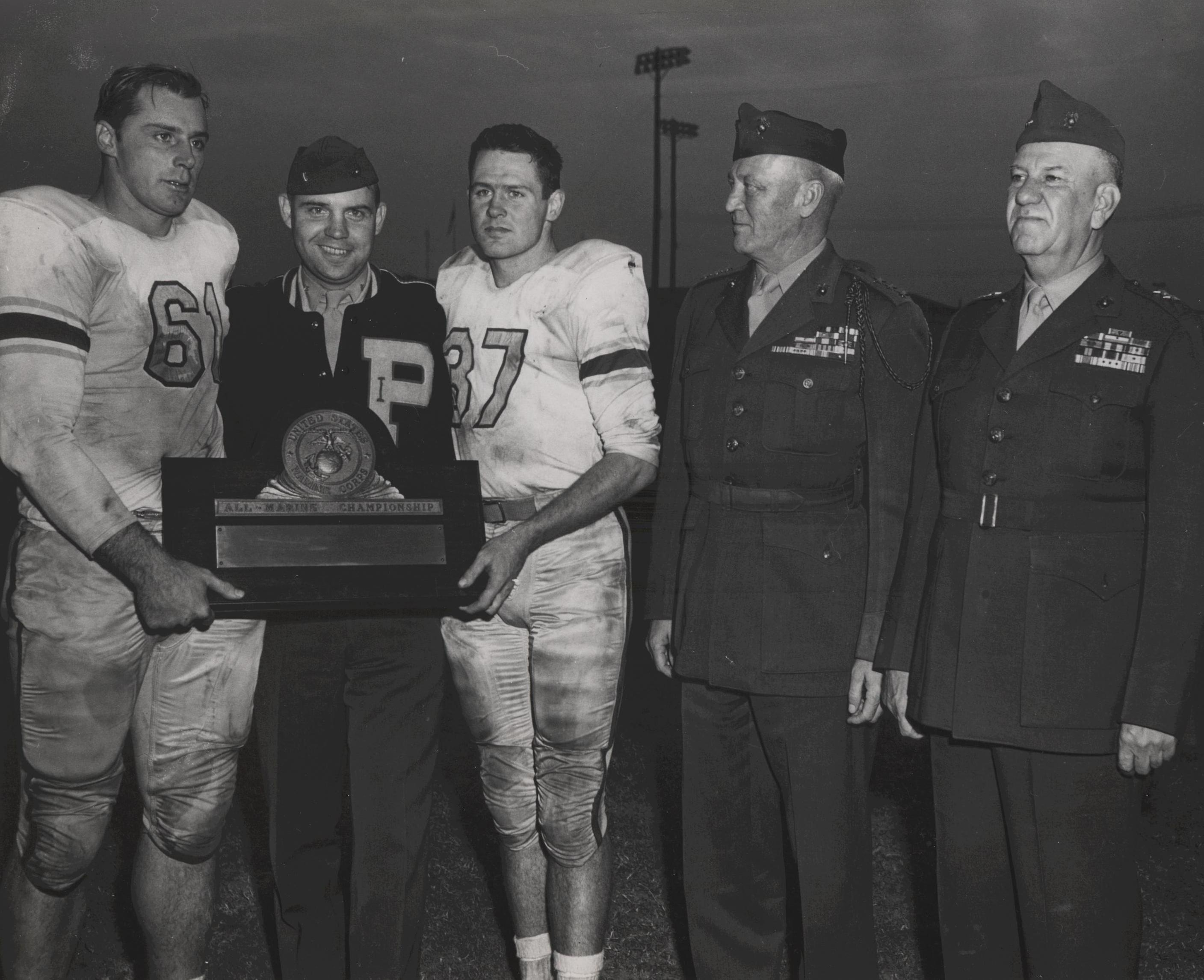
CPT Don King; Parris Island Head Coach, MJR John T. Hill; CPT Billy Hayes; Lieutenant General Graves B. Erskine (Fleet Marine Force, Atlantic) at the Norfolk Naval Base and Major General Robert H. Pepper (MCRDPI), 1952 – All Marine Champions

Pepper was then ordered back to the Pacific and assigned to the staff V Amphibious Corps under Major General Harry Schmidt as Corps Artillery Commander. He remained in that capacity until November 1945, when he was transferred to the staff of Fleet Marine Force Pacific on Hawaii. Pepper was appointed deputy chief of staff under the command of Lieutenant General Roy Geiger.

He was ordered to the United States in May 1946 and assumed duties as assistant director of personnel at Headquarters Marine Corps. In February 1948, Pepper was promoted to the capacity of director of personnel and spent another year and half in that assignment.

During the end of May 1949, Pepper was transferred to Troop Training Unit, Amphibious Training Command, Atlantic Fleet at Little Creek, Virginia, and relieved Brigadier General William A. Worton as its commanding general. In this capacity, he was responsible for the amphibious training of all ground forces within United States Atlantic Fleet.

In August 1950, Pepper has been promoted to the rank of major general and assumed duties as commanding general of the Marine Corps Recruit Depot Parris Island, South Carolina. He was responsible for the training of new recruits for next year and half and subsequently relinquished command to his deputy, Brigadier General Matthew C. Horner at the end of January 1952. He was then ordered to Camp Pendleton, California, and assumed command of newly activated 3rd Marine Division.

The 3rd Division was reactivated because of the communists threat during the ongoing Korean War and subsequently ordered to Okinawa, Japan, in August 1952. Pepper commanded his division during the several amphibious exercises in Japan and his unit served as defense force of the Far Eastern area.

Pepper was transferred to Korea at the beginning of May 1954, and assumed command of 1st Marine Division. His new command was tasked with the defense of Korean Demilitarized Zone, but Pepper did not stay long. He was sent to Hawaii, where he assumed command of Fleet Marine Force, Pacific, which included two-thirds of the Marine Corps Combat forces at the time. For his new command, he was promoted to the temporary rank of lieutenant general at the same time.

He was transferred to San Francisco at the end of September 1955 and relieved Major general Henry D. Linscott as commander of Department of the Pacific. Pepper was also reverted to the rank of major general. He spent two years with the training and administration of Marine units along the West Coast and finally retired from active service on May 1, 1957, after 40 years of service. He was advanced again to the rank of lieutenant general for having been specially commended in combat.

== Retirement ==
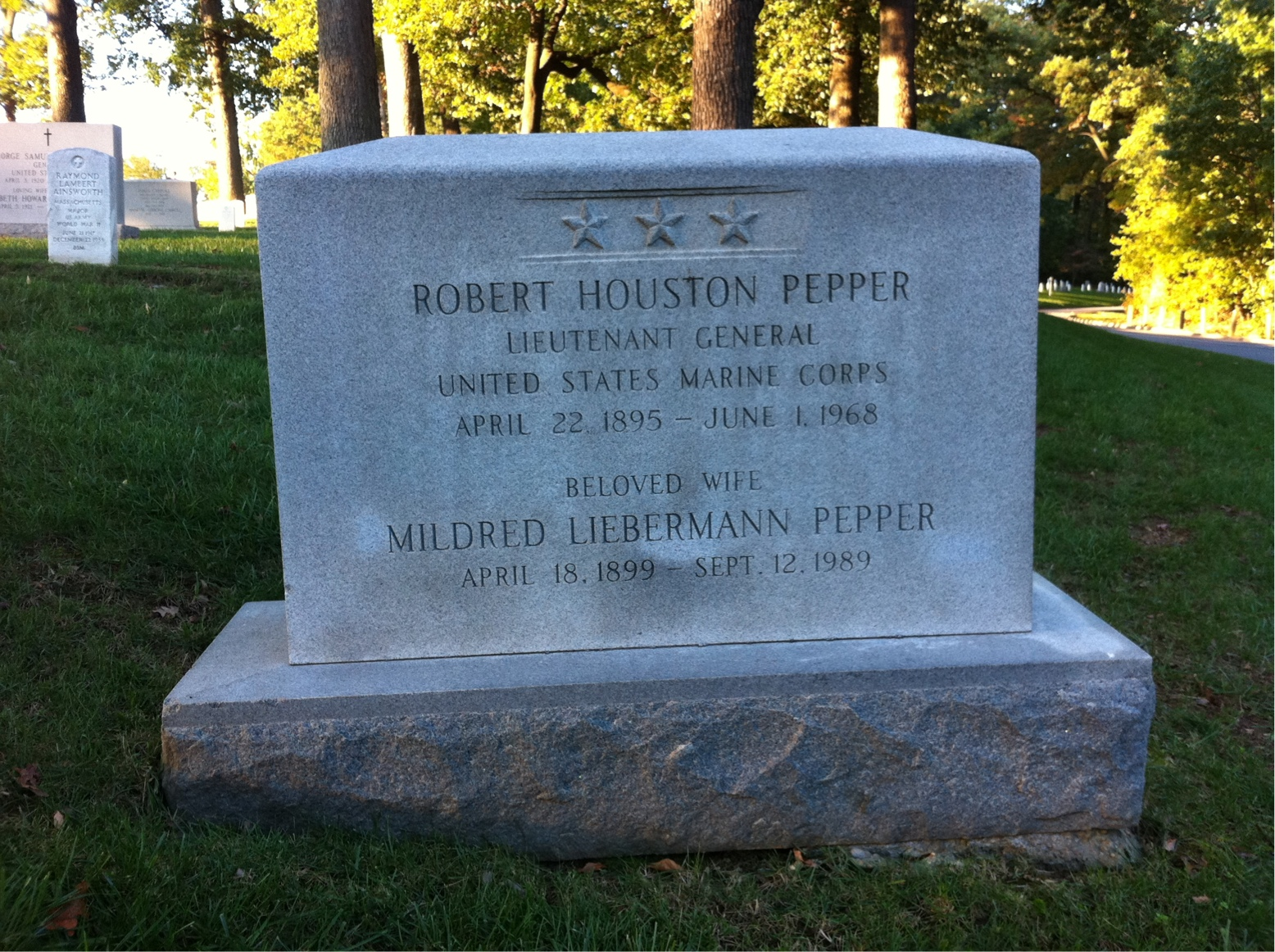
Grave at Arlington National Cemetery

His retirement did not last long, because Pepper was recalled to active duty in July 1960, when he was appointed Marine Corps member of Bolte Committee, which was tasked to study Officer Personnel Act from 1947. In May 1961, Pepper was appointed senior member of the Headquarters Marine Corps Reorganization Board and subsequently member of Department of Defense Study group on Military compensation.

Pepper died on June 1, 1968, in Arlington County, Virginia. He is buried at Arlington National Cemetery together with his wife Mildred Liebermann Pepper (1899–1989).

== Decorations ==
Here is the ribbon bar of Lieutenant General Robert H. Pepper:

1st Row	Legion of Merit with Combat "V"		Navy Commendation Medal	Navy Presidential Unit Citation with one star
2nd Row	Navy Unit Commendation	Marine Corps Expeditionary Medal with two stars	World War I Victory Medal with West Indies clasp	Haitian Campaign Medal
3rd Row	Yangtze Service Medal	American Defense Service Medal with Base Clasp	Asiatic-Pacific Campaign Medal with three 3/16 inch service stars	American Campaign Medal
4th Row	World War II Victory Medal	National Defense Service Medal with one star	Korean Service Medal	United Nations Korea Medal

Military offices
Preceded by Franklin A. Hart	Commanding General of the Fleet Marine Force, Pacific; August 1954 – September 1955	Succeeded by William O. Brice
Preceded by Randolph M. Pate	Commanding General of the 1st Marine Division; May 12, 1954 – July 23, 1954	Succeeded by Robert E. Hogaboom
Preceded by Merrill B. Twining	Commanding General of the 3rd Marine Division; February 15, 1952 – May 9, 1954	Succeeded by James P. Riseley
Preceded by Lester S. Hamel	Commanding General of the MCRD Parris Island; August 17, 1950 - January 29, 1952	Succeeded by Matthew C. Horner
