= Logan Feland =

United States Marine Corps general

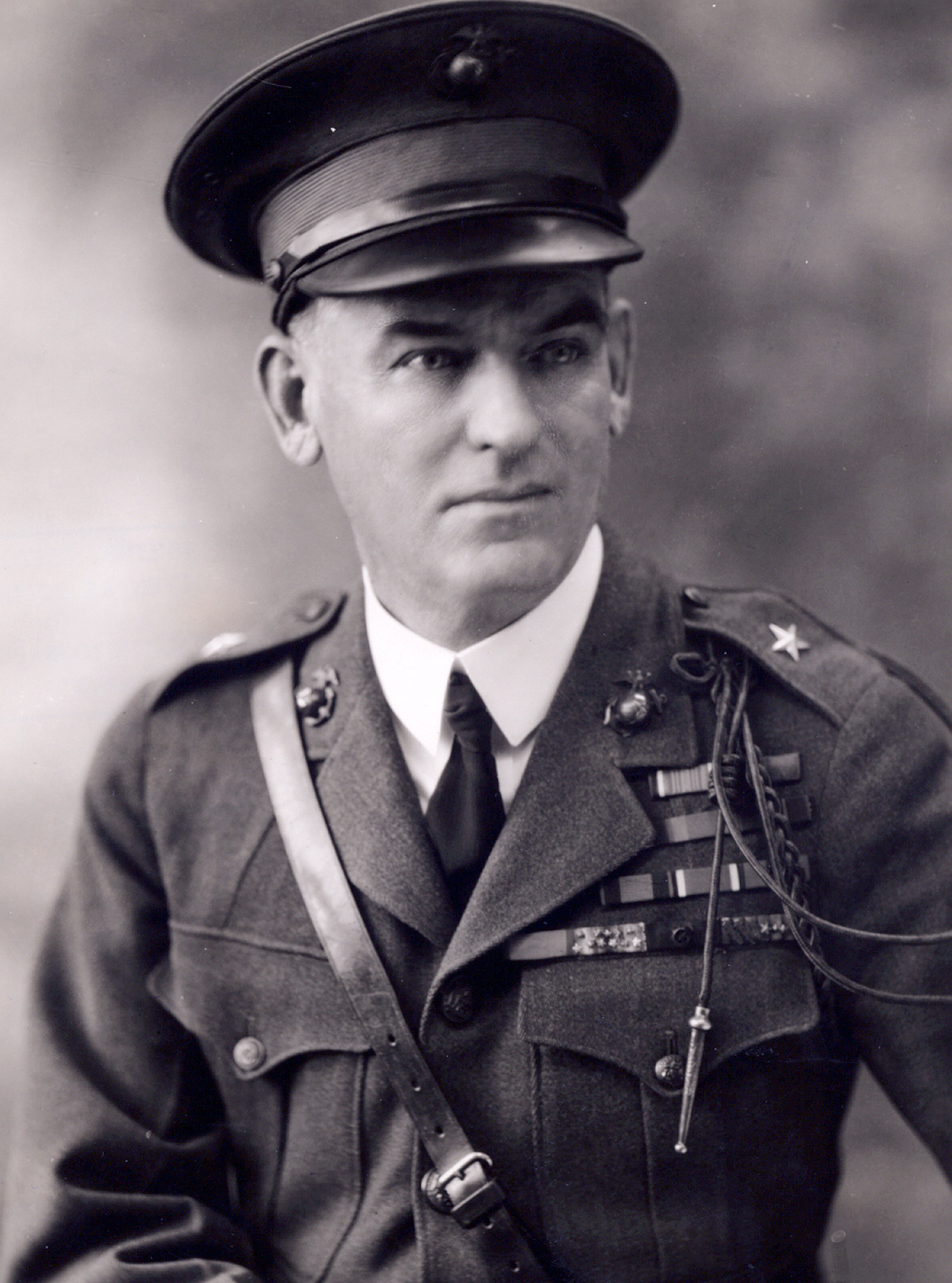
- Born: August 11, 1869; Hopkinsville, Kentucky, U.S.
- Died: July 17, 1936 (aged 66); Columbus, Ohio, U.S.
- Military career
- Allegiance: United States of America
- Branch: United States Marine Corps
- Service years: 1898–1899 (Volunteer Infantry); 1899-1933 (USMC)
- Rank: Major General
- Commands: Department of the Pacific
- Conflicts: Spanish–American War; World War I *Battle of Belleau Wood; *Battle of Soissons; *Battle of Blanc Mont Ridge; *Battle of Argonne Forest; Banana Wars
- Awards: Distinguished Service Cross; Distinguished Service Medal; Army Distinguished Service Medal; Silver Star (5); Legion of Honor; Croix de Guerre

Major General Logan Feland (18 August 1869 – 17 July 1936) was a United States Marine Corps general who last served as commanding general of the Department of the Pacific. Feland served during the Spanish–American War (3rd Kentucky Volunteer Infantry), the occupation of Veracruz (1914) and in World War I, where he was in command of all troops during the Battle of Belleau Wood.

== Biography ==
Logan Feland was born in Hopkinsville, Kentucky, on August 18, 1869. He studied at Hopkinsville High School and South Kentucky College. He received a B.A. in architecture from the Massachusetts Institute of Technology in 1892. He married Katherine Cordner on February 14, 1907.

During the Spanish–American War, he was the captain of Company F, 3rd Kentucky Infantry, from May 31, 1898, until May 16, 1899, when he was honorably mustered out. By virtue of his previous military experience, he was appointed directly to the rank of first lieutenant in the Marine Corps on 1 July 1899.

Feland was promoted to captain, 3 March 1903; to major, 29 August 1916; to lieutenant colonel, 26 March 1917; to colonel 1 July 1918; to brigadier general, 9 March 1919; and to major general, 1 October 1931.

In the grades of lieutenant and captain he served with Marine Detachments on USS Oregon (BB-3), Massachusetts, Indiana, Minnesota, and Montana. Prior to World War I he had more than eight years of foreign duty including service in Panama in 1904 and in 1911; expeditions to Guantanamo Bay in 1904, 1911, 1912, and 1913; San Juan, Puerto Rico, in 1904; service with the Army of Cuban Pacification in 1906; service in Santo Domingan waters in 1912; Culebra in 1914; and the occupation of Vera Cruz, Mexico, in 1914. His home service was equally varied and included duty at Marine Barracks, Washington, D.C., League Island (Philadelphia), Narragansett Bay, Rhode Island, Norfolk, and New York; instruction in submarine mining at the Torpedo Station, Narragansett Bay; teaching in the School of Application, Annapolis, and the Advanced Base School, New London, Connecticut; observation of Army artillery practice at Fortress Monroe, Virginia; the supervising of construction of new barracks at Annapolis; and recruiting in New York.

=== World War I ===
Feland was attached to the 5th Marine Regiment for service in France in World War I and was among the first contingent of American forces which went overseas with General John J. Pershing in May 1917. On his arrival in France, Feland was made executive officer (XO) of the 5th Marines. When the unit, as part of the 4th Marine Brigade, was thrown into the breach to stem the German advance at Château-Thierry in May 1918, Feland was, as ever, in the thick of the fighting. At Belleau Wood in June 1918 when the halt in the German advance was turned into a retreat, Feland was given command of all troops in the Wood. For his conspicuous valor on this occasion, he was awarded the Distinguished Service Cross. After his promotion to colonel, Feland became commanding officer (CO) of the 5th Marine Regiment after the former CO, Wendell Cushing Neville, was promoted to command the 4th Marine Brigade. As such, he led it in the Battles of Soissons, Blanc Mont Ridge and in the Argonne. For his outstanding exploits in the War, Feland was awarded, in addition to the Distinguished Service Cross mentioned above, the Distinguished Service Medals of both the Army and the Navy, Officer's rank in the Legion of Honor, the Croix de Guerre with bronze star, gold star, and four palms, and was cited in dispatches six times.

Upon his return to the United States in May 1919, Feland was stationed at Headquarters Marine Corps until December when he was detached to command the 2nd Brigade in Santo Domingo. Returning to the United States the following fall, he again joined Headquarters in the capacity of Director of the Division of Operations and Training. He held that post for two years after which he was Assistant to the Major General Commandant for another two years. From November 1926 to February 1927 he was called from his command of the Marine Expeditionary Force at Quantico to head the Eastern Section of the U.S. Mail Guard.

In April 1927, Feland took command of the 2nd Brigade in Nicaragua. After four months in Nicaragua he was transferred to the command of Marine Barracks, Parris Island, South Carolina, which post he held from September 1927 to January 1928. He then returned to Nicaragua and assumed command of the Brigade for a second time, serving there until March 1929. For this second tour in Nicaragua, Feland was awarded another Distinguished Service Medal.

Following a short period at Headquarters after his return from Nicaragua, Feland was assigned as commanding general of the Department of the Pacific in July 1929. He was serving in that position when he was detached on 25 February 1933. He retired from the Marine Corps on 1 September 1933.

Feland died at Columbus, Ohio, on 17 July 1936. He was buried in Arlington National Cemetery.

== Awards and honors ==
Feland is the recipient of the following awards:

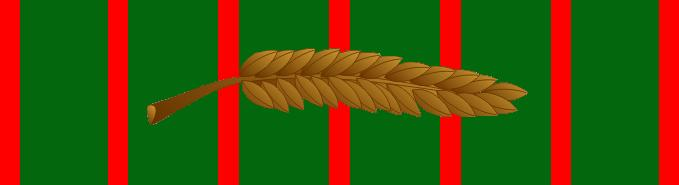

Distinguished Service Cross	Navy Distinguished Service Medal	Army Distinguished Service Medal	Silver Star with 4 Gold Stars
Marine Corps Expeditionary Medal with 2 stars	Army of Cuban Occupation Medal	Army of Puerto Rican Occupation Medal	Cuban Pacification Medal
Mexican Service Medal	World War I Victory Medal w/ 4 service stars	Legion of Honor, Officer	Croix de guerre (WWI) w/ 4 palms, 1 gold star, & 1 bronze star

=== Award citation ===
The Distinguished Service Cross is presented to Colonel Logan Feland, U.S. Marine Corps, for extraordinary heroism in action during the operations at Bois de Belleau, June 6–14, 1918. Colonel Feland distinguished himself by his energy, courage, and disregard for personal safety in voluntarily leading troops into action through heavy artillery and machine-gun fire. His efforts contributed largely to our successes at this point.

== See also ==
- Battle of Belleau Wood
