= Battle of Guadalcanal order of battle =

World War II battle order

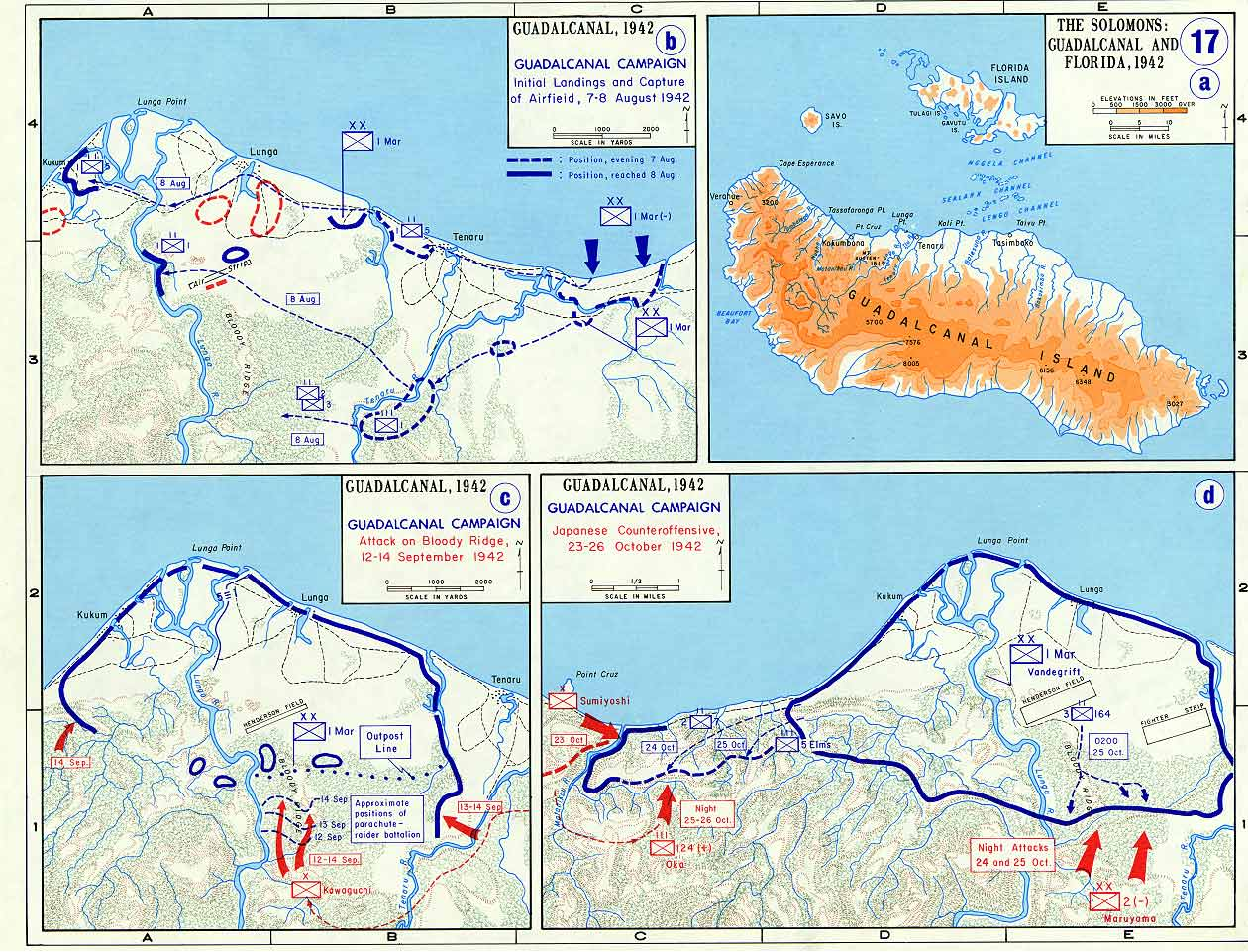
Maps of Guadalcanal Island; the great majority of the fighting took place in a small sliver of land along the north central coast.

This is the order of battle for the Guadalcanal campaign, called Operation Watchtower, the first major Allied offensive in the Pacific Theater of Operations in World War II. The campaign lasted from the initial American landings on 7 August 1942 until the final Japanese evacuation on 9 February 1943, a period of six months, far longer than was expected by Allied planners.

The 7 August landings on Guadalcanal itself and Tulagi across Savo Sound (the site of a Japanese seaplane base) were carried out by US Marines under the command of Major General Alexander A. Vandegrift. These were followed by units of the Naval Construction Battalions, known as CB's or Seabees.

Forces of the US Army began arriving to relieve the exhausted Marines on 13 October. On 8 December Vandegrift was replaced by Major General Alexander M. Patch, US Army, who was named commander of the XIV Army Corps on 2 January 1943. Patch declared the island secure on 9 February.

The high command of the Imperial Japanese Army did not take initially the Allied effort on Guadalcanal seriously and committed units piecemeal throughout the fall of 1942. Over the course of the campaign, the Japanese subjected two entire infantry divisions to massive attrition on the island.

1st Marine Division patch

The 1st Marine Division's struggle to take Guadalcanal achieved legendary status: the heat and mud, the malaria and dysentery, the giant tropical insects and the fanatical, often suicidal, resistance of the Japanese combined to create an immense amount of sheer suffering. Today, the unit's insignia features the word "Guadalcanal" superimposed on a large red numeral 1. Three future commandants of the Marine Corps fought on "The Canal": Alexander A. Vandegrift, Clifton B. Cates and Lemuel C. Shepherd. Vandegrift was awarded the Medal of Honor the following year in recognition of his courage and extraordinary leadership during the Corps's four-month struggle.

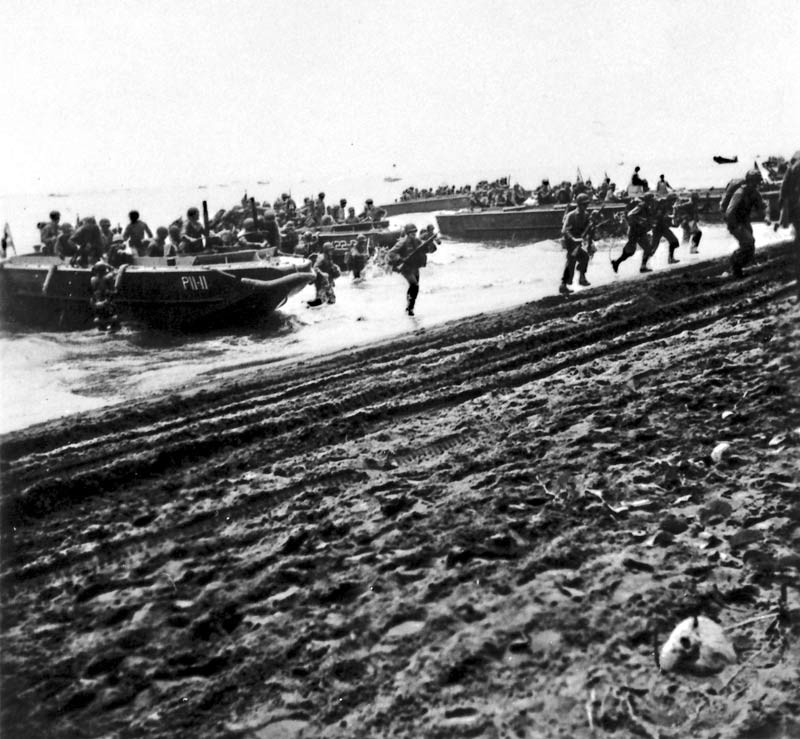
Marines landing unopposed on the north shore of Guadalcanal 7 August 1942.

Why does the mere mention of the southwest Pacific cause the men who fought there to shudder? Why does so genteel an author as Herman Wouk, whipped into a white-lipped rage at the mere thought of Guadalcanal, write that it "was and remains 'that fucking island'"? Why was combat there considered — correctly – worse than Stalingrad?

— William Manchester, Goodbye, Darkness: A Memoir of the Pacific War (1980), p. 79

In addition to the action on the ground, the United States Navy and Imperial Japanese Navy fought several vicious and costly surface engagements at night in the waters of Savo Sound. Two nights after the initial landings, the US Navy experienced the worst open-water defeat in its history at the Battle of Savo Island. By the time the Japanese had given up on Guadalcanal, they had lost 2 battleships, 2 heavy cruisers and 7 destroyers; Allied losses included 5 heavy cruisers (one of which was Australian), 2 light cruisers and a destroyer. Each side had an admiral killed in combat. After the war, the area was renamed Ironbottom Sound in reference to the number of ships sunk there.

== United States ==
Theater commanders for Operation Watchtower

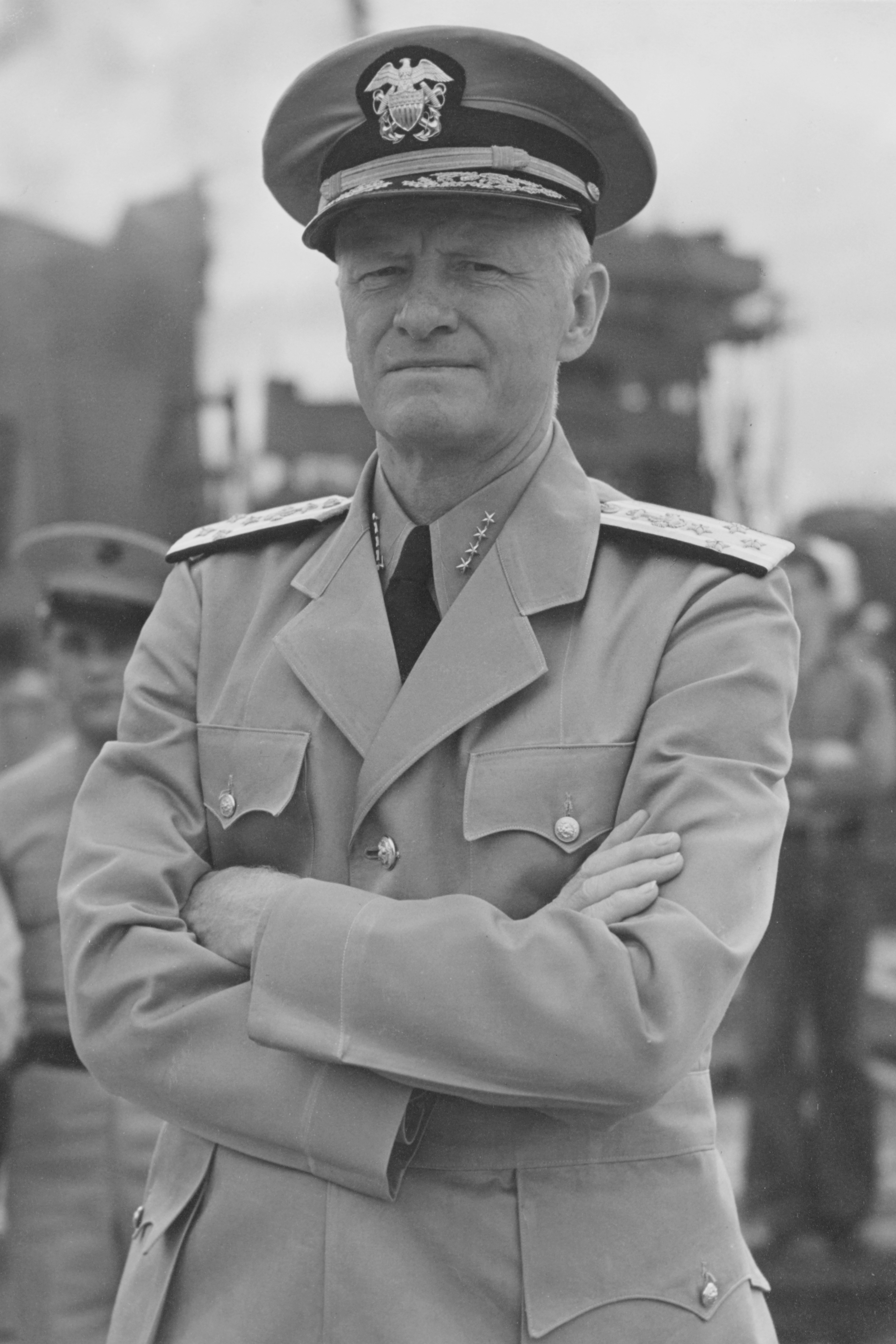
Adm. Chester W. Nimitz

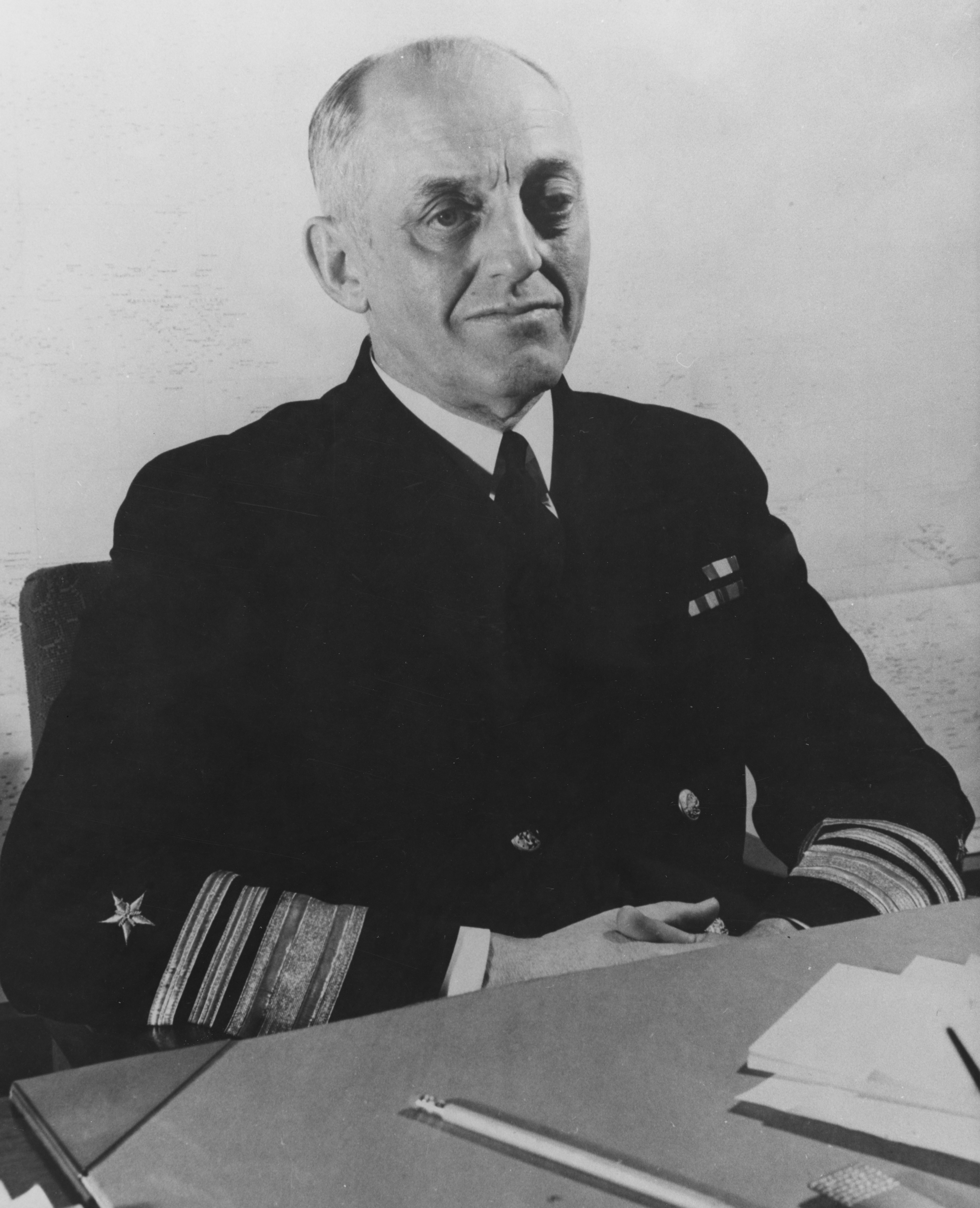
Vice Adm. Robert L. Ghormley (thru 18 Oct)

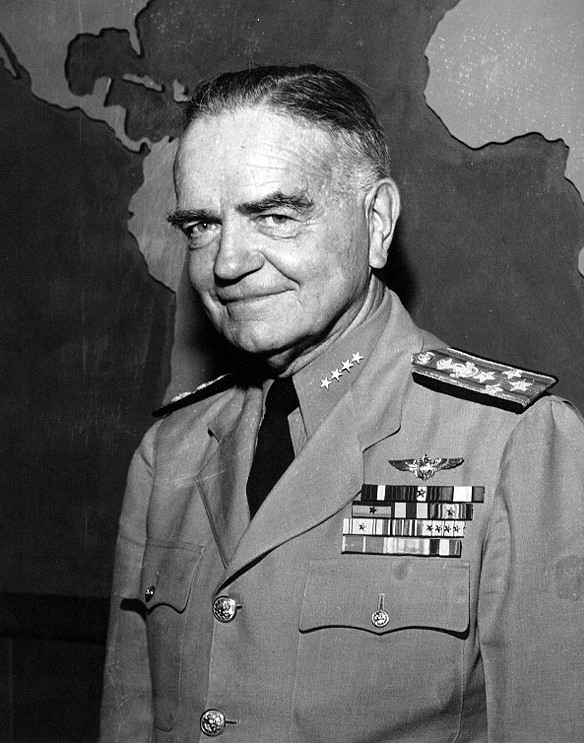
Vice Adm. William F. Halsey (after 18 Oct)

Operational commanders

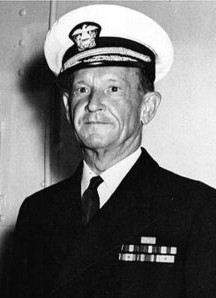
Vice Adm. Frank Jack Fletcher

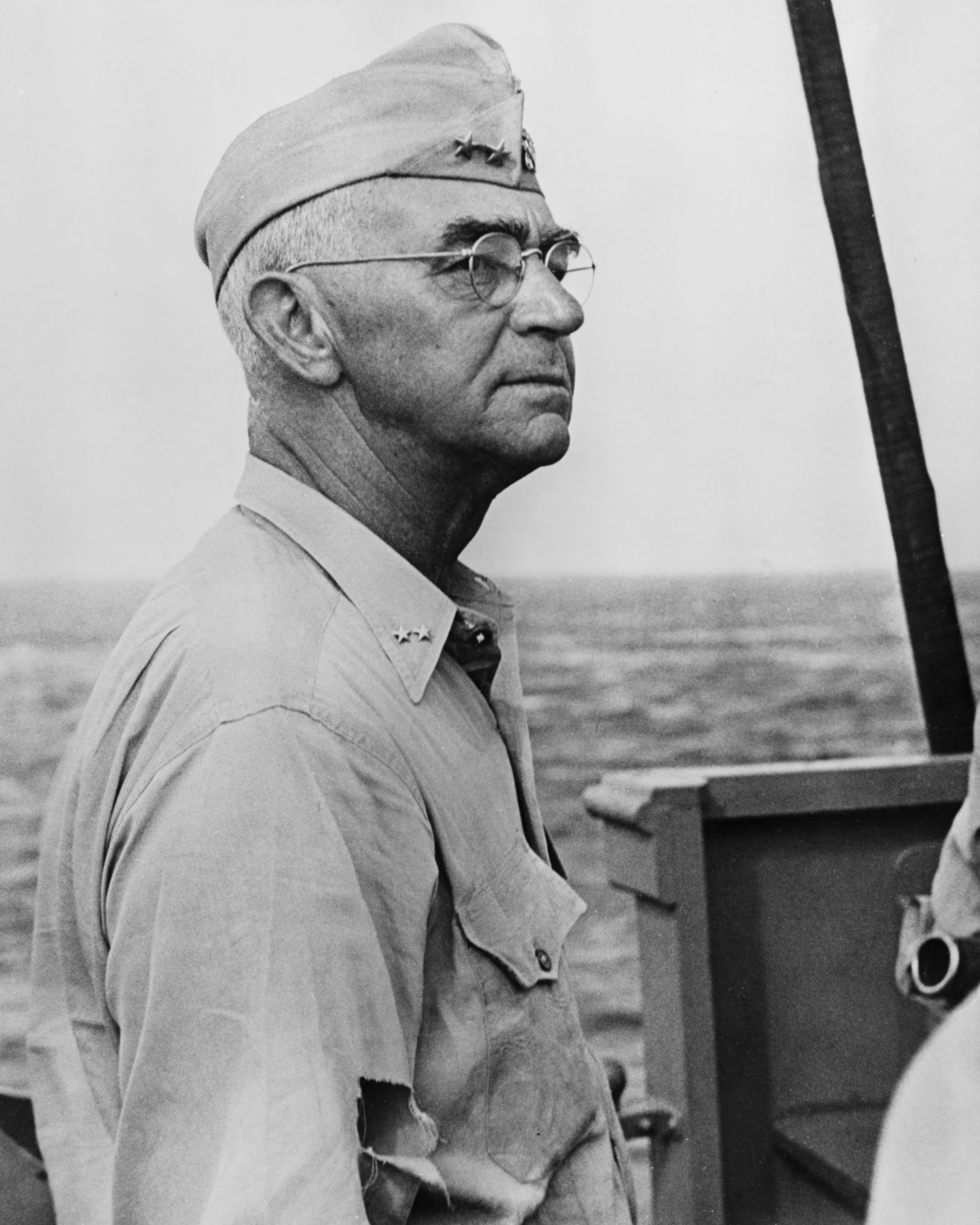
Rear Adm. R. Kelly Turner

=== Theater command ===
The roles of Commander in Chief, Pacific Ocean Areas (CINCPOA) and Commander in Chief, U.S. Pacific Fleet (CINCPAC), were both exercised by Admiral Chester W. Nimitz from his headquarters at Pearl Harbor, Hawaii.

Since the Solomons lie in the Southern Pacific, the landings of 7 August 1942 on Guadalcanal were the responsibility of the South Pacific Fleet, led by Vice Admiral Robert L. Ghormley from his headquarters at Nouméa, New Caledonia. Adm. Ghormley's pessimism, inadequate staff work and unwillingness to visit the front led Adm. Nimitz to replace him with the much more aggressive and hands-on Vice Admiral William F. Halsey on 18 October 1942.

=== Operational command ===
Operational command of the invasion was assigned to Vice Admiral Frank Jack Fletcher. He also had direct command of the covering force, designated Task Force 61, where he flew his flag aboard fleet carrier Saratoga. The amphibious forces, Task Force 62, were led by Rear Admiral Richmond Kelly Turner aboard attack transport McCawley.

Bitter disputes between Vice Adm. Fletcher and Rear Adm. Turner arose during both the planning and execution of the invasion. At issue was how long Fletcher's aircraft carriers would stay in the vicinity of Guadalcanal to provide air cover for Turner's support vessels in Savo Sound. The matter came to a head on D+1 (8 August), after two days of assaults by bombers from the Japanese base at Rabaul. These attacks convinced Fletcher that his crucial aircraft carriers could not be risked in the waters of the Solomons any longer and his task force departed the area that evening. Unsettled by the removal of air cover and rattled on the morning of D+2 by the discovery that his cruiser screen had been decimated at the Battle of Savo Island, Turner ordered his vulnerable, and still half-full, cargo ships back to Nouméa around sundown 9 August. The Marine Corps forces ashore were thus left without air cover or the planned level of food and ammunition. This suboptimal outcome was at least partially attributable to the decision to vest both overall mission command and carrier task force command in the same individual (Vice Adm. Fletcher).

=== Marine forces ===
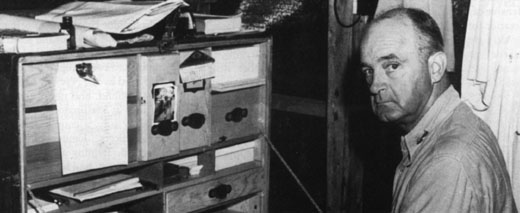
Maj. Gen. Alexander A. Vandegrift on Guadalcanal

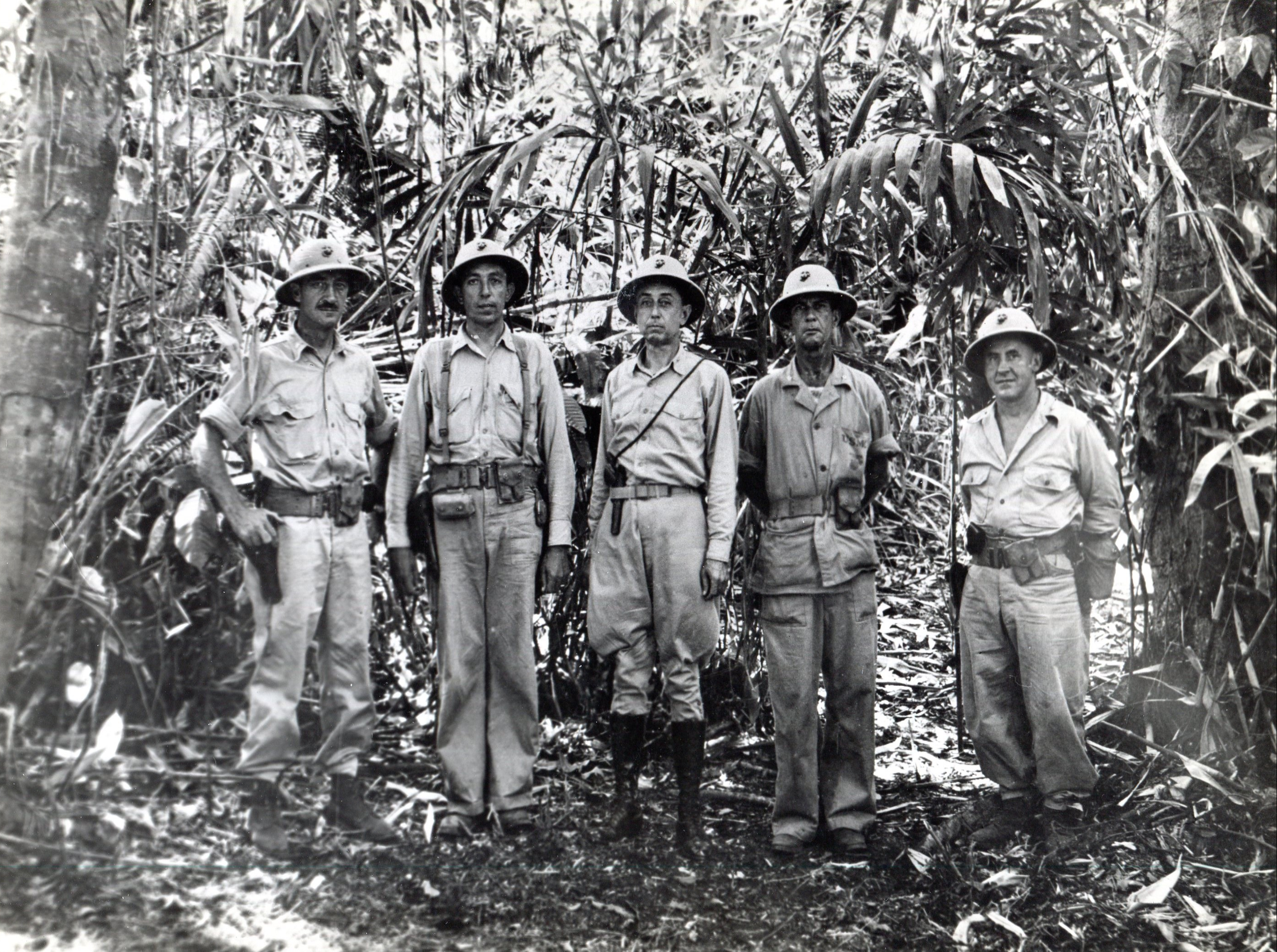
Clifton B. Cates (center) and his battalion commanders on Guadalcanal

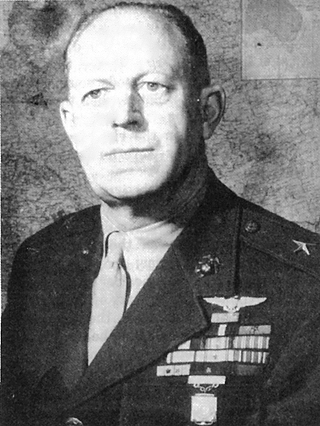
Merritt A. "Red Mike" Edson as a brigadier general

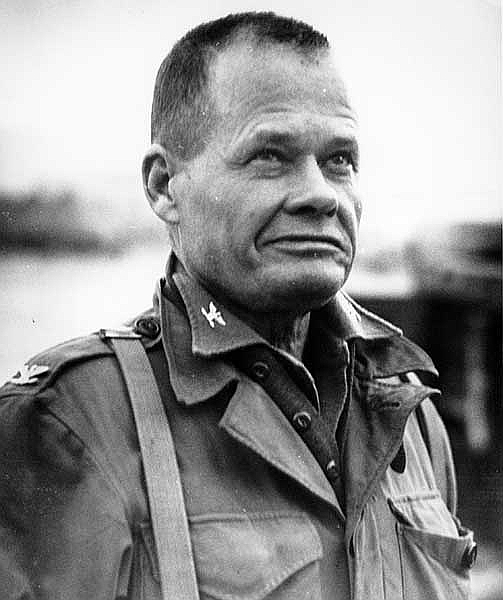
Col. Lewis B. "Chesty" Puller

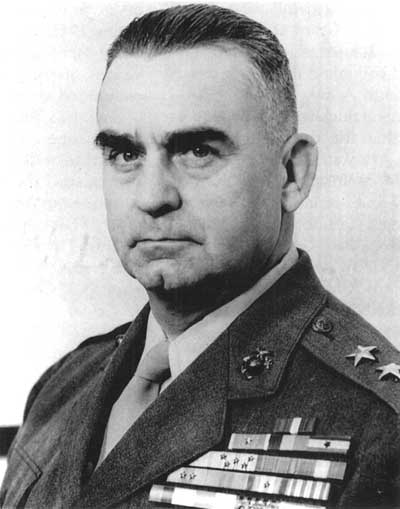
Pedro del Valle as a major general

The D-Day (7 August) landings on Guadalcanal were carried out by the 1st and 3rd Battalions/5th Marines at 0910 hours, followed by the 1st Marines at 0930. Landings on the Florida Islands across Savo Sound were carried out earlier that morning by the 2nd Battalion/5th Marines, the 1st Parachute Battalion, and the 1st Marine Raider Battalion. The 7th Marines and 1st Battalion/11th Marines arrived 18 September. The division began withdrawal from the island 12 December.

1st Marine Division
Major General Alexander A. Vandegrift (CMoH recipient) (Note: Awarded Congressional Medal of Honor 5 Feb 1943; made 18th Commandant of the Marine Corps 1 Jan 1944; promoted to four-star general 21 Mar 1945.)
Asst. Div. Cmdr.: Brigadier General William H. Rupertus (Note: Commanded division on Peleliu.)

Division staff

Chief of staff: Col. William C. James (to 24 Sep) (Note: Relieved by Vandegrift for poor performance); Col. Gerald C. Thomas (Note: Commanded the division in Korea)
Asst. CoS for Personnel (D-1): Col. Robert C. Kilmartin Jr.
Asst. CoS for Intelligence (D-2): Lt. Col. Frank B. Goettge (KIA 12 Aug) (to 12 Aug) (Note: Killed when a patrol he had organized encountered unexpected Japanese resistance and was essentially wiped out.); Lt. Col. Edmund J. Buckley
Asst. CoS for Operations (D-3): Lt. Col. Gerald C. Thomas (to 24 Sep); Lt. Col. Merrill B. Twining
Asst. CoS for Logistics (D-4): Lt. Col. Randolph M. Pate

1st Marine Regiment

Colonel Clifton B. Cates (Note: Commanded 4th Marine Division on Iwo Jima)
Exec. ofc.: Lt. Col. Julian N. Frisbie (to 23 Sep); Lt. Col. Edwin A. Pollock

1st Battalion: Lt. Col. Leonard B. Cresswell
2nd Battalion: Lt. Col. Edwin A. Pollock (to 23 Sep); Lt. Col. William W. Stickney
3rd Battalion: Lt. Col. William N. McKelvy Jr.

5th Marine Regiment

Colonel Leroy P. Hunt (to 21 Sep) (Note: Relieved by Vandegrift for poor performance; never held another combat command, but was promoted to major general and commanded the 2nd Marine Division after the war.) (Note: International News Service correspondent Richard Tregaskis, whose best-selling Guadalcanal Diary related his experiences during the first seven weeks of the campaign, was attached to this headquarters.) ; Colonel Merritt A. Edson (Note: Later commanded Fleet Marine Force, Pacific)
Exec. ofc.: Col. William J. Whaling (to 25 Sep); Lt. Col. Walker A. Reaves (to 12 Oct); Lt. Col. William S. Fellers

1st Battalion: Lt. Col. William E. Maxwell (to 30 Aug) (Note: Relieved for perceived lack of aggressiveness.); Maj. Donald W. Fuller (to 13 Oct); Maj. William K. Enright

CMoH recipient: Cpl. Anthony Casamento

2nd Battalion: Lt. Col. Harold E. Rosecrans (to 11 Sep); Capt. Joseph J. Dudkowski (1-17, 25-30 Sep); Lt. Col. Walker A. Reaves (18-24 Sep); Maj. David S. McDougal (1-8 Oct); Maj. William J. Piper (8-11 Oct); Maj. Lewis W. Walt
3rd Battalion: Lt. Col. Frederick C. Biebush (to 22 Sep); Maj. Robert O. Bowen

7th Marine Regiment

Colonel James W. Webb (to 20 Sep) (Note: Relieved by Vandegrift for poor performance.); Colonel Amor L. Sims
Exec. ofc.: Col. Amor L. Sims (to 20 Sep); Lt. Col. Julian N. Frisbie

1st Battalion: Lt. Col. Lewis B. "Chesty" Puller (Note: Eventually became most-decorated man in history of Marine Corps.)

CMoH recipient: Sgt. John Basilone (Note: Later killed on Iwo Jima)

2nd Battalion: Lt. Col. Herman H. "Hard-Headed" Hanneken (Note: Commanded 7th Marines on Peleliu.)

CMoH recipient: Lt. Mitchell Paige

3rd Battalion: Lt. Col. Edwin J. Farrell (to 24 Sep); Lt. Col. William R. Williams

11th Marine Regiment (Artillery)

Colonel Pedro del Valle (Note: Promoted to Brigadier General 9 Oct; commanded 1st Marine Division during Okinawa Campaign.)
Exec. ofc.: Lt. Col. John A. Bemis (to 17 Oct); Lt. Col. Robert B. Luckey (to 28 Nov) (Note: Commanded 15th Marines during Okinawa Campaign.); Lt. Col. Thomas B. Hughes

1st Battalion: Lt. Col. Joseph R. Knowlan (to 19 Oct); Lt. Col. Manley L. Curry (to 28 Nov); Lt. Col. Donovan D. Sult (to 2 Dec)
2nd Battalion: Lt. Col. Edward G. Hagen (to 14 Sep); Maj. Forest C. Thompson
3rd Battalion: Lt. Col. James J. Keating
4th Battalion: Lt. Col. Melvin E. Fuller (to 28 Oct; from 7 Dec); Maj. Carl G.F. Korn (28-31 Oct); Capt. Albert H. Potter (to 6 Dec)
5th Battalion: Lt. Col. E. Hayden Price (to 18 Oct); Maj. Noah P. Wood, Jr.

Other Marine units

3rd Defense Battalion (landed 7 Aug): Col. Robert H. Pepper

Executive officer: Lt. Col. Harold C. Roberts
Operations officer: Maj. Samuel G. Taxis

1st Parachute Battalion: Maj. Charles A. Miller (to 18 Sep); Capt. Harry Torgerson (19-26 Sep); Maj. Robert H. Williams (from 27 Sep)
1st Raider Battalion: Col. Merritt A. Edson (CMoH recipient) (to 21 Sep); Lt. Col. Samuel B. Griffith (22-27 Sep)

CMoH recipient: Maj. Kenneth D. Bailey (KIA 26 Sep)

1st Amphibian Tractor Battalion: Lt. Col. Walter W. Barr
1st Aviation Engineer Battalion: Maj. Thomas F. Riley
1st Pioneer Battalion: Maj. James G. Frazer (to 25 Oct); Maj. Henry H. Crockett
1st Medical Battalion: Cmdr. Don S. Knowlton, USN
1st Special Weapons Battalion: Maj. Robert B. Luckey (to 6 Oct); Maj. Richard W. Wallace
1st Tank Battalion: Maj. Harvey S. Walseth

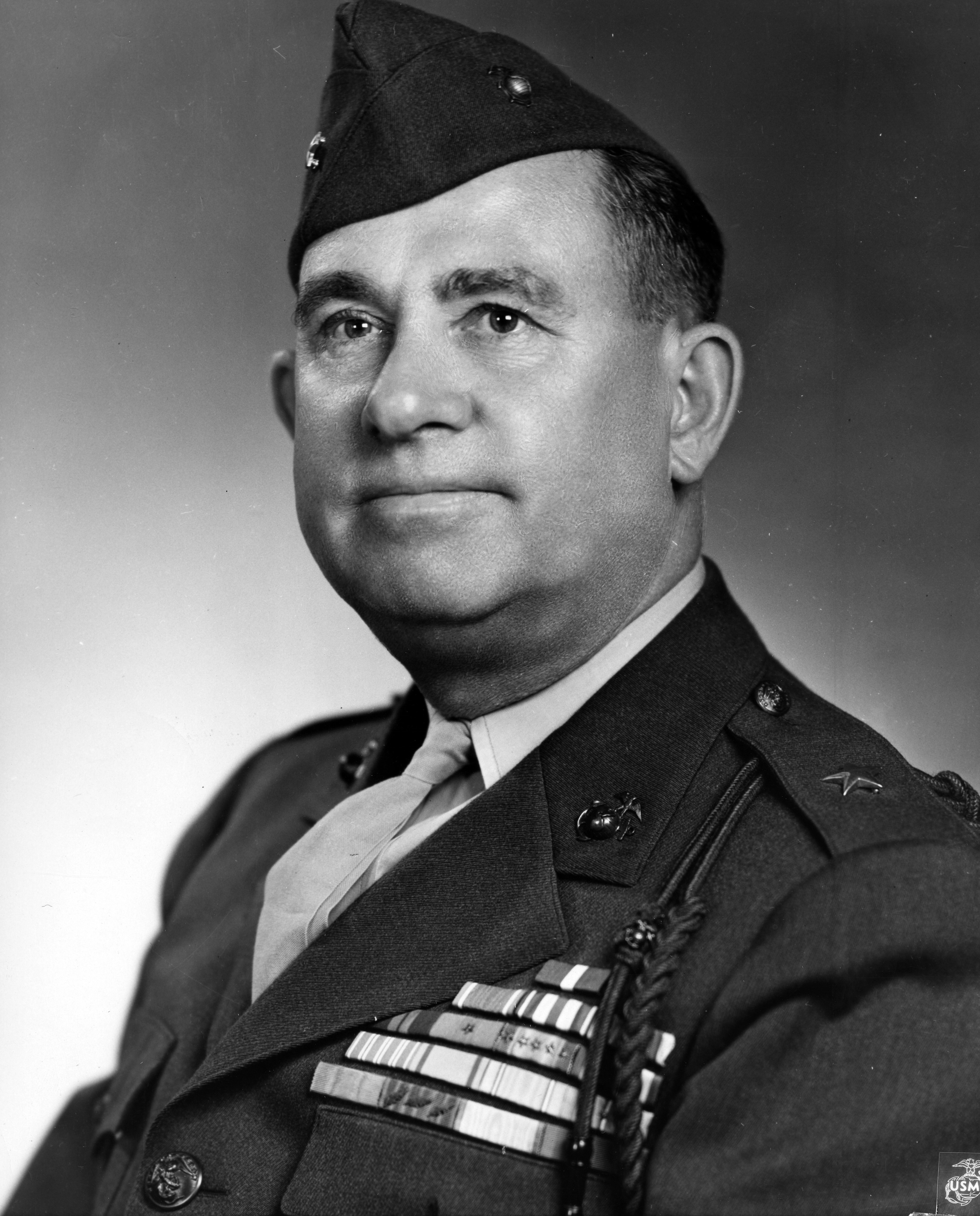
Brig. Gen. Alphonse DeCarre

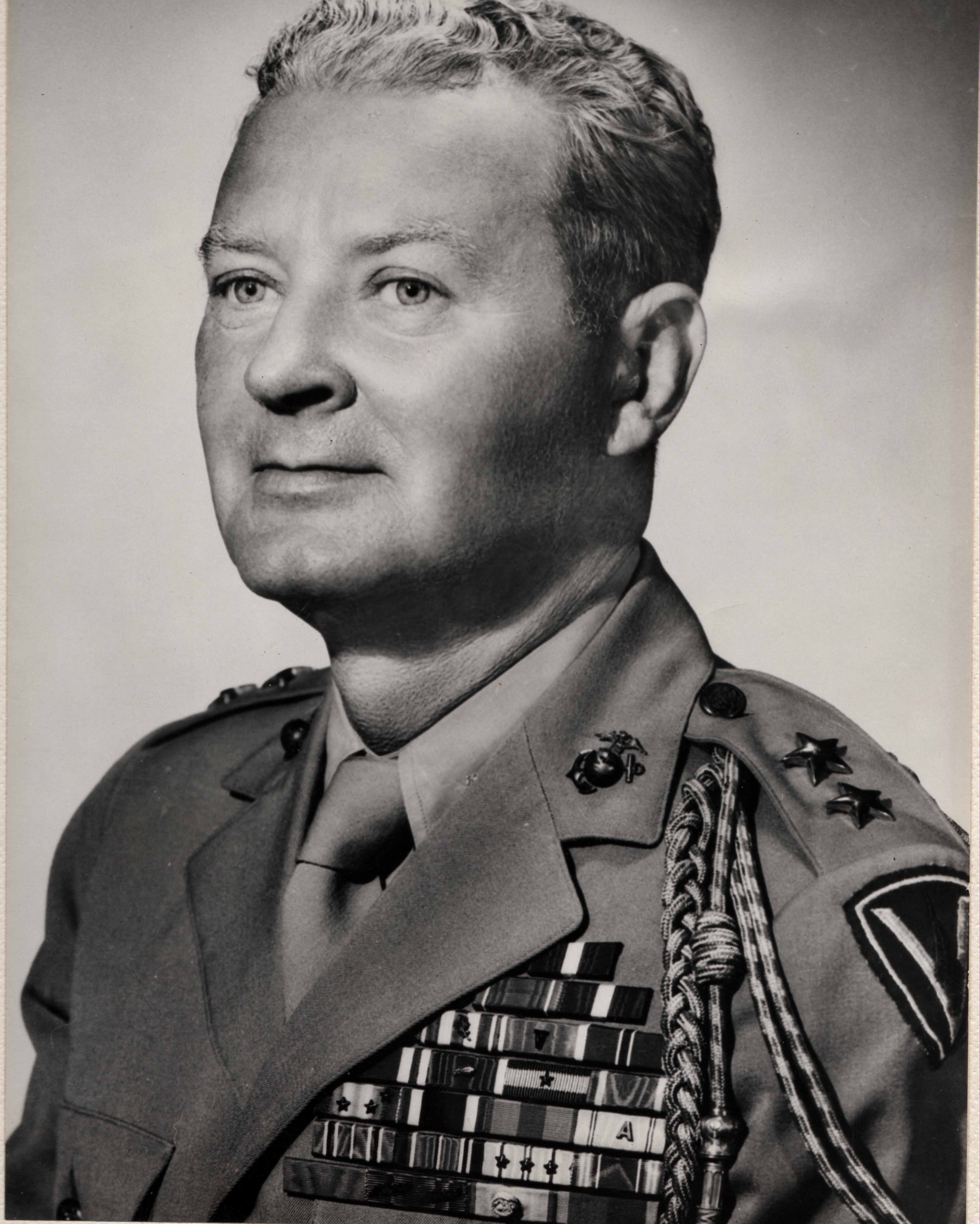
Leo D. Hermle as a major general

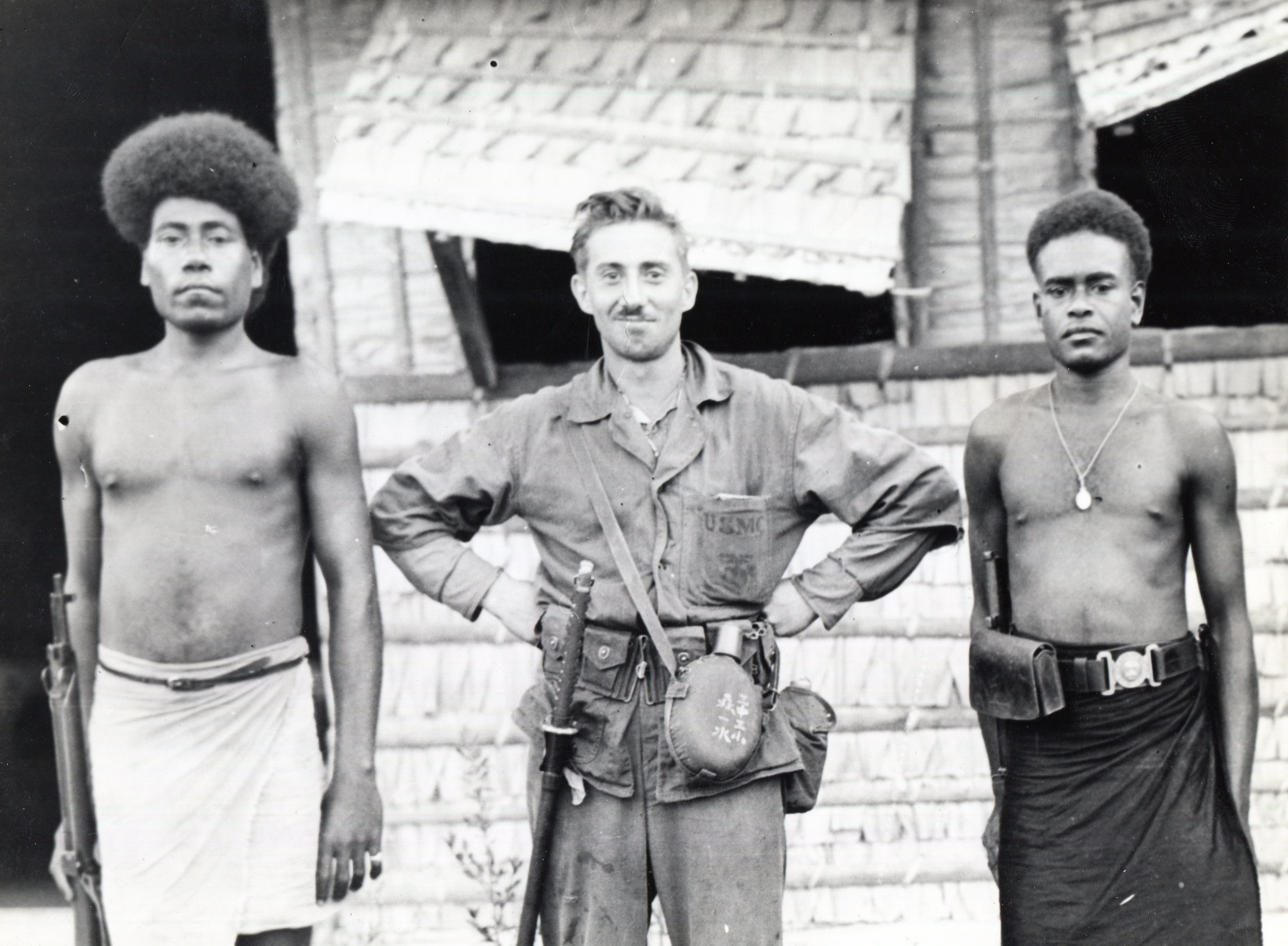
A Marine corporal with two Guadalcanal police officers

2nd Marine Division
Brigadier General Alphonse DeCarre

The 2nd Marines reinforced by the 3rd Battalion/10th Marines were part of the initial 7 August landings. The reinforced 8th Marines landed on 2 November and the reinforced 6th Marines on 4 January 1943.

Division staff

Asst. to commanding general: Col. Leo D. Hermle (Note: Later rose to regimental and assistant division command)
Chief of staff: Col. George F. Stockes
Asst. CoS for Personnel (D-1): Maj. Lawrence C. Hays Jr.
Asst. CoS for Intelligence (D-2): Maj. Thomas J. Colley
Asst. CoS for Operations (D-3): Lt. Col. John H. Coffman
Asst. CoS for Logistics (D-4): Maj. George N. Carroll
Division special troops: Col. Maurice G. Holmes

2nd Marine Regiment
Colonel John M. Arthur
Exec. ofc.: Lt. Col. William S. Fellers (to 9 Oct); Lt. Col. Cornelius P. Van Ness

1st Battalion: Lt. Col. Robert E. Hill (to 10 Nov); Maj. Wood B. Kyle (Note: Also commanded the battalion on Tarawa, Saipan and Tinian)
2nd Battalion: Maj. Orin K. Pressley
3rd Battalion: Maj. Robert G. Hunt

6th Marine Regiment
Colonel Gilder D. Jackson Jr. (Note: Malaria acquired on Guadalcanal having rendered him unfit for further frontline duty, he received only stateside assignments afterward.)
Exec. ofc.: Lt. Col. Alfred A. Watters (to 15 Dec); Lt. Col. Lyman G. Miller

1st Battalion: Lt. Col. Russell Lloyd
2nd Battalion: Maj. Raymond L. Murray
3rd Battalion: Maj. William A. Kengla

8th Marine Regiment
Colonel Richard H. Jeschke
Exec. ofc.: Lt. Col. James P. Riseley

1st Battalion: Lt. Col. Miles S. Newton (from 15 Jan. to 15 Nov, 1942); Maj. Joseph B. McCaffery
2nd Battalion: Lt. Col. John H. Cook Jr.
3rd Battalion: Lt. Col. Augustus H. Fricke

10th Marine Regiment (Artillery)
Colonel Thomas E. Bourke
Exec. ofc.: Lt. Col. Ralph E. Forsyth

1st Battalion: Lt. Col. Presley M. Rixey
2nd Battalion: Maj. George R. E. Shell
3rd Battalion: Lt. Col. Manly L. Curry (to 18 Oct; from 28 Nov); Lt. Col. Donovan D. Sult (18 Oct-28 Nov)
4th Battalion: Lt. Col. Kenneth A. Jorgensen

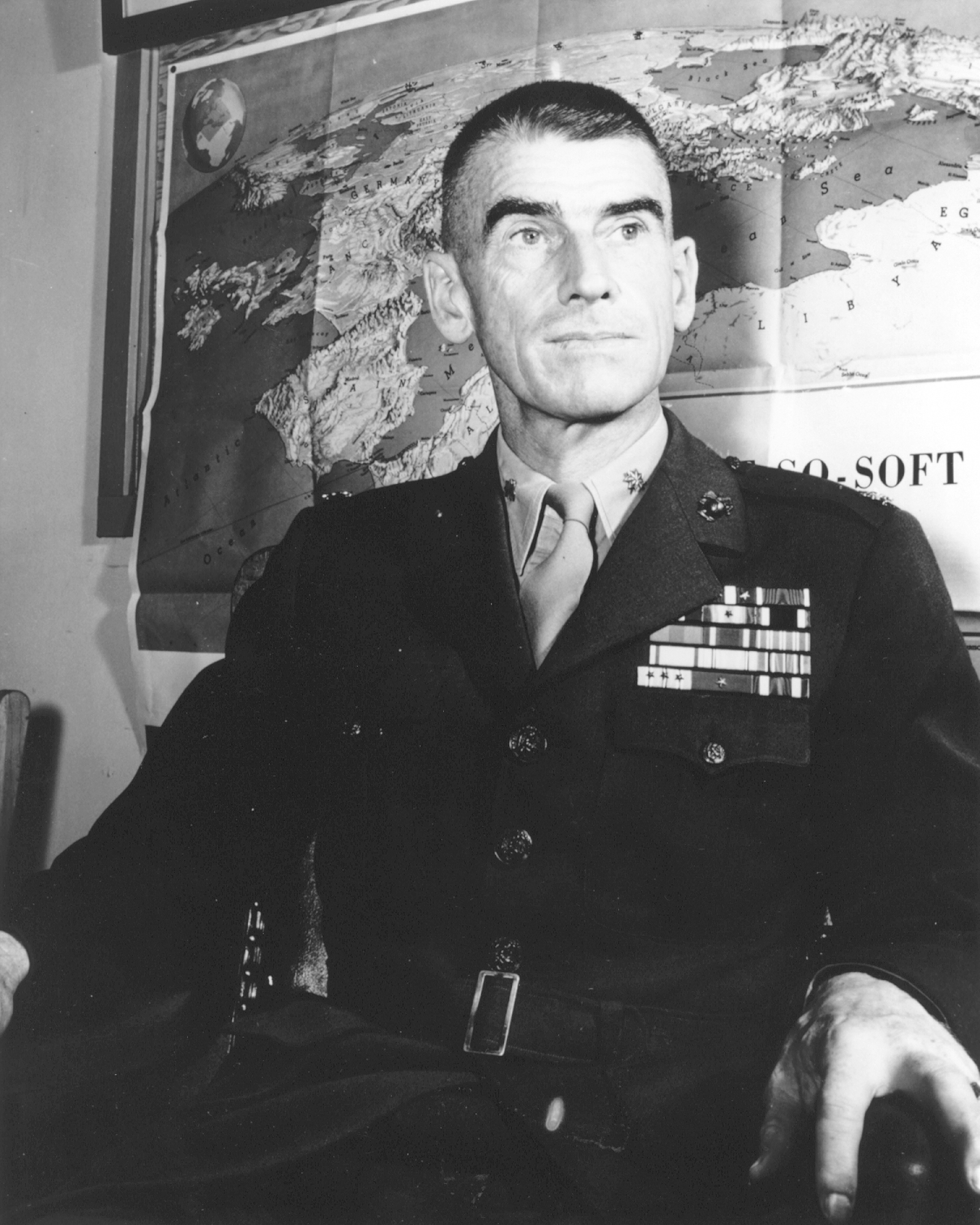
Lt. Col. Evans F. Carlson

Other Marine units

2nd Amphibian Tractor Battalion: Maj. Henry C. Drewes
9th Defense Battalion (landed December 1942)

Commanding officer: Col. David R. Nimmer
Executive officer: Lt. Col. William J. Scheyer
Operations officer: Capt. William C. Givens

2nd Raider Battalion ("Carlson's Raiders"): Lt. Col. Evans F. Carlson
2nd Special Weapons Battalion: Lt. Col. Paul D. Sherman
2nd Tank Battalion: Maj. Alexander B. Swenceski
6th Naval Construction Battalion: Lt. Cmdr. Joseph L. Blundon, CEC (Started landing on 27 August)
3rd Battalion 18th Marines (started landing on 12 December)

=== Army forces ===
Americal Division

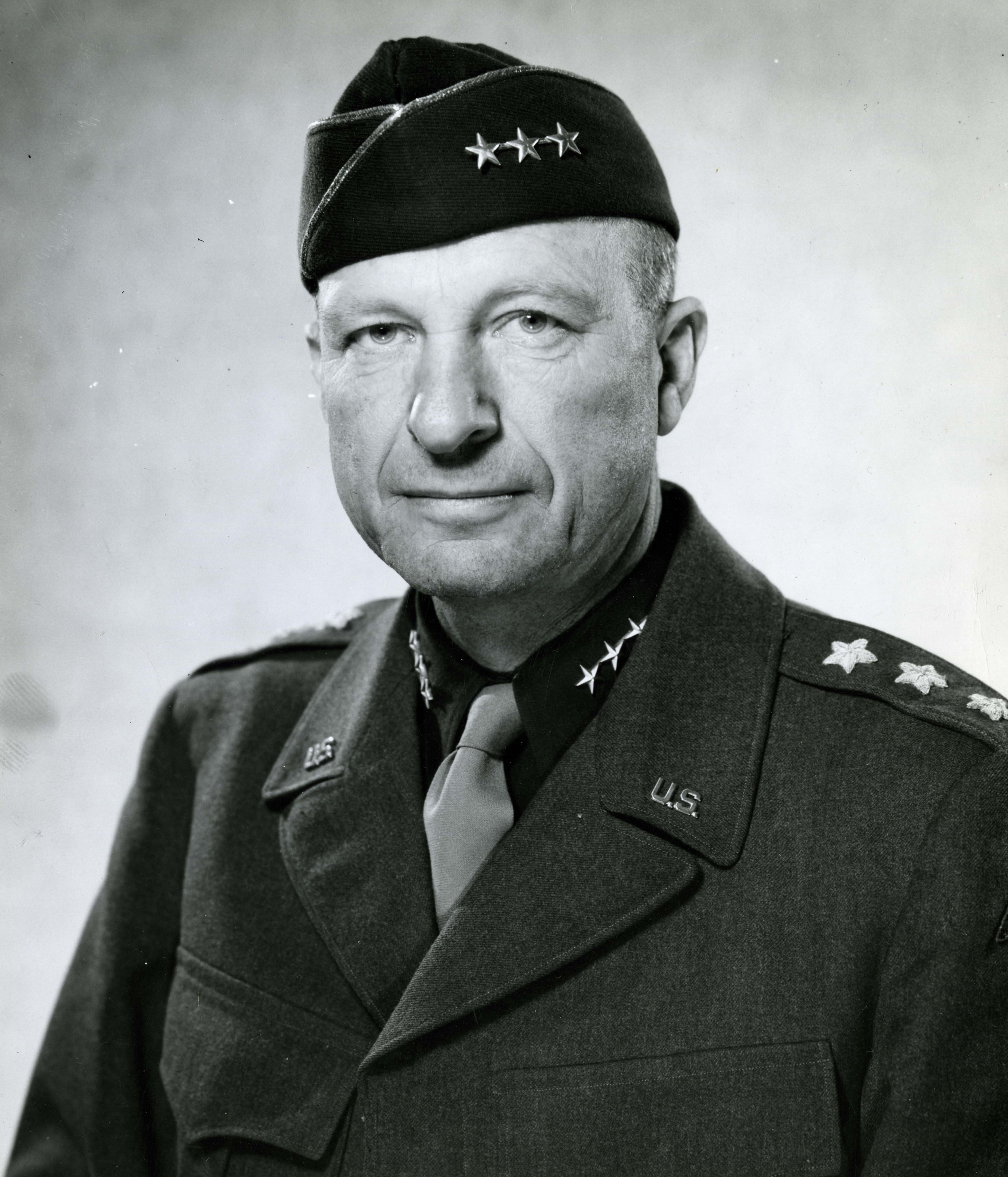
Alexander M. Patch as a lieutenant general

Major General Alexander M. Patch (Note: Later rose to army command during the liberation of Europe)

Arrived in echelons beginning 13 October:

132nd Infantry Regiment (Illinois National Guard)
164th Infantry Regiment (North Dakota National Guard)

Landed 13 October:

182nd Infantry Regiment (Massachusetts National Guard)

Landed 12 November:

147th Infantry Regiment (Separate) (Ohio National Guard)
97th Field Artillery Battalion
214th Coast Artillery (United States)
244th Coast Artillery Regiment

221st Field Artillery Battalion
245th Field Artillery Battalion
246th Field Artillery Battalion
247th Field Artillery Battalion
57th Engineer Combat Battalion

25th Infantry Division

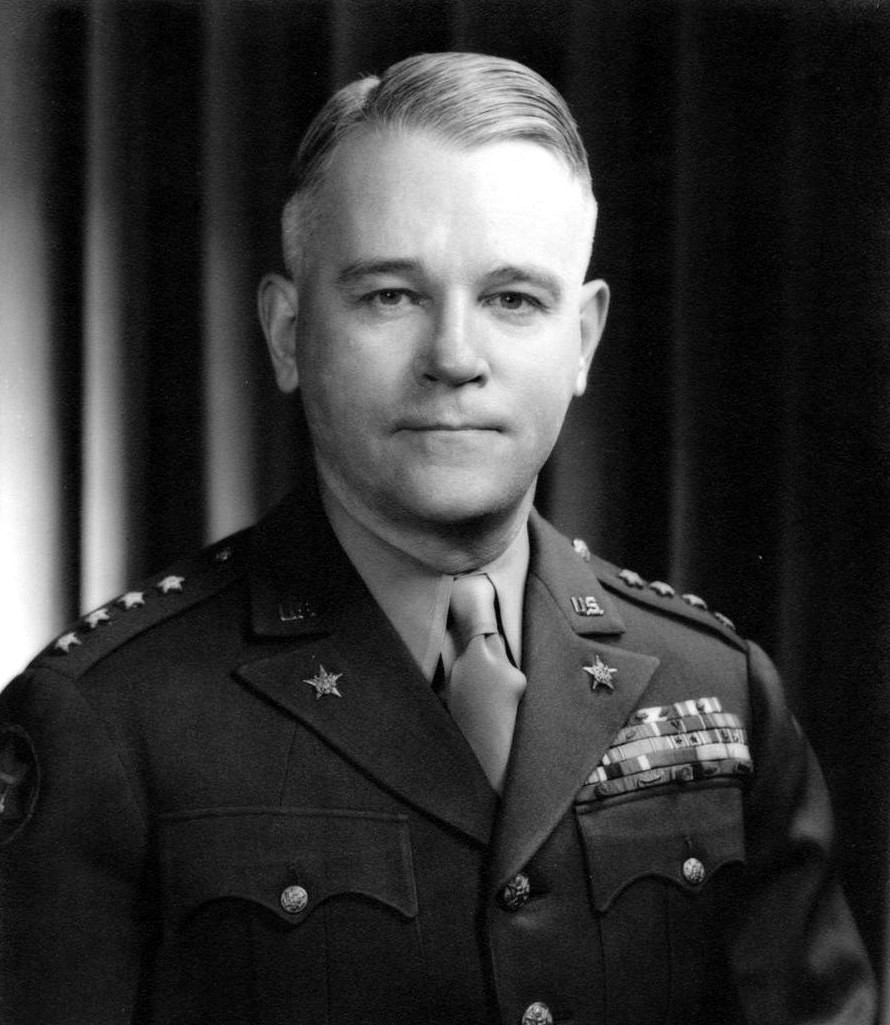
J. Lawton Collins as a full general

Major General J. Lawton Collins (Note: Later rose to Corps command during the liberation of Europe and Army Chief of Staff during Korean War)

Arrived in echelons beginning 17 December:

27th Infantry Regiment (Note: Cpl. James Jones, who later fictionalized his experience on Guadalcanal in the 1962 novel The Thin Red Line, served in this unit.)

MoH recipient: Capt. Charles W. Davis

35th Infantry Regiment

MoH recipients: Sgt. William G. Fournier (MW 10 Jan 1943), Tech. Lewis Hall (KIA 10 Jan 1943)

161st Infantry Regiment (Washington National Guard)

Battalion-level units:

8th Field Artillery Battalion
64th Field Artillery Battalion
89th Field Artillery Battalion
90th Field Artillery Battalion
65th Engineer Combat Battalion

Service Command, South Pacific Theater of Operations
Brigadier General Raymond E. S. Williamson

70th Coast Artillery
Engineer units
Supply units
Military Police units

== Japanese ==
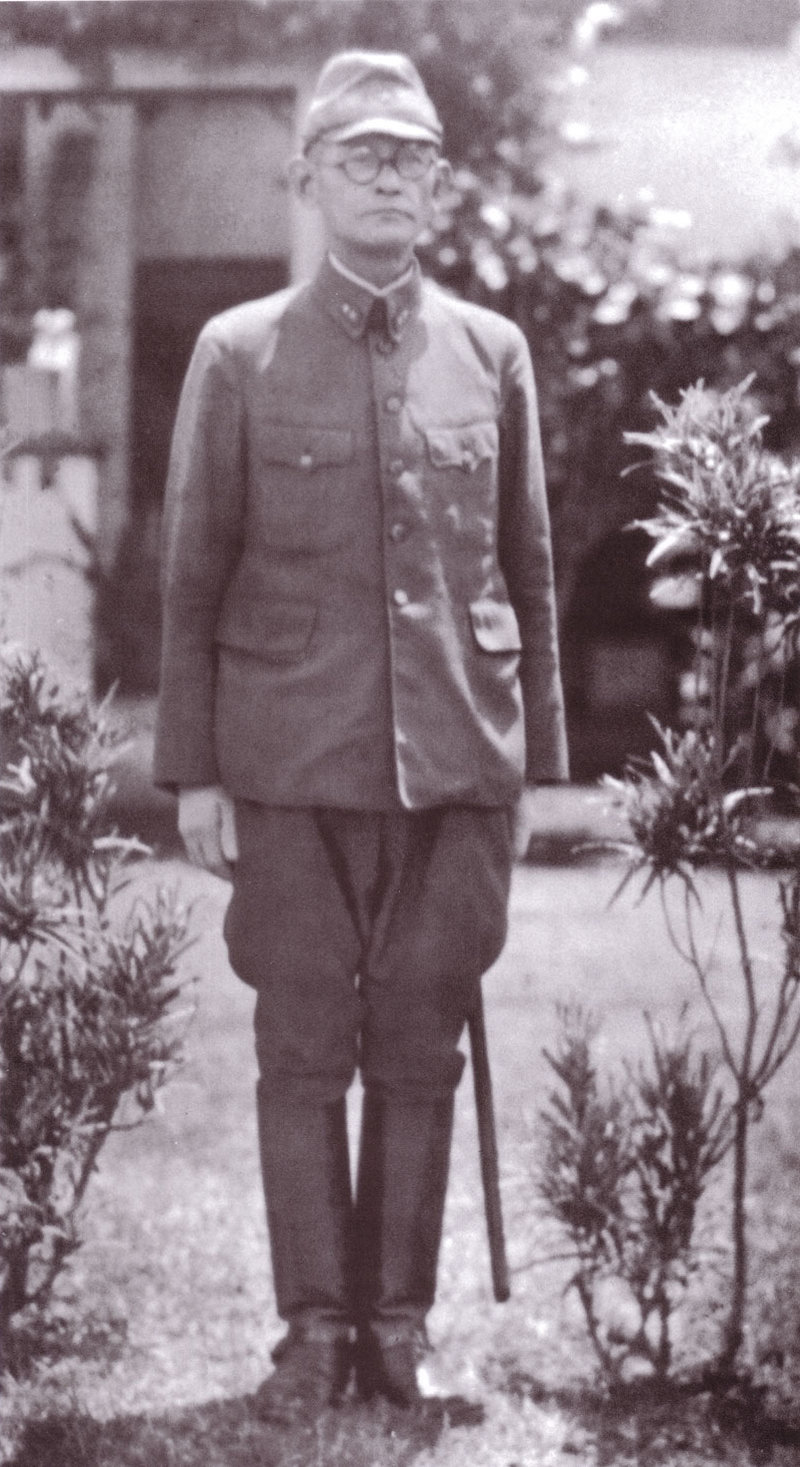
Lt. Gen. Harukichi Hyakutake

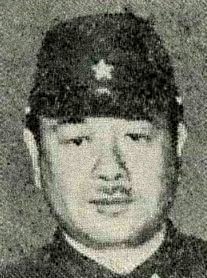
Maj. Gen. Kiyotake Kawaguchi was relieved of command and expelled from the island 23 October just as the Battle of Henderson Field was beginning

=== Seventeenth Army (Note: A Japanese army was equivalent to a Euro-American corps.) ===
Lieutenant General Harukichi Hyakutake (Note: Arrived on the island to take direct command 10 October.)

2nd Infantry (Sendai) Division
Lieutenant General Masao Maruyama

Landed between 5 September and 4 October:

4th Infantry Regiment
16th Infantry Regiment
29th Infantry Regiment
2nd Artillery Regiment
2nd Engineer Battalion

38th Infantry Division
Lieutenant General Tadayoshi Sano

The depleted 38th Division landed 5–15 November

228th Infantry Regiment
229th Infantry Regiment
230th Infantry Regiment
38th Mountain Gun Regiment
38th Engineer Battalion

35th Brigade
Major General Kiyotaki Kawaguchi (Note: Relieved 23 October and given rear-area command after repeated refusal to obey orders)

Landed 29 August–5 September; included a late-arriving battalion of the 28th Infantry Regiment.

124th Infantry Regiment
Kitao Battalion / Ichiki Detachment (Note: Arrived 18–24 August.)

4th Artillery Regiment

10th Mountain Gun Battalion
20th Mountain Gun Battalion

=== Other units ===
28th Infantry Regiment
Arrived 6 July to begin construction of an airstrip:

11th Construction Unit
13th Construction Unit

== Bibliography ==
- Morison, Samuel Eliot (1949). Coral Sea, Midway and Submarine Actions, May 1942 – August 1942. History of United States Naval Operations in World War II. Vol. IV. Boston: Little, Brown and Co.
- Morison, Samuel Eliot (1948). The Struggle for Guadalcanal, August 1942 – February 1943. History of United States Naval Operations in World War II. Vol. V. Boston: Little, Brown and Co.
- Stille, Mark (2015). Guadalcanal, 1942–43: America's first victory on the road to Tokyo. Oxford: Osprey.
