= Frank Goettge =

United States Marine Corps officer

Frank Bryan Goettge
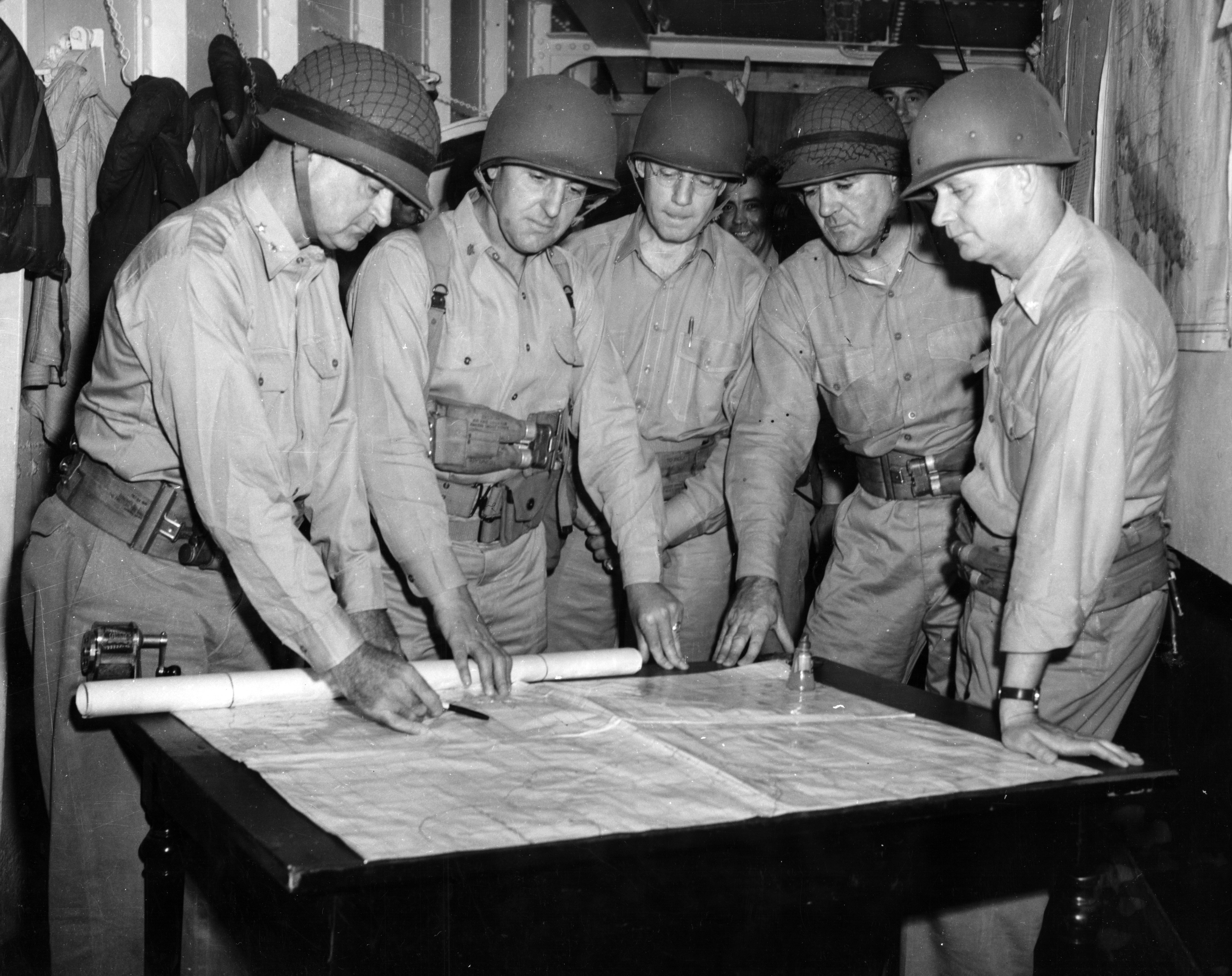
- MajGen Alexander A. Vandegrift, with his staff on board the transport USS McCawley (APA-4) en route to Guadalcanal. Left to right: MajGen Alexander Vandegrift, command officer; LtCol Gerald C. Thomas, operations officer, LtCol Randolph McC. Pate, logistics officer; LtCol Frank B. Goettge, intelligence officer; and Col William C. James, chief of staff.
- Born: December 30, 1895; Canton, Ohio, U.S.
- Died: August 12, 1942 (aged 46); Guadalcanal, Solomon Islands
- Military career
- Allegiance: United States of America
- Branch: United States Marine Corps
- Service years: 1917–1942
- Rank: Colonel
- Unit: 1st Marine Division
- Conflicts: World War I: Meuse-Argonne Offensive; World War II: Pacific War; Guadalcanal Campaign; Goettge Patrol †
- Awards: Legion of Merit with Combat V

Frank Bryan Goettge (Note: Pronounced "Getchey", per a 1942 newspaper column.) (30 December 1895 – 12 August 1942) was a United States Marine Corps intelligence officer in World War II. He led the ill-fated Goettge Patrol in the early days of the Guadalcanal campaign and was killed during that operation.

== Biography ==
Goettge was born in Canton, Ohio, on 30 December 1895. He enlisted in the Marine Corps during World War I in May 1917, after spending one year at Ohio University. Goettge was commissioned as a first lieutenant in 1918. During World War I, Goettge served with the 5th Marines in the Meuse–Argonne offensive and later served in occupation duty at Segendorf, Germany.

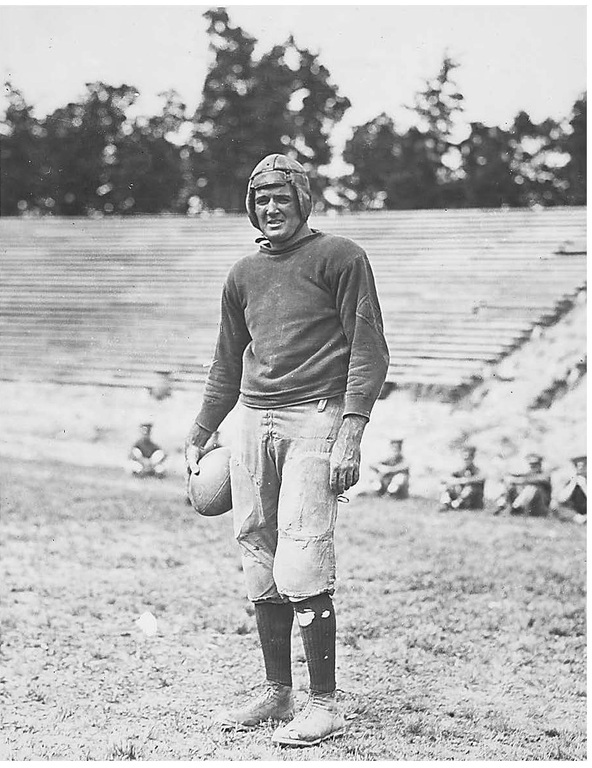
Goettge c. 1921

After the war, Goettge served in a number of billets, including the 1st Provisional Brigade in Haiti, and at Headquarters of the Department of the Pacific, in San Francisco and Hawaii. In 1924, Goettge went to Quantico and was later sent to the Marine Detachment in Peking, China. In June 1933, Goettge served aboard the battleship USS Pennsylvania and then was commanding officer of the Marine detachment at Annapolis, Maryland. In June 1941, Goettge was assigned to the 1st Marine Division and remained in that unit as division intelligence officer until his death the following year.

Goettge was known for his prowess on the football field; first at Barberton High School in Ohio, then for several semi-pro football teams and on the Ohio Bobcats freshman football team. Goettge gained national fame playing football for the Quantico Marines. Drawing attention from the NFL, Goettge turned down a contract with the New York Giants.

== Goettge Patrol ==
Prior to the Marine invasion of the Solomon Islands in Operation Watchtower, Goettge, Division G-2 augmented Marine Intelligence when he traveled to Australia spending a week in Melbourne and a few days in Sydney gathering information on the islands from people who lived and worked there. In addition to information gleaned from interviews, Goettge brought eight Australians to where the First Marine Division was forming in Wellington, New Zealand.

The Marines landed on Guadalcanal on 7 August 1942 and within several days rounded up a number of Japanese Navy laborers who had been assigned to construct the airfield at Lunga Point. Most were malnourished and sick from tropical illnesses. A Japanese warrant officer was among the prisoners and, after being plied with alcohol, told the Marines that there were a number of Japanese west of the Matanikau River. These soldiers were reportedly sick, demoralized, and willing to surrender. At about the same time, Marines near the Matanikau perimeter reported seeing a white flag flying from a tree. It is possible that this was actually a normal Japanese flag with the Hinomaru disc insignia obscured.

These reports, as well as several other similar accounts were given to Goettge. He thought that this might be an opportunity to secure much of the island without significant fighting, and he decided to act quickly. He organized a 25-man patrol to land just west of the Matanikau estuary. The plan was to follow the Matanikau upstream, bivouac for a night, then head east back to the Lunga perimeter.

The patrol consisted of Goettge; Japanese translator Lieutenant Ralph Cory; regimental surgeon Lieutenant Commander Malcom Pratt; and a handful of scouts and infantry. Just before the patrol departed on the evening of 12 August, Goettge was informed by Colonel William J. Whaling, the 5th Marine's executive officer, that the Japanese were strongly defending the area between Point Cruz and the mouth of the Matanikau. Whaling suggested a landing west of Point Cruz.

The Goettge Patrol left at dusk on a tank lighter. However, a flare was seen to the east, and the lighter returned to the perimeter, thinking it was a signal to return. The patrol then left for a second time around 21:00. Despite Whaling's warning, the boat headed for an area just to the west of the Matanikau River mouth. Before the patrol reached the beach, the lighter ran aground on a sandbar. The coxswain gunned the motor to free the vessel, and the Marines disembarked on the beach around 22:00.

Unbeknownst to Goettge, the Japanese had heard the sound of the stuck landing craft and began organizing troops on a coral plateau about 200 yards (180 m) inland from the Marines. Goettge ordered a defensive perimeter established, then took two men, Captain Ringer and First Sergeant Custer, with him to scout the jungle. Not long after they left the beach, the Japanese opened fire, and Goettge was killed with a shot to the head. Ringer and Custer managed to make it back to the perimeter.

Platoon Sergeant Frank Lowell Few and two Marines went back into the jungle to confirm that Goettge was indeed dead. They found his body and took his watch and insignia, so the Japanese would not be able to identify him as an officer. Over the next nine hours, the patrol lay pinned on the beach. The Japanese maintained fire on the American perimeter, but the Marines were unable to locate the Japanese in the dark jungle. About 30 minutes after landing, Sergeant Arndt was tasked to head out into the ocean and try to swim back to the Lunga perimeter, over 5 miles (8 km) to the east. Arndt reached American lines around 05:00, but it was too late to affect the fate of the Goettge Patrol.

During the course of the night, the Japanese picked the Marines off, one by one. The Japanese would occasionally launch a flare to illuminate the beachhead perimeter. However, the Marines were unable to discern the Japanese positions in the moonless night. After some time, Captain Ringer ordered another Marine, Corporal Spaulding, to make a second attempt to get back to American lines. He reached American lines around 07:30.

By dawn, only four members of the patrol were still alive. Captain Ringer decided they stood a better chance in the jungle. As the Marines made their dash off the beach, the Japanese opened fire, cutting down the remaining survivors except for Platoon Sergeant Frank Few. Few managed to reach the trees. He saw a Japanese soldier firing into the corpses of the Marines and decided it would be certain death to remain. Few drew his pistol, killed the soldier, then made a dash into the sea. Few looked back and saw Japanese troops swarming the beach, mutilating the bodies of the dead or wounded but still alive Marines. Few also managed to make it back to friendly lines by swimming approximately four miles (6 km) through shark-infested waters. Few was the last survivor of the Goettge Patrol. A slightly fictionalized version of the incident is in the movie Guadalcanal Diary. In the film, the patrol is led by a "Captain Cross" and there is only one survivor, though one Marine is shown running along the beach for help.

According to a Marine Corps monograph previous to 21 August, a patrol found Pratt's dispatch case and a cloth with Goettge's name on it; the monograph also claimed no identifiable remains were found. (See Note # 16) However on 18 August a Marine patrol from 3rd Battalion, 5th Marines, made a combat patrol in the same area that the Goettge Patrol was annihilated. They reported seeing remains, but Goettge's body was never found. There are at least five eyewitness reports of finding the remains of the patrol – one from Company "I"/3/5; one from Company "K"/3/5; and three from Company "L"/3/5.

== Legacy ==
The Goettge Fieldhouse aboard Marine Corps Base Camp Lejeune is named in his memory.

Richard Tregaskis included the events of the Goettge patrol in his book, Guadalcanal Diary. The events of the patrol were also included in the 1943 movie of the same name.

== Sources ==
- Richter, Don. "The Sun Stood Still - The Goettge Patrol". Archived from the original on September 28, 2007.
- Camp, Dick. "Leatherneck Translator". Archived from the original on September 18, 2004.
