= Guadalcanal Diary =

Guadalcanal Diary may refer to:

- Guadalcanal Diary (book), a memoir of war correspondent Richard Tregaskis, published 1 January 1943
- Guadalcanal Diary (film), a 1943 20th Century Fox film adaptation of the book
- Guadalcanal Diary (band), an alternative jangle pop group from Marietta, Georgia
