= Battle of Port-au-Prince =

Battle of Port-au-Prince may refer to:

- Battle of Port-au-Prince (1919)
- Battle of Port-au-Prince (1920)
