= Fleet Marine Force, Western Pacific =

- Active: 1947–1949
- Country: United States
- Type: Fleet Marine Force
- Role: Amphibious warfare, expeditionary warfare
- Part of: United States Marine Corps
- Garrison/HQ: Qingdao, Republic of China

Commanders
- Notable commanders: Gerald C. Thomas

Fleet Marine Force, Western Pacific (abbreviated FMFWesPac) was the command of the United States Marine Corps forces in China from 1947 to 1949, during the second half of Operation Beleaguer. The force provided security for the United States Navy training mission in Qingdao, China, for the navy of the Chinese Nationalists, and for the evacuation of American citizens from China towards the end of the Chinese Civil War. It was commanded by General Gerald C. Thomas for most of its existence.

== History ==
By the middle of 1946 the original mission of Operation Beleaguer, securing the withdrawal of Japanese troops from China after World War II, had been largely completed. Their instructions in China were to maintain neutrality in the Chinese Civil War while cooperating with the Nationalists. The 1st Marine Division remained in the province of Hebei to secure key supply lines for the Chinese Nationalists in north China, but by September 1946 the Chinese National Revolutionary Army replaced the Marines in this task, and from this point the Marines were only there to protect trains that were moving American citizens and property. General Keller E. Rockey, who was commander of both the division and Marine Forces, China, moved his troops into major cities, mostly near the coast, including Qinhuangdao and Tianjin. An element of the 1st Marine Division was also in Qingdao, in the province of Shandong, to protect U.S. Navy personnel providing training to Chinese sailors on the operation of ships that were transferred to the Republic of China Navy.

By early 1947 the war was not going well for the Nationalists and they refused to seriously negotiate for a truce with the Communists. On the recommendation of General George C. Marshall, who had advised Chiang Kai-shek, in January 1947 President Harry Truman ordered the end of his mission to China. The gradual withdrawal of the 1st Marine Division and the 1st Marine Aircraft Wing began around this time. Under a plan adopted in April 1947, the division would withdraw except for a rear echelon in Tianjin that would dispose of remaining U.S. property, and on 1 May 1947 a new command was established in Qingdao – the Fleet Marine Force, Western Pacific (FMFWesPac). Commanded by Brigadier General Omar T. Pfeiffer, the formation was responsible for protecting the U.S. Navy training mission to the Chinese Nationalist navy in Qingdao. FMFWesPac eventually consisted of the Headquarters and Service Battalion; the 3rd Battalion, 4th Marines; the 2nd Battalion, 1st Marines; the 12th Service Battalion; and Air FMFWesPac, which included three air squadrons.

As of May 1947 most of the 1st Marine Division had been withdrawn from China, except for the rear echelon in Tianjin, leaving FMFWesPac in Qingdao as being responsible for the protection of American citizens in China. It was ordered to have an infantry battalion ready at all times to be air-lifted to Shanghai, Nanjing, or Tianjin, where most of the remaining Americans were located. FMFWesPac served as both a naval base guard detachment and as a Fleet Marine Force air-ground team. Its units participated in training for both guard duties to protect the base from raids, and also for amphibious operations, which was done with the ships of the Navy. Around October 1947 the Marine Corps underwent a reorganization in accordance with new personnel and budgetary limitations. The two infantry battalions of FMFWesPac assumed the names and lineage of their regiments, with 3rd Battalion becoming 4th Marines and the 2nd Battalion becoming the 1st Marines. In July, General Gerald C. Thomas had assumed command from Pfeiffer.

As the inevitability of the Nationalist collapse became apparent in the fall of 1948, the U.S. ordered the evacuation of all American citizens from China, followed by the withdrawal of FMFWesPac. In February 1949 the 3rd Marines and the recently deployed 9th Marines were the only FMFWesPac elements still in China, providing security for the civilian evacuation effort. On 17 March the 3rd Marines was sent from Qingdao to Shanghai to take over the mission of the 9th Marines, preparing to withdraw, with the exception of Company C, which stayed behind in Qingdao. The 3rd Marines left Shanghai at the end of April and set off for the United States on 6 May, while Company C of the regiment stayed until 14 May. It was relieved by Company C of the 7th Marines. That company also departed for the U.S. not long after. The last element of Fleet Marine Force, Western Pacific, arrived in San Diego on 16 May 1949, ending Operation Beleaguer, and the formation had been formally dissolved earlier in March.

== Structure ==
When it was founded on 1 May 1947 the command was initially planned to consist of the following:

- Headquarters and Service Battalion
- 3rd Battalion, 4th Marines
- 2nd Battalion, 1st Marines
- 12th Service Battalion
- Air FMFWesPac
  - Service squadron of the 1st Marine Air Wing
  - Marine Fighting Squadron 211 (VMF-211)
  - Marine Transport Squadron 153 (VMR-153)

The rear echelon of the withdrawing 1st Marine Division, from the 7th Service Regiment, located in Tianjin, was also subordinated to FMFWesPac until it was withdrawn on 1 September 1947. This left FMFWesPac in Qingdao as the only Marine command in China.

=== Commanders ===
- Brigadier General Omar T. Pfeiffer (May–July 1947)
- General Gerald C. Thomas (July 1947–March 1949)

== Sources ==
- Shao, Wenguang (2022). China's Foreign Policy and Practice: A Survey. London: Routledge. ISBN 978-1-000-78747-4.
- Shaw, Henry I. Jr. (1960). The United States Marines in North China (PDF). Washington, DC: Marine Corps History Division, Headquarters Marine Corps.
