= William C. James =

U.S. Marine Corps Brigadier General (1896–1974)

William Capers James
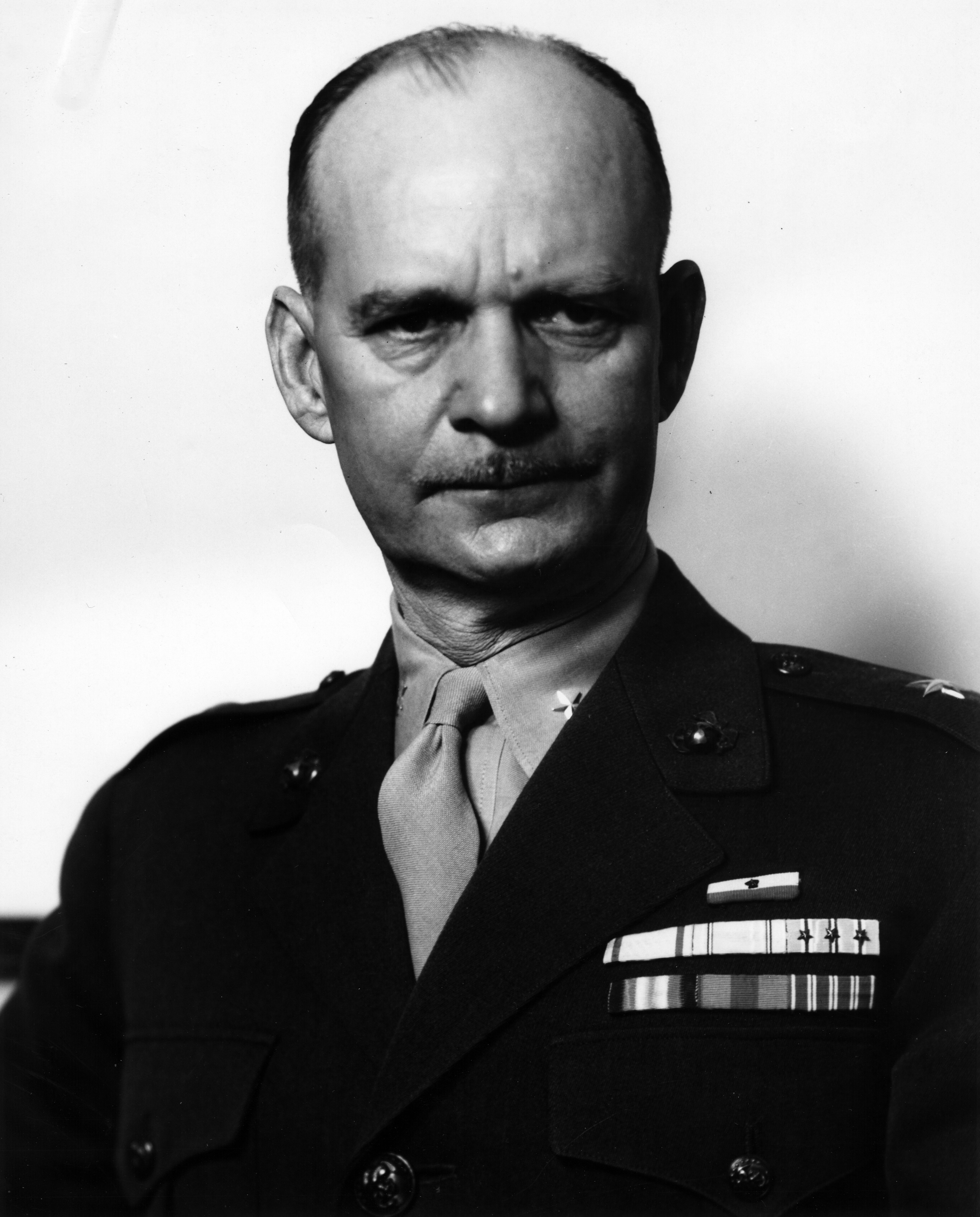
- James as Brigadier general, USMC
- Born: June 22, 1896; Florence, South Carolina, U.S.
- Died: September 30, 1974 (aged 78); Daytona Beach, Florida, U.S.
- Military career
- Allegiance: United States of America
- Branch: United States Marine Corps
- Service years: 1916–1946
- Rank: Brigadier general
- Commands: Marine Corps Base San Diego; Chief of Staff, 1st Marine Division
- Conflicts: Dominican Campaign; Nicaraguan Campaign; Yangtze Patrol; World War II: Battle of Guadalcanal; Battle of Saipan; Battle of Tinian

William Capers James (June 22, 1896 – September 30, 1974) was an officer of the United States Marine Corps with the rank of brigadier general, who served as chief of staff, 1st Marine Division during the Guadalcanal Campaign and later as commanding officer, Marine Corps Base San Diego.

James spent most of his career in administrative positions and never held field command until he was appointed chief of staff, 1st Marine Division. He sailed with that division to Guadalcanal in August 1942, but was relieved the next month due to poor performance and ordered back to the United States. James never held combat command again and spent the remainder of his career in administrative positions.

== Early career ==
William C. James was born on June 22, 1896, in Florence, South Carolina, and following high school, he attended the Citadel in Charleston, South Carolina. He graduated in June 1916 and entered the Marine Corps service as second lieutenant and was ordered to the Marine Officer's School at Norfolk Navy Yard, Virginia, for further officer training. Following the completion of the school, James was ordered to Santo Domingo in April 1917 for his first tour of expeditionary duty which lasted until February 1919. He then returned stateside as first lieutenant for duty at Marine Barracks Quantico.

James was ordered to Guantanamo Bay, Cuba, in February 1922 and served with local Marine Barracks at Naval Base Guanatanamo until June 1924. He then served at Marine Barracks, Philadelphia Navy Yard until he was ordered to the Marine Barracks, Charleston Navy Yard in September 1926.

He was ordered for his second tour of expeditionary duty to Nicaragua in October 1927, but returned one month later to the United States after commanding detachment of Guardia Nacional in Chinandega. James was subsequently promoted to the rank of captain and transferred to the Marine Barracks, Parris Island, South Carolina where he remained until summer 1929.

In July 1929, James was appointed commanding officer of Marine detachment aboard the battleship USS Tennessee and participated in the patrol cruises in the Pacific Ocean. A Marine detachment under his command won the Fleet Trophy for excellent gunnery.

He left Tennessee in August 1931 and returned to Marine Corps Base Quantico, where he completed Field Officers' course at the Marine Corps Schools. Upon his graduation, James was promoted to the rank of major in June 1932 and ordered back to Parris Island. He was promoted to the rank of lieutenant colonel in June 1936 and ordered to the Naval War College in Newport, Rhode Island, for senior course, which he completed in May 1937.

James was ordered to China upon the completion of the course at Naval War College and assumed command of the Marine detachment in Peking. He commanded "China Marines" during the next two years and faced the permanent provocations of Japanese garrison. James was succeeded by Colonel William W. Ashurst in August 1939 and returned to the United States for duty with Division of Reserve, Headquarters Marine Corps. He was promoted to the rank of colonel on August 21, 1939, and served as the acting Director of the Marine Corps Reserve from then until May 1940.

== World War II ==
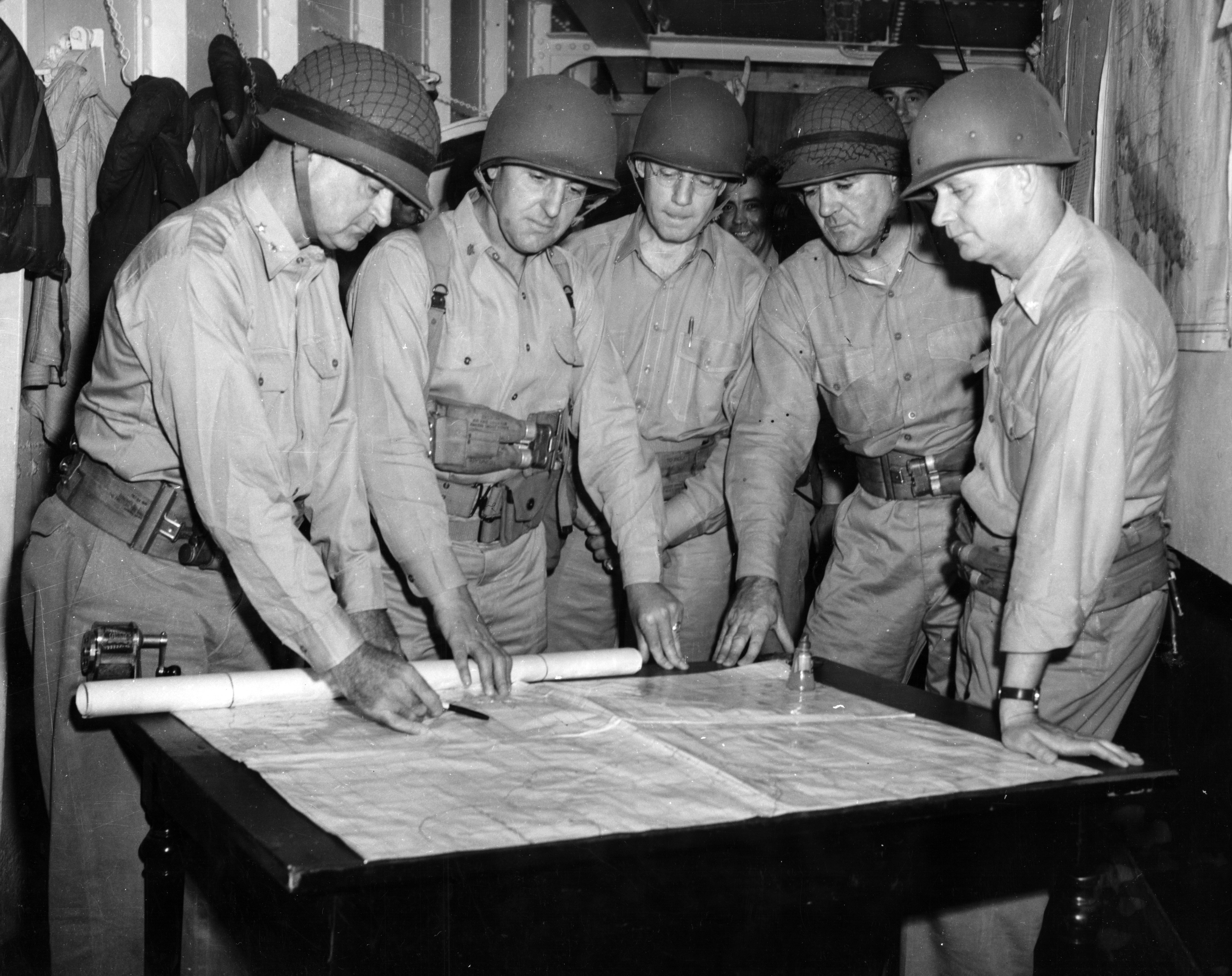
James (extreme right) during the staff meeting with Major General Vandegrift (extreme left) during the Guadalcanal Campaign. The others are: Gerald C. Thomas (Operations officer), Randolph M. Pate (Logistics officer) and Frank B. Goettge (Intelligence officers).

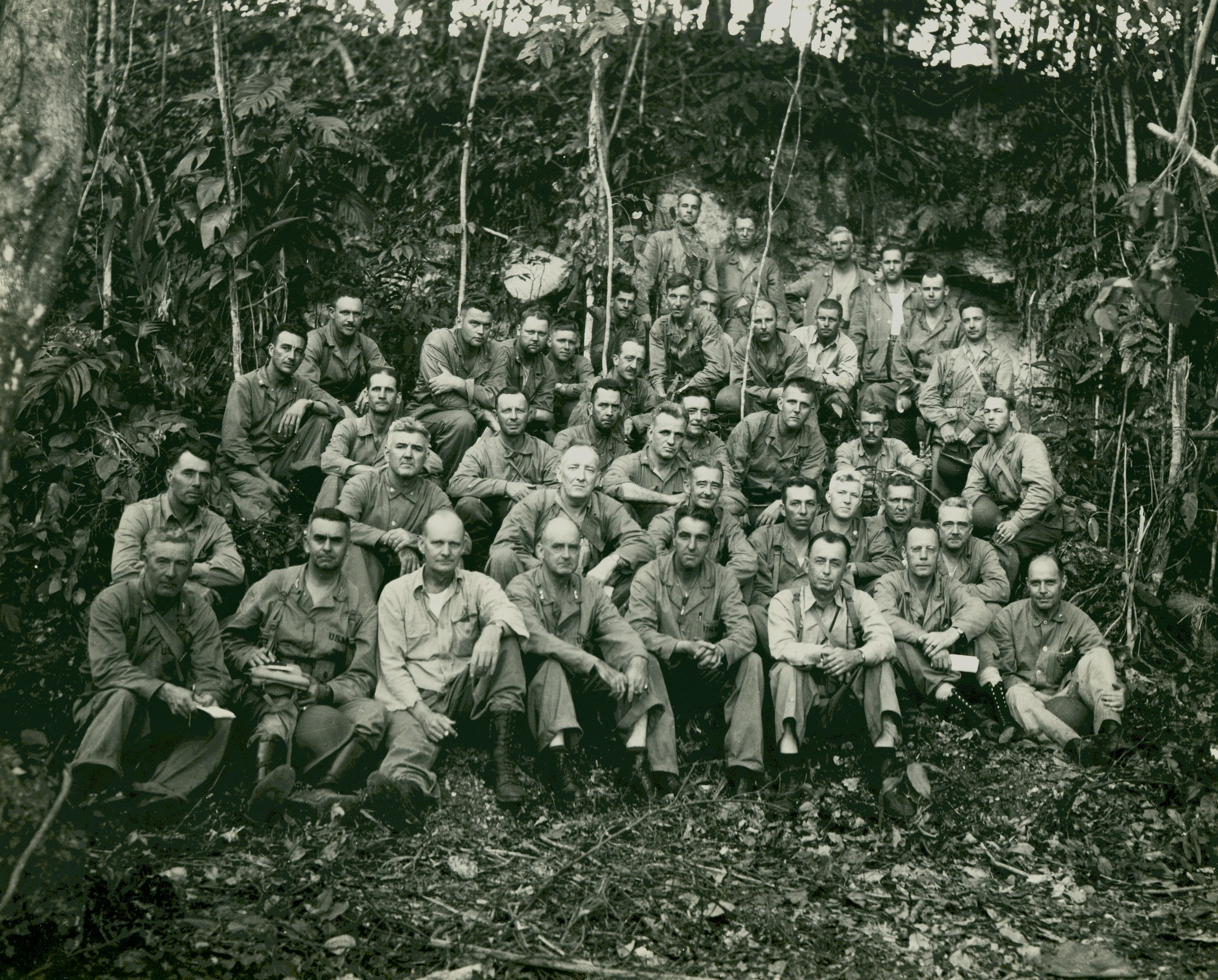
James (sitting in the front row, third from left) with the staff of 1st Marine Division on Guadalcanal in late 1942.

Following the Japanese attack on Pearl Harbor in December 1941, James was still stationed at Headquarters Marine Corps in Washington, D.C., and appointed as Military Secretary to the Commandant, Thomas Holcomb in March 1940. In this capacity, he was responsible for the day-to-day operations of the Office of the Commandant, supervision of the schedule of the commandant and other duties connected with administration of Commandants officer. He also simultaneously served as officer in charge, Marine Corps Public Information.

During the April 1942, commanding general of 1st Marine Division, Alexander A. Vandegrift, was looking for a new Divisional Chief of Staff as substitute for Colonel LeRoy P. Hunt. He requested colonel James, whom he knew from his service at Headquarters Marine Corps. Commandant Holcomb and his deputy Ralph S. Keyser agreed. The wives of Keyser and James were cousins and also cousins of Lottie Thomas, wife of 1st Marine Division operations officer, Gerald C. Thomas.

James, who had no previous experience of field command, became the chief of staff of combat division. He joined the 1st Marine division at New Zealand in July of that year and participated in the planning for upcoming Guadalcanal Campaign. Due to lack of combat experiences, James had not taken hold as division chief of staff and rest of the core divisional staff cooperated rather with divisional operations officer Gerald C. Thomas. Although they were distant relatives, relationship between James and Thomas started to get worse.

Colonel James participated in the landing on Guadalcanal in August 1942 and following the establishment of forward command post, he tried to coordinate divisional staff. His cautious approach quickly caused the loss of confidence of Vandegrift. General Vandegrift, who saw, that his only operational opinion was that patrolling was too dangerous, started looking for a replacement for James. Colonel James was relieved by Colonel Thomas on September 24, 1942, and ordered back to the United States.

Although they were distant cousins, James left Guadalcanal as bitter enemy of Thomas. Vandegrift recommended James for the promotion of brigadier general, which was ultimately not approved. Upon his return, James assumed command of Marine Corps Base San Diego, California, and had the opportunity to train the men who benefited from his experience during the Guadalcanal Campaign. He held this assignment until the end of April 1944, when he was replaced by Brigadier General Matthew H. Kingman.

He was ordered back to the Pacific area in May 1944 and attached to the staff of V Amphibious Corps under Major General Harry Schmidt as deputy chief of staff, Military Government Section. James participated in the Marianas Islands Campaign and subsequently was attached to Military Government command on Tinian as deputy chief civil affairs officer.

While in this capacity, James was commended by Brigadier General Frederick V. H. Kimble, Commanding General Tinian Garrison Force, for his "cheerful and optimistic attitude in relieving and organizing a destitute people quickly bestowed a spirit of high morale which was daily reflected in the cooperative attitude of Tinian civilians."

== Later career ==
James assumed command of Forward Echelon, Fleet Marine Force, Pacific, on Oahu, Hawaii, and held this assignment until June 1945. However, his career gained some satisfaction when he was promoted to the rank of brigadier general in July 1945 and appointed assistant director of personnel and deputy to Major General Thomas E. Watson at Headquarters Marine Corps.

His transfer to Headquarters Marine Corps was no coincidence, because general Watson had a grudge against now-brigadier general Gerald C. Thomas, director of plans and policies at Headquarters Marine Corps and he needed an ally. He believed that Thomas had isolated general Vandegrift from all his old friends, which included Watson. Aware of James's grudge against Thomas, Watson requested James as his deputy. General James served as assistant director of personnel until November 1946, when he was retired after 30 years of commissioned service.

Brigadier General William C. James died on September 30, 1974, in Daytona Beach, Florida. He and his wife were survived by their son, William C. James Jr. who also served in the Marines and commanded a mortar platoon during the Marshall Islands campaign.

== Decorations ==
Here is the ribbon bar of Brigadier General William C. James:

1st Row	Navy Presidential Unit Citation with one star	World War I Victory Medal	Marine Corps Expeditionary Medal
2nd Row	Second Nicaraguan Campaign Medal	China Service Medal	American Defense Service Medal
3rd Row	Asiatic-Pacific Campaign Medal with three 3/16 inch service stars	American Campaign Medal	World War II Victory Medal
