= China Bomb =

1967 novel by Richard Tregaskis

China Bomb is a near-future novel written by Richard Tregaskis. It follows the exploits of an elite U.S. attack force in their planning and efforts to thwart an attack by the Communist Chinese on the U.S. Seventh Fleet. On the island of Hainan, the Chinese have constructed a powerful H-bomb, which they plan to drop within a matter of days after American spy sources have found out about it. The attack team has to be assembled and sent off by submarine to Hainan to destroy the bomb before it is dropped. In addition, the President of the United States has to out-fox a recalcitrant senator who disapproves of covert activities.

Publishing data: Hardback: Ives Washburn: New York; 1967.
