= Battle of Port-au-Prince (1920) =

Battle during the Banana Wars

- Part of the United States occupation of Haiti, Banana Wars
Date	15 January 1920
Location	Port-au-Prince, Haiti 18.533°N 72.333°W
Result	American-Haitian government victory

Belligerents
United States (Haiti) Haitian government	(Haiti) Cacos

Commanders and leaders
(United States) Gerald Thomas	(Haiti) Benoît Batraville

Strength
Unknown	300+ rebels

Casualties and losses
1 Marine killed 6 Marines wounded	116+ killed "Many more" wounded and captured

The Battle of Port-au-Prince, or "la débâcle", took place on January 15, 1920 when Haitian rebels, known as Cacos, attacked the capital of Haiti during the Second Caco War and the American occupation of Haiti.

At 4:00 a.m., "more than 300" Caco rebels, many wearing stolen uniforms of the Haitian gendarmes, commanded by Benoît Batraville, attacked the city. The Cacos moved into Port-au-Prince in columns, "with flags and conch horns blowing", only to be gunned down by Browning Automatic Rifle (BAR) and Lewis gun fire. It turns out that the city's garrison of US Marines and Haitian gendarmes were ready for the assault, since a citizen who heard the Cacos coming informed the former. The Cacos were forced to break ranks and seek shelter in buildings, where they proceeded to snipe from windows and from around corners. One Caco group attacked the city's slums and set a block on fire, which lit up "the entire surrounding countryside".

One of the defenders' patrols, a detachment of ten US Marines led by Lieutenant Gerald Thomas, met a Caco force on the waterfront that was headed for the National Bank. Near the Iron Market, "a large number" of rebels was spotted coming down the street. Thomas loaded his detachment of marines into a truck to engage the incoming force of Caco insurgents. The truck carrying the Marines moved past the arcades and iron-grilled buildings of the city's central marketplace. After seeing the flashes of rifles up the street, Thomas ordered his Marines off the truck and into the arcade on the right side of the street. The Marine patrol jogged by bounds from pillar to pillar. Thomas spotted the head of a column of Cacos emerge from a side street and ordered his Marines who were hidden by the darkness of the arcade into a hasty ambush. When the Haitian Caco rebels closed to fifty yards or less, Thomas and his fellow marines executed their ambush and opened fire with eight Springfield rifles and two BARs decimating the column of Caco rebels and conflicting heavy casualties. The surviving Cacos broke off the action within ten minutes and fled the city. However, Thomas saw that seven of his fellow Marines in return were hit, two seriously wounded. Thomas sent the two seriously wounded back to headquarters in the truck and led the remaining seven Marines to a sugar company compound. One of the seriously wounded who later died of his injuries was Private Lencil Combs.

"Fully a fifth" of the Caco attackers were killed, according to one estimate. Another source puts the number of rebel dead at 66, plus "many more" wounded and captured. One of the dead was Solomon Janvier, a Port-au-Prince resident and one of the leaders of the attack. The surviving Cacos would remember the battle as "la débâcle". With the arrival of daylight, "patrols moved east and north of the city", killing "more than fifty" additional rebels.
