= Guadalcanal Diary (film) =

1943 World War II war film directed by Lewis Seiler

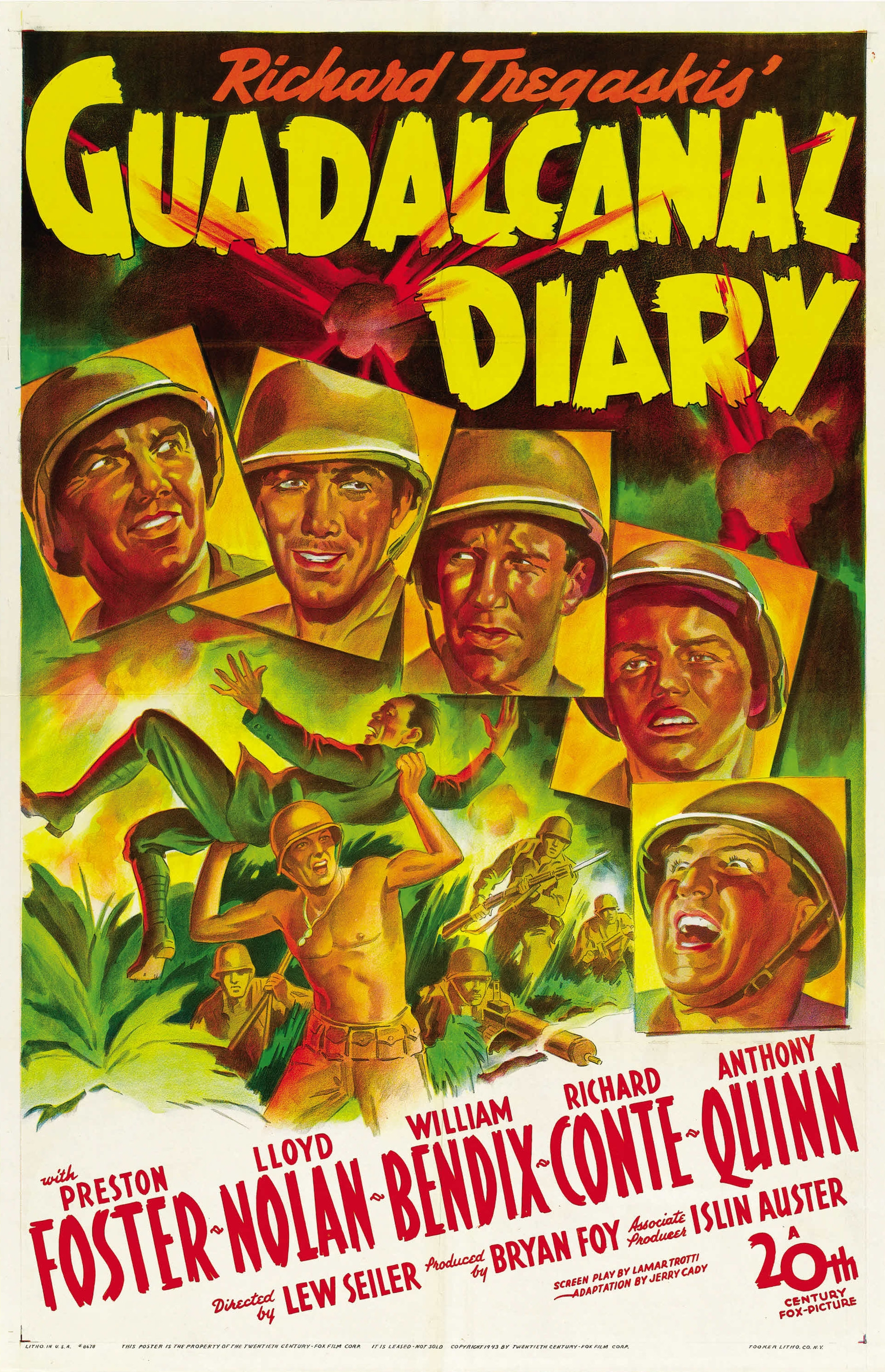
- Theatrical release poster
- Directed by: Lewis Seiler
- Screenplay by: Lamar Trotti; Jerome Cady
- Based on: the book by Richard Tregaskis
- Produced by: Bryan Foy
- Starring: Preston Foster; Lloyd Nolan; William Bendix; Richard Conte; Anthony Quinn; Richard Jaeckel
- Cinematography: Charles G. Clarke
- Edited by: Fred Allen
- Music by: David Buttolph
- Distributed by: 20th Century Fox
- Release date: November 5, 1943 (United States)
- Running time: 93 minutes
- Country: United States
- Language: English
- Box office: $2.7 million (US rentals) or $3 million

Guadalcanal Diary is a 1943 World War II war film directed by Lewis Seiler, featuring Preston Foster, Lloyd Nolan, William Bendix, Richard Conte, Anthony Quinn and the film debut of Richard Jaeckel. It is based on the book of the same name by Richard Tregaskis.

The film recounts the fight of the United States Marines in the Battle of Guadalcanal, which occurred only a year before the movie's release. While the film has notable battle scenes, its primary focus is on the characters and back stories of the Marines. The film adapted the story of the Goettge Patrol, led by Lieutenant Colonel Frank Goettge.

The movie was produced by Bryan Foy, who also produced Berlin Correspondent (1942), Chetniks! The Fighting Guerrillas (1943), and PT 109 (1963).

== Plot summary ==
On July 26, 1942, the 1st Marine Division is sailing towards Guadalcanal. On August 7, the Marines land on Guadalcanal with no initial opposition. They find an abandoned village and capture an airfield, which the Americans work to complete, and rename it Henderson Field. Based on a tip from a Japanese deserter, the Marines leave by boat for the village of Matanikau, where there are supposedly a large number of Japanese troops who want to surrender. On the way, one boat is destroyed by a Japanese submarine before it is sunk by onshore Marine artillery.

The Marines walk into a trap, and only Private Soose Alvarez survives to make it back to American lines. The Marines then march on Matanikau in force and on the way, Private "Chicken" Anderson is wounded by a Japanese officer, who pretended to be dead. The Marines enjoy mail call but suffer Japanese air force bombing raids. Army troops land to support the Marines. They launch a campaign to root Japanese troops out of a series of caves and try to listen to the results of Game Two of the 1942 World Series, but static unfortunately prevents them from hearing the final score.

The Marines are both shelled by the Japanese navy and bombed by their air force. A force of Marine fighter planes land on the island. All the Marines write letters home. They launch an attack on the Japanese during which Alvarez is killed. The Marines are relieved and evacuated from the island.

== Cast ==
- Preston Foster as Father Donnelly
- Lloyd Nolan as Gunnery Sgt. Hook Malone
- William Bendix as Corporal Aloysius T. "Taxi" Potts
- Richard Conte as Captain Don Davis
- Anthony Quinn as Private Jesus "Soose" Alvarez
- Richard Jaeckel as Private Johnny "Chicken" Anderson
- Roy Roberts as Captain James Cross
- Minor Watson as Colonel Wallace E. Grayson
- Ralph Byrd as Ned Rowman
- Lionel Stander as Master Technical Sergeant Butch
- Reed Hadley as War correspondent / Narrator
- John Archer as Lieutenant Thurmond
- Eddie Acuff as Private "Tex" Mcllovy (uncredited)
- Bob Rose as Private Sammy Kline (uncredited)

== Production notes ==
Guadalcanal Diary was shot from May 14 to late July, 1943, mostly on location at Camp Pendleton, near Oceanside, California. Many of the Marines stationed there were filmed on maneuvers, and others appeared in the picture in small speaking parts or as extras. The picture marked the screen debuts of stage actor Robert Rose and Richard Jaeckel, who was a studio messenger boy when he was cast in the production. On February 28, 1944, Foster, Bendix, Nolan and Jaeckel reprised their roles for the Lux Radio Theatre presentation of Guadalcanal Diary.

The film was partly based on the experiences of surviving Marines from the ill-fated Goettge patrol during the Battle of Guadalcanal. Captain James Cross represented the patrol's leader, Lieutenant Colonel Frank Goettge, who was killed during the patrol. Private Soose Alvarez, the lone surviving Marine in the movie's patrol, was based on Sergeant Frank Few, one of the Goettge patrol's survivors.

== Reception ==
Bosley Crowther of The New York Times called the film "stirring and inspiring in many ways" and particularly praised the first part of the film as "almost documentarily real" but also criticized historical inaccuracies in the film's presentation of the battle as well as "comparatively routine" fighting scenes. Variety wrote: "It is at times a sobering film and at other times an exalting one. It is also an almost continuously entertaining one." Harrison's Reports wrote, "Excellent! ... The producers rate a salute for having treated their subject with the honesty and dignity it deserves."

However, David Lardner of The New Yorker wrote a negative review, criticizing the film for containing "every cliché known to man" and for the Marines being depicted as having "altogether too soft a time ... None of the mood of just sitting and taking it until you don't remember where you are any more or how you got there is put across on the screen."
