= Richard Tregaskis =

American journalist

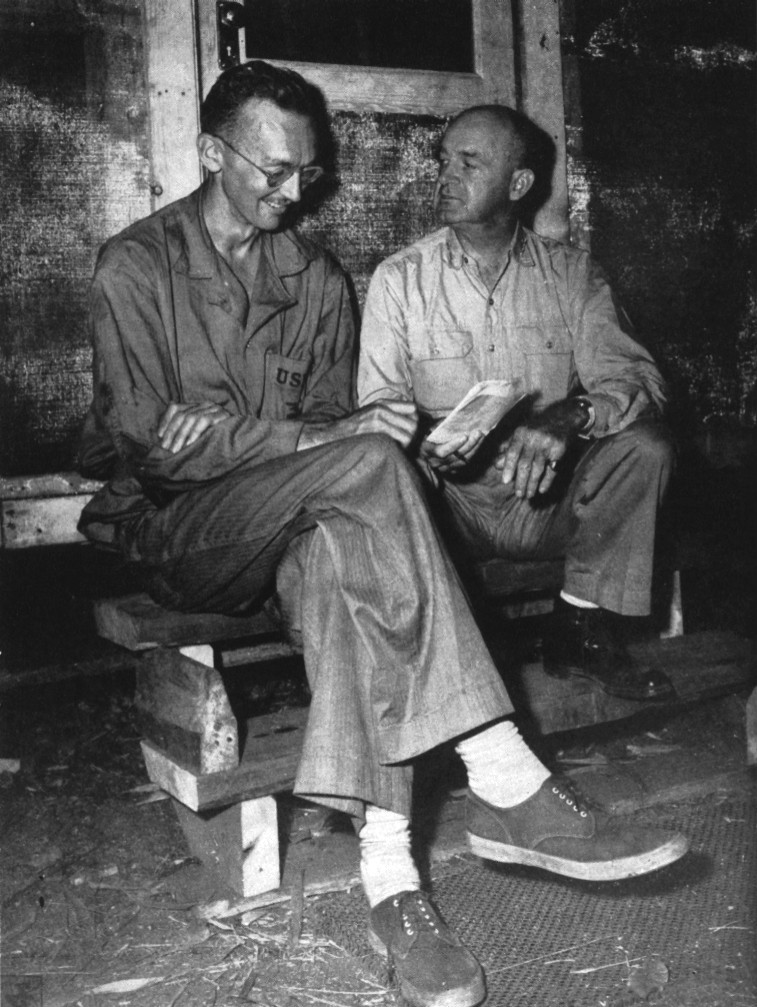
An official U.S. Marine Corps photograph of Richard Tregaskis (left) with Major General Alexander A. Vandegrift, ca. 1942

Richard William Tregaskis (November 28, 1916 – August 15, 1973) was an American journalist and author whose best-known work is Guadalcanal Diary (1943), an account of the first several weeks (in August - September 1942) of the U.S. Marine Corps invasion of Guadalcanal in the Solomon Islands during World War II. This was actually a six-month-long campaign. Tregaskis served as a war correspondent during World War II, the Korean War, and the Vietnam War.

== Education and career ==
Born in Elizabeth, New Jersey, Tregaskis attended the Pingry School in Elizabeth and the Peddie School in Hightstown, New Jersey, before going to college at Harvard University. Prior to World War II he worked as a journalist for the Boston American Record newspaper. His family name is of Cornish origin. He was 6 feet 7 inches (201 cm) tall.

Shortly after the U.S. entered World War II, Tregaskis volunteered as a combat correspondent representing the International News Service.

Assigned to cover the war in the Pacific, Tregaskis spent part of August and most of September, 1942 reporting on Marines on Guadalcanal, a pivotal campaign in the war against Japan. He subsequently covered the war in Europe against Germany and Italy.

Tregaskis' most renowned book, Guadalcanal Diary, recorded his experiences with the Marines on Guadalcanal. As the jacket of the book's first edition noted, "This is a new chapter in the story of the United States Marines. Because it was written by a crack newspaperman, who knew how to do his job. ... Until the author's departure in a B-17 bomber on September 26th, he ate, slept, and sweated with our front-line units. His story is the straight day-by-day account of what he himself saw or learned from eyewitnesses during those seven weeks."

As a testimony to the power of Tregaskis' writing, Guadalcanal Diary is still considered essential reading by present-day U.S. military personnel. A modern edition is available with an introduction by Mark Bowden, author of Black Hawk Down. The diary was later made into a film of the same title in 1943.

He covered the Allied invasion of Sicily and the Allied invasion of Italy, recording his experiences in Invasion Diary. He was seriously wounded by German mortar fire while serving with paratroops and US Rangers near Cassino where he was hospitalized for five months, temporarily lost his speech, and had two operations during which a plate was fixed in his skull.

Tregaskis later covered Cold War-era conflicts in China, Korea, and Vietnam. During the Vietnam War, Tregaskis reported on the growing conflict for a decade and accompanied U.S. Marines in command of local ARVN troops recorded in his book Vietnam Diary. Bernard Fall, a contemporary scholar on Vietnam, included it in his bibliography for the 1967 edition of Street Without Joy, cautioning that it was "overoptimistic and overdrawn."

Tregaskis' second wife, Moana, followed him to Vietnam, where she put her skills to work as an anthropologist, photographing and documenting the impact of war on soldiers and civilians alike.

In 1964, the Overseas Press Club presented Tregaskis with the George Polk Award for first-person reporting under hazardous circumstances. A shrapnel-gouged helmet worn by Tregaskis during World War II is on display at the National Museum of the Marine Corps. Tregaskis was wearing the helmet in Italy in 1943 when a shell fragment pierced the helmet and his skull, nearly killing him.

Tregaskis died at age 56, when he suffered a heart attack while swimming near his home in Hawaii and drowned. He was given a traditional Hawaiian funeral and his ashes were scattered off Waikiki Beach.

The Richard Tregaskis papers are on file in the American Heritage Center at the University of Wyoming in Laramie.

In 2021 Moana Tregaskis through JMFdeA Press published Vietnam Diary, Invasion Diary, Stronger Than Fear, Last Plane to Shanghai, and China Bomb as part of the Richard Tregaskis Classics Collection.

== In popular culture ==
The alternative band Guadalcanal Diary took its name from Tregaskis' book.

== Bibliography ==
Tregaskis' books include:

- Guadalcanal Diary (1943)
- Invasion Diary (1944)
- Stronger Than Fear (1945) (novel)
- Seven Leagues to Paradise (1951)
- Guadalcanal Diary (1955) (Revised, updated version)
- X-15 Diary: The Story Of America's First Space Ship (1961)
- Last Plane to Shanghai (1961)
- John F. Kennedy: War Hero (1962)
- John F. Kennedy and PT-109 (children’s book, 1962)
- Vietnam Diary (1963)
- China Bomb (1967) (novel)
- Warrior King: Hawaii's Kamehameha the Great (1973)
- Southeast Asia: Building the Bases, The History of Construction in Southeast Asia (1975)
