= Gerald C. Thomas =

United States Marine Corps general

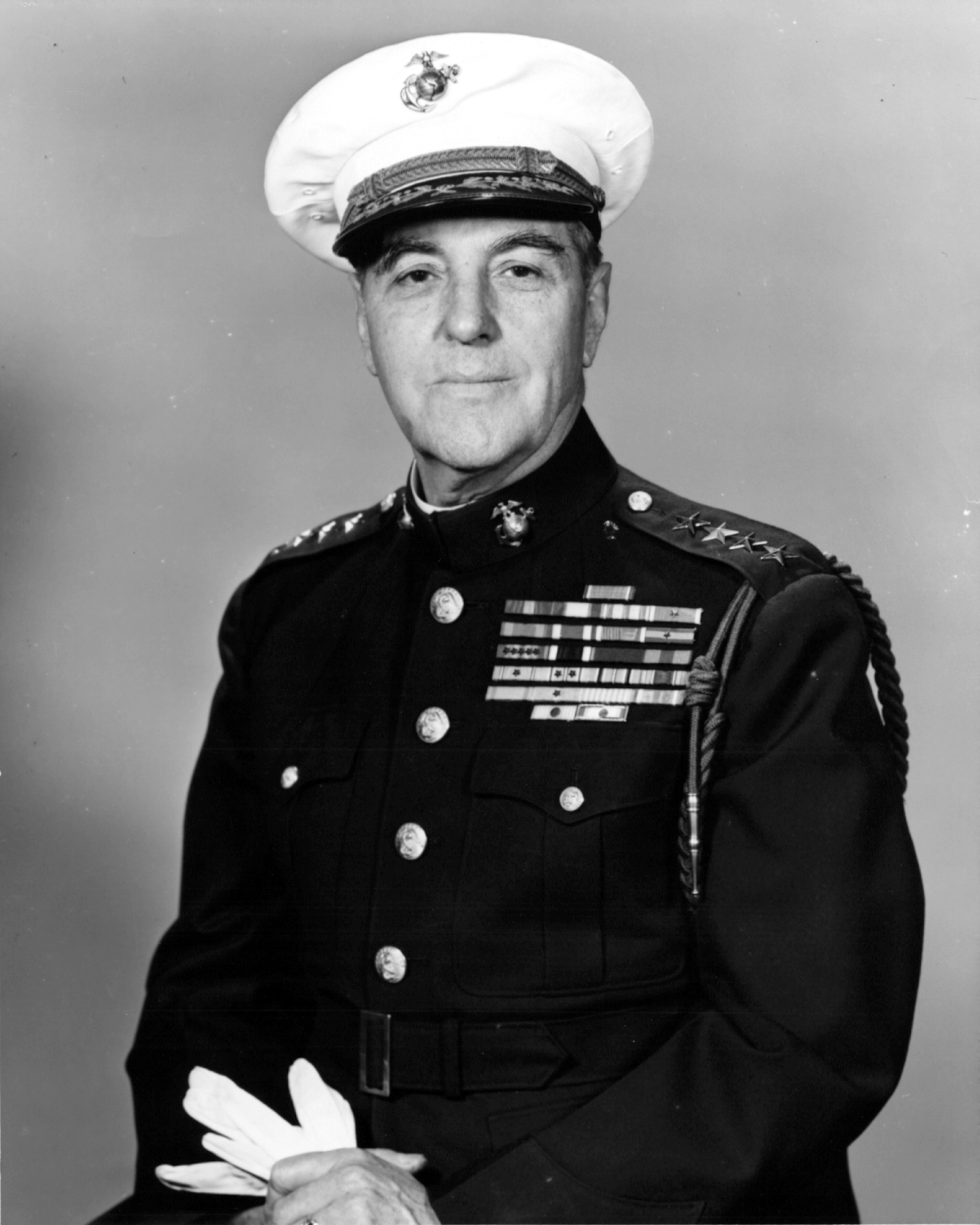
- Gerald Carthrae Thomas, USMC
- Born: October 29, 1894; Slater, Missouri, U.S.
- Died: April 7, 1984 (aged 89); Washington, D.C., U.S.
- Burial place: Arlington National Cemetery
- Military career
- Allegiance: United States of America
- Branch: United States Marine Corps
- Service years: 1917–1956
- Rank: General
- Nickname: "Jerry"
- Commands: Fleet Marine Force, Western Pacific; 1st Marine Division; Assistant Commandant of the Marine Corps (1952–1954); Marine Corps Schools, Quantico
- Conflicts: World War I; Battle of Belleau Wood; Battle of Soissons; Banana Wars; Haiti intervention; Battle of Port-au-Prince; World War II; Battle of Guadalcanal; Battle of Tulagi; Operation Cartwheel; Korean War
- Awards: Distinguished Service Cross; Distinguished Service Medal (Navy); Distinguished Service Medal (U.S. Army); Silver Star; Legion of Merit (2); Purple Heart; French Fourragere

Gerald Carthrae Thomas (October 29, 1894 – April 7, 1984) was a United States Marine Corps general who served as Assistant Commandant of the Marine Corps. He retired from the Marine Corps in 1956 with more than 38 years of distinguished service which included duty on four continents, spanning the two World Wars, Haiti, and the Korean War. During World War I, he fought in major offensives, including the Battle of Belleau Wood, and was awarded the Silver Star and the Purple Heart.

== Biography ==
Gerald Carthrae Thomas was born on October 29, 1894, in Slater, Missouri.

Thomas was attending Illinois Wesleyan University at the start of World War I. When the U.S. entered the war and a call was made for men, Gerald, then a sophomore, enlisted for military service. He was awarded a degree of Doctor of Laws by his alma mater on February 10, 1954.

== Marine Corps service ==
Gerald enlisted in the Marine Corps on May 28, 1917. He completed boot camp at Parris Island then joined the 1st Battalion 6th Marines.

=== World War I ===
Sailing for France in September 1917, Thomas saw action with the 6th Marines at Belleau Wood, Soissons, and in the Meuse–Argonne offensive (Champagne). He was promoted to sergeant and served as an intelligence sergeant. During the Battle of Belleau Wood, he led a squad of Marines and received the Silver Star for bravery. At Soissons, his company sustained heavy losses and he became the acting platoon leader. In September 1918, he was commissioned a second lieutenant. During his World War I service, in addition to the award of the Silver Star for valor, he was awarded the Purple Heart for wounds received in battle, and as a member of the 6th Marine Regiment, he became entitled to wear the French Fourragere. After participating in the occupation of Germany, he returned to the United States in July 1919.

=== Occupation of Haiti ===
In November 1919, he joined the 1st Provisional Marine Brigade in Haiti, taking part in action against Haitian insurgent forces until May 1921. During this time, he participated in the Battle of Port-au-Prince, where he successfully ambushed a column of Caco rebels. In August 1921, he was assigned to the Marine barracks at Quantico, where he remained for the next two years. During that time he was detached for several months of duty with the guard company at the Disarmament Conference in Washington. He also completed the Company Officers Course at the Marine Corps Schools.

=== 1920s–1930s ===
From November 1923 to October 1925, Thomas commanded the Marine Detachment aboard the USS Tulsa. He was then stationed for two years at the Marine Barracks, Navy Yard, Charleston, South Carolina, and for a year at Camp Holabird, Maryland, where he completed a course in the Army Motor Transport School. In December 1928, after serving as Officer-in-Charge of Land Transportation at the Marine Barracks, Parris Island, South Carolina, he joined the 1st Brigade Marines in Haiti, and became aide to the commanding general. He returned to the United States in June 1931, entering the Army Infantry School at Fort Benning, Georgia, the following September.

Graduating in June 1932, Thomas was made an instructor in the Basic School at the Philadelphia Navy Yard. He remained there until August 1934, when he was ordered back to Quantico as a student in the Senior Course. After completing that course, he was ordered to China in July 1935, for duty with the Marine Detachment at the American Embassy in Peiping. He returned to the United States two years later to attend the Command and General Staff School at Fort Leavenworth, Kansas, and after graduating in June 1938, he joined the staff of the Marine Corps Schools at Quantico.

=== World War II ===
In May 1941, Thomas was transferred to Cairo, Egypt, as a naval observer, but he was recalled to Quantico two months later to become assistant operations officer of the 1st Marine Division. Named Operations Officer of the division in March 1942, he sailed for the South Pacific in that capacity two months later. He was awarded the Navy Distinguished Service Medal for his efforts in the assault and capture of Guadalcanal and Tulagi. He was appointed chief of staff of the division in September 1942, at Guadalcanal, and in July 1943, he became chief of staff of the 1st Marine Amphibious Corps, where he was awarded the Legion of Merit with Combat "V" in the Treasury-Bougainville operation. After participating in the Empress Augusta Bay operation at Bougainville, he returned to Marine Corps Headquarters in Washington, D.C., where he was made director of Plans and Policies in January 1944 and awarded a second Legion of Merit for outstanding service from January 1944 to November 1946.

In July 1947, Thomas was named commanding general of Fleet Marine Force, Western Pacific. After that unit was disbanded in March 1949, he became chief of staff of the Marine Corps Equipment Board at Quantico, later serving there as commanding general of the Landing Force Development Center.

=== Korean War ===
Thomas took command of the 1st Marine Division during the Korean War in April 1951, where he earned the Army Distinguished Service Cross and Army Distinguished Service Medal. He served in that capacity until January 1952, when he was relieved by Major General John T. Selden and returned to the United States. The following month he was promoted to the rank of lieutenant general and designated by President Truman as assistant commandant of the Marine Corps. He served in that billet until June 1954, and the following month became commandant of the Marine Corps Schools, Quantico.

== Retirement and death ==
He retired from the Marine Corps and was promoted to the rank of general on January 1, 1956.

From 1957 to 1958, he was the first director of the National Security Council (NSC) Net Evaluation Subcommittee (NESC); succeeded by Thomas Hickey.

Thomas died on April 7, 1984, at his Washington, D.C. home. He is buried in Arlington National Cemetery.

== Awards and decorations ==
General Thomas' medals and decorations include:

1st Row	Distinguished Service Cross	Navy Distinguished Service Medal	Army Distinguished Service Medal	Silver Star	French Fourragère
2nd Row	Legion of Merit w/ 1 award star & valor device	Purple Heart	Air Medal w/ 2 award stars	Navy and Marine Corps Commendation Medal	French Fourragère
3rd Row	Navy Presidential Unit Citation w/ 1 service star	Marine Corps Good Conduct Medal	Marine Corps Expeditionary Medal	World War I Victory Medal w/ 5 clasps	French Fourragère
4th Row	Army of Occupation of Germany Medal	China Service Medal	American Defense Service Medal w/ Base clasp	American Campaign Medal	French Fourragère
5th Row	Asiatic-Pacific Campaign Medal w/ 2 service stars	World War II Victory Medal	National Defense Service Medal	Korean Service Medal w/ 1 service star	French Fourragère
6th Row	Order of Orange-Nassau, Commander w/ crossed swords	Order of National Security Merit, Gugseon Medal	Korean Presidential Unit Citation	United Nations Korea Medal	French Fourragère

== See also ==
- Battle of Belleau Wood
- Assistant Commandant of the Marine Corps
