= Guadalcanal Diary (book) =

1943 memoir by Richard Tregaskis

- First edition
- Author: Richard Tregaskis
- Subject: Guadalcanal, World War II
- Publisher: Random House
- Publication date: 1943

Guadalcanal Diary is a memoir written by war correspondent Richard Tregaskis and originally published by Random House on January 1, 1943. The book recounts the author's time with the United States Marine Corps on Guadalcanal in the early stages of the pivotal months-long battle there starting in 1942. It was the first book published by Random House to sell more than 100,000 copies.

Almost immediately after publication, the memoir was made into a movie of the same name featuring William Bendix, Richard Conte, Anthony Quinn, and John Archer, marking the movie debut of Richard Jaeckel.

== Synopsis ==
The book chronicles the author's experiences as a war correspondent for the International News Service (INS) during the first seven weeks of the Guadalcanal campaign, from the first landings on August 7, 1942 to his departure on September 26, 1942. Tregaskis was also around for Operation Dovetail, a practice run for the Guadalcanal landings, but while he was on board one of the troop transports involved, his book does not cover the operation or him being at Koro Island, where the operation took place.

Tregaskis relates combat and conversation in vernacular, citing the full name, rank, and hometown of each of the Marines he encountered during the weeks he was on the island.

== Background ==
During his time on the frontlines with troops from the United States Marine Corps, Tregaskis wrote down what he saw onto various small notebooks, which he stored in his pockets and had numbered for easier reference. At night, he would compile the information into his diary, adding references to specific books in the event he wanted to publish his journal as a full-length book.

On September 25, Tregaskis flew out of the island to New Caledonia and then boarded a flight for Honolulu, where he began writing Guadalcanal Diary. Due to wartime media regulations, he had to write the book under supervision at the Navy offices at Pearl Harbor, and his diary was kept in a safe during the night. (Tregaskis never got the diary back.) According to a follow-up essay Tregaskis wrote in 1964, his manuscript was subject to military censorship by the Office of Naval Intelligence. For example, one of the Naval Intelligence officers excised a portion about Japanese encampments smelling "sweet-ish"; the officer, according to Tregaskis, was "apparently" worried about Japanese troops reading the book and using deodorant to hide their camps.

Tregaskis finished his manuscript in November 1942 and sent it over to Barris Faris, editor-in-chief of the INS, who in turn sent it over to Ward Greene, head editor of King Features Syndicate. Greene then sent it out to nine other publishers for bidding, an unusual practice at the time. Bennett Cerf, one of the founders of Random House, received his copy on November 11, read it from beginning to end that night, and called Greene the next day to secure publishing rights, anticipating a high demand for stories about the Guadalcanal campaign. Random House rushed Guadalcanal Diary into print and published the book on January 18, 1943.

== Reception ==
Guadalcanal Diary sold over 100,000 copies, becoming the first book by Random House to reach such sales numbers. It occupied the #1 spot on the New York Herald Tribune Best Seller List and The New York Times Best Seller list, staying on the latter for 15 weeks. According to one of the author's later books, it was subsequently made required reading for all USMC officer candidates. A 1943 survey conducted by the American Library Association reported that the book was immensely popular among all age groups, including teenagers and younger children. The book became so widely known that, according to a contemporary article in American Speech, "diary writers" became Army slang for Marines.

Most, but not all, reviewers praised the book's writing style. Irving Brant, a historian and journalist writing for The New Republic, called it "as brilliant a literary style as a wooden Indian" and felt that it was so immersive that adding any literary flourishes would diminish its prose. Writer Marcus Duffield also enjoyed the book's style; in his review for The Nation, he wrote that it was "never a dull diary", citing its "eye for detail, refreshing lack of self-consciousness or artifice, and humor." Similarly, Jacob C. Meyer, a historian and professor at Western Reserve University, opined in a review The Far Eastern Quarterly that Tregaskis never wrote more than what was necessary for understanding. Meanwhile, in his review for the New York Times, John Chamberlain wrote that he felt the book was repetitive at times but still found it enjoyable and recommended it as a "tonic for the war-weary on the homefront". Mark Gayn's review for The Saturday Review of Literature considered it "an honest book", but found it flat and forgettable, suggesting it might have been better had Tregaskis given it more artistic flair. Clifton Fadiman of The New Yorker called it "rough" and "artless" and wrote that it had a "total lack of literary finish," but thought it made up for it with its "on-the-spot quality."

Reviewers generally thought that the book was informative and unbiased. Brant called it a "factual recital" that heightened his understanding of the mindset of the Marines, and Duffield found it generally illuminating, claiming that the news dispatches of the days were so censored and "chopped-up" that they made the Guadalcanal campaign feel unreal. R.L. Duffus, a reviewer for the New York Times, echoed a similar sentiment; he praised Tregaskis and other reporters who saw the conflict first-hand for their ability to elucidate the "sternly stripped facts" of official war dispatches, opining that "American journalism is writing its brightest pages in this war." He also commended Tregaskis for writing about Guadalcanal "without sentimentality or heroics". In contrast, while Meyer did not observe any bias in the book's point of view, he still urged future scholars to consider the limits of its perspective, encouraging them to consider "whether the reporter told all that he knew and thought important or whether he was limited by conditions which did not permit such a report."

== See also ==
- Guadalcanal Campaign
