= Annie Graham =

Annie Graham may refer to:

- Annie Neal Graham (1929–2002), the first African-American female to enlist in the United States Marine Corps
- Annie Ruth Graham (1916–1968), U.S. Army officer, the highest-ranked American servicewoman to die during the Vietnam War

== See also ==
- Ann Graham (disambiguation)
