= List of 1st Marine Division commanders =

1st Marine Division Insignia

The 1st Marine Division is a Marine infantry division of the United States Marine Corps headquartered at Marine Corps Base Camp Pendleton, California. It is the ground combat element of the I Marine Expeditionary Force (I MEF).

== History ==
Founded in 1941, with individual units dating back before then, it is the oldest and largest active duty division in the United States Marine Corps, representing a combat-ready force of more than 19,000 men and women. It is one of three active duty divisions in the Marine Corps today and is a multi-role, expeditionary ground combat force. It is nicknamed "The Old Breed".

The 1st Division saw combat service during almost all major conflicts during the 20th century. It participated in World War I (only 5th and 11th Marine Regiments of the future Division served in France), World War II, Korean War, Vietnam War, Gulf War, Somali Civil War, Iraq War and War in Afghanistan.

== Commanding generals ==
#	Picture	Name	Rank	Start	End	Notability	Ref
1		Holland Smith	Major general	February 1, 1941	June 13, 1941	"Father" of modern U.S. amphibious warfare; Navy Distinguished Service Medal with four 5/16 inch gold stars; commanding general of Fleet Marine Force, Pacific and also served as Assistant Commandant of the Marine Corps	
2		Philip H. Torrey	Major general	June 14, 1941	March 22, 1942	Director of Marine Corps Reserve and later Commanding general of the Marine Corps Base Quantico during World War II	
3		Alexander Vandegrift	Major general	March 23, 1942	July 7, 1943	Commander of I Marine Amphibious Corps and later served as 18th Commandant of the Marine Corps, first U.S. Marine to hold the rank of four-star general while on active duty; Medal of Honor, Navy Cross, Navy Distinguished Service Medal	
4		William H. Rupertus	Major general	July 8, 1943	November 1, 1944	Commander of 4th Marine Regiment and he is the author of the Rifleman's Creed; Navy Cross, Navy Distinguished Service Medal, Army Distinguished Service Medal	
5		Pedro del Valle	Major general	November 2, 1944	August 8, 1945	Veteran of Guadalcanal and Okinawa Campaigns. Del Valle became the first Hispanic to reach the rank of Lieutenant general; Navy Distinguished Service Medal, two Legion of Merit and Navy and Marine Corps Medal	
6		Dewitt Peck	Major general	August 9, 1945	June 9, 1946	Served as Assistant Commandant of the Marine Corps, commanding officer of 4th Marine Regiment in Shanghai, China; Legion of Merit with Gold star	
7		Keller E. Rockey	Major general	June 10, 1946	September 17, 1946	Served as Assistant Commandant of the Marine Corps, commanding general of Fleet Marine Force, Atlantic, 5th Marine Division, III Amphibious Corps; Navy Cross with Gold star, Distinguished Service Cross, Navy Distinguished Service Medal and Army Distinguished Service Medal	
8		Samuel L. Howard	Major general	September 18, 1946	June 17, 1947	Captured by the Japanese at Corregidor and held as a POW until 1945. Later served as Inspector General of the Marine Corps; Navy Cross	
9		Alva B. Lasswell (Acting)	Colonel	June 18, 1947	July 6, 1947	Served with the Naval Communications during World War II; Legion of Merit	
10		Graves B. Erskine	Major general	July 7, 1947	July 25, 1950	Veteran of the Pacific War, commanded 3rd Marine Division, Fleet Marine Force, Atlantic or Camp Pendleton; Navy Distinguished Service Medal, Silver Star, two awards of Legion of Merit (2) with Combat "V"	
11		Oliver P. Smith	Major general	July 26, 1950	February 23, 1951	Veteran of Battles at Guadalcanal, Peleliu, Cape Gloucester and Okinawa and Korean War. Assistant Commandant of the Marine Corps, commander of the Fleet Marine Force, Atlantic or Camp Pendleton; Distinguished Service Cross, Navy Distinguished Service Medal and Army Distinguished Service Medal	
12		Chesty Puller (Acting)	Brigadier general	February 24, 1951	March 4, 1951	Veteran of the Pacific War and Korean War, commander of the 1st Marine Regiment and 2nd Marine Division; Five awards of Navy Cross, Distinguished Service Cross	
13		Oliver P. Smith	Major general	March 5, 1951	April 26, 1951	Veteran of Battles at Guadalcanal, Peleliu, Cape Gloucester and Okinawa and Korean War. Assistant Commandant of the Marine Corps, commander of the Fleet Marine Force, Atlantic or Camp Pendleton; Distinguished Service Cross, Navy Distinguished Service Medal and Army Distinguished Service Medal	
14		Gerald C. Thomas	Major general	April 27, 1951	January 10, 1952	Veteran of World War I, World War II and Korean War. Assistant Commandant of the Marine Corps; Distinguished Service Cross, Navy Distinguished Service Medal and Army Distinguished Service Medal	
15		John T. Selden	Major general	January 11, 1952	August 28, 1952	Veteran of World War I, World War II and Korean War, commanding general of Camp Pendleton; Army Distinguished Service Medal, two awards of Legion of Merit	
16		Edwin A. Pollock	Major general	August 29, 1952	June 15, 1953	Veteran of the Pacific War and Korean War. Commanded Fleet Marine Force, Pacific and Fleet Marine Force, Atlantic; Navy Cross, Army Distinguished Service Medal	
17		Randolph M. Pate	Major general	June 16, 1953	May 11, 1954	Veteran of the Pacific War and Korean War. Commandant of the Marine Corps from 1956 to 1959; Navy Distinguished Service Medal, Army Distinguished Service Medal	
18		Robert H. Pepper	Major general	May 12, 1954	July 23, 1954	Veteran of World War I, World War II and Korean War. Commanded 3rd Marine Division and Fleet Marine Force, Pacific; Legion of Merit with Combat "V"	
19		Robert E. Hogaboom	Major general	July 24, 1954	January 18, 1955	Veteran of the Pacific War and Korean War. Assistant Division Commander of the 2nd Marine Division; Three awards of Legion of Merit with Combat "V"	
20		Merrill B. Twining	Major general	January 19, 1955	August 17, 1956	Veteran of World War II and Korean War. Commanded 3rd Marine Division; Two awards of Legion of Merit with Combat "V"	
21		Robert O. Bare	Major general	August 18, 1956	June 30, 1957	Veteran of World War II and Korean War; Navy Distinguished Service Medal, Two awards of Legion of Merit with Combat "V"	
22		David M. Shoup	Major general	July 1, 1957	January 2, 1958	Veteran of World War II and Korean War, Commandant of the Marine Corps; Medal of Honor, Navy Distinguished Service Medal, Two awards of Legion of Merit with Combat "V"	
23		Harvey C. Tschirgi (Acting)	Brigadier general	January 3, 1958	February 4, 1958	Veteran of World War II and Korean War, chief of staff of the Marine Corps Recruit Depot Parris Island; Two awards of Legion of Merit with Combat "V" and Bronze Star Medal with Combat "V"	
24		Edward W. Snedeker	Major general	February 5, 1958	October 7, 1959	Veteran of World War II and Korean War; commanded 7th Marine Regiment during Okinawa Campaign; Navy Cross, Silver Star, Three awards of Legion of Merit with Combat "V"; Later served as Commandant of the Marine Corps Schools, Quantico in 1959–1963.	
25		Thomas F. Riley (Acting)	Brigadier general	October 8, 1959	November 13, 1959	Veteran of World War II and Korean War, VMI alumni; Legion of Merit with Combat "V", Bronze Star Medal; Later served as Orange County Supervisor 1974-1994.	
26		Henry R. Paige	Major general	November 14, 1959	June 6, 1961	Veteran of World War II and Korean War; two awards of Legion of Merit with Combat "V", Army Commendation Medal	
27		Frederick E. Leek	Brigadier general	June 7, 1961	July 30, 1961	Veteran of World War II; Legion of Merit with Combat "V", Distinguished Flying Cross	
28		James M. Masters, Sr.	Major general	July 31, 1961	June 14, 1962	Veteran of the Pacific War; United States Naval Academy alumnus; Navy Cross, Navy Distinguished Service Medal, Legion of Merit with Combat "V", Bronze Star Medal	
29		Herman Nickerson Jr.	Major general	June 15, 1962	April 9, 1963	Veteran of World War II, Korean War and Vietnam War; Distinguished Service Cross, two awards of Navy Distinguished Service Medal, Silver Star, three awards of Legion of Merit with Combat "V", Bronze Star Medal	
30		William T. Fairbourn	Major general	April 10, 1963	July 9, 1965	Veteran of World War II and Vietnam War; Legion of Merit with Combat "V", later Nuclear arms race activist	
31		Edward H. Hurst (acting)	Brigadier general	July 10, 1965	August 10, 1965	Veteran of Battle of Okinawa and Battle of Peleliu; Navy Cross, Silver Star, Legion of Merit, Purple Heart, Bronze Star Medal with Combat "V"	
32		Lewis J. Fields	Major general	August 11, 1965	September 30, 1966	Veteran of World War II and Vietnam War; two awards of Navy Distinguished Service Medal, Legion of Merit with Combat "V"	
33		Herman Nickerson Jr.	Major general	October 1, 1966	May 31, 1967	Veteran of World War II, Korean War and Vietnam War; Distinguished Service Cross, two awards of Navy Distinguished Service Medal, Silver Star, three awards of Legion of Merit with Combat "V", Bronze Star Medal	
34		Donn J. Robertson	Major general	June 1, 1967	June 26, 1968	Veteran of World War II and Vietnam War; Navy Cross, two awards of Navy Distinguished Service Medal, Legion of Merit with Combat "V"	
35		Carl A. Youngdale	Major general	June 27, 1968	December 20, 1968	Veteran of Battles at Roi Namur, Saipan, Tinian, Iwo Jima, Korean War and Vietnam War; two awards of Navy Distinguished Service Medal, Silver Star, six awards of Legion of Merit with Combat "V"	
36		Ormond R. Simpson	Major general	December 21, 1968	December 14, 1969	Veteran of World War II, Korean War and Vietnam War; Navy Distinguished Service Medal, four awards of Legion of Merit with Combat "V", Bronze Star Medal	
37		Edwin B. Wheeler	Major general	December 15, 1969	April 26, 1970	Marine Raider, veteran of World War II, Korea and Vietnam War; Navy Distinguished Service Medal, Silver Star, five awards of Legion of Merit with Combat "V",	
38		Charles F. Widdecke	Major general	April 27, 1970	April 29, 1971	Veteran of Battle of Guam, Battle of Eniwetok and Vietnam War; Navy Cross, Navy Distinguished Service Medal, Silver Star, two awards of Legion of Merit with Combat "V",	
39		Ross T. Dwyer	Major general	April 30, 1971	August 10, 1972	Veteran of World War II and Vietnam War; Navy Distinguished Service Medal, three awards of Legion of Merit, Bronze Star Medal with Combat "V",	
40		Adolph G. Schwenk	Major general	August 11, 1972	April 30, 1973	Veteran of World War II, Korean War and Vietnam War; Navy Distinguished Service Medal, two awards of Legion of Merit with Combat "V",	
41		Kenneth J. Houghton	Major general	May 1, 1973	August 12, 1974	Veteran of World War II, Korean War and Vietnam War; Navy Cross, two awards of Silver Star, three awards of Legion of Merit with Combat "V",	
42		William L. McCulloch	Brigadier general	August 13, 1974	June 1, 1975	Veteran of World War II, Korean War and Vietnam War; three awards of Legion of Merit with Combat "V", Bronze Star Medal with Combat "V"	
43		Charles D. Mize	Major general	June 2, 1975	July 29, 1976	Veteran of World War II, Korean War and Vietnam War; Navy Cross, Legion of Merit, two awards of Bronze Star Medal with Combat "V", two awards of Purple Heart	
44		Edward A. Wilcox	Major general	July 30, 1976	July 5, 1977	Veteran of World War II	
45		Marc A. Moore (acting)	Brigadier general	July 6, 1977	August 7, 1977	Veteran of Korean War and Vietnam War; Legion of Merit	
46		Charles G. Cooper	Major general	August 8, 1977	August 8, 1979	Veteran of Korean War and Vietnam War; United States Naval Academy alumni; Navy Distinguished Service Medal, Silver Star, two awards of Legion of Merit	
47		Francis X. Quinn	Major general	August 9, 1979	July 31, 1980	Veteran of World War II, Korean War and Vietnam War; two awards of Silver Star, Legion of Merit with Combat "V", two awards of Purple Heart	
48		James L. Day	Major general	August 1, 1980	August 12, 1982	Medal of Honor recipient; veteran of World War II, Korean War and Vietnam War; Navy Distinguished Service Medal two awards of Silver Star, Legion of Merit with Combat "V", Bronze Star Medal with Combat "V", six awards of Purple Heart	
49		Ernest C. Cheatham Jr.	Major general	August 13, 1982	June 13, 1985	Veteran of Korean War and Vietnam War; Navy Cross, Navy Distinguished Service Medal, Defense Superior Service Medal, Legion of Merit with Combat "V"	
50		Clyde D. Dean	Major general	June 14, 1985	April 23, 1986	Veteran of Vietnam War; Defense Distinguished Service Medal, Legion of Merit with Combat "V"	
51		Matthew T. Cooper	Brigadier general	April 24, 1986	August 13, 1986		
52		James J. McMonagle	Major general	August 14, 1986	July 19, 1988	Veteran of Vietnam War; Legion of Merit with Combat "V"	
53		John P. Monahan	Major general	July 20, 1988	August 7, 1990	Veteran of Vietnam War; United States Naval Academy alumni; Defense Distinguished Service Medal	
54		James M. Myatt	Major general	August 8, 1990	July 8, 1992	Veteran of Vietnam War; Silver Star	
55		Charles E. Wilhelm	Major general	July 9, 1992	December 8, 1992	Veteran of Vietnam War, Gulf War and Somali Civil War; Defense Distinguished Service Medal, Navy Distinguished Service Medal, Silver Star, two awards of Defense Superior Service Medal, Bronze Star Medal with Combat "V"	
56		Jerry C. McAbee (acting)	Brigadier general	December 9, 1992	March 23, 1993	Veteran of Gulf War; Navy Distinguished Service Medal, Defense Superior Service Medal, four awards of Legion of Merit with Combat "V"	
57		Charles E. Wilhelm	Major general	March 24, 1993	June 22, 1994	Veteran of Vietnam War, Gulf War and Somali Civil War; Defense Distinguished Service Medal, Navy Distinguished Service Medal, Silver Star, two awards of Defense Superior Service Medal, Bronze Star Medal with Combat "V"	
58		Frank Libutti	Major general	June 23, 1994	June 6, 1996	Veteran of Vietnam War and Somali Civil War; Defense Distinguished Service Medal, Navy Distinguished Service Medal, Silver Star, three awards of Defense Superior Service Medal, two awards of Legion of Merit and three awards of Purple Heart	
59		John H. Admire	Major general	June 7, 1996	July 24, 1998	Defense Distinguished Service Medal, two awards of Legion of Merit	
60		Michael Hagee	Major general	July 25, 1998	July 24, 1999	Veteran of Vietnam War, Gulf War; three awards of Defense Distinguished Service Medal, three awards of Legion of Merit, Bronze Star Medal with Combat "V"	
61		Gregory S. Newbold	Major general	July 24, 1999	July 11, 2000	Veteran of Gulf War; two awards of Legion of Merit; Openly critical of Donald Rumsfeld's plans for the invasion of Iraq	
62		James T. Conway	Major general	July 11, 2000	August 8, 2002	Served as the 34th Commandant of the Marine Corps; veteran of Gulf War and Iraq War; three awards of Defense Distinguished Service Medal, Navy Distinguished Service Medal, Legion of Merit	
63		James Mattis	Major general	August 9, 2002	August 1, 2004	the 26th United States Secretary of Defense; veteran of Gulf War, Iraq War and War in Afghanistan; two awards of Defense Distinguished Service Medal, Navy Distinguished Service Medal, Legion of Merit and Bronze Star Medal with Combat "V"	
64		Richard F. Natonski	Major general	August 2, 2004	June 1, 2006	Veteran of Vietnam War, Gulf War and Iraq War; Navy Distinguished Service Medal, Legion of Merit	
65		John M. Paxton Jr.	Major general	June 2, 2006	May 22, 2007	the 33rd Assistant Commandant of the Marine Corps; veteran of Vietnam War, Gulf War and Iraq War; Defense Distinguished Service Medal, Navy Distinguished Service Medal, two awards of Legion of Merit, Bronze Star Medal	
66		Richard P. Mills	Brigadier general	May 22, 2007	September 1, 2007	Later commanded Marine Corps Reserve; veteran of Iraq War; Defense Superior Service Medal, Legion of Merit and Bronze Star Medal	
67		Thomas D. Waldhauser	Major general	September 1, 2007	July 1, 2009	Later commanded the United States Africa Command; veteran of Gulf War and Iraq War; two awards of Defense Distinguished Service Medal, two awards of Defense Superior Service Medal, Legion of Merit with Combat "V", Bronze Star Medal	
68		Richard P. Mills	Major general	July 1, 2009	August 1, 2010	Later commanded Marine Corps Reserve; veteran of Iraq War; Defense Superior Service Medal, Legion of Merit and Bronze Star Medal	
69		Michael R. Regner	Major general	August 1, 2010	June 30, 2011	Later served as staff director for Headquarters Marine Corps; veteran of Gulf War, Iraq War and War in Afghanistan; two awards of Defense Superior Service Medal, three awards of Legion of Merit and Bronze Star Medal	
70		Ronald L. Bailey	Major general	June 30, 2011	June 10, 2013	Later served as deputy commandant plans, policies, and operations; two awards of Defense Superior Service Medal, two awards of Legion of Merit	
71		Lawrence D. Nicholson	Major general	June 10, 2013	July 30, 2015	Later commanded III Marine Expeditionary Force; veteran of Iraq War and War in Afghanistan; two awards of Defense Superior Service Medal, Legion of Merit with Combat "V" and Purple Heart	
72		Daniel D. Yoo	Brigadier general	July 30, 2015	September 10, 2015	Later commanded Special Operations Command Pacific; veteran of War in Afghanistan; Legion of Merit and two awards of Bronze Star Medal	
73		Daniel J. O'Donohue	Major general	September 10, 2015	June 23, 2017	Veteran of Iraq War and War in Afghanistan; two awards of Defense Superior Service Medal, Legion of Merit with Combat "V" and Bronze Star Medal with Combat "V"	
74		Eric M. Smith	Major general	June 23, 2017	July 6, 2018	Veteran of Gulf War, Iraq War and War in Afghanistan; Defense Distinguished Service Medal, Legion of Merit, two awards of Bronze Star Medal with Combat "V" and Purple Heart	
75		Robert F. Castellvi	Major general	July 6, 2018	September 22, 2020	Veteran of War in Afghanistan; Defense Superior Service Medal, two awards of Legion of Merit, Bronze Star Medal with Combat "V"	
76		Roger B. Turner Jr.	Major general	September 22, 2020	July 8, 2022	Veteran of Iraq War and War in Afghanistan; Defense Superior Service Medal with “C,” two awards of Legion of Merit, two awards of the Bronze Star with Combat Distinguishing Device	
77		Benjamin T. Watson	Major general	July 8, 2022	July 2, 2024	Veteran of Iraq War and War in Afghanistan; Defense Superior Service Medal with “C,” Legion of Merit, Bronze Star Medal with Combat "V"	
78		Robert C. Fulford	Major general	July 2, 2024	November 26, 2024	Veteran of Iraq War; Defense Superior Service Medal, Legion of Merit, Bronze Star Medal with Combat "V"	
79		Thomas B. Savage	Major general	November 26, 2024	May 29, 2026	Defense Superior Service Medal, Legion of Merit, Bronze Star Medal with Combat "V"	
80		Andrew T. Priddy	Brigadier general	May 29, 2026	Incumbent		

== See also ==
- List of United States Marine Corps divisions
- List of 1st Marine Aircraft Wing Commanders
- List of 2nd Marine Division Commanders
- List of 3rd Marine Division Commanders
- List of Historically Important U.S. Marines
- List of United States Marine Corps aircraft wings
- List of active United States Marine Corps aircraft squadrons
