= List of historic members of the United States Marine Corps =

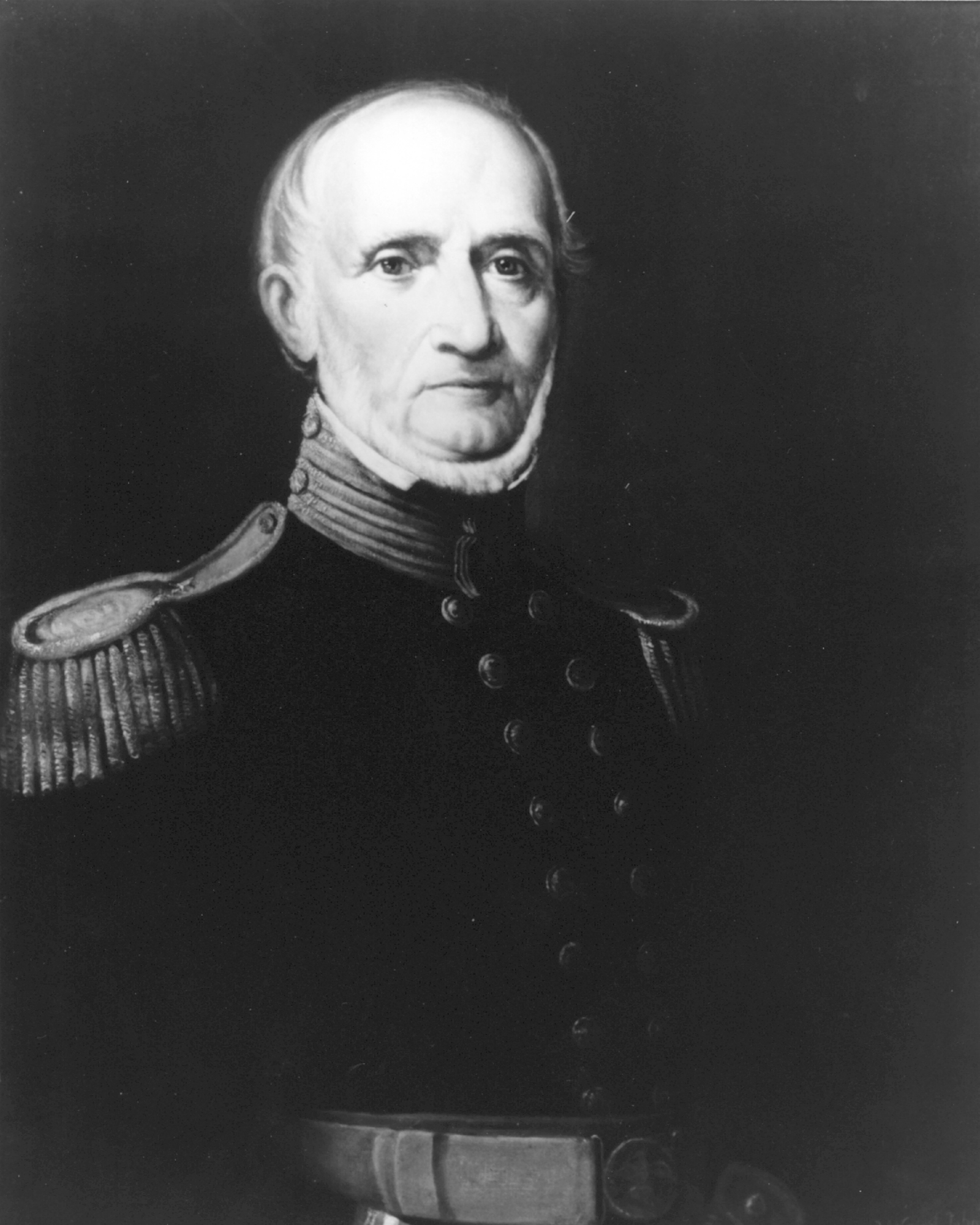
Archibald Henderson, longest-serving Commandant of the Marine Corps

The following is a list of the prominent names in U.S. Marine Corps lore—the people who make up what the Marines call "knowledge". Names in this list are notable for actions made as a Marine; individuals whose notability is unrelated to service in uniform can be found at List of United States Marines.

== Medal of Honor recipients ==
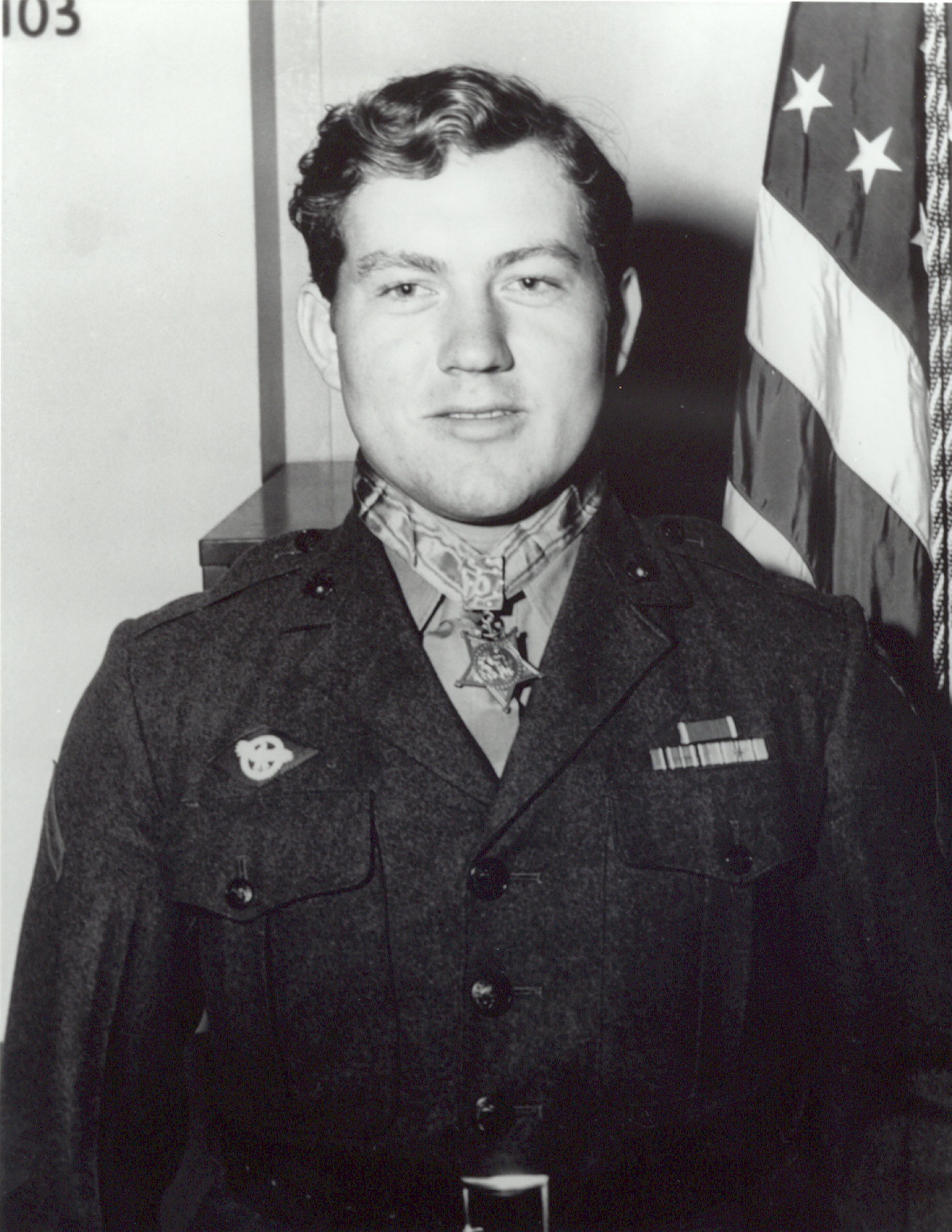
Jack Lucas, 17, youngest Medal of Honor recipient

- William Earl Barber – Marine Corps colonel who fought in Iwo Jima during World War II and was awarded the Medal of Honor for his actions in the Battle of Chosin Reservoir during the Korean War. Barber and his company of 220 men held off more than 1,400 Chinese soldiers during six days of fighting in North Korea, known as the last stand of Fox Company, only 82 US Marines walked away alive.
- John Basilone – only enlisted Marine Medal of Honor recipient to return to combat and be killed
- Gregory "Pappy" Boyington – commanded the "Black Sheep Squadron" (VMA-214) during WWII
- Smedley Butler – awarded two Medals of Honor for two different acts, outspoken critic of war profiteers, testified in Congress regarding a plot to overthrow the government
- Louis Cukela – awarded both Navy and Army Medals of Honor
- Daniel Daly – awarded two Medals of Honor for two different acts in two different conflicts
- Merritt A. Edson – commander of the 1st Marine Raider Battalion
- Joe Foss – leading fighter ace of the Marine Corps during World War II and the Guadalcanal campaign
- Allan J. Kellogg – platoon sergeant of Company G, 2nd Battalion, 5th Marines, 1st Marine Division, during the Vietnam War.
- Jacklyn H. Lucas – youngest Marine to receive the Medal of Honor
- John F. Mackie – first Marine awarded the Medal of Honor
- David M. Shoup – was a general of the United States Marine Corps who was awarded the Medal of Honor in World War II, served as the 22nd Commandant of the Marine Corps, and, after retiring, became one of the most prominent critics of the Vietnam War.
- France Silva – first Hispanic Marine to be awarded the Medal of Honor
- John Lucian Smith – flying ace in the Guadalcanal campaign
- Edward Sullivan – awarded the Medal of Honor for heroism during the Spanish–American War of 1898
- Louis H. Wilson Jr. – commanding officer of Company F, Second Battalion, Ninth Marines, Third Marine Division, in action against enemy Japanese forces at Fonte Hill, Guam, Marianas Islands

== Marine Corps firsts ==
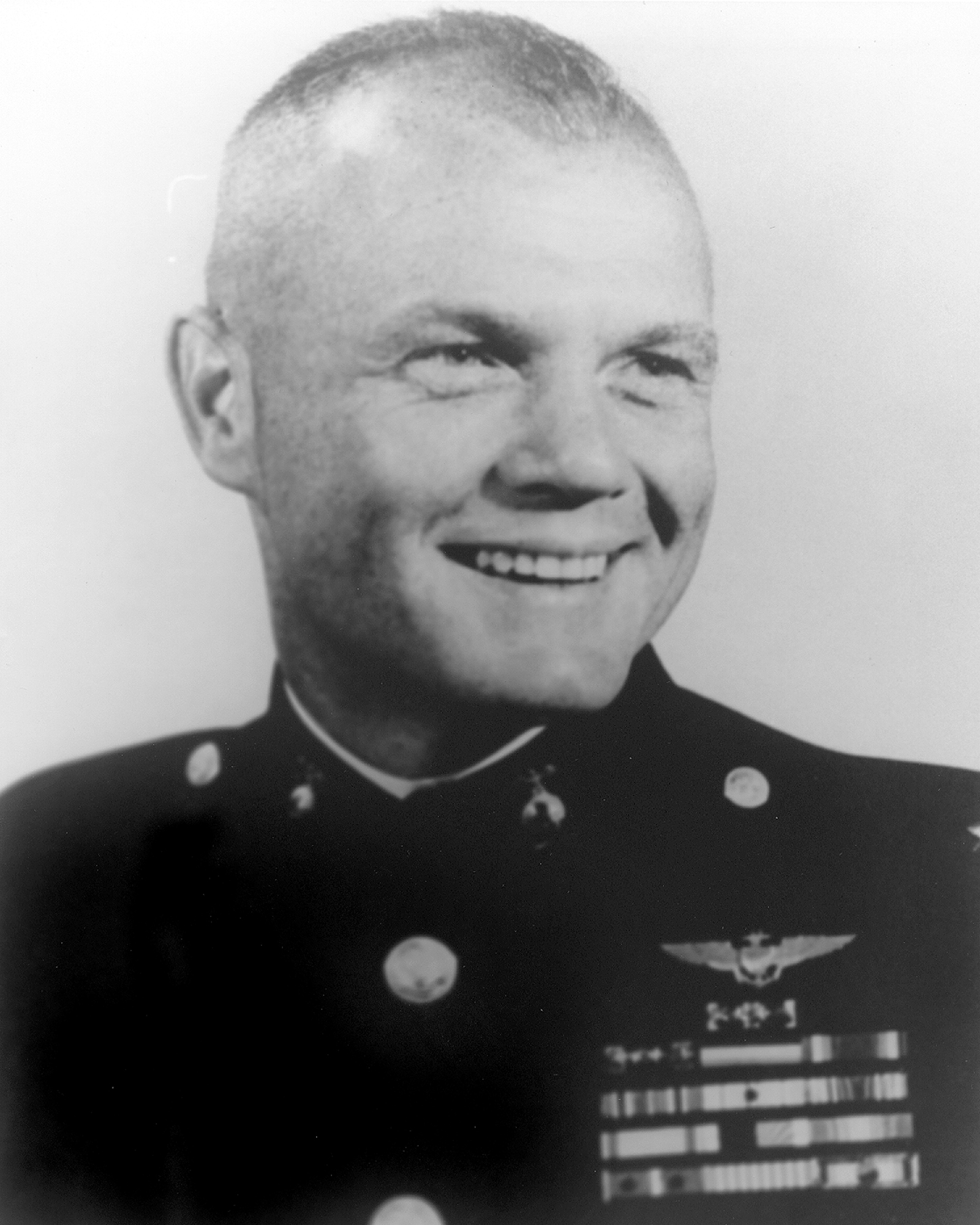
John Glenn, first Marine Corps astronaut

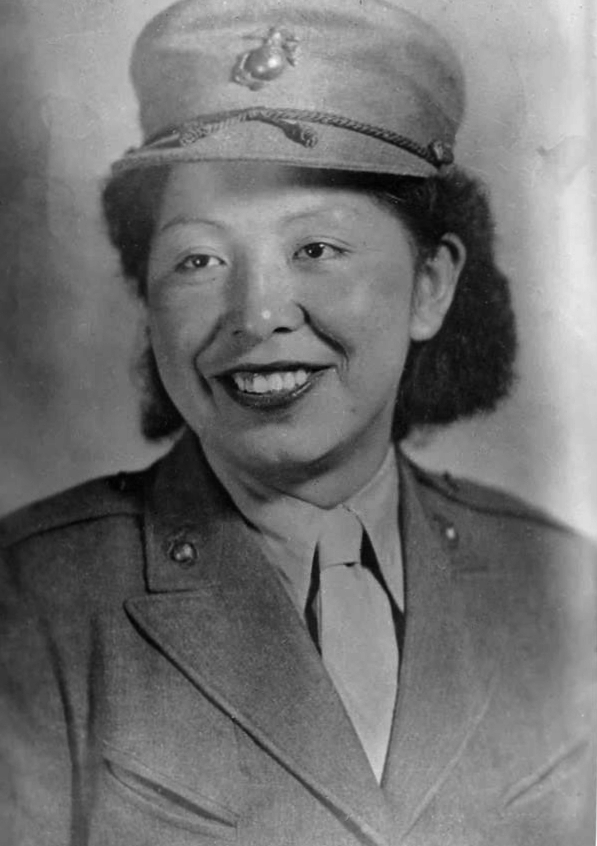
Minnie Spotted-Wolf, first Native American woman to enlist in the Marine Corps

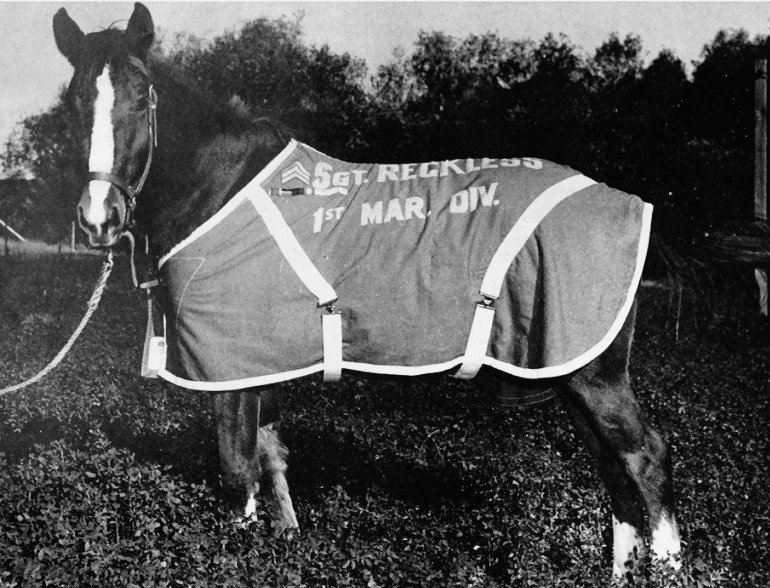
Staff Sergeant Reckless in retirement

- Vernice Armour – first female African-American combat pilot in United States military
- Bryan B. Battaglia – first Marine appointed Senior Enlisted Advisor to the Chairman of the Joint Chiefs of Staff
- Frederick C. Branch – first African-American Marine officer
- Marion Carl – first Marine ace (18.5 victories), member of the Cactus Air Force, first Marine helicopter pilot
- John L. Estrada – first Hispanic Sergeant Major of the Marine Corps
- John Glenn – first Marine astronaut, first American to orbit the Earth
- Annie Neal Graham – first African-American woman Marine
- Opha May Johnson – first woman Marine
- James L. Jones Sr. – commanded the Observer Group, the first amphibious reconnaissance unit in the United States; father of James L. Jones Jr., the 32nd Commandant of the Marine Corps
- Michael E. Langley - first African-American Marine to reach the rank of general
- Kurt Chew-Een Lee – first Chinese-American Marine officer. Led an infantry platoon at the Battle of Chosin Reservoir and was awarded the Navy Cross for his heroism.
- Alfred Masters – first African American Marine
- Dennis M. McCarthy – first reserve general officer to command an active duty Marine division
- Alford L. McMichael – first African American Marine to serve as Sergeant Major of the Marine Corps
- Samuel Nicholas – first Commandant of the Marine Corps
- Presley O'Bannon – first to raise the U.S. Flag over foreign soil as a result of combat, "Hero of Derna" which are the "shores of Tripoli" in the Marine hymn
- Peter Pace – first Marine to become the Chairman of the Joint Chiefs of Staff
- Frank E. Petersen – first African-American aviator Marine, first African-American Marine general, first African-American to command a fighter squadron, a fighter air group, an air wing and a major base.
- Staff Sergeant Reckless – first horse to hold an official rank in the United States Marines and U.S. military in general.
- Angela Salinas – first Hispanic female to obtain a general rank in the Marines
- Pedro del Valle – first Hispanic to reach the rank of lieutenant general, played an instrumental role in defeating Japanese forces during the Battle of Okinawa
- Minnie Spotted-Wolf – first enlisted Native American woman Marine

== Other prominent Marines ==
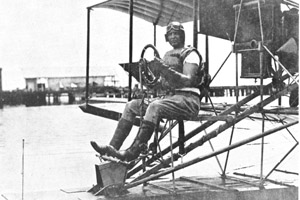
Alfred Cunningham, patron of Marine Corps aviation

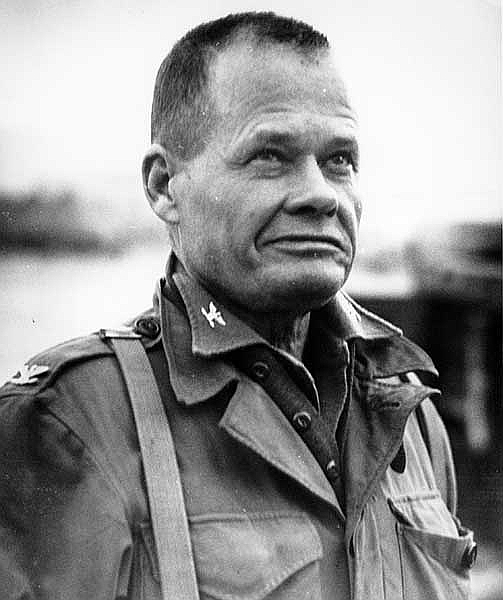
Chesty Puller, only Marine to receive 5 Navy Crosses

- Harlon Block – participant in raising the flag on Iwo Jima
- John F. Bolt – only Marine aviator to achieve the title of ace in both WWII and the Korean War; remains to this day the only Marine jet aircraft ace
- Evans Carlson – commanded the World War II Marine Raiders, also credited with introducing the term Gung ho into the Marine Corps
- Alfred Cunningham – patron of Marine Corps aviation, innovative thinker in introducing air support, helped create the Advanced Base Force
- Lou Diamond – "Mr. Leatherneck," namesake of the actor Lou Diamond Phillips
- Earl H. Ellis – conducted espionage missions in Micronesia that influenced the planning of the island-hopping campaigns of World War II
- Guy Gabaldon – captured (or persuaded to surrender) about 1,000 Japanese soldiers and numerous civilians during the Battle of Saipan
- Carlos Hathcock – renowned Marine sniper with 93 confirmed kills during the Vietnam War
- Ira Hayes – Native American flag raiser on Iwo Jima during World War II
- Archibald Henderson – "Grand old man of the Marine Corps," longest-serving Commandant of the Marine Corps (1820–1859)
- Albert L. Ireland – received nine Purple Hearts, the most of any Marine
- Harold Keller – participant in raising the flag on Iwo Jima
- Victor H. Krulak – developed new concepts in expeditionary warfare, such as use of Higgins landing craft and helicopters; father of Charles C. Krulak, 31st Commandant of the Marine Corps
- Robert Leckie – served with the 1st Marine Division during World War II; in later life an author of books including Helmet for My Pillow
- John A. Lejeune – 13th Commandant of the Marine Corps, Commanding General of the U.S. Army's 2nd Infantry Division, and author of the birthday message read aloud at every Marine Corps Birthday Ball ceremony
- James Mattis – American veteran and former government official who served as the 26th United States Secretary of Defense from January 2017 through December 2018
- Chuck Mawhinney – Marine sniper with the most confirmed kills, all occurring during the Vietnam War
- Lewis Burwell "Chesty" Puller – received five Navy Crosses and the Army Distinguished Service Cross
- John Ripley – highly decorated Marine, only living person (at the time) to be memorialized in the Naval Academy's museum, first Marine inducted into the Ranger hall of fame
- Lawson H. M. Sanderson – aviation pioneer, father of dive bombing technique
- Eugene Sledge – author of the 1981 memoir With the Old Breed: At Peleliu and Okinawa, which chronicled his combat experiences during World War II
- Franklin Sousley – participant in raising the flag on Iwo Jima
- Michael Strank – participant in raising the flag on Iwo Jima
- Harold Schultz – participant in raising the flag on Iwo Jima
- George O. Van Orden – brigadier general and "Father of Marine Snipers"
- Donald M. Weller – major general and pioneer of Naval gunfire support
- Greeley Wells – participant in raising the flag on Iwo Jima
- William J. Whaling – major general and highly decorated Marine, created the basics for Marine Scout and sniper Company and for Marine Recon
- Dion Williams – patron of naval and amphibious reconnaissance, hoisted the first American flag raised over Spanish soil in the Spanish–American War

== See also ==
- List of United States Marine Corps astronauts
- List of United States Marine Corps four-star generals
- List of Medal of Honor recipients
- List of 1st Marine Aircraft Wing Commanders
- List of 1st Marine Division Commanders
- List of 2nd Marine Division Commanders
- List of 3rd Marine Division Commanders

== Sources ==
- Dorr, Robert F. (2005). Marine Air – The History of the Flying Leathernecks in Words and Photos. Penguin Group. ISBN 0-425-20725-0.
