= Harvey C. Tschirgi =

United States Marine Corps general

Harvey Curtis Tschirgi
- Born: April 20, 1908; Grundy Center, Iowa, US
- Died: April 1, 2001 (aged 92) El Paso, Texas, US
- Buried: Arlington National Cemetery
- Allegiance: United States of America
- Branch: United States Navy; United States Marine Corps
- Service years: 1926–1928 (U.S. Navy); 1932–1961 (U.S. Marine Corps)
- Rank: Brigadier General
- Commands: 5th Marine Regiment; 1st Marine Division
- Conflicts: World War II: Battle of Peleliu; Battle of Okinawa; Chinese Civil War: Operation Beleaguer; Korean War
- Awards: Legion of Merit (2); Bronze Star w/ Combat "V"

Harvey Curtis Tschirgi (April 20, 1908 – April 1, 2001) was a United States Marine with the rank of brigadier general.

== Early life and military career ==
Harvey C. Tschirgi was born on April 20, 1908, in Grundy Center, Iowa. In 1925 he graduated from high school and in 1926 he enlisted in the United States Navy.

In 1928, he was enrolled in the United States Naval Academy at Annapolis, Maryland. Tschirgi played on the football team before graduating from the academy on June 2, 1932. Upon graduation, he was commissioned as a second lieutenant in the Marine Corps and subsequently attended the Basic School in Philadelphia, Pennsylvania.

In April 1934, Tschirgi was assigned to the USS Tennessee. In January 1935, he received orders to Shanghai, China, where he joined the 4th Marine Regiment. He was promoted to first lieutenant that August and returned to the United States in June 1937. In July 1938, he joined the 6th Marine Regiment in San Diego, California. He was promoted to captain two months later. From June 1939 to August 1940, Tschirgi was assigned to the Marine detachment at the New York World's Fair.

== World War II ==
In March 1941, he was given command of the Marine detachment aboard the USS North Carolina, and was promoted to major in May 1942.

From August to November 1942, he attended several infantry courses at Fort Benning Georgia. He was promoted to lieutenant colonel in March 1943. Tschirgi was assigned to the 1st Marine Division in July 1944, and took part in the battle of Peleliu from September to October, where he was awarded the Bronze Star.

He would later take part in the battle of Okinawa from April to June 1945, where he was awarded his first Legion of Merit. From September 1945 to June 1946, he took part in the occupation of Tientsin, China.

== Later career and life ==
In June 1949, Tschirgi was assigned to the Naval War College in Newport, Rhode Island. He was then promoted to colonel in August 1949. In October 1952, he was sent to Korea and was assigned to the 1st Marine Division in November, ultimately taking command of the Kimpo Provisional Regiment on December 1. Tschirgi took command of the 5th Marines from April 1953 until August 1953, when he left Korea. He was awarded his second Legion of Merit.

In November 1956, Tschirgi was promoted to brigadier general and became the assistant division commander of the 1st Marine Division. From January to February 1958, he was the acting commanding general of the 1st Marine Division. Brigadier General Tschirgi retired from the Marines on November 1, 1961.

Harvey C. Tschirgi died on April 1, 2001, in El Paso Texas. He was buried in Arlington National Cemetery in Arlington, Virginia.

== See also ==
- List of 1st Marine Division Commanders

Military offices
Preceded by David M. Shoup	Commanding General of the 1st Marine Division; January 3, 1958 – February 4, 1958	Succeeded by Edward W. Snedeker
Preceded by Lewis W. Walt	Commanding Officer of the 5th Marine Regiment; April 14, 1953 – August 1, 1953	Succeeded by Rathvon M. Tompkins
