= List of 2nd Marine Division commanders =

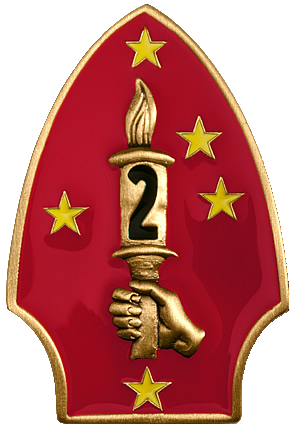
2d Marine Division Insignia

The 2d Marine Division is a Marine infantry division of the United States Marine Corps headquartered at Marine Corps Base Camp Lejeune, North Carolina. It is the ground combat element of the II Marine Expeditionary Force (II MEF).

Together with 1st Marine Division, it is the oldest and largest active duty division in the United States Marine Corps, representing a combat-ready force of more than 19,000 men and women. It is one of three active duty divisions in the Marine Corps today and is a multi-role, expeditionary ground combat force. It is nicknamed "The Silent Second".

The 2d Marine Division participated in World War II, Operation in Panama, Gulf War, Iraq War and War in Afghanistan.

During its history, three commanding generals became the Commandant of the Marine Corps (Randolph M. Pate, Alfred M. Gray Jr. and James L. Jones) and another three commanding generals became Assistant Commandant of the Marine Corps (Samuel Jaskilka, Kenneth McLennan and Richard I. Neal).

== Commanding generals ==
#	Picture	Name	Rank	Start	End	Notability	Ref
1		Clayton B. Vogel	Major general	February 1, 1941	December 7, 1941	"Father" Navajo code talker program; commanding general of I Marine Amphibious Corps and also commanded Marine Corps Recruit Depot Parris Island	
2		Charles F. B. Price	Major general	December 8, 1941	March 23, 1942	Commanded the Defense Forces, Samoan Group and Marine Corps Training and Replacement Command during World War II; Navy Distinguished Service Medal and Legion of Merit	
3		Joseph C. Fegan (Acting)	Brigadier general	March 24, 1942	March 31, 1942	Veteran of Banana Wars; First commanding general of Camp Pendleton; later commanded Department of the Pacific; father of Lieutenant general Joseph C. Fegan Jr.	
4		John Marston	Major general	April 1, 1942	April 30, 1943	Veteran of Banana Wars; later commanded Department of the Pacific and Camp Lejeune	
5		Julian C. Smith	Major general	May 1, 1943	April 10, 1944	Veteran of Banana Wars and Battle of Tarawa; later commanded Department of the Pacific and Marine Corps Recruit Depot Parris Island; Navy Cross and two awards of Navy Distinguished Service Medal	
6		Thomas E. Watson	Major general	April 11, 1944	June 22, 1945	Veteran of Banana Wars and Marianas Islands Campaign; later commanded Fleet Marine Force, Pacific and served as director of personnel; two awards of Navy Distinguished Service Medal	
7		LeRoy P. Hunt	Major general	June 23, 1945	July 9, 1946	Veteran of World War I, Banana Wars, Guadalcanal Campaign or Battle of Okinawa; later commanded Department of the Pacific or Fleet Marine Force, Atlantic; Navy Cross, Distinguished Service Cross, three awards of Silver Star, two awards of Legion of Merit, Bronze Star Medal, two awards of Purple Heart	
8		Gregon A. Williams (Acting)	Colonel	July 10, 1946	July 20, 1946	Veteran of Banana Wars, Battle of Okinawa and Korean War; later commanded Force Troops, Fleet Marine Force, Atlantic and served as Inspector General Marine Corps; Navy Cross, three awards of Legion of Merit, Bronze Star Medal with Combat "V"	
9		Thomas E. Watson	Major general	July 21, 1946	January 31, 1948	Veteran of Banana Wars and Marianas Islands Campaign; later commanded Fleet Marine Force, Pacific and served as director of personnel; two awards of Navy Distinguished Service Medal	
10		Franklin A. Hart	Major general	February 1, 1948	June 30, 1950	Veteran of Banana Wars, Dieppe Raid, Marianas Islands Campaign and Battle of Iwo Jima; later commanded Fleet Marine Force, Pacific and Marine Corps Recruit Depot Parris Island; Navy Cross, Legion of Merit with Combat "V", Bronze Star Medal with Combat "V"	
11		Ray A. Robinson	Major general	July 1, 1950	December 6, 1951	Veteran of Yangtze Patrol, Recapture of Guam and Battle of Iwo Jima; later commanded Fleet Marine Force, Atlantic and Camp Lejeune; Two awards of Legion of Merit with Combat "V", Bronze Star Medal	
12		Edwin A. Pollock	Major general	December 7, 1951	September 2, 1952	Veteran of Banana Wars, Guadalcanal Campaign, Battle of Cape Gloucester, Battle of Iwo Jima and Korean War; later commanded Fleet Marine Force, Atlantic and Fleet Marine Force, Pacific; Navy Cross, Army Distinguished Service Medal, Legion of Merit with Combat "V", Bronze Star Medal with Combat "V"	
13		Randolph M. Pate	Major general	September 3, 1952	May 29, 1953	Veteran of Guadalcanal Campaign, Battle of Iwo Jima and Korean War; The 21st Commandant of the Marine Corps, also commanded 1st Marine Division or Marine Corps Reserve; Army Distinguished Service Medal, two awards of Legion of Merit with Combat "V", Purple Heart	
14		Robert E. Hogaboom (Acting)	Brigadier general	May 30, 1953	June 23, 1953	Veteran of Banana Wars, Marianas Islands Campaign, Battle of Iwo Jima and Korean War; later served as Chief of Staff, HQMC; Three awards of Legion of Merit with Combat "V", Navy Commendation Medal	
15		George F. Good Jr.	Major general	June 24, 1953	July 1, 1954	Veteran of Banana Wars, Defense of Funafuti, Battle of Okinawa; later commanded Department of the Pacific or Camp Pendleton; Two awards of Legion of Merit with Combat "V"	
16		Lewis B. Puller	Major general	July 2, 1954	February 7, 1955	The most decorated Marine in American history; veteran of Banana Wars, Guadalcanal Campaign, Battle of Peleliu and Korean War; commanded Troop Training Unit Pacific at Coronado, California; Five awards of Navy Cross, Distinguished Service Cross, Silver Star, two awards of Legion of Merit with Combat "V", Bronze Star Medal with Combat "V", three awards of Air Medal, Purple Heart	
17		Edward W. Snedeker	Major general	February 8, 1955	July 1, 1955	Veteran of Banana Wars, Guadalcanal Campaign, Bougainville Campaign, Battle of Okinawa and Korean War; later commanded Marine Corps Schools, Quantico or 1st Marine Division; Navy Cross, Silver Star, three awards of Legion of Merit with Combat "V", Bronze Star Medal with Combat "V", two awards of Air Medal, Navy Commendation Medal with Combat "V"	
18		Reginald H. Ridgely Jr.	Major general	July 2, 1955	June 2, 1957	Veteran of Banana Wars, Philippines Campaign (Prisoner of War); later commanded Camp Pendleton; Two awards of Bronze Star Medal with Combat "V", Purple Heart	
19		Joseph C. Burger	Major general	June 3, 1957	October 24, 1959	Veteran of Yangtze Patrol, Guadalcanal Campaign and Korean War; commanded Fleet Marine Force, Atlantic or Marine Corps Recruit Depot Parris Island during Ribbon Creek incident; Navy Distinguished Service Medal, Bronze Star Medal with Combat "V", Navy Commendation Medal	
20		Odell M. Conoley (Acting)	Brigadier general	October 25, 1959	November 5, 1959	Veteran of Yangtze Patrol, Guadalcanal Campaign and New Britain Campaign; Navy Cross, Silver Star, Legion of Merit and Army Commendation Medal	
21		James P. Berkeley	Major general	November 6, 1959	November 3, 1961	Veteran of Yangtze Patrol, Battle of Iwo Jima and Korean War; commanded Fleet Marine Force, Atlantic or Camp Lejeune; Navy Distinguished Service Medal, Legion of Merit with Combat "V"	
22		Frederick L. Wieseman	Major general	November 4, 1961	June 23, 1963	Veteran of Guadalcanal Campaign, Bougainville Campaign, Recapture of Guam and Korean War; later commanded Marine Corps Schools, Quantico; Two awards of Navy Distinguished Service Medal, Legion of Merit with Combat "V", Bronze Star Medal with Combat "V"	
23		Rathvon M. Tompkins	Brigadier general (Acting)	June 24, 1963	September 26, 1963	Veteran of Guadalcanal Campaign, Battle of Tarawa, Battle of Saipan, Korean War or Battle of Khe Sanh; later commanded 3rd Marine Division or Camp Lejeune; Navy Cross, two awards of Navy Distinguished Service Medal, Silver Star, two awards of Legion of Merit with Combat "V", two awards of Bronze Star Medal with Combat "V"	
24		William J. Van Ryzin	Major general	September 27, 1963	April 11, 1965	Veteran of World War II and Vietnam War; later served as Chief of Staff, Headquarters Marine Corps; two awards of Navy Distinguished Service Medal, two awards of Legion of Merit with Combat "V", Bronze Star Medal with Combat "V"	
25		Ormond R. Simpson	Major general	April 12, 1965	November 21, 1967	Veteran of World War II and Vietnam War; later served as Chief of Staff, Headquarters Marine Corps; two awards of Navy Distinguished Service Medal, four awards of Legion of Merit, Bronze Star Medal, Navy Commendation Medal	
26		Edwin B. Wheeler	Major general	November 22, 1967	May 18, 1969	Marine Raider, veteran of World War II, Korean War and Vietnam War; later commanded 1st Marine Division; Navy Distinguished Service Medal, Silver Star, five awards of Legion of Merit	
27		Michael P. Ryan	Major general	May 19, 1969	June 4, 1971	Veteran of Guadalcanal Campaign, Battle of Tarawa and Vietnam War; Also served as director of Marine Corps Reserve; Navy Cross, Legion of Merit with Combat "V"	
28		Robert D. Bohn	Major general	June 5, 1971	September 28, 1971	Veteran of World War II, Korean War and Vietnam War; later commanded Camp Lejeune; two awards of Silver Star, two awards of Legion of Merit with Combat "V", Army Commendation Medal, Navy Commendation Medal with Combat "V" and two awards of Purple Hearts	
29		Fred E. Haynes Jr.	Major general	September 29, 1971	January 9, 1973	Veteran of Battle of Iwo Jima, Korean War and Vietnam War; later commanded Camp Lejeune; four awards of Legion of Merit with Combat "V", Bronze Star Medal with Combat "V"	
30		Arthur J. Poillon (Acting)	Brigadier general	January 10, 1973	July 1, 1973	Veteran of World War II, Korean War and Vietnam War; later commanded Camp Lejeune; two awards of Legion of Merit with Combat "V", Army Commendation Medal	
31		Samuel Jaskilka	Major general	July 2, 1973	December 19, 1973	Veteran of World War II, Korean War and Vietnam War; Retired as General and later served as Assistant Commandant of the Marine Corps; Navy Distinguished Service Medal, two awards of Silver Star, Legion of Merit, Bronze Star Medal with Combat "V", two awards of Joint Service Commendation Medal	
32		William H. Lanagan Jr. (Acting)	Brigadier general	December 20, 1973	May 15, 1974	Veteran of World War II, Korean War and Vietnam War; later served as assistant commander of 2nd Division; Navy Distinguished Service Medal, two awards of Legion of Merit with Combat "V"	
33		William G. Joslyn	Major general	May 16, 1974	June 30, 1976	Veteran of World War II, Korean War and Vietnam War; Also commanded Marine Corps Base 29 Palms; three awards of Legion of Merit with Combat "V", two awards of Bronze Star Medal with Combat "V", Navy Commendation Medal with Combat "V" and Purple Heart	
34		Kenneth McLennan	Major general	July 1, 1976	May 17, 1978	Veteran of Korean War and Vietnam War; later served as Assistant Commandant of the Marine Corps; Navy Distinguished Service Medal, Legion of Merit with Combat "V", Bronze Star Medal with Combat "V"	
35		Edward J. Bronars	Major general	May 18, 1978	June 27, 1979	Veteran of Korean War and Vietnam War; later served as deputy chief of staff for manpower; Navy Distinguished Service Medal, Silver Star, two awards of Legion of Merit with Combat "V", two awards of Bronze Star Medal with Combat "V" and two awards of Air Medal	
36		David M. Twomey	Major general	June 28, 1979	June 4, 1981	Veteran of Korean War and Vietnam War; later served as deputy chief of staff for manpower; Navy Distinguished Service Medal, Navy and Marine Corps Medal, Legion of Merit, two awards of Bronze Star Medal with Combat "V" and two awards of Air Medal	
37		Alfred M. Gray Jr.	Major general	June 5, 1981	August 28, 1984	Veteran of Korean War and Vietnam War; Retired as General and later served as the 29th Commandant of the Marine Corps from 1987–91; two awards of Defense Distinguished Service Medal, two awards of Navy Distinguished Service Medal, Coast Guard Distinguished Service Medal, Silver Star, two awards of Legion of Merit with Combat "V", four awards of Bronze Star Medal with Combat "V" and three awards of Purple Heart	
38		Dennis J. Murphy	Major general	August 29, 1984	October 29, 1987	Veteran of Vietnam War; previously served as deputy commander, Fleet Marine Force Pacific; Navy Distinguished Service Medal, Defense Superior Service Medal, two awards of Legion of Merit with Combat "V"	
39		Orlo K. Steele	Major general	October 30, 1987	September 26, 1989	Veteran of Vietnam War; later served as Inspector of the Marine Corps; Navy Distinguished Service Medal, Bronze Star Medal with Combat "V"	
40		William M. Keys	Major general	September 27, 1989	June 24, 1991	Veteran of Vietnam War and Gulf War; later served as director, Personnel Management Division, Manpower and Reserve Affairs Department at Headquarters Marine Corps; Navy Cross, Defense Distinguished Service Medal, two awards of Navy Distinguished Service Medal, Silver Star, Legion of Merit with Combat "V", Bronze Star Medal with Combat "V"	
41		Paul Van Riper	Major general	June 25, 1991	April 3, 1993	Veteran of Vietnam War and Gulf War; later served as commanding general of Marine Corps Combat Development Command at Quantico; Navy Distinguished Service Medal, two awards of Silver Star, Legion of Merit, Bronze Star Medal with Combat "V", Purple Heart	
42		Richard I. Neal	Major general	April 4, 1993	July 28, 1994	Veteran of Vietnam War and Gulf War; Retired as General and later served as Assistant Commandant of the Marine Corps from 1996 to 1998; Defense Distinguished Service Medal, two awards of Silver Star, two awards of Defense Superior Service Medal, Bronze Star Medal with Combat "V", Purple Heart	
43		James L. Jones	Major general	July 29, 1994	June 23, 1995	Veteran of Vietnam War and Gulf War; Retired as General and later served as the 32nd Commandant of the Marine Corps from 1999 to 2003; four awards of Defense Distinguished Service Medal, Silver Star, five awards of Legion of Merit, Bronze Star Medal with Combat "V"	
44		Lawrence H. Livingston	Major general	June 24, 1995	July 24, 1997	Veteran of Vietnam War and Gulf War; Previously served as commanding general of Camp Lejeune; Navy Cross, Defense Distinguished Service Medal, Silver Star, two awards of Legion of Merit, four awards of Bronze Star Medal with Combat "V", five awards of Purple Heart	
45		Emil R. Bedard	Major general	July 25, 1997	June 29, 1999	Veteran of Vietnam War and Gulf War; later served as deputy commandant for plans, policies, and operations at Headquarters Marine Corps; Defense Superior Service Medal, two awards of Legion of Merit, Bronze Star Medal with Combat "V"	
46		Robert R. Blackman Jr.	Major general	June 30, 1999	July 30, 2001	Veteran of Vietnam War, Gulf War and Iraq War; later served as III Marine Expeditionary Force; two awards of Defense Superior Service Medal, two awards of Legion of Merit	
47		John F. Sattler	Major general	July 31, 2001	June 30, 2003	Veteran of Vietnam War and Iraq War; later served as director for strategic plans and policy, Joint Staff; Defense Distinguished Service Medal, Defense Superior Service Medal, two awards of Legion of Merit	
48		Stephen T. Johnson	Major general	July 1, 2003	November 9, 2004	Veteran of Iraq War; later served as commander of II Marine Expeditionary Force; Defense Superior Service Medal, Legion of Merit	
49		Richard A. Huck	Major general	November 10, 2004	June 16, 2006	Veteran of Iraq War; later served as commander of II Marine Expeditionary Force; two awards of Defense Superior Service Medal, two awards of Legion of Merit	
50		Walter E. Gaskin	Major general	June 16, 2006	June 20, 2008	Veteran of Kosovo mission; Also served as deputy chairman, NATO Military Committee, Brussels, Belgium; Defense Distinguished Service Medal, two awards of Defense Superior Service Medal, two awards of Legion of Merit, Bronze Star Medal with Combat "V"	
51		Richard T. Tryon	Major general	June 20, 2008	July 30, 2010	Veteran of Gulf War and Kosovo mission; later served as deputy commandant for plans, policies and operations; two awards of Defense Superior Service Medal, two awards of Legion of Merit	
52		John A. Toolan	Major general	August 1, 2010	March 1, 2012	Veteran of Gulf War and War in Afghanistan; later served as deputy commandant for plans, policies and operations; two awards of Defense Superior Service Medal, three awards of Legion of Merit	
53		James W. Lukeman	Major general	March 2, 2012	August 7, 2014	Veteran of Iraq War; later served as commanding general, Training and Education Command; two awards of Defense Superior Service Medal, three awards of Legion of Merit	
54		Brian Beaudreault	Major general	August 8, 2014	June 16, 2016	Veteran of Iraq War; later served as deputy commandant plans, policies, and operations; two awards of Defense Superior Service Medal, Legion of Merit, Bronze Star Medal	
55		John K. Love	Major general	June 17, 2016	August 1, 2018	Veteran of Iraq War; Previously served as the Chief of Staff, Naval Striking and Support Forces NATO in Naples, Italy; two awards of Defense Superior Service Medal, two awards of Legion of Merit, Bronze Star Medal	
56		David J. Furness	Major general	August 2, 2018	August 5, 2020	Veteran of Iraq War; Previously served as the Commanding General, Combined Joint Task Force – Horn of Africa at Camp Lemonnier, Djibouti; Defense Superior Service Medal, two awards of Legion of Merit, two awards of Bronze Star Medal	
57		Francis L. Donovan	Major general	August 6, 2020	August 19, 2022	Previously Assistant Commanding General, Joint Special Operations Command	
58		Calvert L. Worth Jr.	Major general	August 19, 2022	June 14, 2024		
59		David L. Odom	Major general	June 14, 2024	May 22, 2025		
60		Farrell J. Sullivan	Major general	May 22, 2025	Incumbent		

== See also ==
- List of United States Marine Corps divisions
- List of 1st Marine Division Commanders
- List of 3rd Marine Division Commanders
- List of 1st Marine Aircraft Wing Commanders
- List of Historically Important U.S. Marines
- List of United States Marine Corps aircraft wings
- List of active United States Marine Corps aircraft squadrons
