= Frederick L. Wieseman =

U.S. Marine Corps Lieutenant General

Frederick Leonard Wieseman
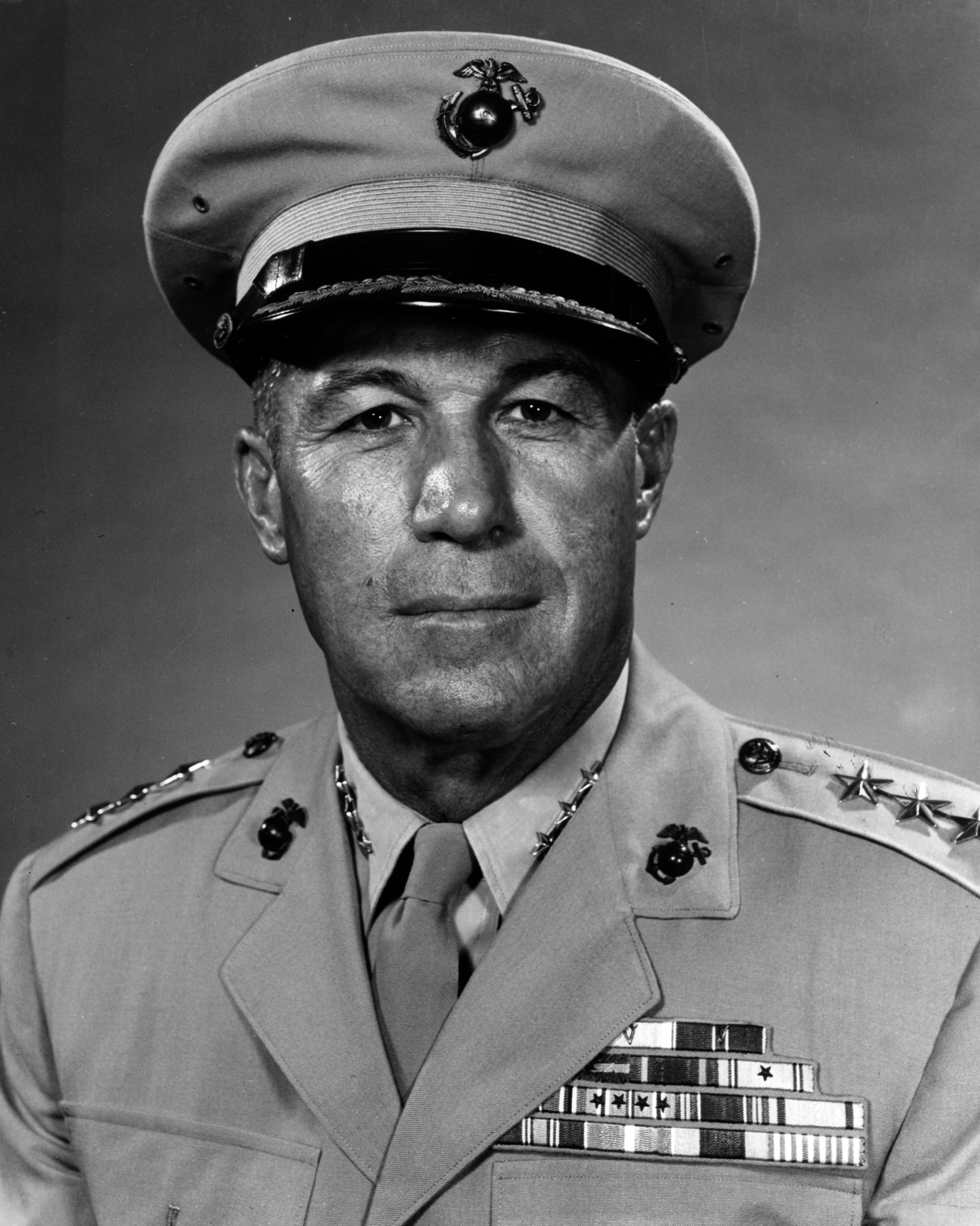
- LTG Frederick L. Wieseman, USMC
- Born: March 16, 1908; Milwaukee, Wisconsin, US
- Died: August 15, 1994 (aged 86); Annapolis, Maryland, US
- Burial place: Arlington National Cemetery
- Military career
- Allegiance: United States of America
- Branch: United States Marine Corps
- Service years: 1925–1967; 1969-1970
- Rank: Lieutenant general
- Nickname: "Fred"
- Service number: 0-4659
- Commands: Marine Corps Schools, Quantico; 2nd Marine Division; 1st Marine Brigade; 3rd Marine Regiment
- Conflicts: Yangtze Patrol; World War II: Battle of Guadalcanal; Bougainville Campaign; Recapture of Guam; Chinese Civil War; Korean War
- Awards: Distinguished Service Medal (2); Legion of Merit; Bronze Star Medal

Frederick Leonard Wieseman (March 16, 1908 – August 15, 1994) was a highly decorated officer of the United States Marine Corps with the rank of lieutenant general. He was a veteran of the Pacific War and later served as commandant of the Marine Corps Schools, Quantico in 1963–1966.

== Early career ==
Frederick L. Wieseman was born on March 16, 1908, in Milwaukee, Wisconsin, and his family later moved to Palmyra, Wisconsin, where he attended the high school. He graduated in summer of 1925 and subsequently enlisted the Marine Corps as private on August 10 of that year. Wieseman took part in the expeditionary duty in China within Yangtze Patrol, Philippines and Guam and rose to the NCO's rank.

He received appointment to the United States Naval Academy at Annapolis, Maryland, in July 1927 and spent next four years with studies there. During his time at the academy, Wieseman was active in football and basketball teams. He graduated on June 4, 1931, with a bachelor's degree and was commissioned second lieutenant in the Marine Corps on the same date.

As any other "fresh" marine officer, Wieseman was sent to the Basic School at Philadelphia Navy Yard for his officers' training. After graduation in spring 1932, he was attached to the Marine Corps rifle and pistol team at Marine Barracks Quantico, Virginia, and served there until September of that year, when he was transferred to the Marine Barracks Parris Island, South Carolina. While at Parris Island, Wieseman was a member of the Marine football team and later coached the Parris Island basketball team for two years.

He left Parris Island in April 1934 in order to join the Marine detachment aboard the heavy cruiser USS Minneapolis as newly promoted first lieutenant. Wieseman sailed to European waters for the shakedown cruise and later to San Diego via the Panama Canal. He then left Minneapolis in June 1935 and was attached again to the Marine Corps rifle and pistol team at Marine Barracks Quantico, Virginia. Wieseman also served as assistant coach of the Quantico Marines Devil Dogs football in seasons 1935 and 1936.

Wieseman departed Quantico in February 1937 in order to be appointed commanding officer of the Marine detachment aboard the newly commissioned aircraft carrier USS Yorktown. He took part in the initial training of that vessel in Hampton Roads, Virginia, and also participated in the shakedown cruise to the Caribbean. Wieseman was also promoted to the rank of captain in July 1938.

== World War II ==
In June 1939, Wieseman was ordered to the Marine Corps Schools, Quantico, where he attended Junior Course at the Amphibious Warfare School. Upon the graduation in May 1940, he began his third tour of duty with the Marine Corps rifle and pistol team at Quantico.

With the subsequent expansion of the Marine Corps, Captain Wieseman was ordered to Guantánamo Bay, Cuba, and appointed company commander within the 7th Marine Regiment, 1st Marine Division. The 1st Marine Division later sailed back to the United States, and 7th Marines were detached from the division in March 1942 in order to form the 3rd Marine Brigade at Camp Lejeune, North Carolina. Wieseman then sailed with the 3rd Marine Brigade to the Pacific area and took part in the defense of Samoa against Japanese threat. He was promoted to the rank of major in May 1942.

Wieseman was then appointed regimental supply officer of the 7th Marines under Colonel Amor L. Sims and took part in the Guadalcanal Campaign from September 1942 to January 1943. He subsequently served as liaison officer for the 1st Marine Division at general headquarters of Southwest Pacific Area under General Douglas MacArthur, before he was appointed supply officer of I Marine Amphibious Corps under Lieutenant General Alexander Vandegrift in August 1943. Wieseman was promoted to the rank of lieutenant colonel in March 1943.

The I Marine Amphibious Corps took part in the Bougainville Campaign in New Guinea in November 1943, and Wieseman was responsible for the coordination of logistics for all corps units. He distinguished himself in this capacity and received the Bronze Star Medal with Combat "V".

He served in the same capacity during the Recapture of Guam in July 1944 and was relieved by Lt. Colonel Francis B. Loomis Jr. at the beginning of August of that year. Wieseman received the Legion of Merit with Combat "V" for his service with I Marine Amphibious Corps and subsequently was ordered stateside.

Following a brief reunion with family, Wieseman was transferred to Washington, D.C., and attached to the Division of Plans and Policies at Headquarters Marine Corps under Brigadier General Gerald C. Thomas. He remained in this capacity until the end of November 1946.

== Later career ==
Wieseman was ordered back to the Pacific area in December 1946 and appointed executive officer of 7th Service Regiment. His regiment consisted of engineer company, signal company, military police company, ordnance company, supply company, transport company and several Marine ammo companies. He was subsequently ordered to China and took part in the combats against communists guerillas during Civil war as commanding officer of 3rd Marine Regiment. During this tenure he was promoted to the rank of colonel in July 1948. Wieseman was then relieved by Walfried M. Fromhold on August 17, 1948, and transferred to the staff of Commander, Naval Forces Western Pacific, under Vice Admiral Oscar C. Badger.

In this capacity, Wieseman took part in the successful negotiations with Communists for the release of Marine plane crew shot down and held prisoner by them in Shantung Province. For his service in China, he was decorated with the Chinese Order of the Cloud and Banner, 4th Class by the Government of China.

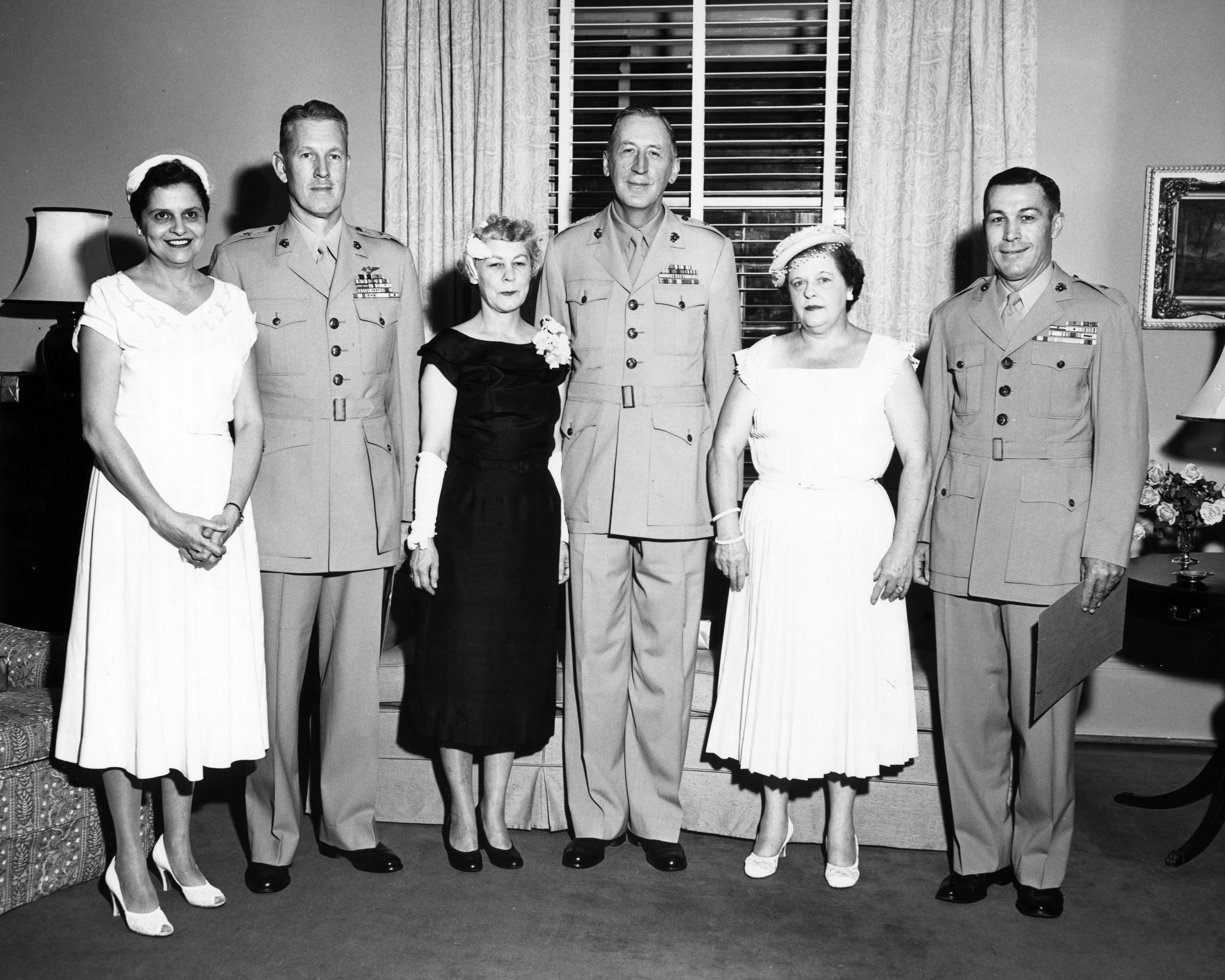
Three newly promoted Brigadier generals: Richard C. Mangrum, Ralph B. DeWitt, and Wieseman with their wives

Colonel Wieseman was transferred back to the United States in October 1948 and attached to the staff of Landing Force Training Unit, Amphibious Training Command, Atlantic Fleet at Little Creek, Virginia, and served under Brigadier General Robert H. Pepper. Wieseman was ordered for the instruction to Joint Forces Staff College in February 1949, and, following the graduation in July of that year, he was appointed chief of the logistics section, Marine Corps Educational Center, Quantico.

He was transferred to Okinawa, Japan, in July 1952 and appointed chief of staff of the 3rd Marine Division under his old superior from Little Creek Base, Major General Pepper. Wieseman took part with his division in the several amphibious exercises in Japan, and the 3rd Division later served as defense force of the Far Eastern area.

When General Pepper was given another command in May 1954 and Wieseman returned to the United States, his new assignment was with Advanced Research Group at Quantico, Virginia. This group was tasked with the development of the recommendations on how the MAGTF should evolve structurally to meet the challenges of atomic warfare and new technologies such as helicopters and jet aircraft.

Wieseman was transferred to Washington, D.C., in July 1955 and appointed assistant fiscal director at Headquarters Marine Corps. He was promoted to the rank of brigadier general in July 1956 and appointed fiscal director, the capacity he served in until April 1959.

Upon the completion of the tour of duty at Headquarters Marine Corps, Wieseman was transferred to Kāneʻohe Bay, Hawaii, and assumed duties as commanding general, 1st Marine Brigade. While there, he was promoted to the rank of major general in November 1959 and succeeded by Brigadier General Richard G. Weede in order to assume duties as deputy chief of staff for plans (operations deputy), Headquarters Marine Corps.

Major General Wieseman assumed duties at Camp Lejeune as commanding general of the 2nd Marine Division at the beginning of November 1961 and subsequently supervised the deployment of his division to Guantánamo Bay, Cuba, during the Cuban Missile Crisis in October 1962. He remained in the Caribbean until early December of that year and subsequently served with his division at Camp Lejeune until June 1963. During his deployment to Cuba, the 2nd Division demonstrated its ability to respond to short-notice embarkation orders with speed and efficiency. General Wiesman later received Brazilian Order of Military Merit for his service in the Caribbean.

Wieseman was promoted to the rank of lieutenant general on July 1, 1963, and was appointed commandant of the Marine Corps Schools, Quantico. In this capacity, he was responsible for the training and education at The Basic School, Officer Candidates School, Amphibious Warfare School and other facilities there and also Marine Corps Base Quantico itself.

He served in this capacity until June 30, 1966, when was relieved by Lieutenant General James M. Masters. Wieseman was also decorated with Navy Distinguished Service Medal for his "... demonstrating dynamic leadership, initiative and professional competence during this Period".

However, he did not remain in retirement for long, and was recalled to active duty in late of 1966 for service with Secretary of the Navy's Board of Decorations and Medals. Wieseman then retired for a second time during 1967, but was recalled to active service again in March 1969 for service as the senior Marine Corps representative and coordinator of Task Force Bravo to the Department of Defense, Joint Logistics Review Board.

== Retirement ==
Wieseman retired for good in June 1970 and received his second Navy Distinguished Service Medal for his service with Department of Defense. He settled in Triangle, Virginia, with his first wife, Dorothy Estella Bateman, and, following the death of his wife in 1973, he moved to Annapolis, Maryland. Wieseman married again in 1974 to Julia May Williams Cooper and lived in Ginger Cove retirement community. He was made a member of the Military Order of the Carabao in 1977.

He died of Parkinson’s disease on August 15, 1994, in Annapolis and is buried at Arlington National Cemetery, Virginia.

== Decorations ==
A complete list of the general's medals and decorations include:

1st Row	Navy Distinguished Service Medal with one 5/16" Gold Star		Legion of Merit with Combat "V"	Bronze Star Medal with Combat "V"
2nd Row	Navy Presidential Unit Citation with one star	Yangtze Service Medal	American Defense Service Medal with Base Clasp	American Campaign Medal
3rd Row	Asiatic-Pacific Campaign Medal with four 3/16 inch service stars	World War II Victory Medal	China Service Medal	National Defense Service Medal with one star
4th Row	Korean Service Medal	Brazilian Order of Military Merit, Commander	Order of the Cloud and Banner, 4th Class (Republic of China)	United Nations Korea Medal

Military offices
Preceded by Edward W. Snedeker	Commandant of the Marine Corps Schools, Quantico; July 1, 1963 - June 30, 1966	Succeeded by James M. Masters Sr.
Preceded by James P. Berkeley	Commanding General of the 2nd Marine Division; November 4, 1961 – June 23, 1963	Succeeded by Rathvon M. Tompkins

== See also ==
- Cuban Missile Crisis
- 2nd Marine Division
- List of 2nd Marine Division Commanders
