= Annie Neal Graham =

Annie Neal Graham (1929–2002) was the first African-American female to enlist in the United States Marine Corps. She enlisted on 8 September 1949 and served until 1952. In a letter written during her service, Graham stated that her duty station was MC. Headquarters Washington, D.C. There she served in several positions including the personnel department, publications department, and special borders.

== Recognition ==
Graham has since been honored in many ways. On November 10, 1984, Graham and Chief Warrant Officer Annie L. Grimes, the first black woman Marine officer, were guests of honor at the Montford Point Marine Association (MPMA) Marine Corps birthday ball.

In a United States Marine Corps National Black History Month observance, Graham was honored as one of many black female marines "who blazed new trails in the traditions of American public service."

On January 28, 2021, a video essay narrated by her daughter, Stephanie Gilliard-Sheard presented a letter written by Graham about her bootcamp and active-duty experiences.
