= Annie L. Grimes =

Former United States Marine Corps Officer

Annie Laurie Grimes (December 6, 1925 - November 24, 2019) was the first African American female United States Marine Corps Officer, and the first black female officer to retire after a full 20-year career. Grimes was born in Hickory Withe, Tennessee to parents Horace Karr Grimes and Ida Love White Grimes and a graduate of Fayette County High School.

Grimes enlisted in the Marines in Chicago and went to boot camp in February 1950, becoming the third black woman to enlist in the United States Marine Corps. In 1968 she became a Warrant Officer. She was active with the Montford Point Marine Association (MPMA) and, in 1999, was inducted into the Montford Point Marine Association Hall of Fame. On November 24, 2019, she died at St. Francis Hospital at the age of 93.
