= John Admire =

U.S. Marine major general

John H. Admire
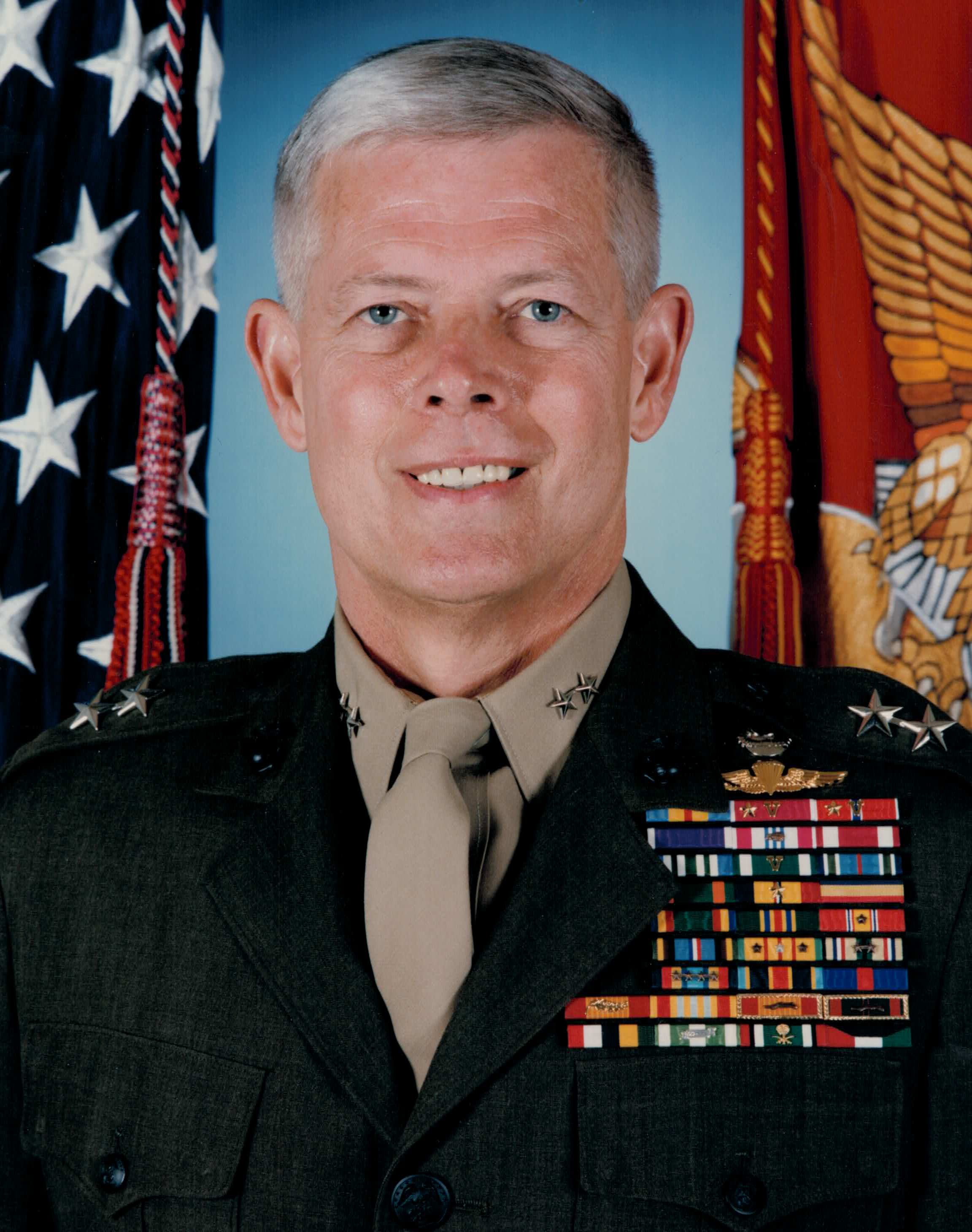
- Military career
- Allegiance: United States of America
- Branch: United States Marine Corps
- Service years: 1967-1998
- Rank: Major General
- Commands: 1st Marine Division
- Conflicts: Operation Desert Storm; Vietnam War
- Awards: Legion of Merit; Bronze Star Medal

John H. Admire is a retired U.S. Marine major general. Admire is a decorated veteran of Vietnam War and previously served as commanding general of 1st Marine Division.

== Marine career ==
Admire was commissioned in the United States Marine Corps as a second lieutenant after graduation from University of Oklahoma in 1967. He graduated from The Basic School at Marine Corps Base Quantico and served as Infantry Platoon Leader in Republic of Vietnam with 3rd Battalion, 3rd Marines. He later became an Infantry Battalion Advisor to the Vietnamese Marine Corps. He served as company commander in 2nd Marine Division. Colonel Admire served as commanding officer of 3rd Marine Regiment/ Task Force Taro during Operation Desert Shield/Desert Storm.

His staff assignments include Marine detachment, Guantanamo Bay Naval Base, Cuba; Training Officer for the 1st Marine Division; Marine Corps Legislative Liaison to the United States Congress; Headquarters Marine Corps, Washington, D.C.; Senior White House Military Aide for President Jimmy Carter; branch chief for the Operations Directorate at the United States European Command Headquarters in Germany; and Vice Director for Strategic Plans and Policy Joint Staff at the Pentagon, in Washington, D.C. Upon promotion to major general, Admire served as Commanding General, 1st Marine Division. Admire retired after 33 years of service in 1998. Author: Darker Than Dark, a story of the Vietnam War and four young Marines, 2015.

== Awards and decorations ==
U.S. military decorations
Defense Distinguished Service Medal
Legion of Merit with Combat Distinguishing Device and gold award star
Bronze Star Medal with Combat Distinguishing Device and gold award star
Purple Heart
Defense Meritorious Service Medal with oak leaf cluster
Meritorious Service Medal
Joint Service Commendation Medal
Navy and Marine Corps Commendation Medal with Combat Distinguishing Device
Joint Service Achievement Medal
Navy and Marine Corps Achievement Medal
Combat Action Ribbon with gold award star
U.S. Unit Awards
Presidential Unit Citation
Navy Unit Commendation
Navy Meritorious Unit Commendation
U.S. Service (Campaign) Medals and Service and Training Ribbons
National Defense Service Medal with bronze service star
Armed Forces Expeditionary Medal
Vietnam Service Medal
Southwest Asia Service Medal with two bronze campaign stars
Sea Service Deployment Ribbon with four bronze service stars
Overseas Service Ribbon
Recruiting Service Ribbon
Vietnam Armed Forces Honor Medal ribbon - Second Class
Vietnam Gallantry Cross
Vietnam Civil Actions Medal
Inter-American Defense Board Medal
Vietnam Campaign Medal
Kuwait Liberation Medal (Saudi Arabia)
Kuwait Liberation Medal (Kuwait)

U.S. badges, patches and tabs
Scuba Diver Badge
Navy and Marine Corps Parachutist Insignia
Rifle Expert Badge
Pistol Expert Badge
