= Ann Graham =

Ann or Anne Graham may refer to:

- Ann Graham (camogie), played in All-Ireland Senior Club Camogie Championship 1966
- Ann Graham (musician) in Alabama Jazz Hall of Fame
- Ann Carver Graham, character in Ann Carver's Profession
- Ann Graham (artist), involved in Construction in Process
- Anne Graham Lotz (born 1948), née Anne Graham, Christian evangelist
- Anne P. Graham, American politician

== See also ==
- Annie Graham (disambiguation)
- Anne Grahame Johnstone, children's book illustrator
