= James F. Moriarty (USMC) =

United States Marine Corps general

James Frederick Moriarty
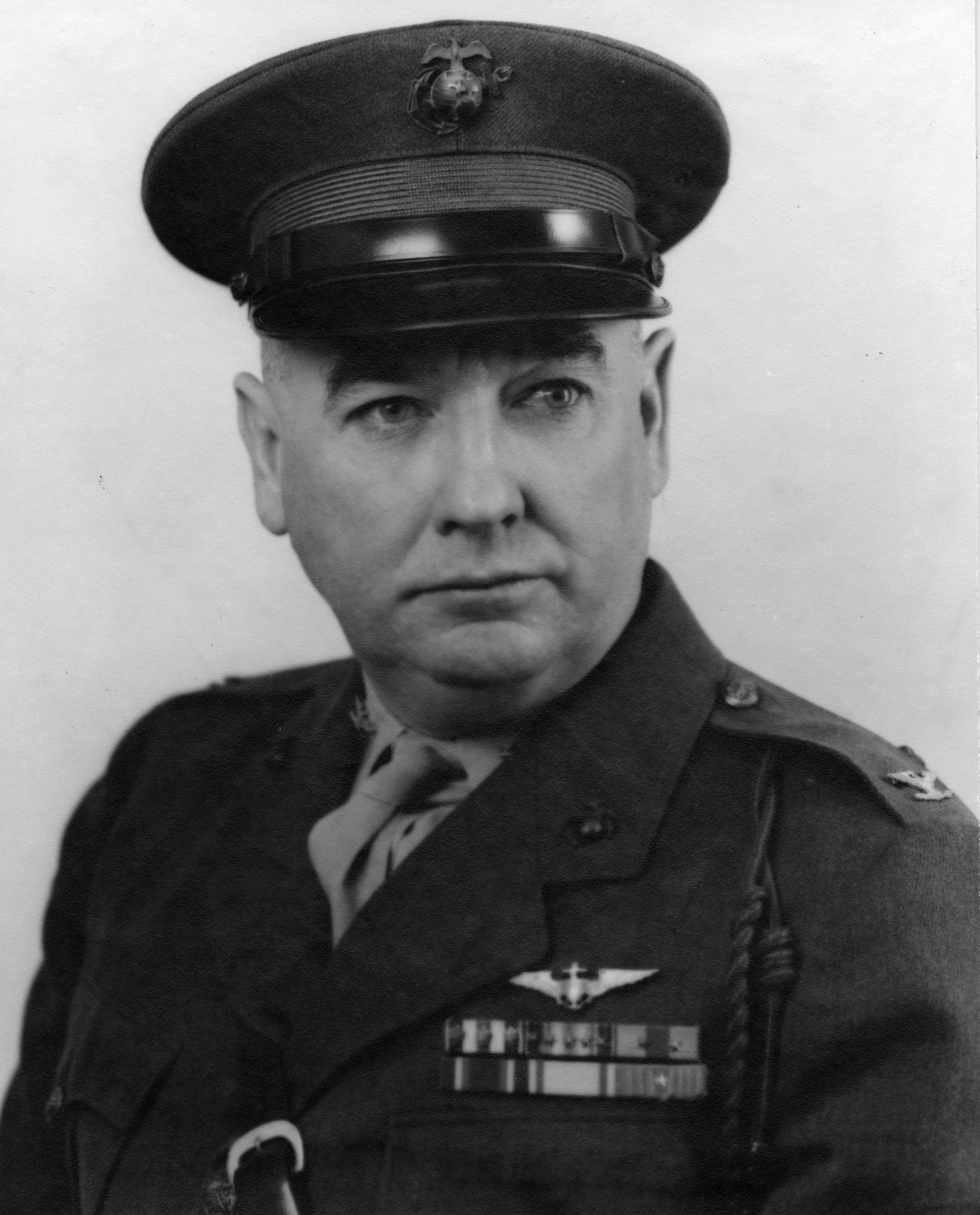
- Moriarty as Colonel, USMC
- Born: May 8, 1896; Holyoke, Massachusetts, US
- Died: January 30, 1981 (aged 84); Dallas, Texas, US
- Burial place: Sparkman-Hillcrest Memorial Park
- Military career
- Allegiance: United States
- Branch: United States Marine Corps
- Service years: 1917–1946
- Rank: Brigadier general
- Service number: 0-686
- Commands: 1st Marine Regiment
- Conflicts: World War I: Battle of Belleau Wood; Battle of Soissons; Battle of Saint-Mihiel; Battle of Blanc Mont Ridge; Meuse-Argonne Offensive; Dominican Campaign; Yangtze Patrol; World War II
- Awards: Silver Star (4); Navy Commendation Medal

James Frederick Moriarty (May 8, 1896 – January 30, 1981) was a highly decorated officer in the United States Marine Corps with the rank of brigadier general. A veteran of World War I, he distinguished himself several times as a company officer with the 6th Machine Gun Battalion and received four awards of the Silver Star.

Moriarty remained a Marine following the war and took part in the several expeditionary tours. During the World War II, he served as the commanding officer of the Marine barracks at Balboa, Panama Canal Zone.

== Early career and World War I ==
James F. Moriarty was born on May 8, 1896, at Holyoke, Massachusetts. He was the son of William and Sarah Jane Moriarty. Following high school, he entered the Citadel in Charleston, South Carolina, and graduated in April 1917 with a bachelor's degree. Following graduation, Moriarty was commissioned as a second lieutenant in the Marine Corps on April 30, 1917, and was ordered to Port Royal, South Carolina, for basic officer training.

Upon the completion of training, he was ordered to Marine Barracks Quantico, Virginia, where he joined the newly activated 5th Marine Regiment as a platoon leader. Moriarty participated in intensive training until August 1917, when he was transferred to the newly activated 6th Machine Gun Battalion.

He was attached to the 15th Company under Captain Matthew H. Kingman and embarked for France at the end of December 1917. Moriarty took part in another period of training, before his unit was ordered to the trenches in the Verdun sector for support of the 5th and 6th Marine Regiments in March 1918.

Moriarty participated in the Battle of Belleau Wood in June 1918 and was promoted to captain shortly thereafter. He assumed command of Headquarters Company and led it during the Battle of Soissons. Moriarty distinguished himself during that battle near Vierzy on July 18–22, 1918. During the German counterattack, he skillfully placed his machine guns under heavy enemy artillery and machine gun fire and helped to repel the enemy's attack. For his repeated acts of bravery during that action, he was decorated with three Silver Stars for three separate engagements.

In October 1918, Moriarty led his company during the Battle of Blanc Mont Ridge and distinguished himself again on several occasions. He was subsequently decorated with a fourth Silver Star and also received the French Croix de guerre 1914–1918 with Guilt Star. Moriarty was also entitled to wear the French Fourragère.

== Interwar period ==
Upon the Armistice of 11 November 1918, Moriarty participated in the occupation of the Rhineland, before he was ordered to the United States in April 1919. He then served briefly at Headquarters Marine Corps in Washington, D.C., before he was sent to the Philippines, where he served with the Marine barracks at the Cavite Navy Yard for one year.

While in the Philippines, Moriarty joined the Marine detachment aboard the cruiser USS Albany in September 1920 and participated in patrols in the Chinese waters. He returned to the United States in April 1922 and entered the flight training at Naval Air Station Pensacola, Florida. Moriarty successfully completed the training and earned his Naval Aviator wings in June 1923.

He was then attached to the Second Marine Brigade and sailed to Santo Domingo in February 1924 as a member of Marine Observation Squadron 1 under Major Ross E. Rowell. Moriarty participated in the patrol flights until August of that year and then served on various Air stations stateside. He was detached from Aviation duty due to budget cuts in April 1927 and sailed for expeditionary duty to China, where he participated in the guard duty at Shanghai International Settlement until September 1928.

Moriarty then served with the Marine barracks on Guam until his return to the United States in June 1929. Another tour in China followed in November 1931, when he returned to Shanghai and served with the Marine detachment aboard the gunboat USS Palos and took part in the patrol cruises in the lower Yangtze River and its tributaries. Moriarty departed China in December 1934 and then served in the Paymaster Department, Headquarters Marine Corps in Washington, D.C. as Assistant Paymaster under Brigadier general George Richards, before he was ordered back to China for his third tour of duty in October 1937. He was stationed in Shanghai during the Second Sino-Japanese War and served as an intelligence officer with the 2nd Marine Brigade under Brigadier General John C. Beaumont.

== World War II ==
Moriarty returned to the United States in February 1941 and joined the First Marine Brigade at Guantánamo Bay, Cuba. He assumed duty as commanding officer of the 1st Marine Regiment, 1st Marine Division on April 2, 1941, and later commanded the regiment during the amphibious exercise at Onslow Beach, North Carolina, under Major General Philip H. Torrey in late of that year. The exercise did not go well for the 1st Marine Division and its regiments, because of the problems with landing boats and insufficient ground warfare training of the 1st Division men. Major General Holland Smith, commanding general of the Amphibious Force, Atlantic Fleet, questioned the command abilities of Torrey and some division's commanding officers.

Based on this experience, General Smith relieved 1st Marine Division commanding general Philip H. Torrey at the end of March 1942 and appointed Alexander Vandegrift as his substitute. Vandegrift made his own personnel changes and relieved Moriarty as commanding officer of the 1st Marine Regiment; Colonel LeRoy P. Hunt as Divisional Chief of Staff; Colonel George E. Monson as Divisional Logistics officer and others.

Moriarty never held a combat command again and was ordered for brief duty to Marine Barracks, Parris Island, South Carolina and subsequently to Marine Corps Base San Diego, California.

In August 1942, he assumed command of the Marine barracks at Puget Sound Navy Yard in Bremerton, Washington, and hold that post until the beginning of April 1944. Moriarty then sailed for Panama Canal Zone for duty as commanding officer of the Marine barracks at Balboa. In this capacity he was responsible for defense of the Canal Zone against possible Japanese attack and received the Navy Commendation Medal for his service.

He returned to the United States in March 1946 and served briefly with the Marine barracks at Brooklyn Navy Yard and Marine Corps Base Quantico, Virginia, before he was ordered for retirement. Moriarty retired from the Marine Corps on December 1, 1946, after almost 30 years of active duty and was advanced to the rank of brigadier general for having been specially commended in combat.

== Death ==
Upon his retirement, Moriarty settled first in Winter Park, Florida, and then in Dallas, Texas, where he died on January 30, 1981. He is buried at Sparkman-Hillcrest Memorial Park Cemetery in Dallas with his wife Mary. They had three sons: James, William and John.

== Decorations ==
Moriarty received the following decorations:

Naval Aviator Badge
1st Row	Silver Star with three Oak Leaf Clusters		Navy Commendation Medal
2nd Row	World War I Victory Medal with five battle clasps	Army of Occupation of Germany Medal	Marine Corps Expeditionary Medal with two stars
3rd Row	Yangtze Service Medal	China Service Medal	American Defense Service Medal with Fleet Clasp
4th Row	American Campaign Medal	World War II Victory Medal	French Croix de guerre 1914–1918 with Guilt Star

== See also ==
- 6th Machine Gun Battalion (United States Marine Corps)
- United States Naval Aviator

Military offices
Preceded by David L. S. Brewster	Commanding Officer, 1st Marine Regiment; April 2, 1941 – March 22, 1942	Succeeded by Julian N. Frisbie
