= 6th Machine Gun Battalion (United States Marine Corps) =

- Shoulder sleeve insignia of the 6th Machine Gun Battalion.
- Active: 17 August 1917 – 13 August 1919
- Country: United States of America
- Branch: United States Marine Corps
- Type: Infantry Battalion
- Role: Fire support
- Part of: 4th Marine Brigade
- Engagements: World War I: Aisne Defensive; Battle of Belleau Wood; Battle of Château-Thierry (1918); Battle of Saint-Mihiel; Battle of Blanc Mont Ridge; Meuse-Argonne offensive

Commanders
- Notable commanders: Edward B. Cole; Littleton W. T. Waller Jr. Matthew H. Kingman

The 6th Machine Gun Battalion was a battalion of the United States Marine Corps which served during World War I. Along with the 5th and 6th Marine Regiments, the battalion was part of the 4th Marine Brigade. After being formed in 1917, the battalion supported the Marine regiments by detaching machine gun companies to operate with the regimental battalions along the Western Front and to provide fire support to them during the fighting. In addition to this role, the battalion was sometimes employed as a complete unit with all its companies being concentrated together to ensure that maximum firepower was applied to various points along the front line in support of Allied attacks and also to defend against German assaults. The battalion also supported the operations of the 2nd Infantry Division. After the war, the unit undertook occupation duties in Germany before returning to the United States in mid-1919 where it was subsequently deactivated.

== History ==
=== Formation ===
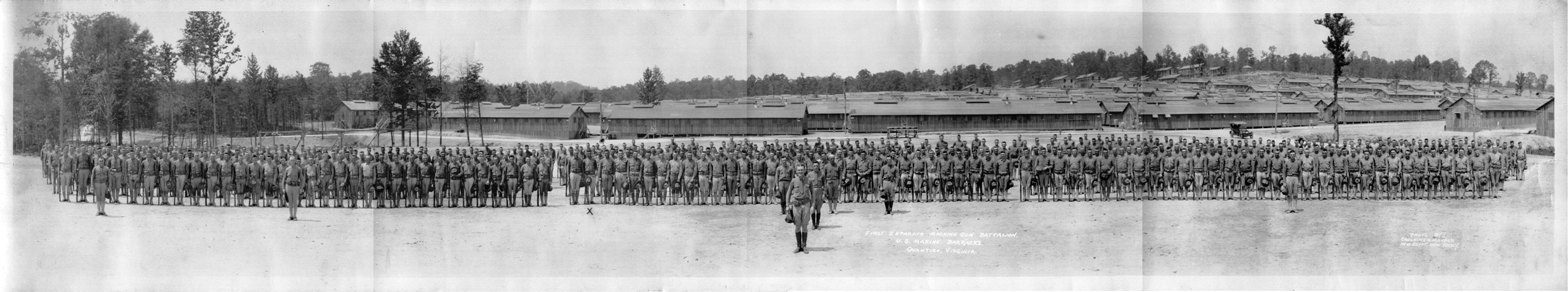
1st Machine Gun Battalion which was redesignated soon after it was formed to the 6th Machine Gun Battalion.

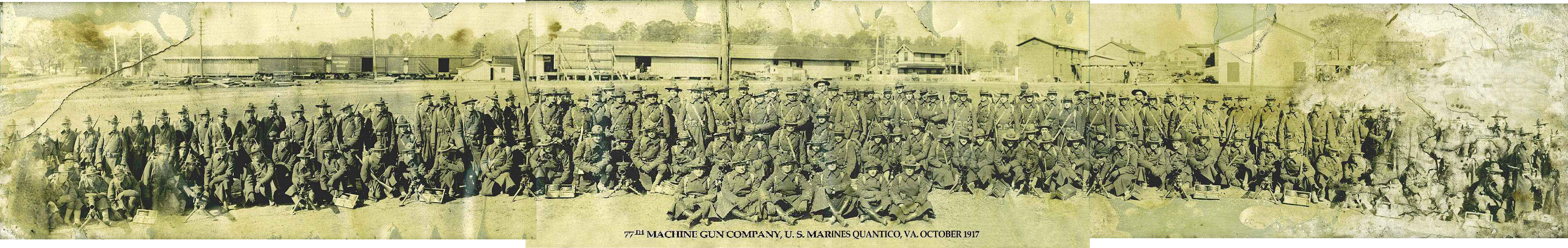
77th Machine Gun Company at Quantico.

The 6th Machine Gun Battalion was formed as the 1st Machine Gun Battalion on 17 August 1917 at Marine Corps Base Quantico, Virginia, under the command of Major Edward B. Cole. When the battalion was formed, it consisted of the Headquarters, 77th, and 81st Companies. Provision was made to add two more companies at a later date. Each company (excluding the HQ) was issued 16 Lewis Guns and 33 hand carts apiece. Between 27 August 1917 and 7 December 1917, the battalion undertook extensive training at Quantico which included weapon familiarization, pillbox construction, fire discipline and trench warfare doctrine. In addition, the 12th and 20th Companies and an Aviation Detachment were also attached to the battalion at this time and it was re-designated as a "provisional battalion". On 14 December 1917, the battalion embarked on the USS DeKalb and set sail for St. Nazaire, France.

=== Arrival in France ===
The USS DeKalb arrived at St. Nazaire on 28 December 1917. The unit then moved to the Bourmount Training Area at Haute-Marne where its Lewis Guns were replaced with Hotchkiss M1914 Machine Guns. Around this time the 12th and 20th Companies were detached from the battalion and sent to the 5th Marine Regiment.

The battalion then began a program of battle preparation and, as a part of this process, on 20 January 1918 they were redesignated the 6th Machine Gun Battalion. The 15th and 23rd Companies were detached from the 5th Marine Regiment and assigned permanently to the 6th Machine Gun Battalion. After two months of intense training, in March the battalion was committed to the fighting against the Germans. Over the course of the nine months that remained in the war, it would take part in all of the major battles that US forces were involved in along the Western Front.

=== Toulon Sector, Verdun: 15 March – 13 May 1918 ===
On 15 March, the 6th Machine Gun Battalion moved up to the Department of the Meuse, in the Verdun Sector, with the purpose of relieving the machine gun companies that were deployed in support of the 6th Marine Regiment at that time. This was the battalion's first experience of the front and although they were not involved in any major conflict at this time, it helped to prepare them for their later engagements by enabling them to learn about how the war was fought on the Western Front. The battalion was not deployed as a complete unit at this time though. Instead, it was split up and its individual companies were attached to the various battalions of the 5th and 6th Marine Regiments. The disposition of the battalion's companies at this time was as follows:

- 15th Company with the 3rd Battalion, Sixth Marines;
- 23rd Company with the 2nd Battalion, Fifth Marines;
- 77th Company with the 3rd Battalion, Fifth Marines;
- 81st Company with the 2nd Battalion, Sixth Marines.

=== Aisne Defensive, Château–Thierry Sector: 31 May – 9 July 1918 ===
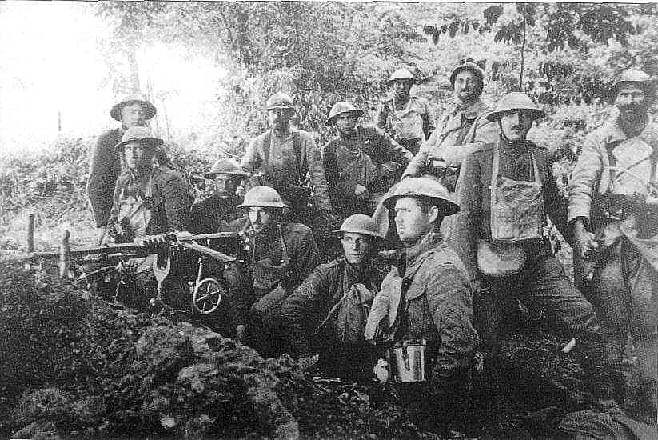
Members of the 77th Company, 6th Machine Gun Battalion, and French poilus near Belleau Wood. Unknown date.

In late May, the 6th Machine Gun Battalion was deployed to support the defensive operations in the Chateau–Thierry Sector. During this time they were employed as a complete unit in order to provide concentrated fire support at key points along the Allied line. The 77th and 81st Companies were assigned to the right flank while the 15th and 23rd Companies were assigned to the left. Their job was to lay down covering and harassing fire during both defensive and offensive operations. They also assisted the 5th and 6th Marine Regiments in their respective drives through Belleau Wood. On 10 June, the battalion's commanding officer, Major Cole, was mortally wounded and command temporarily passed to Captain Harlan E. Major. Captain George H. Osterhout took over on 11 June; however, he remained in command only until 21 June, when Major Littleton Waller officially took over.

The aggressiveness of the men of the 4th Marine Brigade during both the offensive and defensive phases of the Battle of Belleau Wood resulted in them being held in high esteem by the Germans serving in the trenches opposite them. In recognition of 4th Marine Brigade achievements during the fighting, the woods were later renamed the "Bois de la Brigade de Marine". In addition, the legend of the United States Marine Corps getting their nickname "Devil Dogs" came about as a result of this battle. In recognition of their many battle accomplishments, the Marines of the 5th and 6th Marine Regiments, and 6th Machine Gun Battalion were awarded the French Croix de Guerre three times. As a result, these units were authorized to wear the fourragère of the Croix de Guerre; it also subsequently became a part of the unit's patch. The fourragère thereafter became a part of the uniform of these units, and all members of the 5th and 6th Marine Regiments are now authorized to wear it while serving with those regiments.

=== Aisne–Marne Offensive (Soisson): 18–19 July 1918 ===
In mid-July the companies of the 6th Machine Gun Battalion were ordered into reserve in preparation to support the 5th and 6th Marine Regiments and the offensive they would be conducting. As the offensive unfolded, the individual companies were assigned to various Marine battalions until the offensive toward Vierzy and Tigny was over.

=== Marbache Sector: 9–16 August 1918 ===
In August, after a brief rest, the 6th Machine Gun Battalion's companies were again parceled out to the various battalions of the 5th and 6th Marine Regiments. Their dispositions during this time were as follows:

- 15th Company with the 3rd Battalion, Sixth Marines;
- 23rd Company with the 2nd Battalion, Fifth Marines;
- 77th Company with the 3rd Battalion, Fifth Marines;
- 81st Company with the 2nd Battalion, Sixth Marines.

This operation consisted mainly of a series of marches from Carrefour de la Croix to Camp Bois-l'Évêque. The battalion arrived at Camp Bois de L' Eveque on 18 August 1918. Their time at the camp was used to go through intensive training to further familiarize the Marines with their machine guns.

=== St. Mihiel Offensive: 12–16 September 1918 ===
Through a series of marches, the 6th Machine Gun Battalion moved from Camp Bois de L' Eveque to Bois des Hayes arriving on 8 September 1918. This camp was in close vicinity to the front line. The time spent at the camp was used to prepare ammunition and supply dumps, conduct a reconnaissance of the area, and set up firing positions for the upcoming offensive around Saint-Mihiel. The battalion went into battle on 12 September 1918. During the fighting, the 6th Machine Gun Battalion's companies were again assigned to their respective battalions within the two Marine regiments. The 6th Machine Gun Battalion's job was to lay down suppressive fire and to establish a defensive position until the respective Marine regimental battalions arrived.

=== Meuse–Argonne, Champagne (Blanc Mont): 1–10 October 1918 ===
The 6th Machine Gun Battalion was reassembled at Bois de Minorville on 16 September 1918. On 27 September 1918, the battalion moved up to a camp just north of Suippes. On 1 October 1918, the companies of the battalion were detached to their respective Marine regiments as follows:

- 15th Company with the 3rd Battalion, Sixth Marines;
- 23rd Company with the 2nd Battalion, Fifth Marines;
- 77th Company with the 3rd Battalion, Fifth Marines;
- 81st Company with the 2nd Battalion, Sixth Marines.

The operation called for the Marine regiments to advance on the Somme-Py in a night attack. After successfully making this advance, the 6th Machine Gun Battalion's companies laid down a heavy suppressing fire as both the 4th Marine Brigade and French 4th Army stormed Blanc Mont ridge. The companies stayed in place until relieved on 10 October 1918. The battalion was then reconstituted and moved to Camp Marchand. During its time at Marchand, command of the battalion passed to Major Matthew H. Kingman.

=== Meuse River Campaign: 1–11 November 1918 ===
The 6th Machine Gun Battalion's final battle came in early November when it took part in the fighting along the Meuse River. At this time, the companies were concentrated together and they went into battle as a formed unit. As the Germans were pushed back, the battalion advanced along with those of the 5th and 6th Marine Regiments toward the Meuse River. When the Meuse was reached at Mouzon, Ardennes, pontoon bridges were erected to make a crossing. Before they could cross the river, the armistice brought an end to the fighting.

=== Post World War I and deactivation ===
After the armistice was signed, the 6th Machine Gun Battalion along with the rest of the 4th Marine Brigade, was allocated to perform occupation duties as part of the Allied occupation of the Rhineland. After marching through Belgium and Luxembourg, the brigade reached the German frontier on 25 November 1918 and subsequently crossed over into Germany on 1 December 1918. On 10 December 1918, the 4th Marine Brigade headquartered at Heddesdorf where they were assigned the task of controlling the area around Coblenz.

Men from the 6th Machine Gun Battalion in Washington, D.C., on 12 August 1919. The photograph was taken either before or after the battalion's final parade.

On 5 July 1919, the order to transfer the Marine units to the Services of Supply branch for transport back to the United States was given. Ten days later, the last of the Marines boarded trains which took them to ports from where they would join transports that were to take them across the Atlantic. The 6th Machine Gun Battalion embarked aboard the Santa Paula and arrived in New York on 5 August 1919.

Three days later, the battalion took part in the parade in New York City. They were then transferred to Marine Corps Base Quantico, Virginia. On 12 August 1919, they participated in a parade in Washington, D.C. The following day, 13 August 1919, the 6th Machine Gun Battalion was deactivated while at Quantico.

== Awards ==
The 6th Machine Gun Battalion was awarded the following awards:

WWI Victory streamer	World War I Victory Medal with one silver star.
Army of Occupation Germany Medal	Army of Occupation of Germany Medal.
Croix de guerre	French Croix de Guerre with two palms and one Gilt star. All members of the 6th Machine Gun Battalion are authorized to wear the Fourragère of the Croix de Guerre.

== Casualty lists ==
The battalion suffered the following casualties, which are listed per battle.

	Killed	Wounded	Missing
Verdun Sector	1	9	0
Chateau–Thierry	40	175	1
Soissons Sector	17	75	3
St. Mihiel Sector	6	47	0
Champagne Sector	37	110	4
Argonne Sector	23	90	1
Marbache Sector	0	2	0
TOTALS	124	508	9

== Commanding officers ==
The following officers served as commanding officer of the 6th Machine Gun Battalion:

- Major Edward B. Cole: 17 August 1917 – 10 June 1918;
- Captain Harlan E. Major: 10 – 11 June 1918;
- Captain George H. Osterhout: 11 – 21 June 1918;
- Major Littleton W. T. Waller Jr.: 21 June – 24 October 1918;
- Major Matthew H. Kingman: 24 October 1918 – deactivation.

== Notable members ==
- Victor Bleasdale
- Harold D. Campbell
- James F. Moriarty
