= Ralph S. Keyser =

U.S. Marine Corps Major General

Ralph Stover Keyser
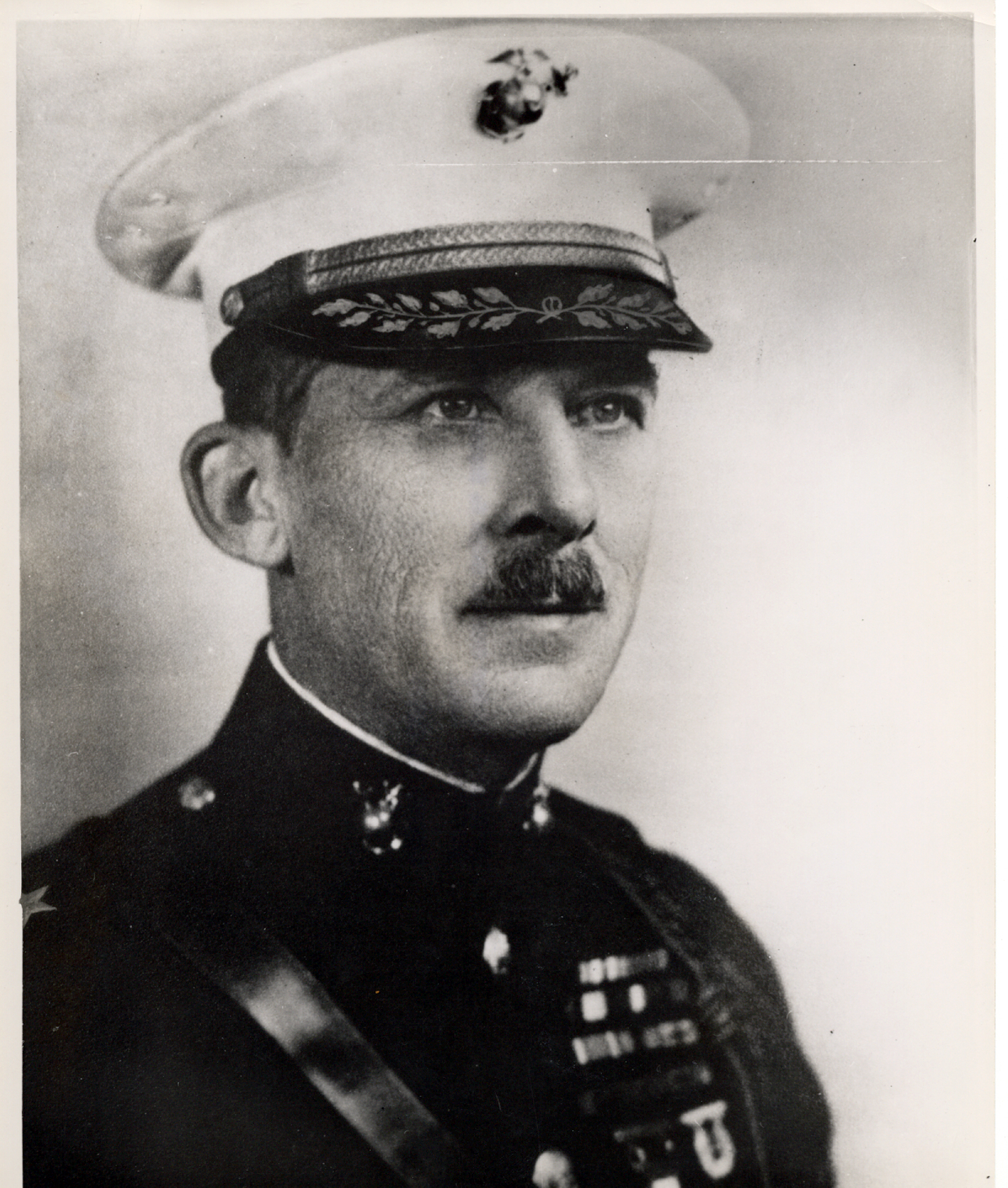
- Born: May 10, 1883; Thoroughfare, Virginia, US
- Died: April 19, 1955 (aged 71); Bethesda, Maryland, US
- Military career
- Allegiance: United States
- Branch: United States Marine Corps
- Service years: 1902–1937, 1941–1942
- Rank: Major general
- Service number: 0-510
- Commands: ACMC; 6th Marine Regiment; 2nd Battalion, 5th Marines
- Conflicts: Philippine–American War; Cuban Pacification; World War I: Battle of Belleau Wood; Battle of Château-Thierry; Battle of Soissons; Battle of Saint-Mihiel; Battle of Blanc Mont Ridge; Meuse-Argonne Offensive; Nicaraguan Campaign; World War II
- Awards: Navy Cross; Army Distinguished Service Medal; Silver Star (2); Legion of Honour

Ralph Stover Keyser (May 10, 1883 – April 19, 1955) was a highly decorated officer of the United States of America with the rank of major general, who is most noted for his service as the 15th Assistant to the Major General Commandant of the Marine Corps and a distinguished marksman, who participated in world matches. He was the recipient of Navy Cross, the United States military's second-highest decoration awarded for valor in combat.

== Early career ==
Ralph S. Keyser was born May 10, 1883, in Thoroughfare, Virginia, as a son of Charles Eugene and Mary Gill Stover Keyser. He enlisted in the United States Army in 1902 and participated in the Philippine–American War. He applied for Marine Corps commission during 1905 and was subsequently commissioned second lieutenant on March 29, 1905. Keyser was subsequently ordered to the School of Application at Annapolis, Maryland, for further officer training, which he completed in April 1906. Among his classmates at that time, were his lifelong friends Holland M. Smith, Andrew B. Drum and Maurice E. Shearer.

Following the school, he was attached to the Marine detachment aboard the newly commissioned battleship USS Louisiana and sailed to Cuba in order to suppress armed revolt of independence war veterans who defeated the meager government forces. Louisiana was then stationed in the Caribbean during the construction of Panama Canal and joined Great White Fleet in December 1907. While aboard the Louisiana, Keyser took part in the voyage around the world with the stops in Port of Spain, Rio de Janeiro, Punta Arenas, Melbourne, Sydney, Auckland, Manila, Yokohama, Singapore, entering the Indian Ocean in December 1908; they coaled in Colombo and passed through the Suez Canal with another stops in Port Said, Gibraltar, and finally returned to Hampton Roads on 22 February 1909.

Keyser was detached from Louisiana in April 1909 and promoted to the rank of first lieutenant one month later. He was subsequently ordered to Naval Air Station Pensacola, Florida for brief duty as commanding officer of Marine Barracks there and subsequently assumed duty as executive officer of the Marine Corps Rifle range at Wakefield, Massachusetts. He spent next three years with shooting competitions, winning first place in 1911 with Marine Corps rifle team at the Marine Barracks Guantanamo Bay, Cuba and first place at Camp Perry, Ohio, in 1911. He also qualified as Distinguished Marksman in 1911 and received Distinguished Marksman Badge.

He was ordered to Japan in January 1912 and served as assistant naval attache at the American embassy in Tokyo until February 1915. Keyser also became fluent in Japanese language during his service in Japan. Upon his return to the United States, Keyser was ordered as Range officer to the Marine Corps Rifle Range at Winthrop, Maryland and also captained Marine Rifle Team, which won 2nd place at the competition at the Naval Air Station Jacksonville, Florida. He was promoted to the rank of captain in September 1916 and assumed duty as aide to the commandant of the Marine Corps, George Barnett. While in this capacity, Keyser was promoted to the rank of major in May 1917.

== World War I ==
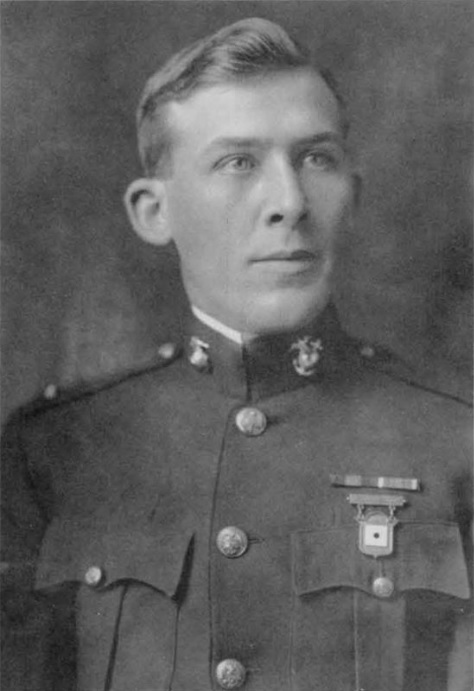
Ralph S. Keyser shown here as a first lieutenant.

Following the entry of the United States into World War I, Keyser requested combat in Europe. His request was granted and Keyser sailed in February 1918 to France where he served as an infantry officer and Marine Corps Intelligence officer. He joined the General Staff of 2nd Army Division under Major General Omar Bundy and served in the Intelligence section until the beginning of June 1918. Keyser subsequently joined 5th Marine Regiment and assumed duty as executive officer of 2nd Battalion under Lieutenant Colonel Frederic M. Wise.

Keyser subsequently took part in the Battle of Belleau Wood in June 1918 and assumed command of 2nd battalion on June 23. He distinguished himself and received his first Silver Star for bravery and led his battalion during the battle of Soissons on July 18, 1918. Keyser distinguished himself while leading the attack in the vicinity of Soissons in order to support of 3rd Brigade advance. His battalion suffered heavy casualties by German artillery, machine guns and snipers hidden in the woods, so Keyser assembled approximately 250 men of his battalion and led them one and half kilometer under enemy fire until they reached the woods of Léchelle. He ordered his men to dig in and placed his command post on the frontline in order to boost morale and fighting spirit. Keyser was slightly wounded on July 20 and ordered back to the staff od 2nd Army Division, now commanded by Marine Major General John A. Lejeune. For his gallantry in action at Soissons, Keyser was decorated together with three Silver Stars, but these decorations were later upgraded to Navy Cross, the United States military's second-highest decoration awarded for valor in combat.

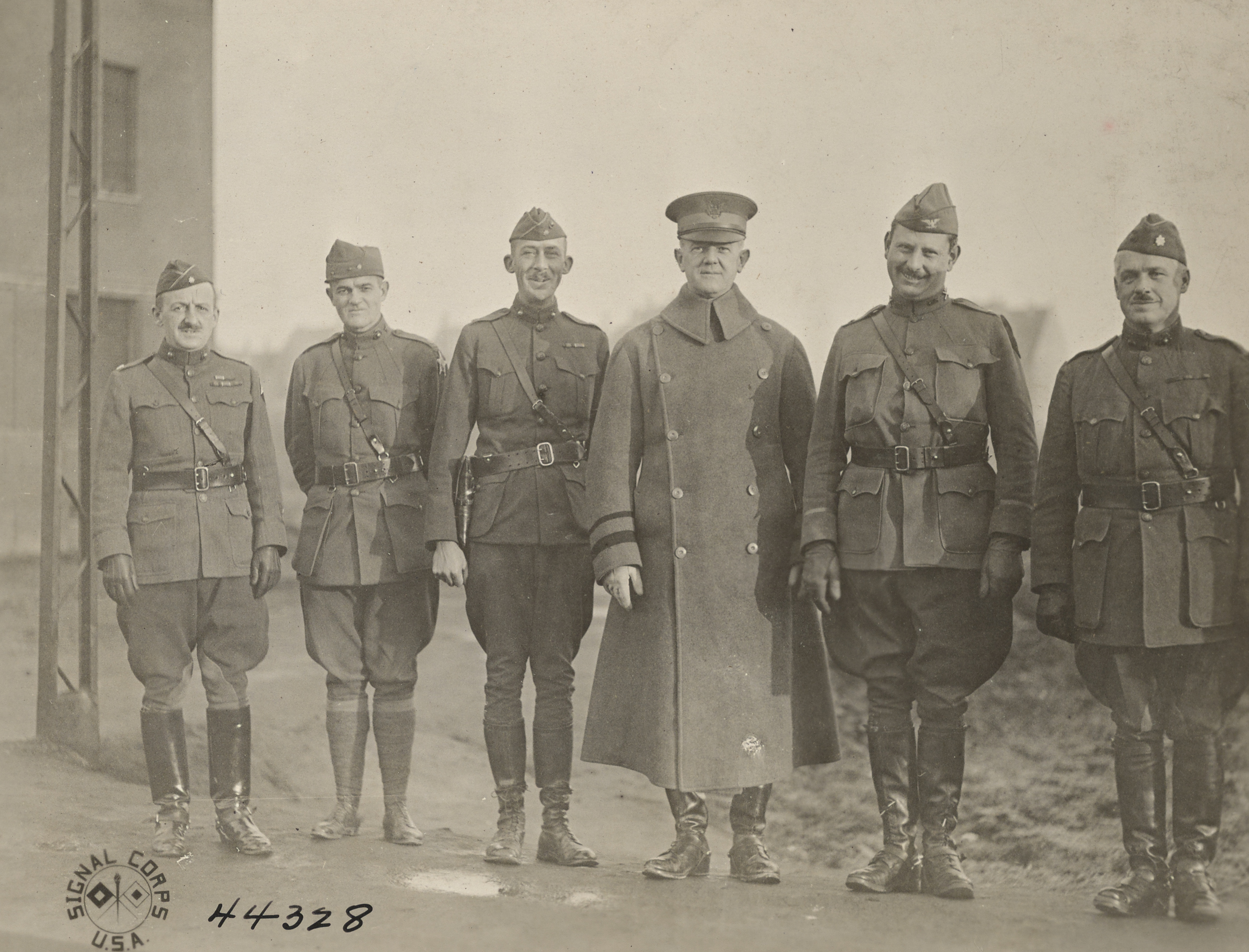
Senior staff officers of the 2nd Division in Germany, December 1918. Major Ralph S. Keyser is stood third on the left, next to Army Brigadier General Preston Brown.

While again on the staff of 2nd Army Division, Keyser served as assistant chief of staff for intelligence (G-2) during the battles of Saint-Mihiel in Meuse Department and Blanc Mont Ridge in Champagne province. He received his second Silver Star for gallantry in action during Blanc Mont Ridge battle.

Keyser remained on the staff of 2nd Army Division during the Meuse-Argonne Offensive and following the Armistice in November 1918, took part in the Occupation of the Rhineland in Coblenz. He was decorated with the Army Distinguished Service Medal for his service as Divisional Intelligence officer and also received Légion d'honneur, rank of Knight, French Croix de guerre 1914–1918 with Palm and Gilt Star and Belgian Order of the Crown, rank Officer.

== Interwar period ==
Keyser returned to the United States with the rest of Fourth Marine Brigade in August 1919 and assumed duty with the recruiting office in Atlanta, Georgia. He held this assignment until March 1920, when he was transferred to Quantico for duty with 6th Marine Regiment. Keyser also held temporary command of the regiment from November 1923 to February 1924. While at Quantico, he also captained the Marine Corps Rifle Team until March 1924, when he was ordered for expeditionary duty to Nicaragua. While stationed in Managua as commanding officer of the Marine detachment at the American embassy, he drafted the plans of Nicaraguan constabulary. His proposal were adopted by the State Department, with the personal commendation of Secretary of State Charles Evans Hughes, and were formally presented to the Nicaraguan government.

He was ordered back to the United States in August 1925 and served at the Headquarters Marine Corps in Washington, D.C., with the section of Operations and Training until April 1930. Keyser also acted as captain of the U.S. international rifle team at the World Matches in Stockholm, Sweden, in 1929. He was promoted to the rank of lieutenant colonel in September 1930 and following his promotion to colonel in May 1934, he was appointed director of Operations and Training Division in the office of the major general commandant, John H. Russell. Keyser was commended for his administration and development of that division by the commandant.

His tour of duty at Headquarters Marine Corps ended in June 1936, and Keyser requested retirement, which was granted on February 1, 1937. He was advanced to the rank of brigadier general on the retired list for having been specially commended in combat.

== World War II ==
Keyser was contacted by his old friend, now Commandant of the Marine Corps, Thomas Holcomb in March 1941 and asked whether he would return to active duty. Keyser agreed and following the doctors examination, he was recalled to active duty in June 1941 with the rank of brigadier general. He was appointed director of the Division of Reserve and served in this capacity until March 1942. Holcomb commended Keyser for his work in officer procurement and subsequently asked President Roosevelt for nominating him for that office of Assistant Commandant of the Marine Corps.

Roosevelt approved the nomination and Keyser was appointed to the capacity of Assistant Commandant of the Marine Corps in March 1942. But Keyser's heart condition forced him to leave the office in May of that year, and he was ordered to the Naval hospital in Bethesda for treatment. His health did not get better, and Keyser retired again on October 1, 1942. He was not called back to active duty for the duration of the war and was also promoted to the rank of major general on the retired list for having been specially commended in combat.

Keyser died on April 19, 1955, in the Naval Hospital, Bethesda, Maryland. He is buried together with his wife Charlotte Capers (1896–1992) at Arlington National Cemetery, Virginia.

== Decorations ==
Here is the ribbon bar of Major General Keyser:

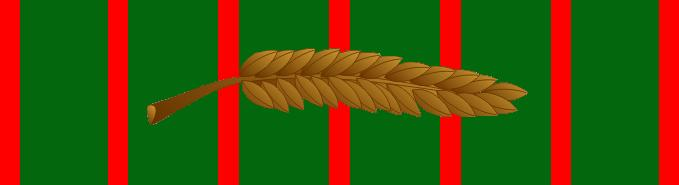
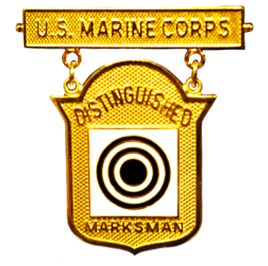

1st Row	Navy Cross		Army Distinguished Service Medal		Silver Star Medal with Oak leaf cluster	French Fourragère
2nd Row	Purple Heart Medal	Marine Corps Expeditionary Medal	Philippine Campaign Medal	Cuban Pacification Medal		French Fourragère
3rd Row	World War I Victory Medal with four battle clasps	Army of Occupation of Germany Medal	American Defense Service Medal	American Campaign Medal		French Fourragère
4th Row	World War II Victory Medal	Chevalier of the Légion d'honneur	French Croix de guerre 1914–1918 with Palm and Gilt Star	Officer of the Ordre de la Couronne		French Fourragère
Badges	Marine Corps Distinguished Marksman Badge		Pistol Expert Badge			

== See also ==
- Assistant Commandant of the Marine Corps

Military offices
Preceded by Charles D. Barrett	Assistant Commandant of the Marine Corps; March 28, 1942 – May 24, 1942	Succeeded by Harry Schmidt
Preceded by Samuel M. Harrington	Director of the Marine Corps Reserve; June 17, 1941 – March 14, 1942	Succeeded by Philip H. Torrey
