= General Waller =

General Waller may refer to:

- Bill Waller Jr. (born 1952), U.S. Army brigadier general
- Calvin Waller (1937–1996), U.S. Army lieutenant general
- Littleton Waller (1856–1926), U.S. Marine Corps major general
- Littleton W. T. Waller Jr. (1886–1967), U.S. Marine Corps major general
- William Waller (c. 1597–1668), English Army major general
