= Maurice E. Shearer =

United States Marine Corps general

Maurice Edwin Shearer
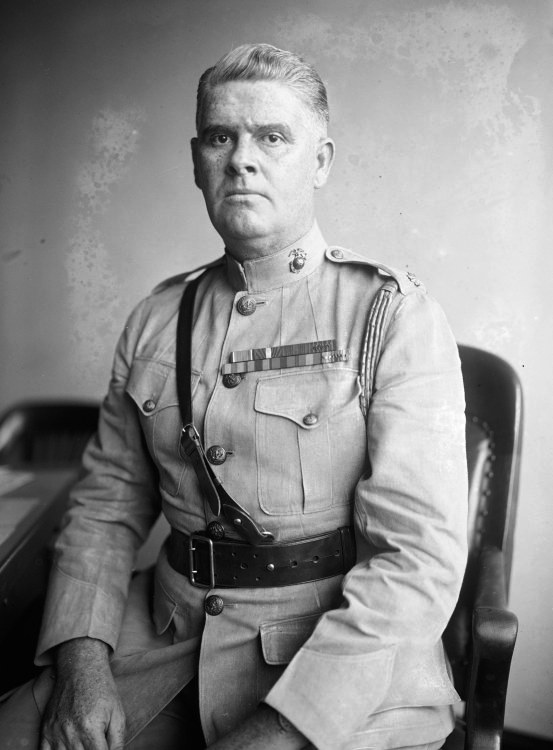
- Born: December 19, 1879; Marion County, Indiana, U.S.
- Died: June 26, 1953 (aged 73)
- Burial place: Arlington National Cemetery
- Military career
- Allegiance: United States of America
- Branch: United States Marine Corps
- Service years: 1901–1944
- Rank: Brigadier general
- Service number: 0-884
- Unit: 5th Marine Regiment
- Commands: 1st Battalion, 6th Marine Regiment 3rd Battalion, 5th Marine Regiment 2nd Marine Division
- Conflicts: Spanish–American War; World War I: Battle of Belleau Wood; Haitian Campaign; Nicaraguan Campaign; World War II
- Awards: Distinguished Service Cross; Navy Cross; Silver Star; French Legion of Honour

Maurice Edwin Shearer (December 19, 1879 – June 26, 1953) was a highly decorated Brigadier General in the United States Marine Corps. In 1918, Major Shearer of the 5th Marine Regiment, led Marines in the World War I Battle of Belleau Wood in France, where he was awarded the Navy Cross, Distinguished Service Cross, Navy Distinguished Service Medal, Silver Star, French Legion of Honor (Chevalier) and Croix de Guerre.

== Early life and education ==
Shearer was born on December 19, 1879, to Mary Jane McClelland and Samuel Henry Shearer. He attended Shortridge High School in Indianapolis, Indiana, but dropped out before graduation to join the 27th Indiana Battery Light Infantry, in which he served during the Spanish–American War. After leaving the battery, he moved to Ohio and served as a manager for a contracting company.

== Marine Corps career ==
In 1901, Shearer enlisted in the United States Marine Corps and rose to the rank of sergeant. He received a commission as an officer in 1905, scoring fourth in his commission exams. Immediately following commission, he attended the School of Application at Annapolis, Maryland, with classmates Holland Smith, Ralph S. Keyser and Andrew B. Drum. In July, Shearer sailed for duty to be the commander of the 35 man Marine detachment on Midway Island.

In May 1908, he was selected for promotion to first lieutenant and to the rank of captain in June 1916.

During World War I, forces under Major Shearer's command made an attack on Belleau Wood, finally clearing that forest of Germans. On 26 June 1918, he sent a now famous report: "Woods now U.S. Marine Corps entirely," ending one of the bloodiest and most ferocious battles U.S. forces would fight in the war.

Following his return to the United States, Shearer was reverted to the rank of captain and served with the Marine Recruiting Station in Detroit, Michigan. He was promoted to the permanent rank of major on June 4, 1920, and served as officer in charge of the recruit station in Detroit until September 1922. He was subsequently ordered to Washington, D.C., and appointed the Marine aide to Secretary of the Navy Edwin Denby.

His duty in Washington ended in September 1923, when he was attached to the 1st Marine Brigade and sailed to Haiti in order to support government forces against rebels. Shearer served in the Caribbean until September 1925 and after two-years tour of duty in the United States, he sailed to Nicaragua as a member of the 5th Marine Regiment in June 1927. Following his return one year later, Shearer served with the Marine Barracks Parris Island, South Carolina, and on the staff of Marine Corps Schools, Quantico and was promoted to the rank of lieutenant colonel in October 1930.

Shearer served as commanding officer of the Marine barracks at Charleston Naval Shipyard, South Carolina, until January 1937, when he was ordered to Washington, D.C., and attached to the Adjutant and Inspector's Department at Headquarters Marine Corps under Brigadier General Clayton B. Vogel. Shearer was promoted to the rank of colonel in November 1937.

During World War II, Shearer remained in active service with the rank of colonel and served as commanding officer of the Marine barracks within Mare Island Naval Shipyard, California. He also held additional duty as commanding officer of 12th Marine Reserve District and finally retired from the Marine Corps on January 1, 1944. Shearer was advanced to the rank of brigadier general on the retired list for having been specially commended in combat.

== Personal life ==
On December 28, 1908, Shearer married his first wife, Madeline M. Brown, the daughter of astronomer Stimson Joseph Brown. On June 6, 1928, he married Nancy Caperton Shepard, the widow of fellow Marine Ralph Lunt Shepard.

Maurice Shearer died in 1953, and is buried in Arlington National Cemetery.

== Decorations ==

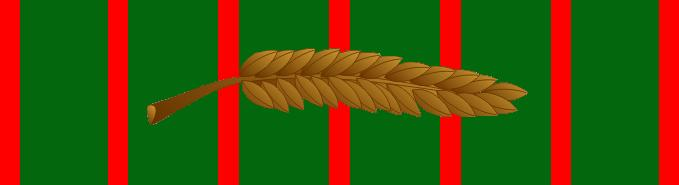

1st Row	Navy Cross		Distinguished Service Cross	Navy Distinguished Service Medal	French Fourragère
2nd Row	Silver Star	Marine Good Conduct Medal	Marine Corps Expeditionary Medal	Spanish Campaign Medal	French Fourragère
3rd Row	Army of Puerto Rican Occupation Medal	Mexican Service Medal	World War I Victory Medal with five battle clasps	Army of Occupation of Germany Medal	French Fourragère
4th Row	Nicaraguan Campaign Medal (1933)	American Defense Service Medal	American Campaign Medal	World War II Victory Medal	French Fourragère
5th Row	Chevalier of the Légion d'honneur	French Croix de guerre 1914-1918 with palm	Verdun Medal	Nicaraguan Presidential Order of Merit with gold star	French Fourragère
