= Matthew H. Kingman =

U.S. Marine Corps Brigadier General

Matthew Henry Kingman
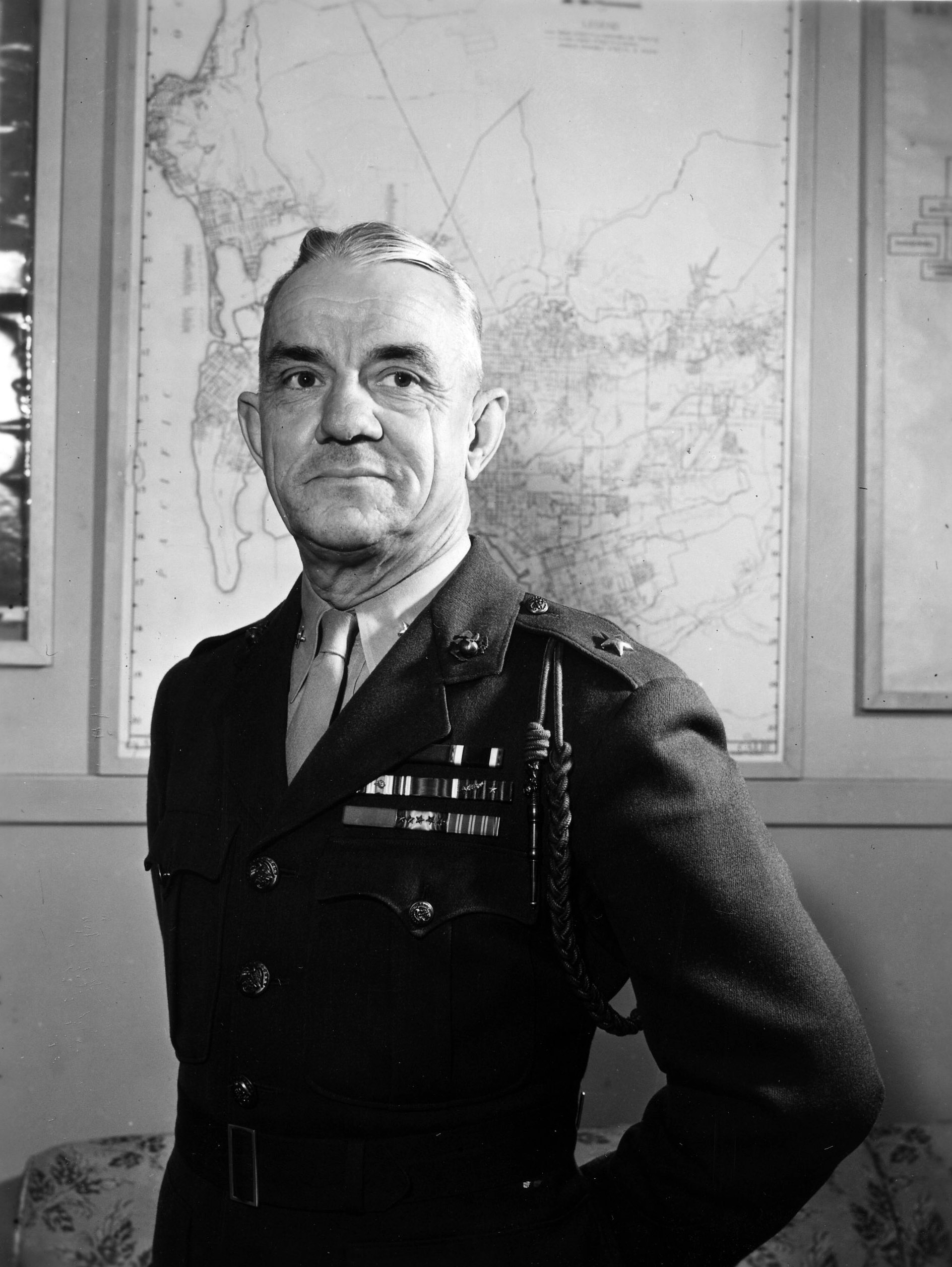
- Brigadier General Matthew H. Kingman, USMC
- Born: March 1, 1890; Humeston, Iowa, US
- Died: November 16, 1946 (aged 56); Bethesda, Maryland, US
- Burial place: Arlington National Cemetery
- Military career
- Allegiance: United States
- Branch: United States Marine Corps
- Service years: 1913–1940, 1942–1944
- Rank: Brigadier general
- Service number: 0-520
- Commands: MCB San Diego; Camp Elliott; 6th Machine Gun Battalion
- Conflicts: World War I: Battle of Belleau Wood; Battle of Soissons; Battle of Saint-Mihiel; Battle of Blanc Mont Ridge; Meuse-Argonne Offensive; Banana Wars: Nicaraguan Campaign; Haitian Campaign; World War II
- Awards: Silver Star (2); Purple Heart

Matthew Henry Kingman (March 1, 1890 – November 16, 1946) was a decorated officer of the United States Marine Corps with the rank of brigadier general, who is most noted for his service as commanding officer of the 6th Machine Gun Battalion during World War I and as commanding general of training center at Camp Elliott, California, during World War II.

== Early career ==
Matthew H. Kingman was born on March 1, 1890, in Humeston, Iowa. He attended the Virginia Military Institute in Lexington, Virginia, and graduated in 1913 with Bachelor of Science degree in civil engineering. Kingman subsequently joined the Marine Corps on November 24, 1913, and was commissioned second lieutenant on the same date. His first assignment was at the Officers Basic School, Norfolk, Virginia, where he attended instruction course. Kingman was in the same company with some future Marine Corps generals, like for example William H. Rupertus, Allen H. Turnage, Henry Louis Larsen, Keller E. Rockey, Lyle H. Miller and Alphonse DeCarre.

He was subsequently assigned to the Marine detachment aboard the battleship USS Delaware in June 1915 and served there as junior Marine officer until April 1917. During his service aboard USS Delaware, Kingman was promoted to the rank of first lieutenant on August 29, 1916, and subsequently to the rank of captain on March 26, 1917. He was transferred to the 15th Company, 3rd Battalion, 6th Marine Regiment stationed at Marine Barracks Quantico, Virginia, in April 1917 and was appointed company's commander. The 15th Company was used to form 6th Machine Gun Battalion under the command of Major Edward B. Cole in August 1917. Kingman sailed to France in December 1917 and subsequently commanded his company during the Battle of Belleau Wood in June 1918. He was cited for gallantry in action and subsequently decorated with the Silver Star citation during that battle. Kingman wounded by enemy machine gun fire on June 6, 1918, and stayed in hospital for treatment until July. Kingman then participated in the Battle of Soissons and Battle of Saint-Mihiel and finally distinguished himself again at the beginning of October 1918. He displayed courage, coolness and leadership during the Battle of Blanc Mont Ridge and was decorated with his second Silver Star. Kingman was also decorated for bravery with French Croix de guerre 1914–1918 with Palm and Star and Fourragère by the Government of France.

Captain Kingman was promoted to the temporary rank of major at the end of October 1918 and placed in command of 6th Machine Gun Battalion. He succeeded Major Littleton W. T. Waller Jr., who was appointed division machine gun officer of the 2nd Division. Major Kingman commanded the 6th MG Battalion during the Meuse-Argonne Offensive and subsequently participated with this unit in occupation duties in Germany. He was ordered back to the United States in August 1919.

== Interwar period ==
After his return to the United States, Kingman was assigned to the recruiting office in New Orleans in September 1919. He spent there two years, before he was ordered to Marine Barracks Quantico, where he served as instructor of tactics within Field Officer's Senior Course at Marine Corps School. Kingman was subsequently assigned to the 1st Brigade of Marines and sent to Haiti in April 1923. While in Haiti, he was appointed department inspector within Garde d'Haïti and stayed there until June 1926. Kingman was ordered back to Quantico base and attended Field Officer's Senior Course at Marine Corps School, graduating in May 1927.

He was subsequently appointed executive officer of 2nd Battalion, 11th Marine Regiment in May 1927 and sent to Nicaragua. Kingman was stationed in the town Corinto and where his regiment was disbanded at the end of July 1927. He was decorated for his service with Presidential Medal of Merit with Star by the Government of Nicaragua.

Following his return to the States, Kingman was assigned to the Division of Operations and Training within Headquarters Marine Corps in Washington, D.C., and promoted to the permanent rank of major on September 7, 1927. He was transferred to the Marine detachment aboard cruiser USS Memphis and served within Special Service Squadron in Latin America. However he was back in Headquarters Marine Corps in July 1933 and remained there until May 1935. While served there, Kingman was promoted to the rank of lieutenant colonel in May 1934. Following month, he was assigned back to Marine Barracks Quantico and appointed to the capacity of executive officer of the 5th Marine Regiment. Kingman also served simultaneously as post adjutant and chief of staff. He then served as chief of staff with Department of Pacific and later as executive officer of the 2nd Marine Brigade under command of Brigadier General Clayton B. Vogel. While served there, Kingman was promoted to the rank of colonel on September 1, 1938.

== World War II ==
Colonel Kingman retired on April 1, 1940, due to physical disability from the wounds received in World War I. However, he was recalled to active duty on February 11, 1942, and appointed tactical instructor of 2nd Marine Division. Kingman also served simultaneously as commanding officer of Marine Corps Base San Diego from March 19 to April 2, 1942. He was relieved from command of San Diego base by Colonel James L. Underhill.

In May 1942, Kingman was appointed commanding officer of the Fleet Marine Force Training Center at Camp Elliott, California. Additionally to his new duties, he was promoted to the rank of brigadier general in August 1942. Kingman served in this capacity until 27 April 1944, when he was appointed commanding general of Marine Corps Base San Diego. He was relieved on August 9, 1944, by Brigadier General Archie F. Howard. Kingman was then transferred to Washington, D.C., where he was attached to the Office of Strategic Services.

He finally retired from the Marine Corps on October 14, 1944, and held no other command for rest of the war. Brigadier General Matthew H. Kingman died from cerebral hemorrhage on November 16, 1946, in Bethesda Naval Hospital, Maryland. He is buried at Arlington National Cemetery, Virginia, together with his wife, Nina Reeves Kingman.

== Decorations ==
Here is the ribbon bar of Brigadier General Matthew H. Kingman:

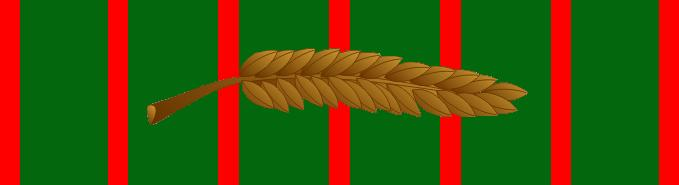

1st Row	Silver Star with Oak Leaf Cluster	Purple Heart	Marine Corps Expeditionary Medal	
2nd Row	World War I Victory Medal with five Battle clasps	Army of Occupation of Germany Medal	Second Nicaraguan Campaign Medal	American Defense Service Medal
3rd Row	American Campaign Medal	World War II Victory Medal	French Croix de guerre 1914–1918 with Palm and Star	Nicaraguan Presidential Medal of Merit with Star
