= Archie F. Howard =

U.S. Marine Corps Major General

Archie Franklin Howard
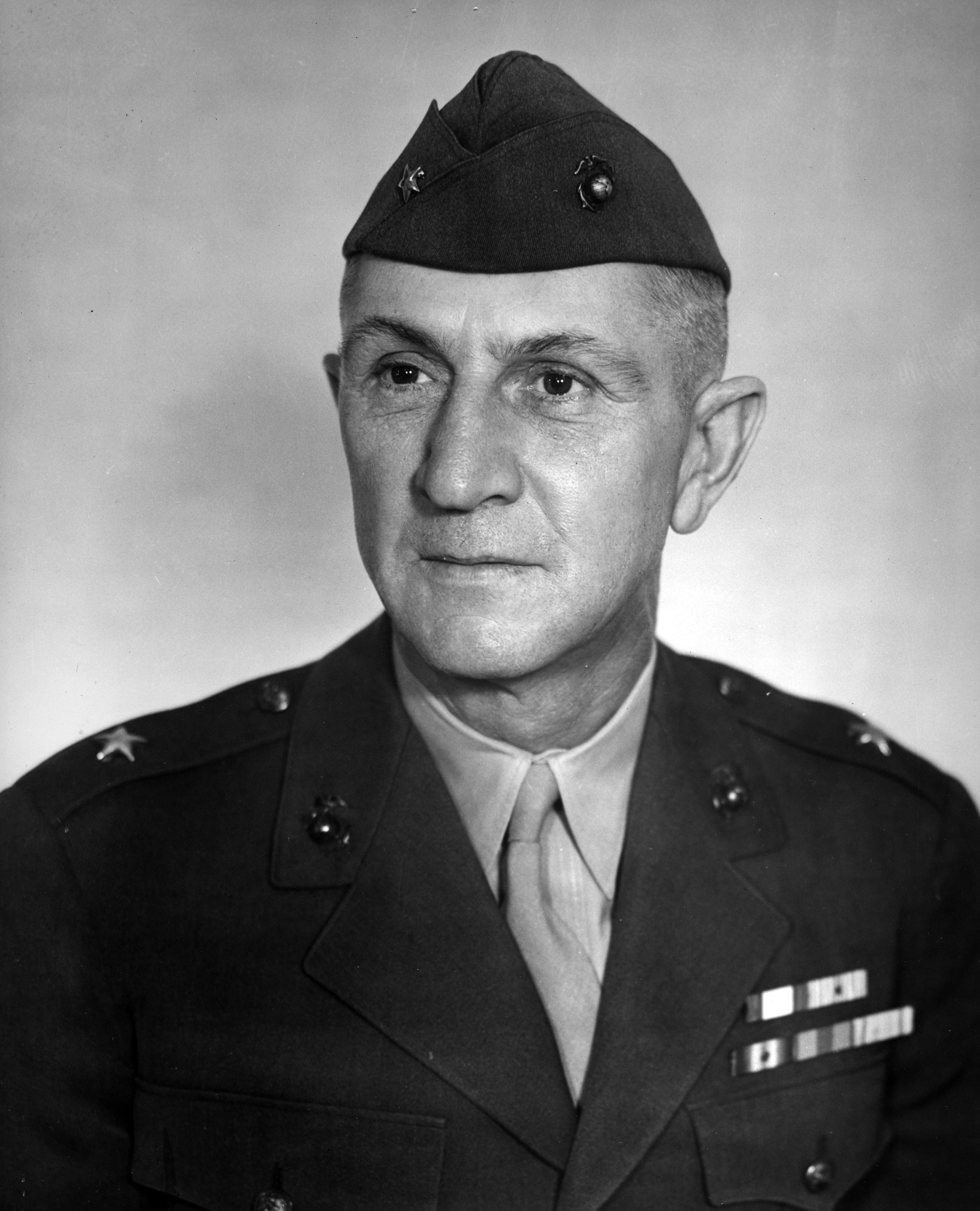
- Howard as Brigadier general, USMC
- Born: January 29, 1892; Clay Center, Kansas, US
- Died: June 24, 1964 (aged 72); San Diego, California, US
- Burial place: Fort Rosecrans National Cemetery
- Military career
- Allegiance: United States
- Branch: United States Marine Corps
- Service years: 1915–1946
- Rank: Major General
- Commands: 6th Marine Division; Marine Corps Base San Diego; CoS of I Marine Amphibious Corps
- Conflicts: World War I: Siberian Intervention; Dominican Campaign; World War II: New Georgia Campaign; Chinese Civil War: Operation Beleaguer
- Awards: Distinguished Service Medal

Archie Franklin Howard (January 29, 1892 – June 24, 1964) was a decorated officer of the United States Marine Corps with the rank of major general who is most noted as commanding general, 6th Marine Division during the Chinese Civil War. He also served as Island Commander at Guadalcanal and later at New Georgia during World War II.

== Early career ==
Archie F. Howard was born on January 29, 1892, at Clay Center, Kansas, as the son of Wilbur A. and Susan Viola Howard. Following the high school, he received appointment to the United States Naval Academy at Annapolis, Maryland, in summer of 1911 and graduated with bachelor's degree four years later. During his time at the academy, he was active in football and crew teams.

Howard was commissioned on June 5, 1915, and ordered to the Marine Officer School at Norfolk Navy Yard for additional officer training, which he completed in December of that year. He was subsequently transferred to the Marine barracks at Mare Island Navy Yard, California and joined the Marine detachment aboard the cruiser USS Brooklyn in December 1916. The USS Brooklyn served as the flagship of the commander in chief, Asiatic Fleet, Vice Admiral Austin M. Knight, and Howard saw service in the waters off the coast of China, Japan and Russia. He was promoted to the rank of first lieutenant in April 1917, and, following his promotion to captain six months later, he assumed command of the Brooklyn's detachment.

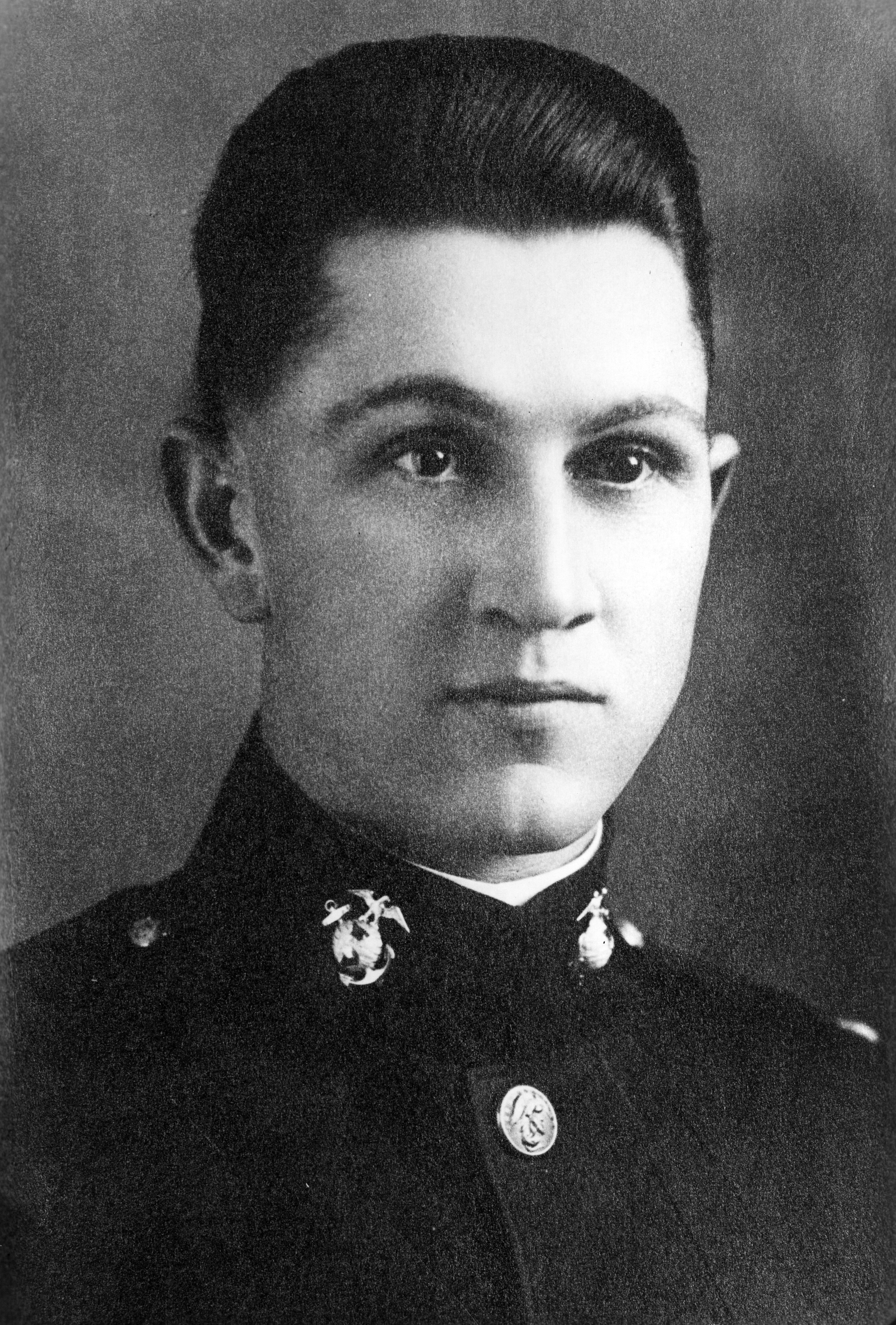
Howard as First lieutenant in 1917.

During the ongoing Russian Civil War between Bolsheviks and White forces, Brooklyn was ordered to the Vladivostok, Siberia where Czechoslovak Legion fought with Bolsheviks. Howard and his detachment were ordered ashore in June 1918 in order to protect American consulate in Vladivostok, Siberia. His marines took part in the patrolling of the street together with Czechoslovak legions and other allied forces, but did not participate in the action against Bolsheviks.

Upon his return to the United States, Howard was attached to the Marine Barracks Quantico in November 1918 and was stationed there for one year, before he was ordered to Houston, Texas, for recruiting duty. He was ordered for expeditionary duty in Santo Domingo in February 1922 and participated in the anti-guerilla operations with 2nd Marine Brigade under Colonel Harry Lee.

He was later attached to the Dominican Constabulary, Policia Nacional Dominicana, and served as an instructor until October 1923. Following his return, Howard was attached to the Paymaster's Department and served as assistant paymaster in the Philadelphia Office. He remained in that capacity until October 1924, when he was ordered to the Marine Corps Schools, Quantico for Field Officers Course from which he graduated the following spring.

Upon the completion of the course, Howard sailed for Panama Canal Zone, where he served with the Marine barracks at Submarine Base Coco Solo until December 1928. He was subsequently attached to the Headquarters Marine Corps in Washington, D.C., and promoted to the rank of major in June 1929.

Howard was ordered to the Army Command and General Staff School at Fort Leavenworth, Kansas, in August 1932 and graduated in May of the following year. He was then ordered to the Marine Corps Schools, Quantico and served as an instructor until the June 1935, when he was ordered to the Naval War College in Newport, Rhode Island.

He was meanwhile promoted to the rank of lieutenant colonel in March 1935 and graduated from the Senior Course in June 1936. He then returned to the Headquarters Marine Corps in Washington, D.C. and was attached to the special board, headed by lieutenant colonel Keller E. Rockey to revise the Tentative Landing Operations Manual, which was later published as Landing Operations Doctrine.

During May 1937, Howard was transferred to the staff of United States Naval Academy at Annapolis, Maryland, as the senior Marine officer in the Naval Training Squadron, the summer training sessions for the Naval Academy. He was later appointed Atlantic Squadron officer under Rear Admiral Alfred Wilkinson Johnson and took part in the patrol cruises in the Atlantic Ocean aboard battleship USS New York.

In December 1938, Howard was selected by Commandant of the Marine Corps, Thomas Holcomb, for the capacity of Assistant Commandant of the Marine Corps Schools, Quantico and subsequently relieved on admiral Johnson's staff by Major Benjamin W. Gally. Howard served as deputy to brigadier generals James T. Buttrick and Philip H. Torrey and ultimately was appointed commandant of the schools in January 1941. He was meanwhile promoted to the rank of colonel in April 1940.

== World War II ==
Howard served in that capacity until May 1941 and then joined 2nd Marine Division under Major General Clayton B. Vogel at San Diego as Divisional Chief of Staff. He became Vogel's protégé and followed him to the staff of 2nd Joint Training Force and subsequently to I Marine Amphibious Corps as chief of staff. Howard was promoted to the rank of brigadier general in August 1942 and sailed to the Pacific area in October of that year.

He was stationed at Noumea, New Caledonia, and was co-responsible for the administrative matters for all Marine forces in Southwest Pacific area, including all logistical and personnel matters affecting combat operations. General Vogel did not meet expectation of Commandant Holcomb and was relieved by general Alexander Vandegrift in July 1943. Vandegrift brought his own personnel to the staff of I Marine Amphibious Corps and Howard was succeeded by Gerald C. Thomas.

Unlike Vogel, Howard remained in Pacific area and was appointed Island Commander at Guadalcanal and New Georgia. He held this assignment until May 1944 and distinguished himself in this capacity. Howard was subsequently decorated with Army Distinguished Service Medal. His official citation reads:

The President of the United States of America, authorized by Act of Congress July 9, 1918, takes pleasure in presenting the Army Distinguished Service Medal to Brigadier General Archie Franklin Howard, United States Marine Corps, for exceptionally meritorious and distinguished services to the Government of the United States, in a duty of great responsibility from 31 July 1943 to 12 May 1944, as Island Commander at Guadalcanal and later at New Georgia, Solomon Islands. General Howard demonstrated an impressive talent for exercising command under the principles of unified command, using on his staff officers of Army, Navy and Marine Corps organizations stationed on the Island. He obtained their complete loyalty and confidence and promoted an exceptionally high standard of efficiency. Particularly at Guadalcanal, General Howard's duties involved unusually difficult and complex command and logistical problems and it was through his resourcefulness, perseverance and industrious manner that an efficient, consistently dependable system was developed. In both assignments, General Howard displayed tactical and administrative ability of the highest degree and was conspicuously successful in welding all Services at these important military bases into smooth-functioning commands.

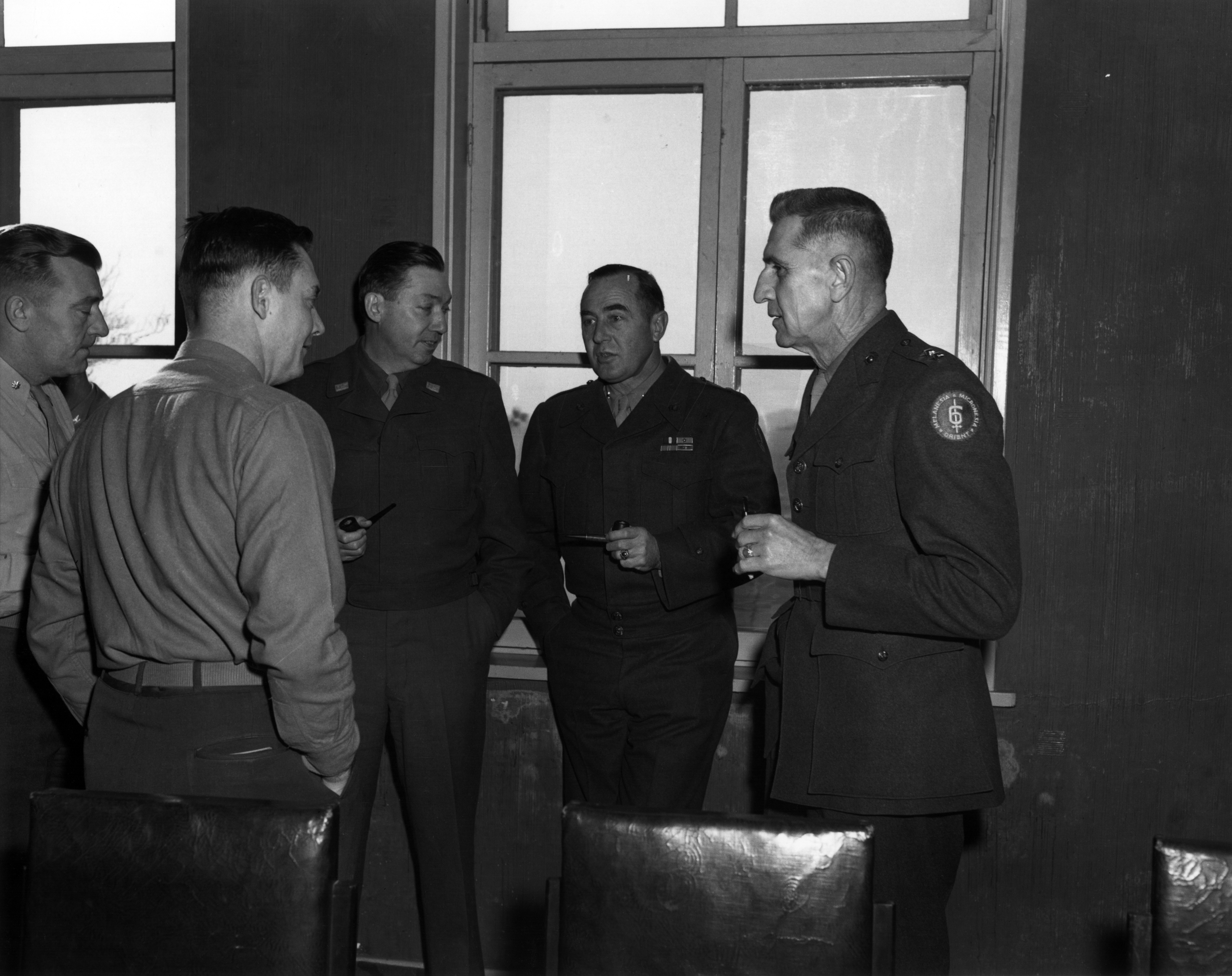
Howard (right) and 6th Marine Division staff in China, January 1946.

He was ordered back to the United States in June 1944 and assumed command of the Marine Corps Base San Diego as substitute for retiring Brigadier General Matthew H. Kingman. Howard was responsible for the recruit training of replacements for the units in Pacific area until June 1945. He was then ordered to Hawaii and appointed inspector general, Fleet Marine Force, Pacific under Lieutenant General Roy S. Geiger. For his new assignment, Howard was promoted to the rank of major general on July 26, 1945.

Howard was ordered to China in December 1945, and replaced Major General Lemuel C. Shepherd Jr. as commanding general, 6th Marine Division. His new unit was located in Qingdao area and was tasked with the repatriation of Japanese prisoners-of-war and refugees back to their country. The situation was complicated by the fact of the ongoing Chinese Civil War during which Kuomintang forces were attacked by Chinese communist guerrillas.

The 6th Marine Division handed its responsibilities to 8th Chinese National Army at the beginning of March 1946 and was deactivated in accord with an established post-war Marine schedule on March 31. Its staff and several units formed 3rd Marine Brigade under Howard's command.

General Howard was ordered back to the United States in June of that year and detached from duty at San Diego and ordered home to be relieved from active duty. He retired from the Marine Corps on November 1, 1946, after 31 years of commissioned service.

== Retirement ==
Howard settled in San Diego and was active with the San Diego Chapter of the Naval Academy Alumni Association. He suffered a huge loss, when his beloved wife, Dorothy, died during the crash of United Airlines Flight 608 in Bryce Canyon, Utah on October 24, 1947. Howard moved to his daughter Mary's house at the El Cordova Hotel in Coronado, California.

Major General Archie F. Howard died on June 24, 1964, in Naval Hospital, San Diego, and is buried with his wife at Fort Rosecrans National Cemetery.

== Decorations ==
Here is the ribbon bar of Major General Archie F. Howard:

1st Row	Army Distinguished Service Medal		World War I Victory Medal with Siberia clasp
2nd Row	Marine Corps Expeditionary Medal	American Defense Service Medal	Asiatic-Pacific Campaign Medal with one service star
3rd Row	American Campaign Medal	World War II Victory Medal	China Service Medal

== See also ==
- 6th Marine Division (United States)

Military offices
Preceded by Lemuel C. Shepherd Jr.	Commanding General, 6th Marine Division; December 24, 1945 - March 31, 1946	Succeeded by Unit deactivated
Preceded by Matthew H. Kingman	Commanding General, Marine Corps Base San Diego; August 9, 1944 - June 12, 1945	Succeeded by Earl C. Long
Preceded by Philip H. Torrey	Commandant, Marine Corps Schools, Quantico; January 1941 - May 1941	Succeeded by Samuel M. Harrington
