= Littleton W. T. Waller Jr. =

U.S. Marine Corps Major General

Littleton Waller Tazewell Waller, Jr.
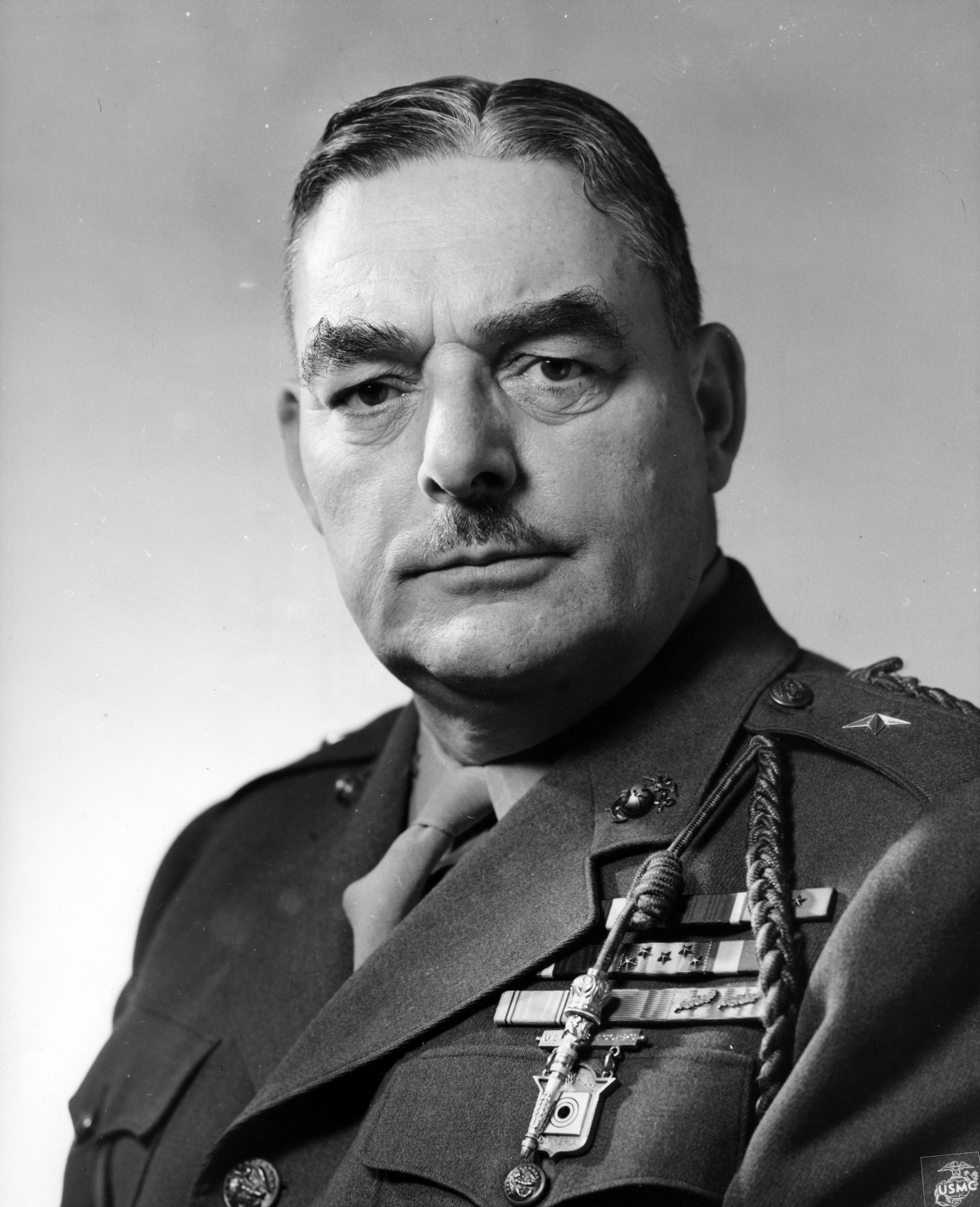
- Born: September 18, 1886; Norfolk, Virginia, US
- Died: April 14, 1967 (aged 80); Willow Grove, Pennsylvania, US
- Relatives: MajGen Littleton Waller, USMC (Father); RADM John B. W. Waller, USN (Brother); BGen Henry T. Waller, USMC (Brother); BGen James D. Waller, USMC (Cousin)
- Military career
- Allegiance: United States of America
- Branch: United States Marine Corps
- Service years: 1907–1921, 1941–1946
- Rank: Major general
- Service number: 0–1034
- Commands: Director of Personnel of USMC; 6th Machine Gun Battalion
- Conflicts: Veracruz Expedition World War I: Battle of Belleau Wood; Battle of Soissons; Battle of Saint-Mihiel; Battle of Blanc Mont Ridge; Meuse-Argonne Offensive; World War II: Pacific War
- Awards: Navy Cross; Silver Star; Legion of Merit; Purple Heart

Littleton Waller Tazewell Waller, Jr. (September 18, 1886 – April 14, 1967) was a highly decorated officer of the United States Marine Corps who attained the rank of major general while serving as Marine Corps Director of Personnel during World War II.

He was the son of Marine Corps Major General Littleton "Tony" Waller.

== Early years ==
Waller was born on September 18, 1886, in Norfolk, Virginia, the son of Marine Corps Major General Littleton "Tony" Waller and his wife Clara Wynn Waller (1862–1958). The oldest of three children, his two brothers were Rear Admiral John B. W. Waller and Marine Corps Brigadier General Henry T. Waller. His cousin, James D. Waller was also Marine officer, who served during World War II and retired as brigadier general.

Littleton Jr. was commissioned a second lieutenant in the Marine Corps in October 1907 and first served with the Marine detachment in the Panama Canal Zone. He was subsequently sent to Beijing, China, where he served as a member of the American Legation Guard. After his return to the United States, he was assigned to the Marine barracks in Norfolk, Virginia, and promoted to the rank of first lieutenant in 1911. At the barracks, he mostly worked on target practice instruction.

In 1914 he was sent to Veracruz, Mexico, as a member of the First Marine Brigade. During this time, he was under the command of his father. Following his service in Mexico, Waller Jr. was transferred to the battleship USS "Michigan", where he was appointed commander of the Marine detachment in 1915. One year later, he was promoted to the rank of captain.

== World War I ==
The United States entered World War I in April 1917. Waller Jr. received a temporary promotion to the rank of major and was assigned to the 1st Machine Gun Battalion as a company commander. Waller sailed to France in December 1917 as a member of the Machine Gun Battalion of the 4th Marine Brigade, 2nd Division.

After a short period of service with the 3rd Division, he was appointed 2nd Division Machine Gun Officer. In this capacity, Waller distinguished himself during the Battle of Belleau Wood and Battle of Soissons, when the units under his command helped support successful infantry attacks.

For his leadership during these battles, Waller was decorated with the Navy Cross. He remained in command of the 6th Machine Gun Battalion and was decorated with the Silver Star for heroism in action during the Meuse-Argonne Offensive. He was seriously wounded and was succeeded by Major Matthew H. Kingman. After recovering, Waller was assigned to the general staff of the 2nd Division, where he served as Division Machine Gun Officer for the rest of the war. He subsequently participated in occupation duties in Germany until 1919.

The Government of France decorated Waller with the Légion d'honneur, Croix de guerre 1914–1918 with Palm and the Fourragère.

== Later career and World War II ==
As a skilled marksman, Waller was active in the Olympic rifle and pistol teams. He retired from the Marine Corps in 1921 to take care of his disabled father, however, he remained in the Marine Corps Reserve and was promoted to lieutenant colonel in November 1934. He served as president of the National Rifle Association of America from 1939 to 1940.

Waller was recalled to active duty in June 1941 as officer in charge of target practice at Marine Corps Headquarters, Washington, D.C. He was promoted to the rank of colonel in January 1942. Almost one year later, Waller was promoted to the rank of brigadier general and appointed director of Marine Corps personnel.

He remained in this capacity until September 1944, when he was transferred to the Pacific Theater, where he was appointed commanding general of the Marine defense on Johnston and Midway Atolls. He was also responsible for defending the naval bases in the Hawaiian Islands, where he was commander of the Marine garrison force of the 14th Naval District. He was awarded the Legion of Merit for his service.

Waller retired from the Marine Corps in 1946 and was advanced to the rank of major general on the retired list because of having been specially commended in combat.

Following his retirement, Waller was the owner of two Philadelphia automobile dealerships.

He died on April 14, 1967, at Abington Memorial Hospital in Willow Grove, Pennsylvania.

He is buried at All Saints Episcopal Church Cemetery in Torresdale, Philadelphia.

== Decorations ==
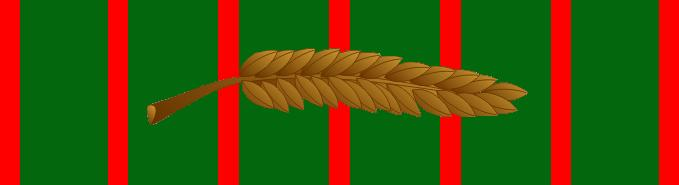

1st Row	Navy Cross		Silver Star		French Fourragère
2nd Row	Legion of Merit	Purple Heart	Marine Corps Expeditionary Medal with two service stars	Mexican Service Medal	French Fourragère
3rd Row	World War I Victory Medal with five battle clasps	Army of Occupation of Germany Medal	American Defense Service Medal	American Campaign Medal	French Fourragère
4th Row	Asiatic-Pacific Campaign Medal with one service star	World War II Victory Medal	Chevalier of the Légion d'honneur	French Croix de guerre 1914–1918 with palm	French Fourragère

General Waller also received the Distinguished Marksmanship Badge.

National Rifle Association of America
Preceded by Gustavus D. Pope	President of the NRA; 1941	Succeeded by Nathaniel C. Nash
