= Philip H. Torrey =

U.S. Marine Corps Major General

Philip Huston Torrey
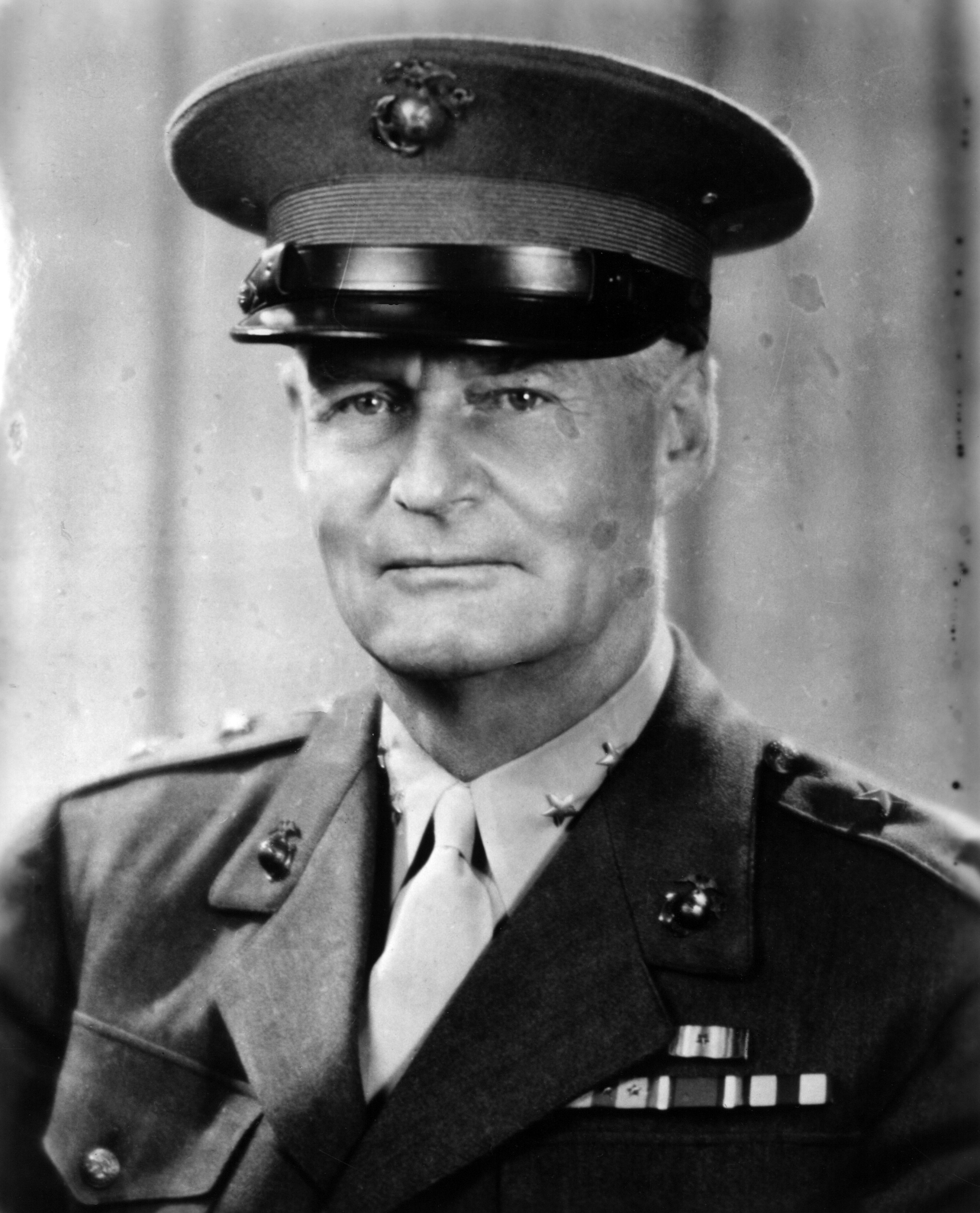
- Major General Philip H. Torrey, USMC
- Born: July 18, 1884; Fort Douglas, Utah, US
- Died: June 7, 1968 (aged 83); San Diego, California, US
- Burial place: Fort Rosecrans National Cemetery
- Military career
- Allegiance: United States
- Branch: United States Marine Corps
- Service years: 1905–1946
- Rank: Major general
- Commands: Marine Corps Base Quantico; Marine Corps Reserve; 1st Marine Division; 6th Marine Regiment
- Conflicts: Cuban Pacification; Veracruz Expedition; World War I Haitian Campaign; World War II

Philip Huston Torrey (July 18, 1884 – June 7, 1968) was an officer of the United States Marine Corps with the rank of major general, who is most noted for his service as commanding general of Marine Corps Base Quantico during World War II. He was responsible for the training of officers at Quantico who subsequently sailed to the Pacific theater.

== Early career ==
Philip H. Torrey was born on July 18, 1884, at Fort Douglas, Utah, as the son of Zerah Watkins and Anna Torrey. His father, West Point graduate, served as Army lieutenant colonel there and young Philip and his two younger brothers, Daniel and Henry, were influenced by his service. Upon the completion of the high school, Philip attended the Lehigh University for one year and transferred to the University of Montana in Missoula.

He graduated in summer 1905 and entered the Marine Corps service on July 18 as newly commissioned second lieutenant. His both brothers also entered the military service later, Daniel was appointed to the Military Academy at West Point and Henry entered the Marine Corps service as Philip did. Following his commissioning, Torrey was ordered to the School of Application for basic officer training, which he completed in September 1906.

His first assignment took him with the 1st Provisional Brigade of Marines to Cuba, where he participated in the suppression of armed revolt of independence war veterans who defeated the meager government forces. Torrey remained in Cuba until the beginning of January 1909 and sailed back to the United States as first lieutenant (promoted in May 1908). He was then attached as an instructor to the Marine Officer School at Port Royal, South Carolina, and remained there until March 1911, when he returned to Cuba in order to protect "American lives and property" at Guantánamo Bay.

Torrey returned to the United States in August 1912 and assumed duty with Naval Disciplinary Barracks at Port Royal, South Carolina. This duty includes guarding and administering of the naval and marine prisoners, who were sentenced to no more than three years confinement for non-violent crimes. He served in this capacity until April 1914, when he was attached to the Marine detachment aboard the newly commissioned battleship USS New York and participated in the Veracruz Expedition during the ongoing Mexican Revolution.

After U.S. Army assumed control of Veracruz, the USS New York resumed her shakedown cruise along the East Coast of the United States and Torrey served with that ship until April 1916. He then served with the Marine barracks at Norfolk Navy Yard and was promoted to the rank of captain in August 1916. Torrey was promoted to the rank of major in May 1917 and transferred to the Marine Corps Base Quantico two months later for duty as an instructor of newly commissioned officers.

Torrey served in this capacity for the duration of World War I and was founding officer of Marine Infantry School. He was attached to the 1st Marine Brigade under Brigadier General John H. Russell Jr. and ordered to Haiti in order to participate in the military operations against hostile Cacos bandits.

Upon his return to the States in August 1922, Torrey served at Headquarters Marine Corps until June 1926, when he was appointed commanding officer of Marine Barracks at United States Naval Academy at Annapolis, Maryland.

He was subsequently ordered back to Haiti and attached to the staff of American High Commissioner, his old superior – John H. Russell. Torrey spent next five years in that country and finally returned to the United States in August 1931. He was promoted to the rank of lieutenant colonel on September 1 of that year and ordered to the Field Officers Course at Marine Corps Schools, Quantico where he graduated one year later.

Torrey was ordered for the junior course at the Naval War College at Newport, Rhode Island, in May 1934 and also graduated one year later. He was subsequently promoted to the rank of colonel and appointed commanding officer of Marine Barracks at Puget Sound Navy Yard. Torrey was transferred to the Marine Corps Base San Diego and assumed command of 6th Marine Regiment. He was ordered back to the Naval War College in June 1937 and graduated from the Senior course in May 1938.

== World War II ==
Upon his graduation, Torrey was ordered to Philadelphia and relieved Colonel Benjamin S. Berry as director of Eastern Recruiting Division. He held this assignment until the beginning of July 1939, when he was appointed commandant of the Marine Corps Schools, Quantico. In this capacity, he was responsible for the training of Marine officers at the Basic School, Officer Candidates School, Amphibious Warfare School and other facilities there. For this new assignment, Torrey was promoted to the rank of brigadier general in August of that year.

He remained in that capacity until the end of January 1941, when he was attached to the newly created 1st Marine Division as assistant division commander and deputy to Holland Smith. Torrey was given command of the division in June 1941 and also received temporary promotion to the rank of major general at that time.

At the beginning of August 1941, Torrey and his division participated in the amphibious exercise at Onslow Beach, North Carolina. The exercise did not go well, because of the problems with landing boats and Torrey's superior, general Holland Smith, became suspicious about Torrey's ability to command combat division. Smith also pointed out on the lack of sufficient ground warfare training and Commandant Thomas Holcomb assigned perspective brigadier general Alexander Vandegrift as assistant division commander in order to assume responsibility for the division's training.

Most of the Division's staff members criticized the influence of divisional supply officer, George E. Monson, over Torrey and when the talented, outspoken commander of 11th Marine Artillery Regiment, Pedro del Valle got into a dispute with Monson over alleged discrimination against artillery in matters of housing, equipment, messing facilities and transportation, another problem within the division's command structure was born.

Colonel del Valle exchanged heated words with Torrey about the commanding general's role at a regimental review and Torrey requested replacement for Del Valle. Lieutenant Colonel Monson then encouraged Torrey to press Headquarters to investigate citizen reports that indiscreet "Puerto Rican aristocrat" (del Valle had Puerto Rican ancestry) had made disparaging remarks about President Franklin D. Roosevelt and American policy toward Fascist Italy. Commandant Holcomb sent an investigator, who cleared Colonel del Valle, but also discovered that Torrey, an ardent Irish-American, had made similar remarks about Roosevelt's pro-British sympathies.

This was the last impulse to Torrey's superior, general Holland Smith, who pressed Commandant Holcomb to replace Torrey. General Torrey was relieved by his deputy, General Vandegrift, at the end of March 1942 and ordered to the Headquarters Marine Corps in Washington, D.C., for further orders. He succeeded Ralph S. Keyser as director of Marine Corps Reserve in April of that year and remained in that capacity until the end of September, when he was appointed commanding general, Marine Corps Base Quantico.

Torrey remained in this capacity for the duration of the war and was responsible for the training of officers at Quantico who subsequently sailed to the Pacific theater. Also the system of Marine Corps Schools, Quantico which included the Basic School, Officer Candidates School, Amphibious Warfare School and other facilities there, was under his responsibility.

== Retirement ==
General Torrey was succeeded by Major General Clifton B. Cates at the end of May 1946 and retired one month later after 41 years of active service. He settled in La Jolla, California, with his wife, Elizabeth and died in San Diego on June 7, 1968. Major General Torrey is buried at Fort Rosecrans National Cemetery.

They had one son Philip Jr., who graduated from the United States Naval Academy in 1934 and served as Naval aviator in Pacific theater during World War II. He reached the rank of lieutenant commander in the United States Navy and was decorated with the Navy Cross, three Distinguished Flying Crosses and four Air Medals. Torrey Jr. was shot down over Tokyo in February 1945 and posthumously promoted to the rank of commander and also two daughters, Elizabeth (1910–1980) and Rebecca (1919–2002) married Naval aviator and late marine colonel Neil R. MacIntyre.

== Decorations ==
Major General Torrey's ribbon bar:

1st Row	Marine Corps Expeditionary Medal with three stars		
2nd Row	Cuban Pacification Medal	Mexican Service Medal	World War I Victory Medal with one battle clasp
3rd Row	American Defense Service Medal	American Campaign Medal	World War II Victory Medal

Military offices
Preceded by Holland Smith	Commanding General of the Marine Corps Base Quantico; October 2, 1942 – May 31, 1946	Succeeded by Clifton B. Cates
Preceded by Ralph S. Keyser	Director of the Marine Corps Reserve; April 16, 1942 - September 30, 1942	Succeeded by Littleton W. T. Waller Jr.
Preceded by Holland Smith	Commanding General of the 1st Marine Division; June 14, 1941 - March 22, 1942	Succeeded by Alexander Vandegrift
Preceded by James T. Buttrick	Commandant of the Marine Corps Schools, Quantico; July 10, 1939 - January 30, 1941	Succeeded by Archie F. Howard
