= Stimson Joseph Brown =

American astronomer

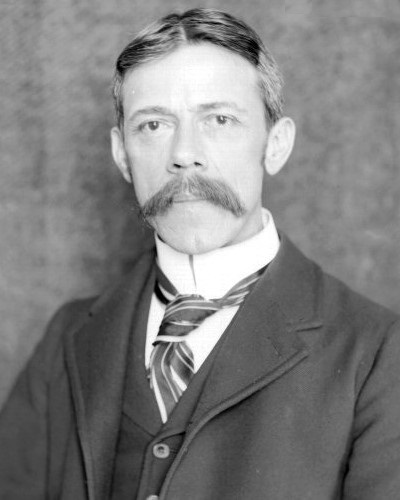
- Born: September 17, 1854; Penn Yan, New York
- Died: December 20, 1923 (aged 69); Nice, France
- Burial place: Arlington National Cemetery
- Military career
- Allegiance: United States of America
- Branch: United States Navy
- Service years: 1876–1918
- Rank: Commodore
- Commands: Director of the United States Naval Observatory

Stimson Joseph Brown (September 17, 1854 – December 20, 1923) was an American astronomer and naval officer with the rank of commodore. He served as Director of the United States Naval Observatory.

== Biography ==
Brown was born at Penn Yan, N.Y. He was educated at Cornell University (1871–1872) and at the United States Naval Academy, where he graduated first of forty-two in the Class of 1876. Brown served on the United States Coast and Geodetic Survey, became professor of mathematics (USN) in 1883, and astronomical director of the United States Naval Observatory in 1898. On August 25, 1900, he was promoted to captain. Having been on duty in the U.S. Naval Academy since 1901, in 1907 he became the head of the department of mathematics and mechanics. Brown was the author of Practical Algebra (1908, 1910) and Analytical Geometry and Curve Tracing (1907; revised edition, 1912), texts for the use of midshipmen. On September 17, 1918, having reached the mandatory retirement age of sixty-four, he was promoted to commodore and retired from active duty.

== Personal ==
On November 18, 1878, Brown married Alice Graham. They had three daughters, one of whom married U.S. Navy officer Edward C. Kalbfus. Another daughter was the first wife of U.S. Marine Corps officer Maurice E. Shearer. After his first wife's death in 1912, Brown married Elizabeth Sharp Pettit, the widow of a U.S. Army officer, on November 12, 1913.

After retirement, Brown lived in Washington, D.C. He died in Nice while on vacation in France with his second wife and was interred in Section 2 of Arlington National Cemetery beside his first wife.
