= Alexander Vandegrift =

USMC Medal of Honor recipient (1887–1973)

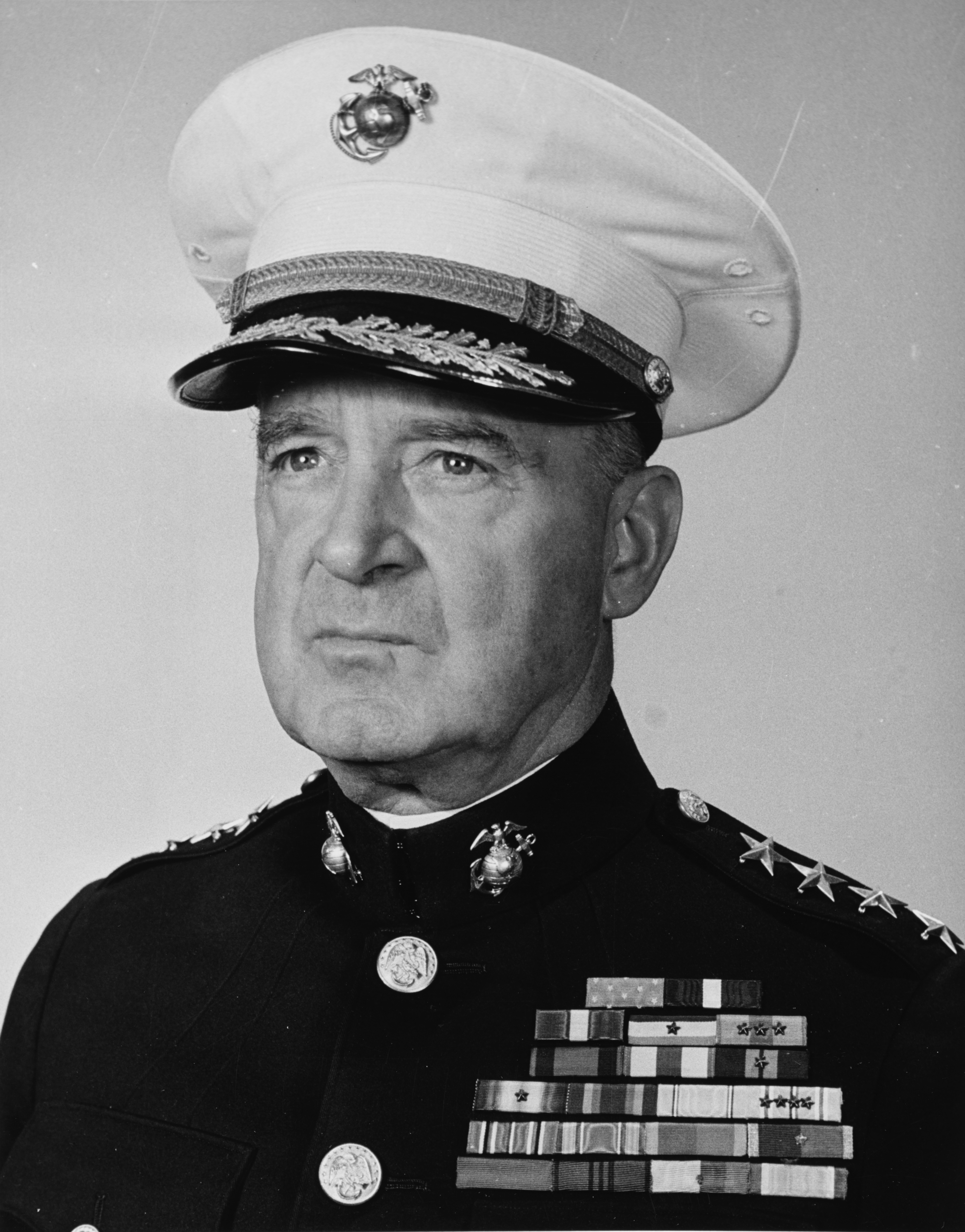
- 18th Commandant of the Marine Corps (1944–1947)
- Born: Alexander Archer Vandegrift; March 13, 1887; Charlottesville, Virginia, U.S.
- Died: May 8, 1973 (aged 86); Bethesda, Maryland, U.S.
- Burial place: Arlington National Cemetery
- Spouses: Mildred Strode (m. 1909-1952); Kathryn Henson (m. 1953)
- Children: Col. Alexander Vandegrift, Jr.
- Military career
- Allegiance: United States
- Branch: United States Marine Corps
- Service years: 1909–1949 (40 years)
- Rank: General
- Nickname: Archie
- Commands: Commandant of the Marine Corps; I Marine Amphibious Corps; 1st Marine Division
- Conflicts: Banana Wars; Occupation of Veracruz; Nicaraguan Intervention; Haitian Intervention; World War I; Chinese Civil War; World War II; Battle of Guadalcanal; Battle of Bougainville
- Awards: Medal of Honor; Navy Cross; Navy Distinguished Service Medal; Knight Commander of the Order of the British Empire (United Kingdom); Companion of the Order of the Bath (United Kingdom); Knight Grand Cross of the Order of Orange-Nassau (Netherlands); Grand Officer of the Legion of Honour (France)

Alexander Archer Vandegrift (March 13, 1887 – May 8, 1973) was a highly decorated United States Marine Corps four-star general, Medal of Honor recipient, and a Commandant of the Marine Corps. During World War II, he commanded the 1st Marine Division to victory in its first ground offensive of the war, the Battle of Guadalcanal. For his actions on August 7, 1942 in the Solomon Islands, he was awarded the Navy Cross; and, for his actions from August 7 to December 9, 1942, during the Solomon Islands campaign, he received the Medal of Honor. From January 1, 1944 to December 31, 1947, Vandegrift served as the 18th Commandant of the Marine Corps, becoming the first active-duty U.S. Marine to be promoted four-star general in April 1945.

Later in Vandegrift's tenure as Commandant of the Marine Corps, the U.S. Marines became caught up in a political struggle as the U.S. Army, U.S. Navy, and U.S. Army Air Forces fought over roles and responsibilities in the aftermath of World War II. Proponents of disbanding the Marines in favor of the U.S. Army absorbing their mission and specialties included President Harry S. Truman and General Dwight D. Eisenhower. On May 6, 1946, Vandegrift appeared before the Senate Committee on Naval Affairs to make what became known as the "Bended Knee Speech," arguing that a dedicated marine service cannot be replaced by a conventional army. His testimony was successful in swaying enough members of the U.S. Congress, and subsequently the idea of disbanding the U.S. Marine Corps was dropped.

Vandegrift retired from active duty on April 1, 1949, by which time he had been in the Marines for 40 years. In his retirement, Vandegrift prepared and published his memoirs, Once A Marine, in 1964. He died in 1973 at the age of 85, and was buried in Arlington National Cemetery.

== Early life and education ==
Alexander Archer Vandegrift was born on March 13, 1887, in Charlottesville, Virginia, where his father was an architect and contractor. Vandegrift was of Dutch ancestry, all of which had been in North America since the 1600s. It was once facetiously remarked that he "never had a Catholic ancestor." The young Vandegrift, known as "Archer" in his boyhood, had an interest in the military both from reading military history novels and from stories of ancestors who fought in various wars. He graduated from Charlottesville High School. During his childhood, he read G.A. Henty novels and history. In particular, he read extensively about the Battle of Trafalgar and the Battle of Waterloo, and described himself as a "big fan" of Arthur Wellesley, 1st Duke of Wellington and Horatio Nelson.

He attended the University of Virginia from 1906 to 1908. He left (without a degree) after two years to accept his commission into the Marine Corps.

== Career ==
Vandegrift received his commission in the U.S. Marine Corps through a week-long competitive examination in 1908. He was formally commissioned as a second lieutenant on January 22, 1909.

At the Marine Corps Schools in 1909, he wrote a prophetic article, "Aviation, the Cavalry of the Future." As commandant, he was appointed to the Hogaboom Board, named for then-Major General Hogaboom, which began the Marines' development of vertical envelopment, the use of helicopters for air assault.

During his early years in the Marine Corps, as a second lieutenant, Vandegrift was very nearly dismissed from the Marine Corps for disciplinary infractions and negative evaluations. In his first Marine Corps evaluation, dated June 30, 1909, Vandegrift received an overall rating of "Not Good" with these remarks from the Commander of the Marine Officers School:

This officer has not shown that he appreciates the responsibilities of his position as an officer, and unless there is a decisive improvement, his relations will not be to the advantage of the service.

In Vandegrift's next evaluation, in December 1909, he received a "Good and Tolerable" rating. The next was rated as "Excellent" upon reporting to the Marine Corps Barracks, Navy Yard, Portsmouth, New Hampshire, in 1910.

=== Banana Wars ===
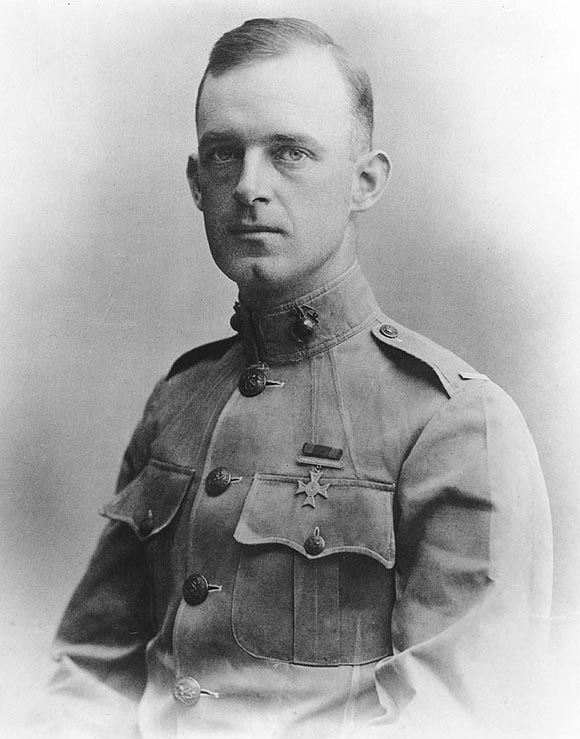
Vandegrift as a first lieutenant, around 1915

Following instruction at the Marine Officers' School at Port Royal, South Carolina, his first tour of duty was at the Marine Barracks at Portsmouth, New Hampshire. In 1912, he went to foreign shore duty in the Caribbean, first to Cuba and then to Nicaragua, where he participated in the bombardment, assault, and capture of Coyotepe Fortress. In 1914, he participated in the engagement and occupation of Veracruz, Mexico.

In December 1914, after his promotion to first lieutenant, he attended the Advance Base Course at the Marine Barracks, Philadelphia. Upon completion of training, he sailed for Haiti with the 1st Marines Regiment and participated in action against Cacos bandits at Le Trou and Fort Capois, Haiti.

In August 1916, he was promoted to captain and became a member of the Haitian Constabulary at Port-au-Prince, where he remained until he was detached to the United States in December 1918. He returned to Haiti again in July 1919, to serve with the Gendarmerie d'Haiti as an Inspector of Constabulary. He was promoted to major in June 1920.

=== 1920s – 1930s ===
Major Vandegrift returned to the U.S. in April 1923 and was assigned to the Marine Barracks, Marine Corps Base Quantico, Virginia. He completed the Field Officers' Course, Marine Corps Schools, in May 1926. He was then transferred to the Marine Corps Base San Diego, California, as assistant chief of staff.

In February 1927, he sailed for China, where he served as operations and training officer of the 3rd Marines with headquarters at Tianjin. He was ordered to Washington, D.C., in September 1928, where he became assistant chief coordinator, Bureau of the Budget.

After his duty in Washington, he joined the Marine Barracks, Quantico, where he became assistant chief of staff, G-1 Section, Fleet Marine Force (FMF). During that assignment, in June 1934, he was promoted to lieutenant colonel.

Ordered to China in June 1935, Lieutenant Colonel Vandegrift served successively as executive officer and commanding officer of the Marine detachment at the American embassy in Beiping. Promoted to colonel in September 1936, Vandegrift reported to Headquarters Marine Corps (HQMC), Washington, D.C., in June 1937, where he became Military Secretary to the Major General Commandant. In March 1940, he was appointed Assistant to the Major General Commandant, and the following month, he was promoted to brigadier general.

=== World War II ===
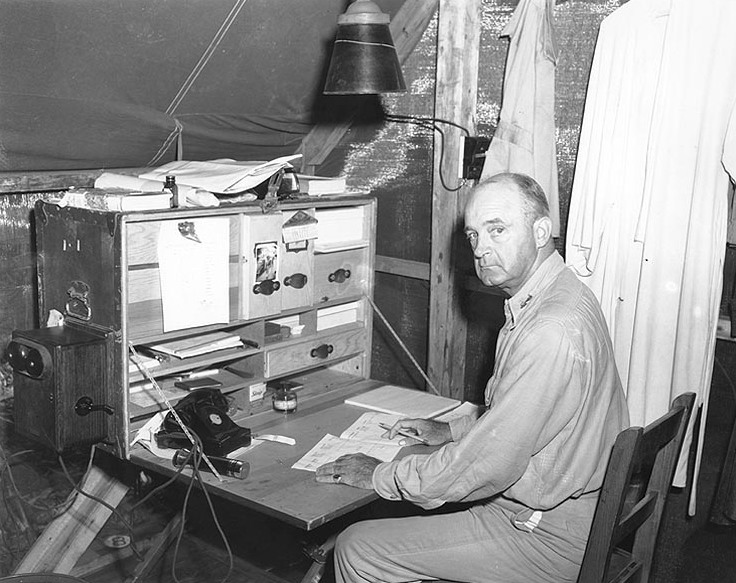
MajGen Vandegrift, 1942, in his command tent on Guadalcanal

As a brigadier general Vandegrift was ordered to the 1st Marine Division in November 1941. Shortly before the U.S. entered World War II, he had become on December 7, the assistant commander of the First Marine Division.

In March and April 1942, Vandegrift was promoted to major general and assumed command of the First Marine Division. In May, the First Marine Division and the South Pacific Amphibious Force sailed for the South Pacific Area. The First Marine Division was the first Marine Corps division that ever left the shores of the United States. On August 7, Vandegrift led the First Marine Division in the first large-scale operation against the Japanese, in the Solomon Islands. He was awarded the Navy Cross "for extraordinary heroism and distinguished devotion to duty as Commanding General of the First Marine Division and all ground troops action with enemy Japanese forces during the attack on the Solomon Islands 7 August 1942." (attack on Guadalcanal, Tulagi, and Gavutu); He was later awarded the Medal of Honor "for outstanding and heroic accomplishment above and beyond the call of duty as Commanding Officer of the First Marine Division in operations against enemy Japanese forces in the Solomon Islands during the period 7 August to 9 December 1942." He had commanded the initial landings and the subsequent occupation ... that "resulted in securing a valuable base for further operations of our forces against the enemy." Vandegrift was presented the Medal of Honor on February 5, 1943, from President Franklin Roosevelt during a ceremony in the White House.

In July 1943, Vandegrift commanded the 1st Marine Amphibious Corps in the landing at Empress Augusta Bay, Bougainville, in the northern Solomon Islands, on November 1, 1943. Upon establishing the initial beachhead, he relinquished command and returned to Washington, D.C., as commandant-designate.

==== Commandant of Marine Corps ====
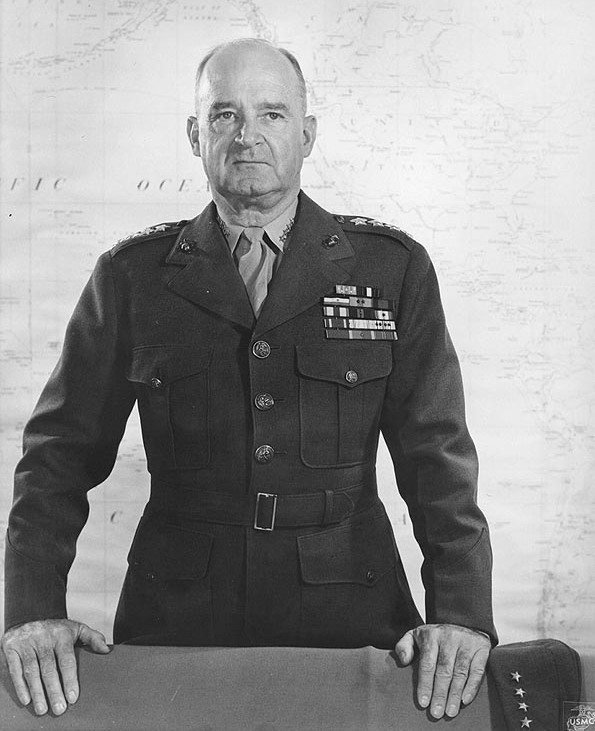
Vandegrift in 1945 as Commandant of the Marine Corps.

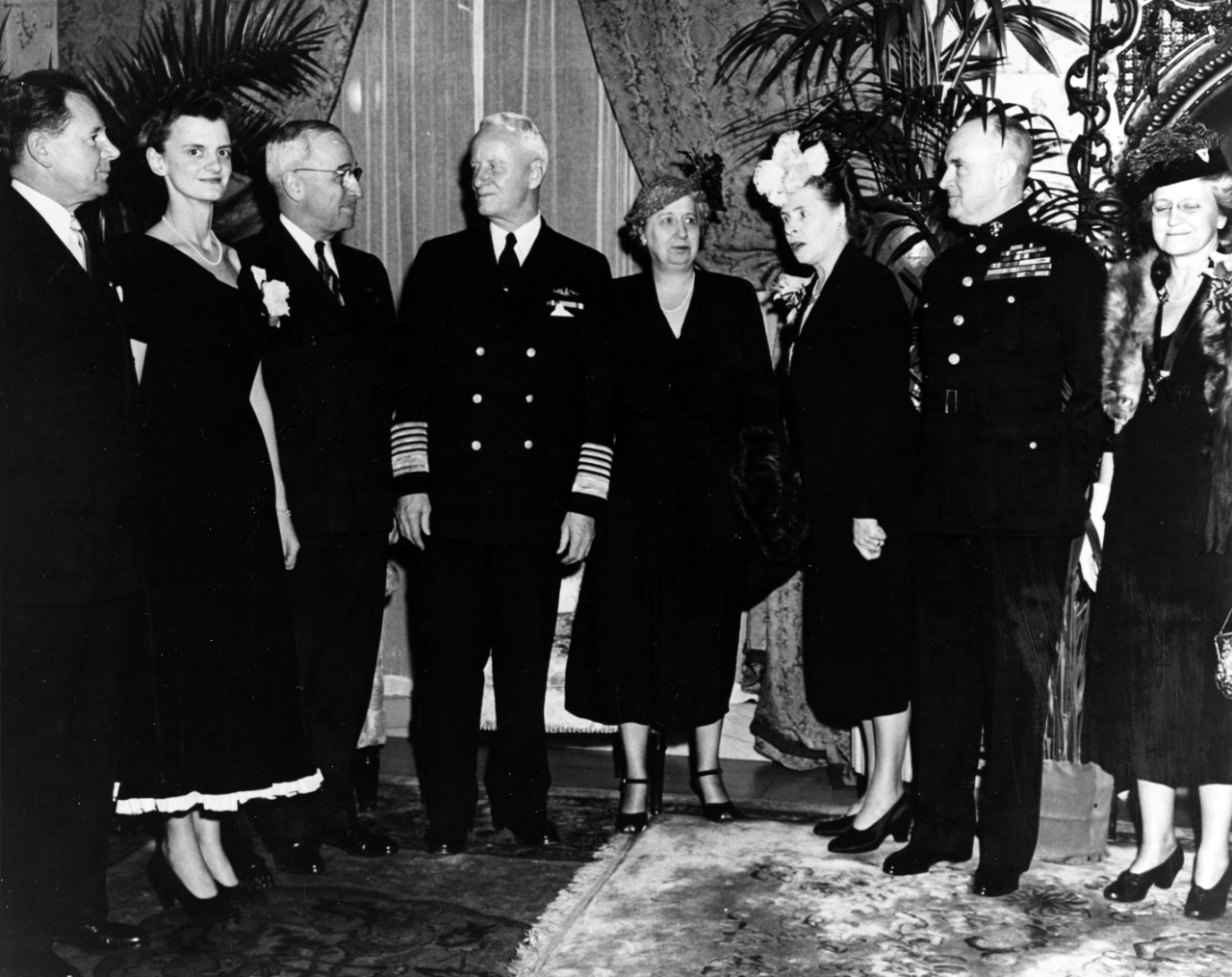
Retirement party for General Vandegrift and Fleet Admiral Nimitz, hosted by SECNAV Sullivan. L to R: SECNAV & Mrs. Sullivan, President Harry S. Truman, Nimitz, Mrs. Truman, Mrs. Nimitz, General & Mrs. Vandegrift

On January 1, 1944, as a lieutenant general, he was sworn in as the 18th commandant of the Marine Corps. On April 4, 1945, he was appointed general, with date of rank from March 21, 1945, the first Marine officer on active duty to attain four-star rank.

During his tenure as commandant, the Marine Corps faced institutional threats from U.S. Army efforts to absorb the mission of the Marines. The U.S. Navy was sympathetic to the Marine Corps's predicament but was ready to accept the diminishment of the Corps in exchange for keeping naval aviation from consolidation with the U.S. Air Force. The post-war discussions on the restructuring of the American defense establishment opened the door to diminishing the mission and role of the Marine Corps in the new defense structure. Proponents of such cuts included President Harry Truman and General Dwight Eisenhower. In that power struggle, the Marine Corps aligned itself with U.S. Congress in warning against the encroachment on civilian oversight within the Army proposals.

To clinch the support of Congress, Commandant Vandegrift delivered the famous "Bended Knee Speech" on May 6, 1946, to the Senate Committee on Naval Affairs and ended it thus:

The Marine Corps, then, believes that it has earned this right—to have its future decided by the legislative body which created it—nothing more. Sentiment is not a valid consideration in determining questions of national security. We have pride in ourselves and in our past, but we do not rest our case on any presumed ground of gratitude owing us from the Nation. The bended knee is not a tradition of our Corps. If the Marine as a fighting man has not made a case for himself after 170 years of service, he must go. But I think you will agree with me that he has earned the right to depart with dignity and honor, not by subjugation to the status of uselessness and servility planned for him by the War Department.

— Alexander Vandegrift, "Bended Knee Speech",

For outstanding service as Commandant of the Marine Corps from January 1, 1944, to June 30, 1946, General Vandegrift was awarded the Navy Distinguished Service Medal. He was relieved as Commandant on December 31, 1947, but was not formally retired and placed on the retired list until April 1, 1949.

== Later life ==
Together with Robert B. Asprey, General Vandegrift co-authored a book chronicling his experiences in World War II. The book is titled Once a Marine: The Memoirs of General A. A. Vandegrift Commandant of the U.S. Marines in WW II, and was published in 1964.

General Vandegrift died on May 8, 1973, at the National Naval Medical Center, Bethesda, Maryland, after a long illness. His interment was on May 10, 1973, at the Arlington National Cemetery.

== Dates of rank ==
| Insignia | Rank | Dates |
|---|---|---|
| No insignia in 1909 | Second lieutenant | January 16, 1909 |
| | First lieutenant | November 10, 1914 |
| | Captain | August 29, 1916 |
| | Major (Temporary for war service) | July 1, 1918 |
| | Captain (Peacetime reversion) | July 31, 1919 |
| | Major | July 4, 1920 (Backdated to June 4, 1920) |
| | Lieutenant colonel | November 15, 1934 (Backdated to May 29, 1934) |
| | Colonel | September 1, 1936 |
| | Brigadier general | April 11, 1940 |
| | Major general | March 20, 1942 |
| | Lieutenant general | July 28, 1943 |
| | General | April 4, 1945 (Backdated to March 21, 1945) |

== Military awards ==
Vandegrift received the following decorations and awards:

| 1st Row | Medal of Honor | Navy Cross | Navy Distinguished Service Medal | Navy Presidential Unit Citation w/ one 3/16" bronze star |
| 2nd Row | Navy Unit Commendation w/ one 3/16" bronze star | Marine Corps Expeditionary Medal w/ three 3/16" bronze stars | Nicaraguan Campaign Medal | Mexican Service Medal |
| 3rd Row | Haitian Campaign Medal w/ one 3/16" bronze star | World War I Victory Medal w/ West Indies clasp & one 3/16" bronze star | Yangtze Service Medal | American Defense Service Medal |
| 4th Row | American Campaign Medal | Asiatic-Pacific Campaign Medal w/ four 3/16" bronze stars | World War II Victory Medal | Knight Grand Cross of the Order of Orange-Nassau w/ swords, Netherlands |
| 5th Row | Order of Abdon Calderon, 1st Class, Ecuador w/ one 3/16" gold star | Knight Commander of the Order of the British Empire, United Kingdom (Honorary) | Grand Officer of the Legion of Honor, France | Companion of the Order of the Bath, United Kingdom (Honorary) |
| 6th Row | Order of Pao Ting (Precious Tripod) w/ Special Cravat, China | Haitian Distinguished Service Medal | Médaille militaire w/ one 3/16" silver star, Haiti | Cruz de Aviación de Primera Clase, Peru |

=== Medal of Honor citation ===
Vandegrift's Medal of Honor citation reads as follows:

The President of the United States takes pleasure in presenting the MEDAL OF HONOR to

MAJOR GENERAL ALEXANDER VANDEGRIFT
UNITED STATES MARINE CORPS

for service as set forth in the following CITATION:

For outstanding and heroic accomplishment above and beyond the call of duty as commanding officer of the 1st Marine Division in operations against enemy Japanese forces in the Solomon Islands during the period from 7 August to 9 December 1942. With the adverse factors of weather, terrain, and disease making his task a difficult and hazardous undertaking, and with his command eventually including sea, land, and air forces of Army, Navy and Marine Corps, Maj. Gen. Vandegrift achieved marked success in commanding the initial landings of the U. S. forces in the Solomon Islands and in their subsequent occupation. His tenacity, courage, and resourcefulness prevailed against a strong, determined, and experienced enemy, and the gallant fighting spirit of the men under his inspiring leadership enabled them to withstand aerial, land, and sea bombardment, to surmount all obstacles, and leave a disorganized and ravaged enemy. This dangerous but vital mission, accomplished at the constant risk of his life, resulted in securing a valuable base for further operations of our forces against the enemy, and its successful completion reflects great credit upon Maj. Gen. Vandegrift, his command, and the U.S. Naval Service.

/S/ Franklin D. Roosevelt

=== Navy Cross citation ===
Citation:

The President of the United States of America takes pleasure in presenting the Navy Cross to Major General Alexander Archer Vandegrift (MCSN: 0-1009), United States Marine Corps, for extraordinary heroism and distinguished devotion to duty as Commander of the FIRST Marine Division and all ground troops in action with enemy Japanese forces during the attack on the Solomon Islands on 7 August 1942. Though subjected to intense enemy opposition, Major General Vandegrift led his command in superbly coordinated operations with the result that all objectives were captured and opposing enemy Japanese forces destroyed. His fine spirit of leadership and his courageous determination throughout the engagement were in keeping with the highest traditions of the United States Naval Service.

== Namesake and other honors ==
General Vandegrift held an honorary degree of Doctor of Military Science from Pennsylvania Military College and honorary degrees of Doctor of Law from Harvard, Colgate, Brown, Columbia, and Maryland Universities and John Marshall College.

The Oliver Hazard Perry-class frigate USS Vandegrift (FFG-48), launched in 1982, was named in his honor. She was sponsored by three of Vandegrift's daughters and his great granddaughter.

The main street that runs through Camp Pendleton is named Vandegrift Boulevard in his honor.

A former military housing complex, now civilian housing, for Wright-Patterson Air Force Base, near Dayton, Ohio, has streets named for World War II commanders including General Vandegrift, General Eisenhower, and Admiral Nimitz.

== Family ==
Vandegrift married Mildred Strode (1886–1952) on June 29, 1909. They had one son, Alexander Archer Vandegrift, Jr. (1911–1969), who graduated from the Virginia Military Institute in 1935 and followed his father into the U.S. Marine Corps, serving in World War II and the Korean War.

After Mildred's death in 1952, Vandegrift married Kathryn Henson (1903–1978) in 1953. Kathryn lived until 1978. Both of Vandegrift's wives are buried with him in Arlington National Cemetery.

== In popular culture ==
Vandegrift was portrayed in the 1960 film The Gallant Hours by Raymond Bailey; the 2006 film Flags of Our Fathers by Chris Bauer; and briefly in episodes 3 and 8 of the 2010 miniseries The Pacific by Stephen Leeder. In addition, Vandegrift appears in the 2004 anime series Zipang.

A fictionalized account of Vandegrift and the U.S. Marines on Guadalcanal is featured in The Corps book series by W.E.B. Griffin.

== See also ==
- List of United States Marine Corps four-star generals
- Pacific theatre
- Solomon Islands campaign

== Notes ==
Military offices
| Preceded by Philip H. Torrey | Commanding General of the 1st Marine Division; 1942–1943 | Succeeded by William H. Rupertus |
| Preceded by Thomas Holcomb | Commandant of the United States Marine Corps; 1943–1947 | Succeeded by Clifton B. Cates |
