= Vierzy =

- Commune
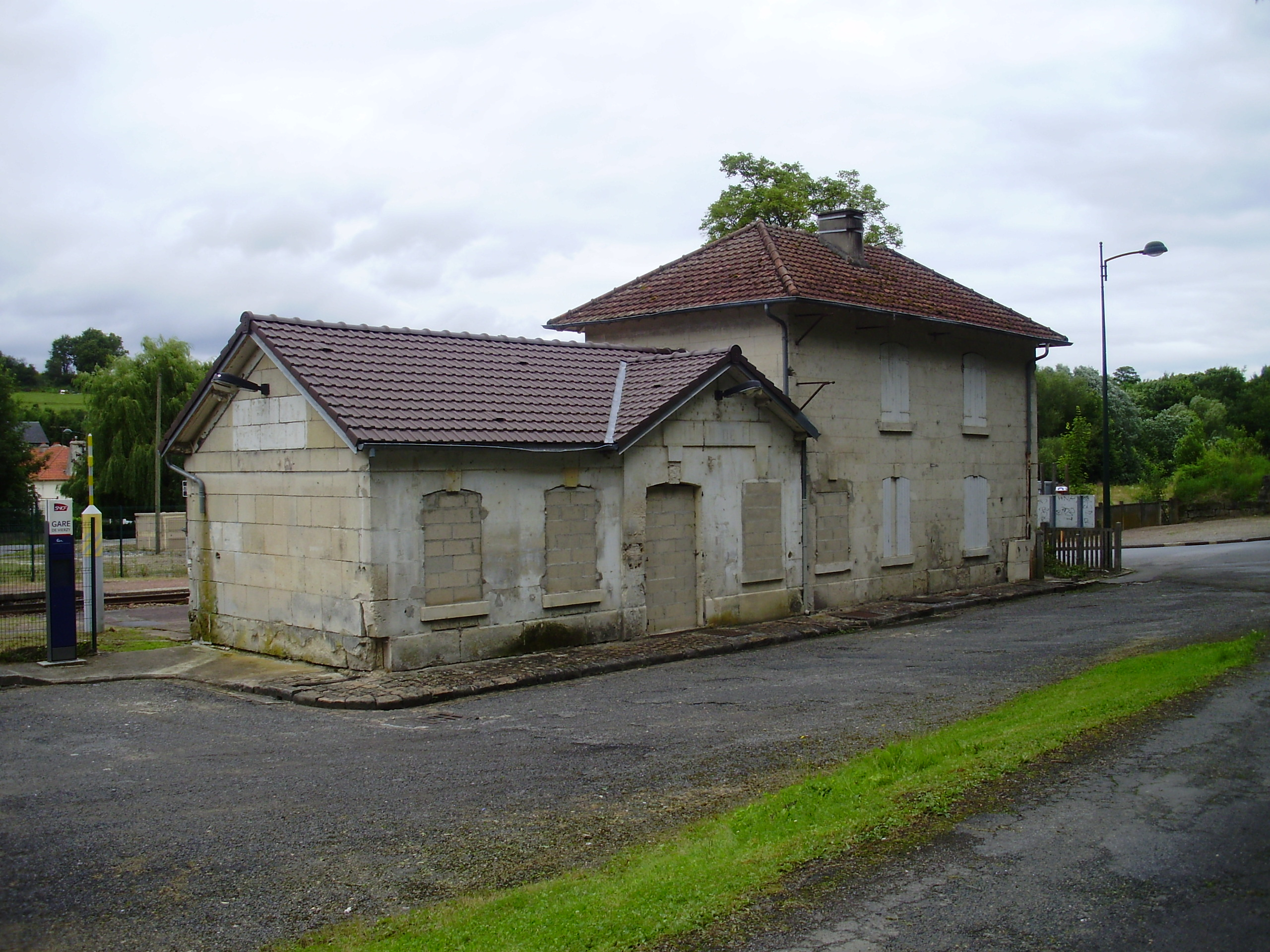
- The railway station of Vierzy
- Location of Vierzy
- Location within France Location within Hauts-de-France
- Coordinates: 49°17′27″N 3°17′10″E
- Country: France
- Region: Hauts-de-France
- Department: Aisne
- Arrondissement: Soissons
- Canton: Villers-Cotterêts
- Intercommunality: Oulchy le Château

Government
  - Mayor (2026–32): Hervé Muzart
- Area^{1}: 12.73 km^{2} (4.92 sq mi)
- Elevation: 100 m (330 ft)
- Highest elevation: 155 m (509 ft)
- Lowest elevation: 86 m (282 ft)
- Population (2023): 384
  - Density: 30.2/km^{2} (78.1/sq mi)
- Time zone: UTC+01:00 (CET)
  - Summer (DST): UTC+02:00 (CEST)
- INSEE/Postal code: 02799 /02210
- ^{1} French Land Register data, which excludes lakes, ponds, glaciers > 1 km^{2} (0.386 sq mi or 247 acres) and river estuaries.

Vierzy (French pronunciation: [vjɛʁzi]) is a commune in the Aisne department in Hauts-de-France in northern France.

== History ==
=== Medieval period ===
The history of Vierzy is associated with the local seigneuries and noble families of the Soissons region. From the 12th century onwards, historical documents mention individuals bearing the name of Vierzy, including Josselin de Vierzy, Bishop of Soissons from 1128 to 1152, who was associated with the foundation of several religious establishments in the region.

A seigneury known as the Fief de la Carrière is documented in 1373. It was held by Collard de Colligis through his wife, Jeanne de la Carrière de Vierzy. During the Hundred Years' War, the estate became associated with Rigault des Fontaines, a military captain who served Charles VII.

=== Architectural heritage ===
The village retains remains of a medieval château, including a fortified gateway, parts of a residential building and the remains of a Gothic gallery. These structures include elements dating from the 15th century and were listed as historical monuments in 1928.

The parish church contains architectural elements dating from the 12th and 16th centuries. It was listed as a Monument historique on 3 June 1927.

== Population ==
Historical population
Year	Pop.	±% p.a.
1968	497	—
1975	434	−1.92%
1982	376	−2.03%
1990	354	−0.75%
1999	386	+0.97%
2007	421	+1.09%
2012	445	+1.11%
2017	435	−0.45%
2023	384	−2.06%
Source: INSEE

== See also ==
- Communes of the Aisne department
