= Battle of Blanc Mont Ridge =

Battle during the First World War

- Part of the Western Front of World War I
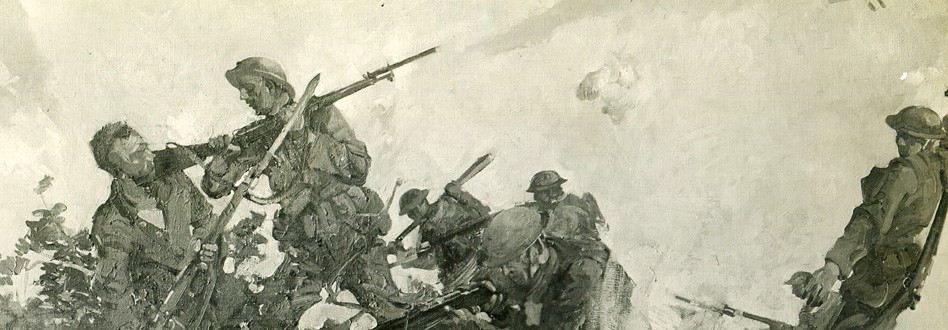
Date	3–27 October 1918
Location	Northeast of Reims 48°47′36″N 4°26′21″E
Result	Allied victory

Belligerents
France; United States	German Empire

Commanders and leaders
Henri Gouraud; John A. Lejeune; William Ruthven Smith	Crown Prince Wilhelm

Strength
French 4th Army (elements); 2 US Army divisions Assigned to French Fourth Army divisions United States Marines (elements)	2 German infantry divisions Six additional divisions(elements)

Casualties and losses
7,800 men, killed and wounded. Unknown number captured	Unknown; Unknown number captured

The Battle of Blanc Mont Ridge (3 October to 27 October 1918) occurred during World War I, northeast of Reims, in Champagne, France. The US Army's 2nd Infantry Division and the 36th Infantry Division alongside the French Fourth Army opposed the Imperial German Army's 200th and 213th divisions, along with portions of six additional German divisions. The German defense had four main lines of defense. The first line was located south of the village of Sommepy. The second line was one kilometer north of the village. Both of these lines were overrun quickly by the advancing French on the 26th of September 1918 before the attack on Blanc Mont Ridge. The third line was between Blanc Mont and Médéah Farm. These defenses were the hardest to attack because of their position. The fourth line was about 4 kilometers north of Blanc Mont. Blanc Mont was an important strategic location as it was the highest point in the Champagne Region, and if it fell, so would much of the surrounding area. On October 2, the combined forces of the French and American divisions both attacked from the left and the right with the goal of taking Blanc Mont. They faced heavy resistance from the German troops, but eventually were able to capture Blanc Mont. The result of this battle was the expulsion of the Imperial German Army from the Champagne Region.
