= Army of Occupation of Germany Medal =

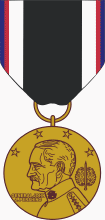
- Obverse
- Type: Military medal Service medal
- Awarded for: service in Germany or Austria-Hungary between November 12, 1918 and July 11, 1923.
- Country: United States
- Presented by: Secretary of War
- Eligibility: Military personnel only
- Status: Obsolete
- Established: November 21, 1941
- Service ribbon and campaign streamer

Precedence
- Next (higher): World War I Victory Medal
- Next (lower): American Defense Service Medal

The Army of Occupation of Germany Medal is a U.S. Army service medal established by an Act of Congress on November 21, 1941, (55 Stat 781). The military award recognized service in Germany or Austria-Hungary between November 12, 1918 and July 11, 1923.

== Background ==
The Army of Occupation of Germany Medal was established by Public Law 322 of the 77th United States Congress on November 21, 1941, and was formally announced in War Department Bulletin No. 34 dated December 10, 1941, and War Department Circular No. 176 dated June 6, 1942.

== Design ==
The Army of Occupation of Germany Medal was designed by Mr. T. A. Rovelstad, Heraldic Division, Office of the Quartermaster General, in June 1942, and was approved by the Secretary of War on July 8, 1942.

The medal is Bronze and 1 1/4 inches in diameter. On the obverse is a profile of General John J. Pershing, encircled by four stars indicating his insignia of grade as Commanding General of the Field Forces. In the lower left is the inscription "GENERAL JOHN J. PERSHING" and on the right is a laurel wreath superimposed by a sword with the dates "1918" and "1923" enclosed by the wreath.

The obverse of the medal includes the dates of the U.S. Occupation of Germany. The reverse depicts the American eagle perched with outspread wings standing on Ehrenbreitstein Fortress, which overlooks the Rhine in Coblenz, Germany, encircled by the words "U.S. ARMY OF OCCUPATION OF GERMANY" and three stars at the bottom of the medal. The three stars on the reverse symbolize the Third Army, which comprised the occupation forces of Germany.

The ribbon is 1 3/8 inches in width consisting of the following stripes: 1/16 inch Ultramarine Blue 67118; 1/16 inch Scarlet 67111; 3/16 inch White 67101; 3/4 inch Black 67138 (center); 3/16 inch White; 1/16 inch Scarlet; 1/16 inch Ultramarine Blue.
