= Austin Shofner =

American Marine Corps officer

Austin Conner Shofner
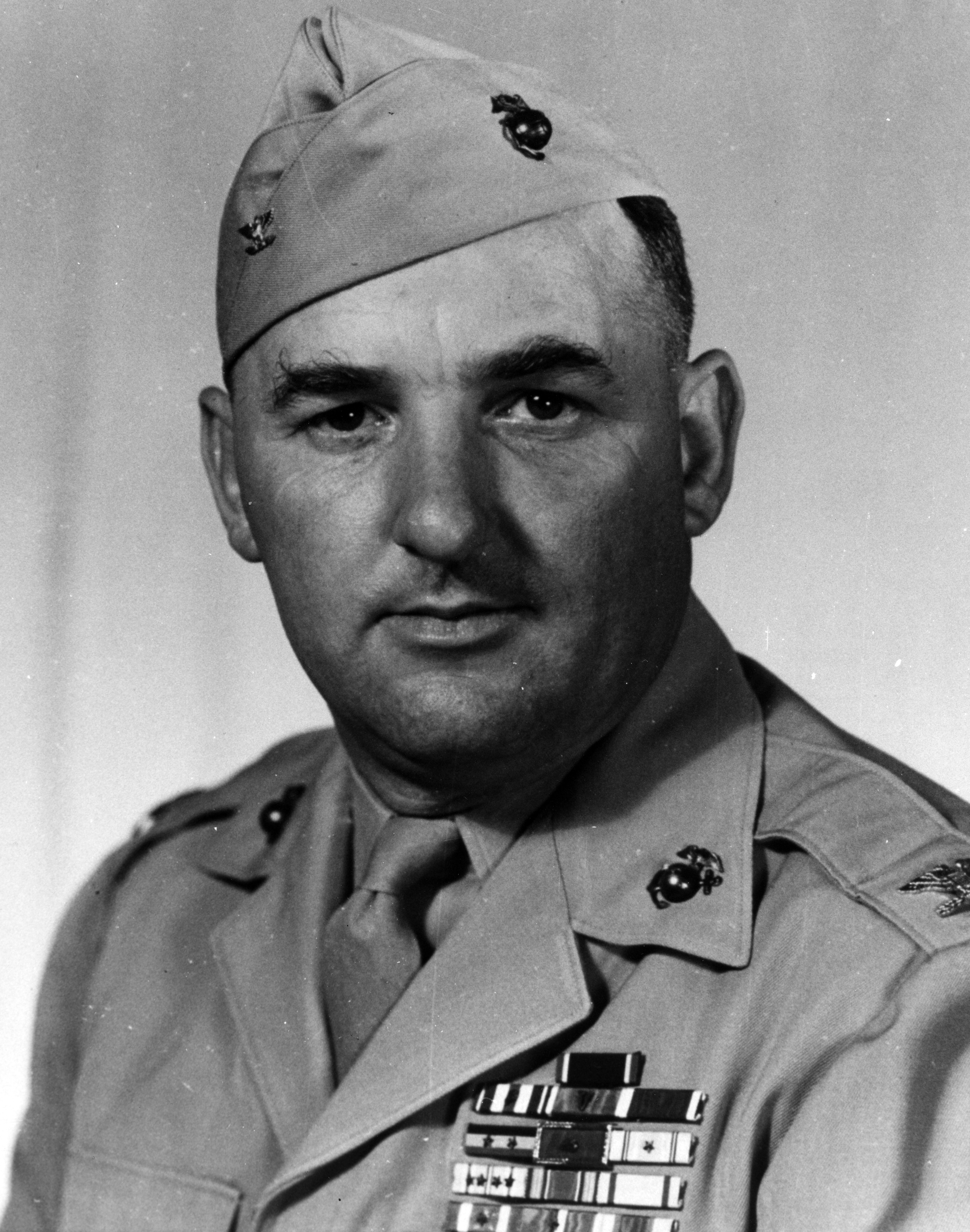
- Colonel Austin C. Shofner, USMC
- Born: March 3, 1916; Chattanooga, Tennessee, U.S.
- Died: November 13, 1999 (aged 83); Shelbyville, Tennessee, U.S.
- Burial place: Shofner Lutheran Church Cemetery, Bedford County, Tennessee; 35.4470°N 86.3299°W
- Military career
- Allegiance: United States
- Branch: United States Marine Corps
- Service years: 1937–1959
- Rank: Brigadier general
- Nickname: Shifty
- Commands: 3rd Battalion, 5th Marines; 1st Battalion, 1st Marines; Provost Marshal, 1st Marine Division; 6th Marine Regiment
- Conflicts: World War II: Philippines campaign (1941-1942); Battle of Corregidor; Philippine resistance against Japan; Battle of Peleliu; Battle of Luzon; Battle of Okinawa; Chinese Civil War: Operation Beleaguer
- Awards: Distinguished Service Cross; Silver Star (2); Legion of Merit; Purple Heart

Brigadier General Austin Conner Shofner (March 3, 1916 – November 13, 1999) was a United States Marine Corps officer who was captured during the Battle of Corregidor and then part of the only successful escape from a Japanese prisoner of war camp. He joined the Philippine resistance, and later returned to command units of the Marine Corps in the battles of Peleliu and Okinawa.

== Early life ==
Austin C. Shofner was born on March 3, 1916, in Chattanooga, Tennessee, as the son of Austin W. Shofner. He attended the high school in Shelbyville, Tennessee, and subsequently enrolled in the University of Tennessee in Knoxville. While at the university he was active on the wrestling and football team under famous Robert Neyland and was also a member of the ROTC unit. He graduated in the summer of 1937 with Bachelor of Science degree in commerce and was commissioned a second lieutenant in the Marine Corps on August 5, 1937.

As any other newly commissioned marine officer, Shofner was ordered to the Basic School at Philadelphia Navy Yard for further officer training. Many of his instructors were distinguished officers later, including Chesty Puller, Gilder D. Jackson Jr., Leonard B. Cresswell, Russell N. Jordahl, Howard N. Kenyon, and Roy M. Gulick. Shofner also attended the gunnery school aboard the battleship USS Nevada and was later attached to the Marine detachment aboard the battleship USS Oklahoma in August 1938. He participated in the patrols off the coast of Hawaii until June 1939, when he completed his tour of sea duty and reported for duty at Marine Corps Base San Diego, California.

Shofner was attached as first lieutenant to the 6th Marine Regiment there under the command of Colonel Samuel L. Howard. Because of his football experiences, he was appointed assistant coach of San Diego Marines and led them in the seasons 1939 and 1940. Shofner then served with 2nd Marine Regiment under Joseph C. Fegan from January to April 1941 and then sailed for Shanghai, China in May 1941 as a member of the Headquarters Company of 2nd Battalion, 4th Marines under lieutenant Colonel Donald Curtis.

== World War II ==
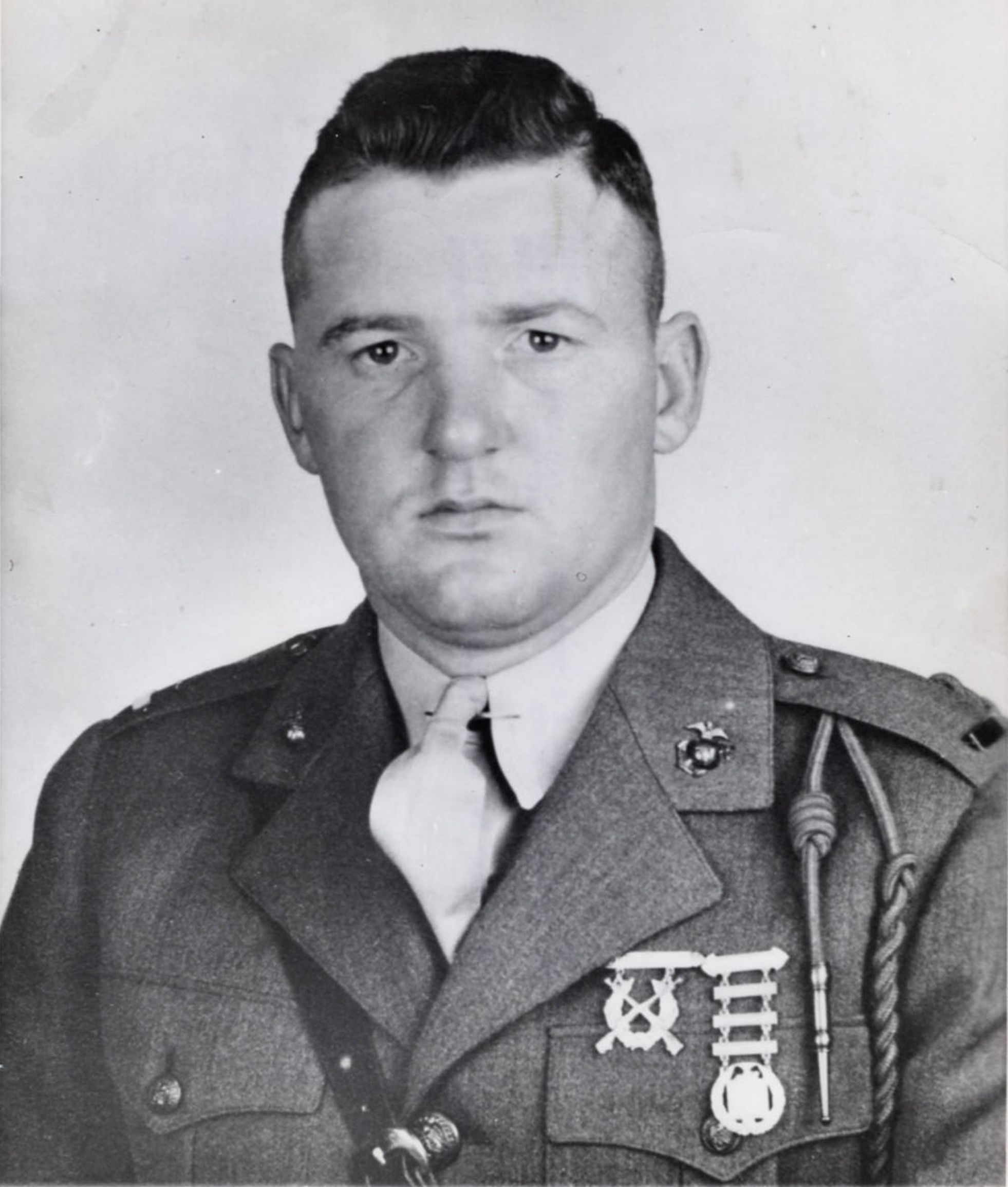
Future Brigadier General Austin C. Shofner as a first lieutenant in 1941.

The Fourth Marine Regiment under colonel Samuel L. Howard arrived to the Philippine Islands at the beginning of December 1941, just few days prior the Japanese attack. When the Japanese attack the Bataan, the Fourth Marines were already under army command and ordered to the strengthening of defensive installations at Corregidor. Shofner was promoted to the rank of captain on January 5, 1942, and assumed command of the Headquarters company.

While stationed at Fort Mills, Japanese bombers attacked the nearby ammunition dump in March 1942 and Shofner directed the extinguishing of a fire on a building at Middleside, while shells from a nearby burning ammunition dump were exploding and projecting into the area. On March 27, 1942, he succeeded in extinguishing a fire on buildings north of Middleside barracks caused by incendiary bombs, thus saving the entire line of buildings. Again on March 28, 1942, Captain Shofner directed the combating of a fire in an ammunition dump caused by enemy aerial bombardment, and then directed the removal of casualties from a caved-in shelter, all while the island was under shell fire from enemy shore batteries. Shofner was decorated with the Silver Star by the U.S. Army for his actions in March.

Following another Japanese attack on April 15, Shofner organized first aid parties, supervised evacuations of wounded men, and under a heavy enemy artillery barrage, drove the last truckload of wounded men to the hospital. He was then decorated with second Silver Star by the U.S. Army for this efforts.

He took part in the Battle of Corregidor at the beginning of May 1942 and following the surrender of the Corregidor garrison at about 1:30 p.m. on May 6, 1942, he was captured by Japanese on that day.

=== Captivity and escape ===
Shofner was transported with the rest of the captured Marines and soldiers to prison camps, and spent following eleven months at Bilibid, Cabanatuan and Davao Penal Colony. He and nine other Americans (including William Dyess, Jack Hawkins, and Samuel Grashio) planned an escape, for which they spent two months smuggling food and equipment to a jungle cache. Two Filipinos, who had been sentenced to Davao for murder, were taken into the escape plot to act as guides, and on April 4, 1943, the 12 slipped away from their working parties to begin their escape.

On April 7, after making their way through and jungle and dodging a Japanese patrol, the prisoners finally reached a Philippine guerrilla outpost. From there they were guided by wild Ata tribesmen and friendly Filipinos to the headquarters of the 110th Division, 10th Military District, which was engaged in guerrilla warfare against the Japanese. Here, Colonel Shofner and most of the other escapees volunteered to fight with the guerrillas, although it meant postponing their chance of evacuation to Australia. The colonel then served as the 110th Division's deputy chief of staff and operations officer, organizing the division staff, helping to train the new troops and leading an attack on a Japanese garrison.

=== Later World War II service ===
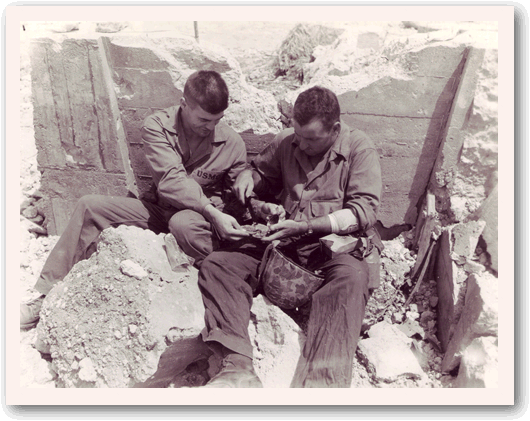
Austin C. Shofner (right) as lieutenant colonel and commanding officer of 3rd Battalion, 5th Marines during the battle of Peleliu, September 1944.

Evacuated to Australia in November 1943 by the submarine USS Narwhal, Shofner briefed the American Pacific Command on Japanese atrocities. He was awarded the Distinguished Service Cross by General Douglas MacArthur. While in the captivity, Shofner was promoted to the rank of major following his return to the United States.

He reported his experiences to the Army and Navy Intelligence in Washington, D.C., and using his experiences, it helped in the planning of the raid at Cabanatuan. Shofner was then ordered to the Marine Corps Schools, Quantico for instruction at the Command and Staff School there. He then served on the staff of Camp Lejeune, North Carolina under Major General Henry L. Larsen and received promotion to the rank of lieutenant colonel in June 1944.

Shofner was ordered back to the Pacific area during the next month and attached to the 1st Marine Division under Major General William H. Rupertus. The division was stationed at Pavuvu in the Russell Islands for rest and refitting after fighting at Cape Gloucester. He assumed command of 3rd Battalion, 5th Marines and led it ashore on Peleliu on September 15, 1944.

He was wounded in the left forearm by Japanese mortar fire during the landing and spent next two weeks in the rear for treatment. Shofner assumed command of Division Headquarters Battalion on October 3 and led it through the rest of the Peleliu campaign. For his wounds sustained on September 15, Shofner was decorated with the Purple Heart.

Shofner was appointed provost marshal of the 1st Marine Division in October and remained in this capacity until he was ordered as an observer to the 37th Infantry Division under Major General Robert S. Beightler for Battle of Luzon. He also held additional duty as advisor on guerrilla affairs to the command of Douglas MacArthur and finally returned to 1st Marine Division just in time for the Battle of Okinawa in May 1945.

He assumed command of 1st Battalion, 1st Marines on May 13 and after few weeks of patrolling as reserve force of 1st Marine Division, 1st Battalion commenced the assault on main Japanese defensive positions. Shofner and his unit took part in the assault on Kunishi Ridge and received the Legion of Merit with Combat "V".

== Postwar service ==
Shofner and his battalion were then stationed at Motobu Peninsula until the end of September 1945 and subsequently left for China. He led his unit during the Chinese Civil War in Tianjin area and took part in the combats against Chinese communists. Shofner distinguished himself and received Order of the Cloud and Banner with Special Cravat (4th Class) by the Government of China.

Shofner returned to the United States in February 1946 and, following a brief leave at home, assumed duty as commanding officer of the post service battalion at Marine Corps Base Quantico under Major General Clifton B. Cates. Shofner served as head coach of the Quantico Marines Devil Dogs football team during the 1946 season. He assumed duty in the Office of the Chief of Naval Operations under Fleet Admiral Chester W. Nimitz in January 1947, before he was ordered to Lima, Peru, for duty as naval attache and naval attache for air in March of that year. Shofner served in that country until June 1949 and received Peruvian Cross for Naval Merit.

Upon his return to the United States, Shofner assumed duty as inspector-instructor of 1st Marine Reserve Battalion at Fort Schuyler in New York City. He was then ordered to Camp Lejeune in September 1950 as executive officer of 2nd Marine Regiment, 2nd Marine Division and served in that capacity until January 1952. Shofner was meanwhile promoted to the rank of colonel in November 1951 and ordered to the staff of 2nd Marine Division under Major General Edwin A. Pollock as assistant chief of staff for intelligence (G-2).

In April 1952, Shofner took command of the headquarters and service battalion at the Marine Corps Recruit Depot Parris Island, South Carolina, under Major General Merwin H. Silverthorn. He served in this capacity until February 1953, when he assumed duty as assistant chief of staff for intelligence (G-2), and depot inspector. Following the departure of general Silverthorn in June 1954, Shofner was ordered to the Pentagon and appointed head of the Latin American Plans and Policy Section, Western Hemisphere Defense Branch, Strategic Plans Division, Office of the Chief of Naval Operations.

His final assignment came in summer of 1957, when he was attached to the staff of 2nd Marine Division. Shofner assumed duty as commanding officer of 6th Marines in July 1957 and sailed to Turkey for Operation Deep Water, NATO naval exercise held in the Mediterranean Sea that simulated protecting the Dardanelles from a Soviet invasion, in September of that year.

== Retirement ==
Shofner retired from the Marine Corps in 1959 and was advanced to the rank of brigadier general on the retired list for having been specially commended in combat. He returned to Tennessee and settled in Shelbyville. Shofner worked as an executive in insurance and finance also was active in local Republican politics, the Sons of the American Revolution and the 1st Marine Division Association.

He died on November 13, 1999, and was buried at Shofner Lutheran Church Cemetery, Tennessee, together with his wife, Kathleen King Shofner (1917–1996). They had four sons: William E., Martin K. and Dr. R. Stewart, all of Nashville, and Michael M. of Shelbyville.

== Decorations ==
Here is the ribbon bar of Brigadier General Austin C. Shofner:

1st Row	Distinguished Service Cross			Silver Star with Oak Leaf Cluster
2nd Row	Legion of Merit with Combat "V"	Purple Heart	Prisoner of War Medal	Navy Presidential Unit Citation with two stars
3rd Row	Army Presidential Unit Citation with Oak Leaf Cluster	American Defense Service Medal with Fleet Clasp	Asiatic-Pacific Campaign Medal with four 3/16 inch service stars	American Campaign Medal
4th Row	World War II Victory Medal	Navy Occupation Service Medal	China Service Medal	National Defense Service Medal
5th Row	Philippine Defense Medal with one star	Philippine Liberation Medal with one star	Peruvian Aviation Cross, 1st Class	Order of the Cloud and Banner with Special Cravat (4th Class) (Republic of China)
