= Wake Island (film) =

1942 action drama war film by John Farrow

- Directed by: John Farrow
- Written by: W. R. Burnett; Frank Butler
- Produced by: Joseph Sistrom
- Starring: Brian Donlevy; Macdonald Carey; Robert Preston; Albert Dekker; William Bendix; Walter Abel
- Cinematography: William C. Mellor; Theodor Sparkuhl
- Edited by: Frank Bracht; LeRoy Stone
- Music by: David Buttolph
- Production company: Paramount Pictures
- Distributed by: Paramount Pictures
- Release date: September 1, 1942 (New York City)
- Running time: 88 minutes
- Country: United States
- Language: English
- Budget: $826,000
- Box office: $3.5 million (U.S. and Canada rentals)

Wake Island is a 1942 American action drama war film directed by John Farrow, written by W. R. Burnett and Frank Butler, and starring Brian Donlevy, Robert Preston, Macdonald Carey, Albert Dekker, Barbara Britton, and William Bendix. The film tells the story of the United States military garrison on Wake Island and the onslaught by the Japanese following the attack on Pearl Harbor.

Wake Island was nominated for four Academy Awards, including Outstanding Motion Picture.

The film shows how the Marines, after being pounded for days by Japanese aircraft, caught the Japanese invaders by complete surprise by unleashing a wall of fire that stopped their first attempt to land on the island. The next attack was successful, in part because communications among the Marines had been cut, leading the Marine commander to believe his three hundred men were being slaughtered by the more than three thousand Japanese invaders. Because of their fierce defense of the island and because a Japanese cruiser was sunk, Marines were beheaded on the way to Japan to work as slaves in the mines there.

== Plot ==
A map is shown with a voiceover giving a brief history of the United States military on Wake Island to November 1941. U.S. Marine Corps Major Geoffrey Caton departs Pearl Harbor naval base in Hawaii aboard the Pan American Clipper to take command on Wake Island where he clashes with a military contractor named McClosky.

When Caton's inspection identifies Privates Randall and Doyle as troublemakers, he has them dig a large slit trench by hand. McClosky has a construction contract for large trenches and living quarters, and drives his crew to complete the work on time. There are numerous conflicts between the military and the civilians, including practicing for air raids.

On Sunday, December 7, 1941, Randall's enlistment is up. As he prepares to board the Clipper news arrives about the Japanese attack on Pearl Harbor. Wake Island is placed on alert and Randall, unsure what to do, goes to a bomb shelter with the civilians as enemy planes approach. Four American are sent against 24 Japanese bombers, downing several but unable to prevent heavy bomb damage on the ground. Following the raid, Caton tells Randall he is no longer a civilian. McClosky stays to dig trenches and other shelters with his heavy equipment. Caton informs pilot Lieutenant Bruce Cameron that his wife was killed at Pearl Harbor.

When enemy ships approach the Marines camouflage their equipment and Caton orders them to hold their fire during the Japanese naval bombardment. Caton refuses to answer a Japanese call for surrender, and opens fire on the Japanese ships once they've reached to 4700 yards distance. Their fire repels the landing attempt and sinks several ships.

A reconnaissance flight spots a Japanese heavy cruiser that can fire on the island from outside the defenders' weapon range. Caton approves Cameron's plan to strip a fighter plane down to just 15 gallons of fuel and a double bomb load. After successfully bombing the ship, Cameron is wounded by a Japanese fighter, but lands his plane safely before dying. Caton asks Captain Lewis to fly back to Honolulu aboard a U.S. Navy patrol plane to provide intelligence to the U.S. Navy Department. When Lewis refuses, Caton makes it an order.

As they run out of large-caliber ammunition, Caton spreads his men wider with smaller guns. Japanese planes continue to bomb the island repeatedly inflicting major damage and casualties. The last American pilot, Captain Patrick, is killed bailing out of a damaged plane.

The Japanese again signal for surrender. Caton replies, "Come and get us" and orders his posts to act independently. When communications fail, Caton orders the last man out of his command post with a written message. McClosky walks in, asking for a weapon and they make their way to an abandoned machine-gun position where Caton mans the gun. The Japanese land and overrun the American positions. The film ends as the last of the main characters are killed in action and a voiceover declares: "This is not the end."

== Cast ==
- Brian Donlevy as Major Geoffrey Caton
- Macdonald Carey as Lieutenant Bruce Cameron
- Robert Preston as Private Joe Doyle
- William Bendix as Private Aloysius K. Randall
- Albert Dekker as Shad McClosky
- Walter Abel as Commander Roberts
- Mikhail Rasumny as Ivan Probenzky
- Rod Cameron as Captain Pete Lewis
- Bill Goodwin as Sergeant Higbee
- Damian O'Flynn as Captain Bill Patrick
- Frank Albertson as Johnny Rudd
- Philip Van Zandt as Cpl. Gus Goebbels (uncredited)
- Uncredited actors include Filipino Hollywood actor Rudy Robles as Triunfo, James Brown as a wounded marine, Barbara Britton as Sally Cameron, and Patti McCarty as a girl at the inn. Chuck Connors is sometimes erroneously credited as a soldier in the meal line, but Connors was not in California during production, being at that time a full-time player for the Norfolk Tars, a baseball team in the minor league Piedmont League. Mary Thomas appeared as Caton's daughter.

== Production ==
The film was based on official Marine records. A copy of the script by W. R. Burnett and Frank Butler was sent to the Marine Corps for approval prior to filming.

Director John Farrow had recently returned to Hollywood after being invalided out of the Canadian Navy. He was signed to make the film by Buddy DeSylva of Paramount, who liked Farrow's 1939 film Five Came Back. Farrow had visited Wake Island during his pre-Hollywood sailing days.

Filming started 23 March 1942. Most of the Japanese were played by Filipinos.

A special weapons detail of selected Marines from Camp Elliott, near San Diego, manned machine guns in land battle scenes. Marine crews were also used as extras and to operate equipment.

Three main locations were used. Most exteriors were shot in the Salton Sea in the California desert; filming took place here for three weeks at Sandy Beach which resembled Wake Island. The aerial battles were filmed at the Great Salt Lake in Utah. The big guns were fired at a coastal firing range near San Diego.

The film was a fictional account with Brian Donlevy's character being based on Major James P. S. Devereux, commander of the 1st Defense Battalion detachment on Wake. MacDonald Carey's was based on Major Henry T. Elrod and Captain Frank Cunningham. Walter Abel played the naval commander who in real life was Commander Winfield S. Cunningham.

The film crew had to battle intense sand storms on Sand Island. Following the location shoot, the main unit returned to Paramount Studio for three weeks of filming, while the second unit remained at Salton Sea under Hal Walker to do bombing scenes.

After completing the film, Farrow signed a long-term contract with Paramount.

MacDonald Carey was so inspired by working on the picture that he joined the United States Marine Corps after filming ended.

A radio play drama version featuring many of the same film actors was broadcast October 26, 1942 on the Lux Radio Theatre, hosted by Cecil B. DeMille on the CBS radio network.

== Reception ==
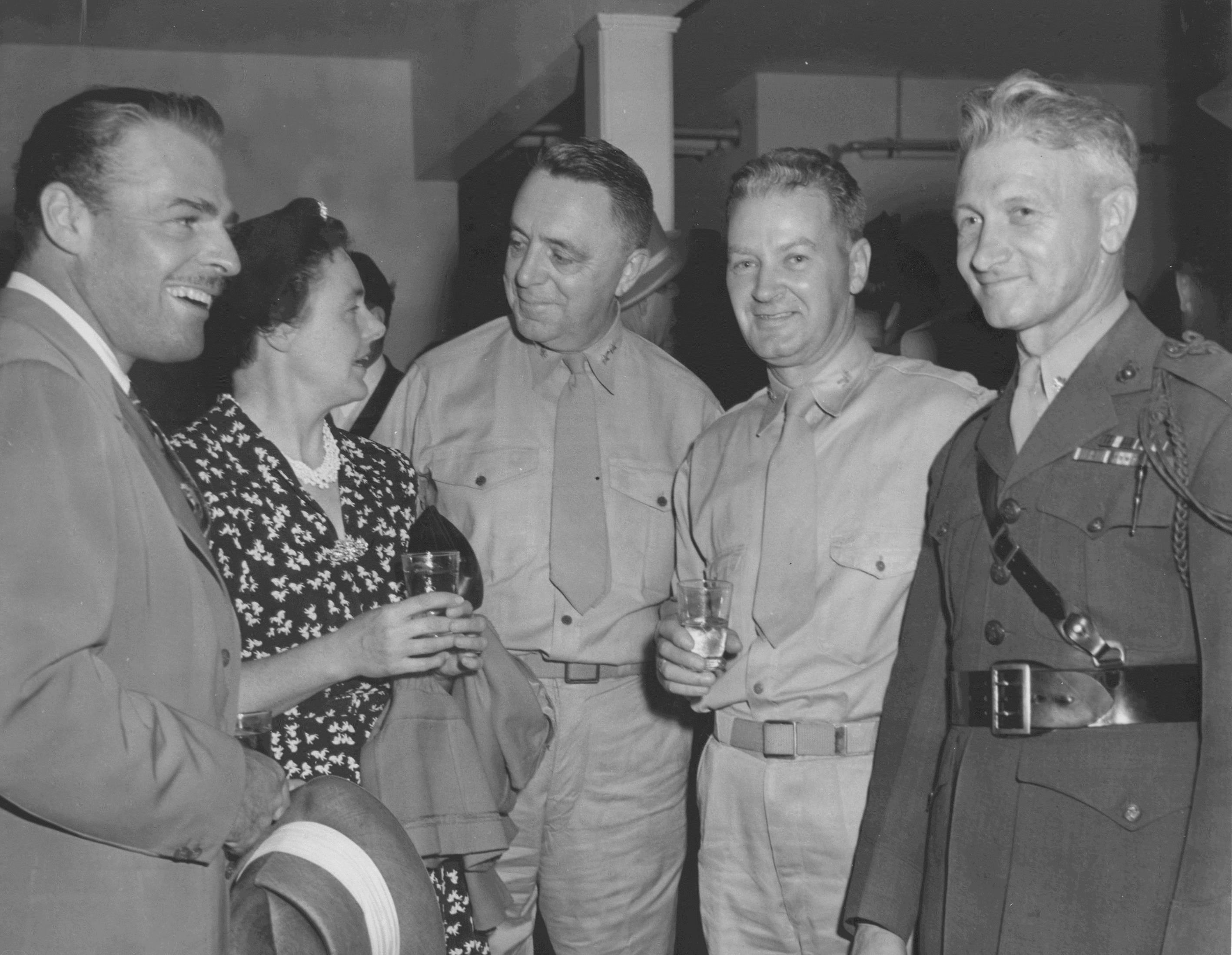
Brian Donlevy, Mrs. Hermle, Major General John Marston, Colonel Leo D. Hermle, and Major Raymond W. Hanson at the film premiere

The film received positive reviews from critics. Bosley Crowther of The New York Times called it "a film for which its makers deserve a sincere salute. Except for the use of fictional names and a very slight contrivance of plot, it might be a literal document of the manner in which the Wake detachment of Marines fought and died in the finest tradition of their tough and indomitable corps."

Variety agreed and called it "one of the most striking pictures of the year ... Never is there pandering to phoney flag-waving, always just a group of normal human beings who knew of no other course than fighting to the end."

Harrison's Reports called it "Thrilling ... The realism of the Japanese attacks, and the stout defense put up by the Marines, are spine-chilling battle scenes that hold one in constant suspense, even though one is aware of the final outcome." Film Daily called it a "Stirring epic which will thrill the nation."

Wake Island placed fourth on Film Daily's year-end nationwide poll of 592 critics selecting the best films of the year.

On Rotten Tomatoes, Wake Island holds a rating of 89% based on 9 contemporary and modern reviews.

It was one of the biggest box office hits of the year.

== Awards ==
At the 15th Academy Awards on March 4, 1943, Wake Island was nominated for Outstanding Motion Picture, Best Director (John Farrow), Best Actor in a Supporting Role (William Bendix), and Original Screenplay (W.R. Burnett and Frank Butler). John Farrow won the New York Film Critics' Award for Best Director.
