= Harold G. Glasgow =

United States Marine Corps general (1929–2020)

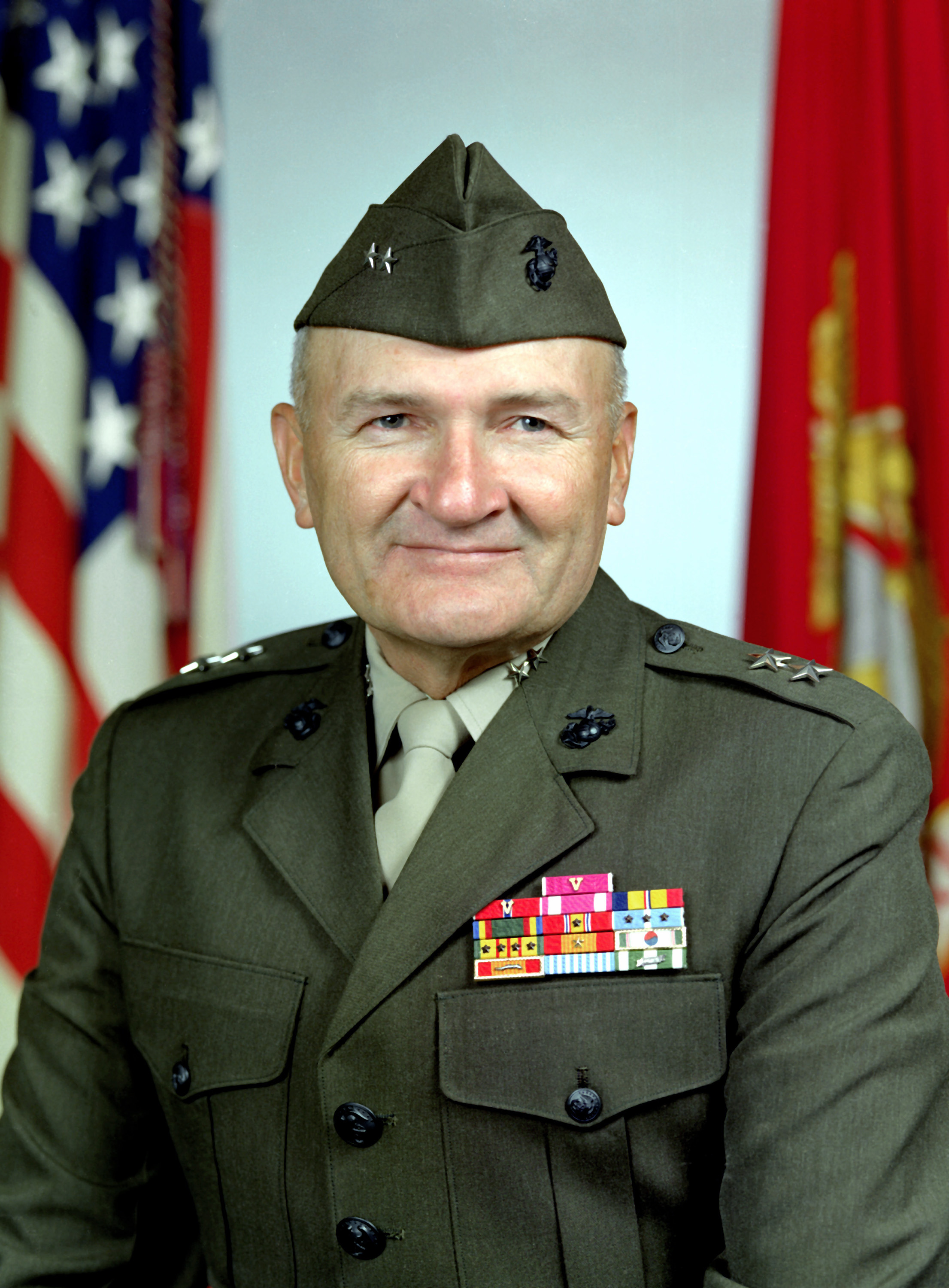
- Born: February 4, 1929; Heflin, Alabama, U.S.
- Died: January 19, 2020 (aged 90); Nashville, Tennessee, U.S.
- Military career
- Allegiance: United States
- Branch: United States Marine Corps
- Service years: 1951–1980s
- Rank: Major general
- Commands: Marine Corps Recruit Depot

Harold Glyn Glasgow (February 4, 1929 – January 19, 2020) was a major general in the United States Marine Corps who served as commanding general of Marine Corps Recruit Depot. He is an alumnus of the University of Alabama. Glasgow served as commanding officer of 6th Marine Regiment from 8 May 1975 to 3 June 1976.
