= Alphonse DeCarre =

United States Marine Corps general

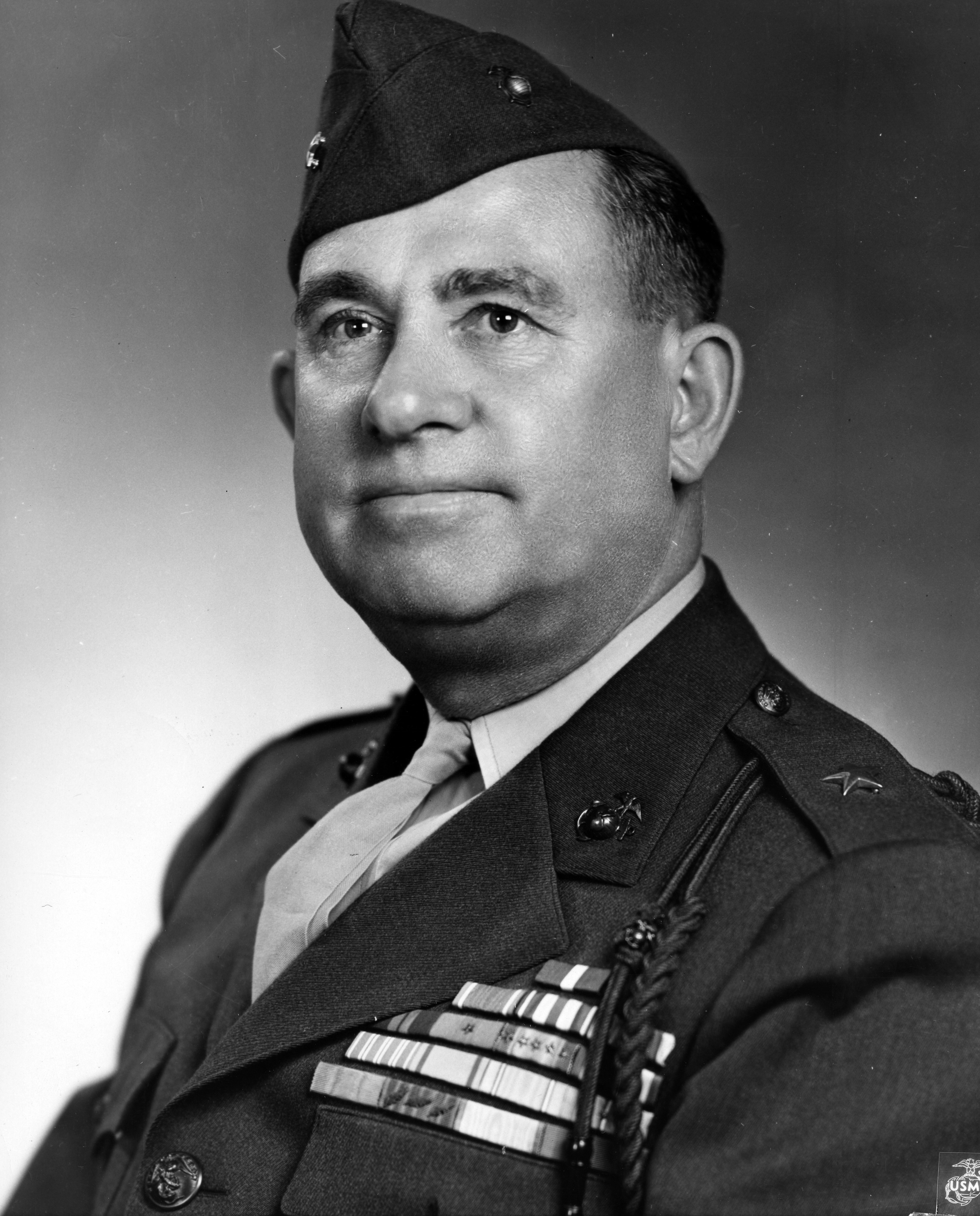
- DeCarre as brigadier general, USMC
- Born: November 15, 1892; Washington, D.C., US
- Died: May 3, 1977 (aged 84); Hightstown, New Jersey, US
- Burial place: Fort Rosecrans National Cemetery
- Military career
- Allegiance: United States
- Branch: United States Marine Corps
- Service years: 1913–1946
- Rank: Major General
- Nickname: "Frenchy"
- Service number: 0-230
- Commands: 2nd Marine Division; History Division
- Conflicts: Haitian Campaign World War I: Aisne-Marne Offensive; Battle of Soissons; Battle of Belleau Wood; Battle of Château-Thierry; Battle of Saint-Mihiel; Battle of Blanc Mont Ridge; Meuse-Argonne Offensive; Nicaraguan Campaign World War II: Battle of Guadalcanal; Battle of Gifu
- Awards: Navy Cross; Distinguished Service Cross; Silver Star; Purple Heart

Alphonse DeCarre (November 15, 1892 – May 3, 1977) was a highly decorated Major General in the United States Marine Corps. He was a recipient of the second highest decorations of the Army and Navy, the Distinguished Service Cross and the Navy Cross, both of which he earned during his service in World War I.

== Early military career ==
DeCarre was born on November 15, 1892, in Washington, D.C., where he attended public schools. He entered the Marine Corps and was commissioned second lieutenant on November 15, 1913. DeCarre subsequently attended Marine Corps Officers School at Norfolk Base and graduated in 1915 together with many future Marine Corps generals like for example William H. Rupertus, Allen H. Turnage, Henry Louis Larsen, Lyle H. Miller and Matthew H. Kingman.

On June 30, 1915, DeCarre joined 2nd Marine Regiment, 1st Marine Brigade stationed at Philadelphia Navy Yard at the time. He sailed for Haiti and disembarked on 15 August at Port-au-Prince. DeCarre participated in the skirmishes with the Haitian rebels near the towns Gonaïves and Ennery. During that time, he was promoted to the rank of first lieutenant on August 26, 1916. At the beginning of December 1916, DeCarre was assigned to the Marine Detachment aboard the battleship USS New York and was engaged in shore duty at Oriente, Cuba. For his service in Haiti, he was decorated with Haitian Medal of Honour and Merit with Diploma, Officer and Haitian Distinguished Service Medal and Diploma.

== World War I ==
With the declaration of War on Germany in April 1917, DeCarre, who was already promoted to the rank of captain on March 26, was transferred to the 5th Marine Regiment, where he was appointed commanding officer of the Regiment's Headquarters Company.

DeCarre arrived at Saint-Nazaire, France, in July 1917 and was subsequently assigned for instruction to the Signal School in the town of Génis. He was back with his headquarters company in the trenches in Verdun Sector in March 1918 and served there until May 1918.

During the Battle of Belleau Wood in June 1918, Captain DeCarre participated with his company in the advance against enemy positions and was the only officer who led his company in the correct direction during the assault. He was able to flank the enemy machine gun position, which pinned down the rest of allies unit participating in advance, and capture entire the enemy machine gun company consisting of three officers and 169 men only with 6 men. For his efforts during the battle, DeCarre was decorated with the Distinguished Service Cross and later also with the Navy Cross.

He subsequently participated with his headquarters company in the Aisne-Marne Offensive, Battle of Château-Thierry, Battle of Soissons, before he was promoted to the temporary rank of major on September 6, 1918, and appointed operations and intelligence officer of the 5th Marine Regiment.

DeCarre served in this capacity during the Battle of Blanc Mont Ridge and was decorated with the Silver Star citation for gallantry in action on October 9, 1918. He was also decorated with Légion d'honneur, rank of Chevalier and Croix de guerre 1914–1918 with Palm by the Government of France for his part in the battle. He was also wounded and stayed in the field hospital until the end of October. After his recovery, DeCarre returned to his post of operations and intelligence officer and served during Meuse-Argonne Offensive.

== Interwar period ==
DeCarre remained in the Marine Corps after the War and served with 5th Marine Regiment during the Allied occupation of the Rhineland. He returned to the United States on 5 April 1919 and was reverted to the rank of captain. After brief leave, he was appointed executive officer during the National Rifle Matches. DeCarre was detached to the Marine barracks at Philadelphia Naval Shipyard, where he was assigned to the 1st Marine Regiment. He then served aboard USS Prometheus during shore duties in Haiti and Santo Domingo.

He also served with Marine Legation Guard in Peking, China, from January 25, 1922, to January 1924, when he was ordered back to the United States and assigned to the Marine barracks in San Diego.

On 26 June 1926, DeCarre attended a course at the Naval War College and graduated a year later. He was promoted to the rank of major on 12 March 1928. He was then ordered to Marine Corps School at Marine Corps Base Quantico, where he attended the Junior Course and subsequently also Field Officer's Course. He was then ordered for shore duty during Nicaraguan Campaign with 2nd Marine Brigade.

On 31 August 1934, DeCarre was appointed director of United States Marine Corps History Division. He was succeeded by Lieutenant Colonel Clyde H. Metcalf on 5 February 1935. He was subsequently assigned to the Marine barracks at Norfolk Navy Yard and served there until May 1936.

Following a tour of duty at Headquarters Marine Corps in Washington, D.C., DeCarre was transferred to Marine barracks in San Diego on 10 June 1937. He was promoted to the rank of colonel on September 5, 1938.

He was appointed commander of the Marine barracks at Puget Sound, Washington, in June 1939. In this capacity, he also served as district Marine officer and commander of 13th Reserve District.

== World War II ==
At the time of the United States entry into the World War II, DeCarre still served with the Marine barracks at Puget Sound. He remained in this capacity until end of July 1942, when he was transferred to the 2nd Marine Division in San Diego and appointed its assistant division commander. For his new duties, he was also promoted to the rank of brigadier general on August 19, 1942.

The 2nd Division was sent to the Pacific Theater in December 1942 under the command of Major General John Marston. The 2nd Division subsequently participated in the Guadalcanal Campaign; however, Marston remained in New Zealand, because he was superior in time in rank to Army Major General Alexander M. Patch, who was in charge of the entire offensive. This step has been made for the sweetening of the relationships between Marine Corps and Army. Nonetheless, DeCarre was in charge of all Marine ground units on Guadalcanal after the departure of the 1st Marine Division in October.

General DeCarre remained temporarily in command of the 2nd Marine Division until May 1943, when he was relieved by Major General Julian C. Smith. In the capacity of assistant division commander, he was succeeded by Brigadier General Leo D. Hermle. DeCarre then returned to the United States in June 1943 and was admitted to the Naval Hospital in San Diego for treatment of tropical disease. For his service on Guadalcanal, DeCarre later received a Letter of Commendation for his outstanding work during the campaign from General Patch.

After his recovery, DeCarre was assigned to Camp Pendleton, where he was appointed chief of staff to Major General Joseph C. Fegan Sr., commander of the base. DeCarre was later transferred to the Marine Corps Base Quantico in April 1944 and served there for the rest of the War. He retired from the Marine Corps in June 1946 and was advanced to the rank of major general on the retired list for having been specially commended in combat.

== Decorations ==

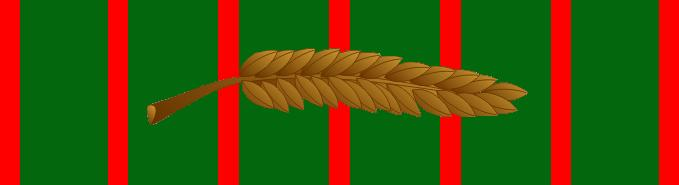

1st Row	Navy Cross		Distinguished Service Cross	Silver Star	French Fourragère
2nd Row	Navy Commendation Medal	Purple Heart	Marine Corps Expeditionary Medal with one service star	Haitian Campaign Medal	French Fourragère
3rd Row	World War I Victory Medal with five battle clasps	Army of Occupation of Germany Medal	Nicaraguan Campaign Medal (1933)	China Service Medal	French Fourragère
4th Row	American Defense Service Medal	American Campaign Medal	Asiatic-Pacific Campaign Medal with two service stars	World War II Victory Medal	French Fourragère
5th Row	Chevalier of the Légion d'honneur	French Croix de guerre 1914-1918 with Palm	Haitian Medal of Honour and Merit with Diploma, Officer	Haitian Distinguished Service Medal and Diploma	French Fourragère

Military offices
Preceded by John Marston	2nd Marine Division; March, 1943 – May, 1943	Succeeded by Julian C. Smith

== Personal ==
On May 18, 1928, DeCarre married Mildred I. Chambley in New York City. After his retirement from the Marine Corps, DeCarre resided in Coronado, California, together with his wife and their daughter Patricia.

Their daughter married, moved to New Jersey and had three sons. In 1969, Mildred DeCarre died at the Balboa Naval Hospital in San Diego. In 1977, Major General Alphonse DeCarre died while in Hightstown, New Jersey. DeCarre and his wife are interred at Fort Rosecrans National Cemetery.
