= Russell N. Jordahl =

United States Marine Corps Brigadier general

Russell Nelton Jordahl
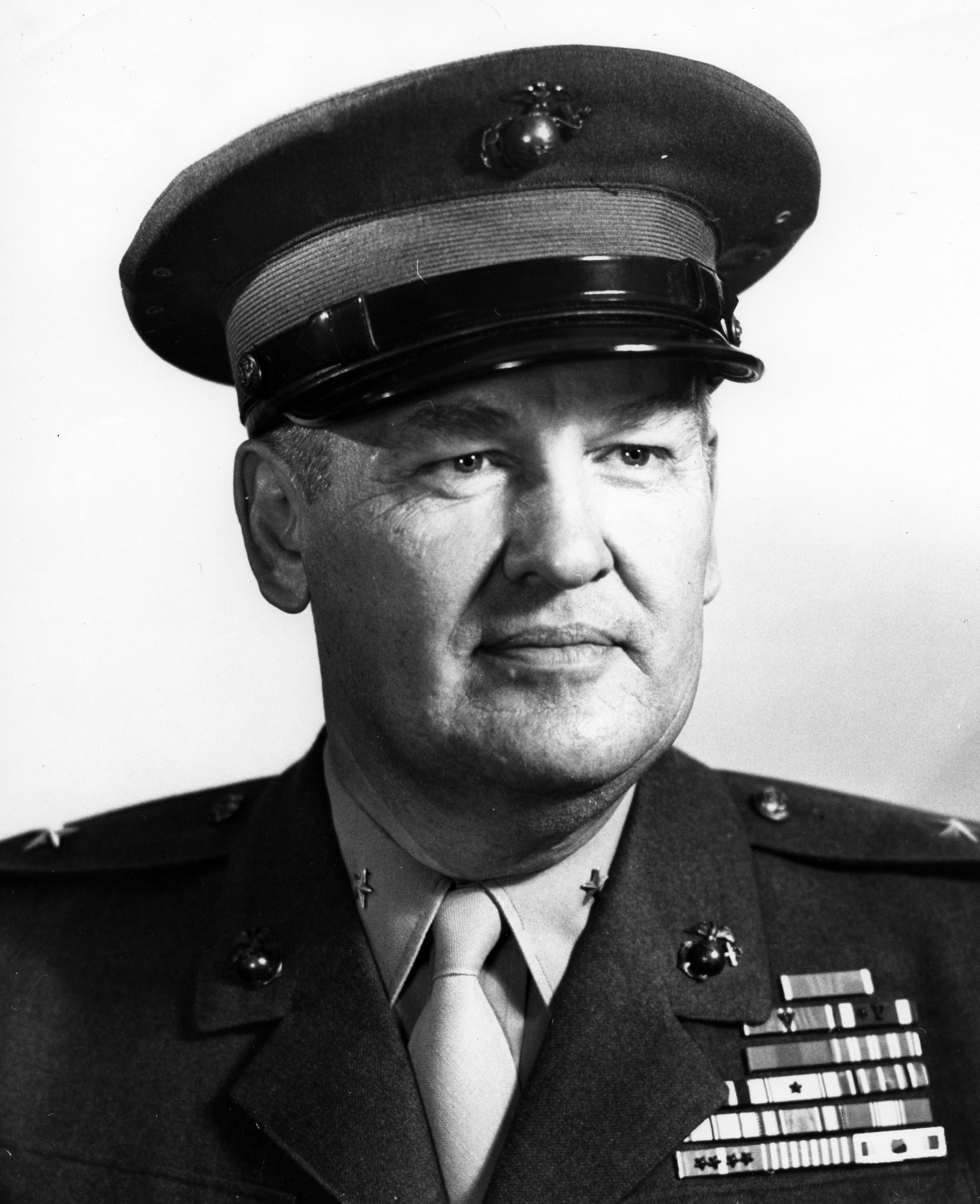
- BG Russell N. Jordahl, USMC
- Born: September 21, 1903; Freeborn, Minnesota
- Died: November 27, 1988 (aged 85); San Diego, California
- Military career
- Allegiance: United States of America
- Branch: United States Marine Corps
- Service years: 1926–1958
- Rank: Brigadier general
- Nickname: Russ
- Service number: 0-4086
- Commands: Landing Force Training Unit, Pacific; Camp Lejeune; 1st Combat Service Group; 6th Marine Regiment
- Conflicts: Nicaraguan Campaign; Yangtze Patrol; World War II; Battle of Iwo Jima; Korean War; Jamestown Line
- Awards: Legion of Merit; Bronze Star Medal; Navy Commendation Medal (2)

Russell Nelton Jordahl (September 21, 1903 – November 27, 1988) was a decorated officer in the United States Marine Corps with the rank of brigadier general. A Veteran of World War II, Korea and several expeditionary tours, Jordahl completed his career as commanding general, Landing Force Training Unit, Pacific.

== Early career ==
Russell N. Jordahl was born on September 21, 1903, in Freeborn, Minnesota, as the son of Peter A. Jordahl and Amanda Thykeson. He grew up in Iowa and graduated from the high school in Monona in summer 1921. Jordahl subsequently attended the State University of Iowa in Iowa City for one year, before he received an appointment to the United States Naval Academy at Annapolis, Maryland.

He graduated with bachelor's degree on June 3, 1926, and was commissioned second lieutenant in the Marine Corps. Following the graduation, Jordahl was ordered to the Basic School at Philadelphia Navy Yard for basic officer training, which he completed in February 1927. He then served at the Marine Barracks Parris Island, South Carolina until March 1928, when he was sent to the Marine Corps Base San Diego, California and attached to the 2nd Marine Brigade. Jordahl embarked with that unit to Nicaragua one month later and took part in the combat operations against bandit forces under Augusto César Sandino.

Upon his return stateside in April 1930, Jordahl was ordered to the Marine barracks at Puget Sound Navy Yard near Bremerton, Washington, and subsequently assumed command of Naval Ammunition Depot there. He was promoted to first lieutenant in September 1931 and departed Puget Sound in May of the following year. He then joined 4th Marine Regiment under Colonel Emile P. Moses at Shanghai International Settlement, China and participated in the guard duties during a period of tensions between China and Japan.

He was ordered back to the United States in July 1935 and entered the regular course at Army Infantry School at Fort Benning, Georgia. Jordahl graduated in June 1936 and was sent back to Philadelphia Navy Yard for duty as an instructor at the Basic School.

While in this assignment, he had the opportunity to work with great names in the modern Marine Corps history like for example Gilder D. Jackson Jr., Chesty Puller, Leonard B. Cresswell, Frank B. Goettge, Walfried M. Fromhold, Howard N. Kenyon or Roy M. Gulick who served also as instructors at the school. Jordahl was promoted to captain on June 30, 1936.

In June 1939, Jordahl was appointed commander of the Marine detachment aboard the battleship USS West Virginia stationed in Hawaii. In April 1940, he took part in the Fleet Problem XXI which simulated possible Japanese offensive action.

== World War II ==
In June 1941, Jordahl was promoted to the temporary rank of major and ordered to Washington, D.C., for duty at Marine Corps Headquarters. During that time, Jordahl completed Naval War College Correspondence Course in International law and received promotion to lieutenant colonel in August 1942. He was then attached to the Personnel Department and served as assistant to the director of personnel, Littleton W. T. Waller Jr. until September 1943, when he was appointed officer-in-charge, Detail Division at the Personnel Department. For his service in that capacities, he was decorated with the Navy Commendation Medal.

Jordahl was promoted to colonel and detached from the Marine Corps Headquarters in July 1944. He was ordered to Hawaii, where he joined the headquarters, Fleet Marine Force, Pacific (FMFPac) under Lieutenant General Holland Smith and was appointed assistant chief of staff for personnel (G-1). He was stationed at Pearl Harbor and was responsible for FMFPac personnel matters until July 1947. Jordahl was subsequently decorated with the Legion of Merit for his service with FMFPac.

== Later career ==
=== 1947–1951 ===
Jordahl returned to the United States in July 1947 and joined the staff of Marine Corps Recruit Depot Parris Island under Major General Alfred H. Noble. He served as post inspector and assistant chief of staff for operations and training until March 1949, when he was appointed chief of staff of the depot.

He was detached in June 1950 and ordered to Camp Lejeune, where he served briefly as commanding officer, 6th Marine Regiment, 2nd Marine Division under Major General Ray A. Robinson. Jordahl assumed duty as Divisional Inspector in August of that year and held that assignment until June 1951, when he was ordered to Korea.

=== Korean War ===
Following his arrival to Korea, Jordahl joined the staff of 1st Marine Division under Major General Gerald C. Thomas as Divisional Inspector and conducted several inspection trips to the forward areas for which he received his second Navy Commendation Medal with Combat "V".

Jordahl held that assignment until September 1951, when he assumed command of 1st Combat Service Group (1st CSG). The 1st CSG served as 1st Marine Division reinforced logistical support and Jordahl commanded nearly 1,400 marines and navy medical personnel stationed at various points between Japan and Korea.

At Kobe, Japan, the support company of his command processed Marine drafts arriving and departing Korea. At Masan, the supply company of 1st CSG, requisitioned for the division those Class II and IV items peculiar to the Marine Corps needs and forwarded them upon request. Heavy maintenance of all technical equipment was performed by the Maintenance Company. Supporting the 1st Motor Transport Battalion operation was the Motor Transport Company, 1st CSG. Most of the group, including Headquarters Company, was based at Masan. Splinter detachment from the group also operated transport facilities at other locations in Korea. Jordahl remained in Korea until the end of June 1952 and received the Bronze Star Medal with Combat "V".

=== 1952–1958 ===
Jordahl returned to the United States in July 1952 and joined again the Personnel Department at Headquarters Marine Corps. He served as assistant director of personnel and deputy to Major General Reginald H. Ridgely Jr. until August 1954, when he was promoted to brigadier general and ordered to Camp Lejeune, North Carolina. He assumed duty as chief of staff and deputy commander, Camp Lejeune under Major General Chesty Puller and also served as acting base commander following the retirement of General Puller on November 1, 1955.

Upon the arrival of new base commander, Major General Homer Litzenberg, on December 1, 1955, Jordahl resumed his duties as deputy commander and chief of staff of Camp Lejeune and held that command until July 1956.

He then assumed his final duty, when he was appointed commanding general, Landing Force Training Unit, Pacific, which was responsible for the amphibious training of all units of United States Pacific Fleet. Jordahl was succeeded by Brigadier General Harvey C. Tschirgi on June 30, 1958, and retired after 32 years of active service.

== Death ==
Following the retirement from the Marine Corps, Jordahl settled with his wife Edith MacDonald in California, where he died on November 27, 1988, in San Diego.

== Decorations ==
Here is the ribbon bar of Brigadier General Russell N. Jordahl:

1st row	Legion of Merit		Bronze Star Medal with Combat "V"
2nd row	Navy Commendation Medal with Combat "V" and one 5/16" Gold Star	Marine Corps Expeditionary Medal	Second Nicaraguan Campaign Medal
3rd row	Yangtze Service Medal	American Defense Service Medal with Fleet Clasp	American Campaign Medal
4th row	Asiatic-Pacific Campaign Medal	World War II Victory Medal	National Defense Service Medal
5th row	Korean Service Medal with four 3/16 inch service stars	United Nations Korea Medal	Korean Presidential Unit Citation

== See also ==
- 1st Combat Service Group

Military offices
Preceded by Chesty Puller	Commanding General, Marine Corps Base Camp Lejeune; November 1, 1955 – December 1, 1955	Succeeded by Homer Litzenberg
