= John Marston (USMC) =

U.S. Marine Corps Major General

John Marston VI
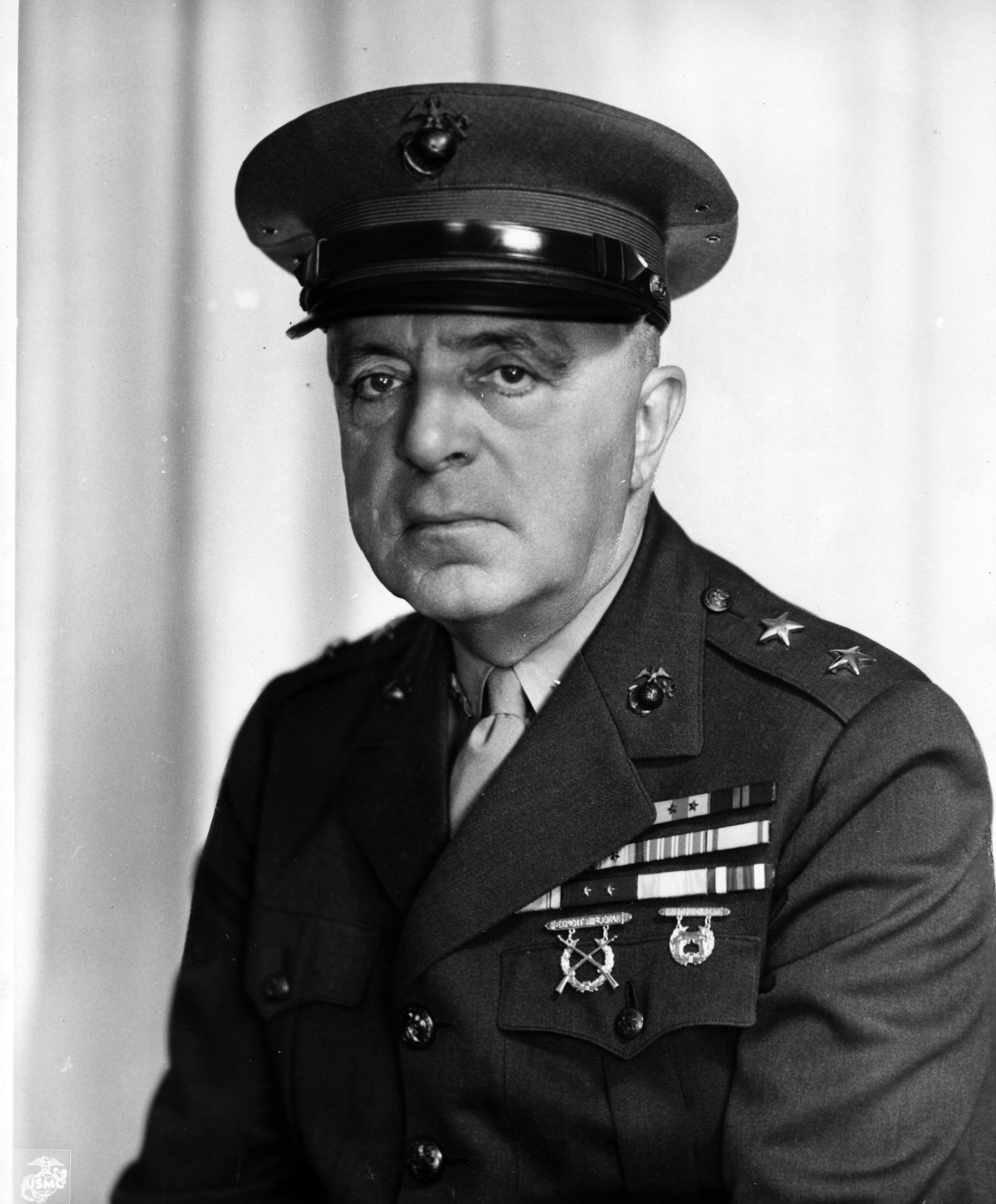
- Major General John Marston, USMC
- Born: August 3, 1884; Somerset County, Pennsylvania, U.S.
- Died: November 25, 1957 (aged 73); Lexington, Virginia, U.S.
- Burial place: Oak Grove Cemetery; Lexington, Virginia
- Relatives: RADM John Marston III (great-grandfather); LTCOL John Marston VII (son)
- Military career
- Allegiance: United States of America
- Branch: United States Marine Corps
- Service years: 1908–1946
- Rank: Major general
- Commands: Camp Lejeune; Department of the Pacific; 2nd Marine Division; 1st Provisional Marine Brigade; China Marines
- Conflicts: Veracruz Expedition; World War I Haitian Campaign; Nicaraguan Campaign World War II: Occupation of Iceland; Guadalcanal Campaign

John Marston VI (August 3, 1884 – November 25, 1957) was a United States Marine Corps major general, who is most noted as being the commanding general of the 1st Provisional Marine Brigade during the Occupation of Iceland and commanding general of the 2nd Marine Division at Guadalcanal during World War II.

== Early life and family ==
John Marston VI was born on August 3, 1884, in Somerset County, Pennsylvania, to a family with a long military tradition. His great-great-great-grandfather John Marston I (1715–1786) was a captain with the 3rd Massachusetts Bay Artillery and participated in the Siege of Louisburg in the War of the Austrian Succession. Marston's great-great-grandfather John Marston II (1756–1846) served as a major in the Massachusetts Militia during the American Revolutionary War, and his great-grandfather was John Marston III, who commanded the steam frigate USS Roanoke during the Battle of Hampton Roads in the American Civil War and was eventually promoted to rear admiral after the war.

Only Marston's father, John Marston V, did not serve in the military. He worked as a chief engineer in Williamsport and North Branch Railroad Company. Marston VI attended the University of Pennsylvania, as his father had, and graduated in June 1904 or "in the class of 1905". However, Marston chose to serve his country as his ancestors had, and entered the Marine Corps on June 4, 1908. Because of his university education, he was appointed a second lieutenant on the same date.

After his appointment to the Marine Corps, Marston attended Marine School of Application in Washington, D.C. After graduating in January 1909, he sailed for shore duty to Hawaii, where he served at the Marine barracks in Honolulu until October. He was subsequently transferred to Portsmouth Naval Prison, Maine, where he served within the Marine barracks until May 1912. During his time there, he was promoted to the rank of first lieutenant in March 1911.

Marston was subsequently assigned to the Marine detachment aboard the battleship USS Michigan (BB-27) and remained there until he was transferred to the Marine barracks at Philadelphia Navy Yard. While stationed there, he was assigned to the Advanced Base Force within the 1st Brigade of Marines and sailed for Veracruz, Mexico in April 1914. He subsequently served with occupation forces until the summer of 1915.

During August 1915, then-Lieutenant Marston was sent to Haiti within the Garde d'Haïti and participated in the Battle of Fort Rivière. During the battle, he commanded a small detachment of Benét–Mercié machine guns and covered the advance of Major Smedley Butler and his men. He served on Haiti until August 1918, when he returned to the United States. While serving in Haiti, Marston was promoted to captain on August 29, 1916.

== Interwar period ==
After his return to the United States, he was appointed commanding officer of Marine detachment within the Naval Academy at Annapolis, Maryland. Following two years of service there, Marston was promoted to the rank of major on July 22, 1920, and transferred to the Marine Barracks Quantico, Virginia. From 1922 to 1924, he was assigned to the American legation in Managua, Nicaragua. Other postings followed, including a brief return to Nicaragua. Then he was assigned to the American embassy in Peiping, where he was the commander of the Marine detachment from 1937 to 1938 and the senior commander of Marine forces in North China from 1938 to 1939.

== World War II ==
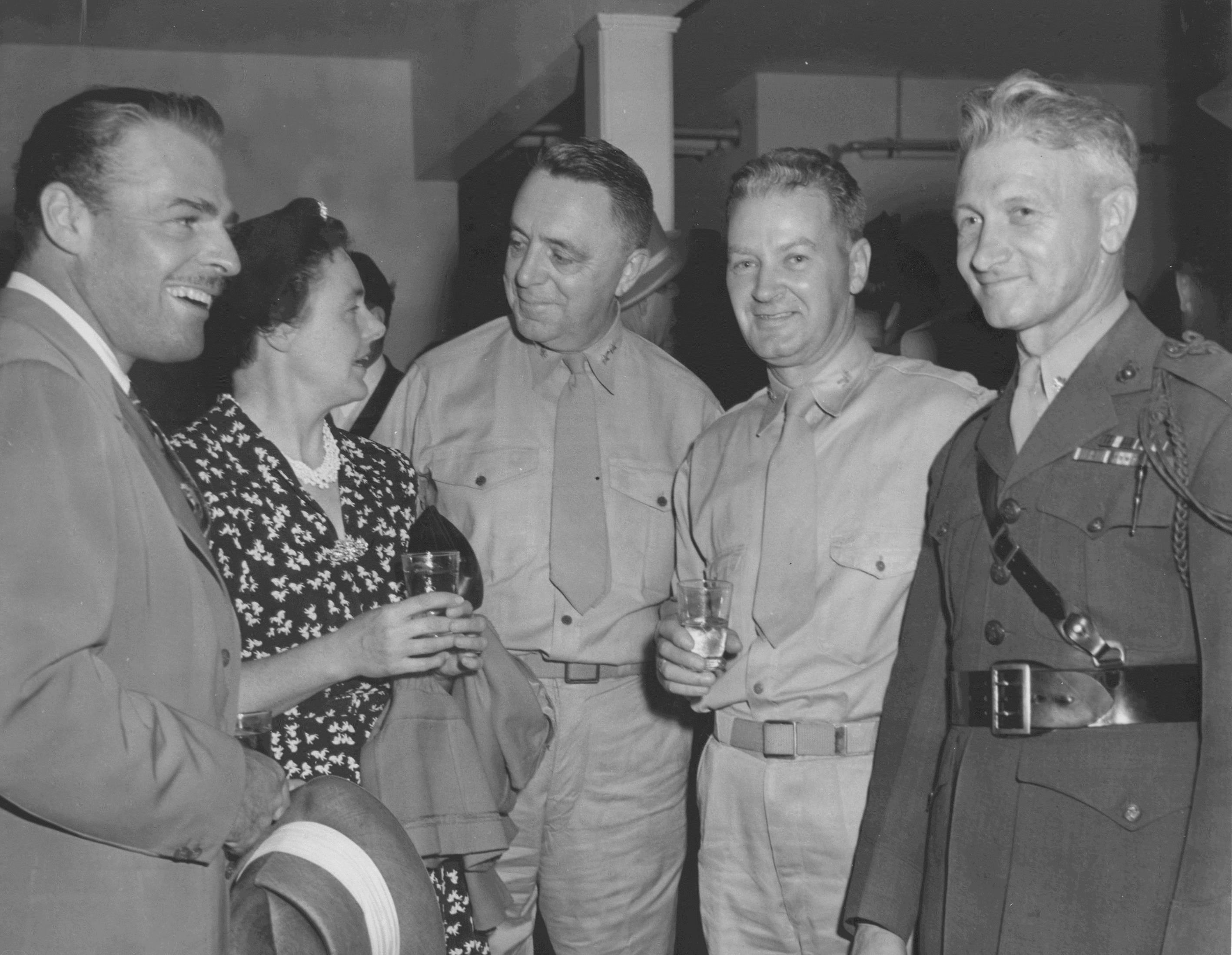
Wake Island premiere, San Diego, August 24, 1942. L to R: Actor Brian Donlevy, Mrs. Venepha P. Hermle, Major General John Marston, Colonel Leo D. Hermle, and Major Raymond W. Hanson.

With the increasing threat of German occupation of Iceland in May 1940, the British government sent Royal Marines under the command of Colonel Robert Sturges to prevent Germany from occupying strategic islands in the Atlantic Ocean. Because of the critical need for troops on other battlefields, Great Britain requested that the United States occupy Iceland in June 1941, which was approved. The 1st Provisional Marine Brigade was reactivated under the command of Brigadier General Marston and sailed on June 22 for Iceland from Charleston, South Carolina, via Argentia, Newfoundland. The unit arrived in Iceland on July 7 and had fully debarked by July 12. In September, a contingent of US Army reinforcements arrived, bringing with it a complication: Its commander, Charles Hartwell Bonesteel, Jr., was senior to Marston, so (over the objections of Marine Corps Commandant Thomas Holcomb) Marston's unit was "detached for service with the Army by order of the President", the only time in World War II that a Marine Corps unit was detached from the Navy to the Army. A battalion of Marines was relieved and left Iceland on January 31, 1942, but it was not until March 4 that the rest of the brigade began embarking for its departure. On March 8, Marston relocated his command post from shore to the USS McCawley, restoring the brigade to Navy jurisdiction. The unit reached New York on March 25, where it was immediately disbanded. Its component units were transferred to the 2nd Marine Division, and Marston was appointed its commanding general on April 15, 1942. In this capacity, he succeeded Brigadier General Joseph C. Fegan Sr. Marston was also promoted to the rank of major general on March 20 or 21, 1942.

The 2nd Division was ordered to the Pacific theater, arriving on American Samoa in September 1942. The division subsequently participated in Battle of Guadalcanal, but Marston personally was ordered to stay in New Zealand. The main reason for this order was to maintain a good relationship with the United States Army, because the Guadalcanal Campaign should be an Army operation and General Marston was senior to the commander of XIV Corps, Major General Alexander Patch. He relinquished his command to his assistant division commander, Brigadier General Alphonse DeCarre. After a few months in the Pacific, Marston was ordered back to the United States in April 1943.

After his arrival, he was diagnosed with malaria and sent to Naval Hospital San Diego for treatment. Following his recovery, he was appointed Commander of Marine Activities in San Diego area, with headquarters at Camp Elliott. During August 1943, he was appointed commanding general of Department of the Pacific, succeeding Major General William P. Upshur, who was killed in an air crash near Sitka, Alaska.

Marston served in this capacity until April 20, 1944, when he was appointed commanding general of Camp Lejeune, North Carolina. He remained in this position for the rest of the war and finally retired from the Marine Corps in 1946.

After his retirement, Marston lived in Lexington, Virginia, and died on November 25, 1957. He is buried at local Oak Grove Cemetery together with his wife, Elizabeth Worthington Marston (1889–1961). They had one son, John Marston VII (1917–1978), who also served in the Marine Corps and was decorated with the Silver Star while serving with the 6th Marine Division on Okinawa. Marston VII retired as a lieutenant colonel.

== Military awards ==
The following are Major General Marston's decorations and awards. It is not clear whether Marston received any decorations for merit during World War II.

1st Row	Marine Corps Expeditionary Medal with two 3/16" bronze stars		Mexican Service Medal	
2nd Row	Haitian Campaign Medal	World War I Victory Medal with West Indies clasp	Second Nicaraguan Campaign Medal	China Service Medal
3rd Row	American Defense Service Medal with "A" Device	American Campaign Medal	European–African–Middle Eastern Campaign Medal	Asiatic-Pacific Campaign Medal with one 3/16" bronze star
4th Row	World War II Victory Medal	Nicaraguan Presidential Medal of Merit with Diploma	Nicaraguan Cross of Valor	Nicaraguan Medal for Merit

== Military offices ==
Military offices
Preceded by William P. Upshur	Commanding General of the Department of the Pacific; August 1, 1943 - April 20, 1944	Succeeded by Joseph C. Fegan Sr.
Preceded by Joseph C. Fegan Sr.	Commanding General of the 2nd Marine Division; April 1, 1942 – April 30, 1943	Succeeded by Julian C. Smith
