= Leo D. Hermle =

U.S. Marine Corps Lieutenant General

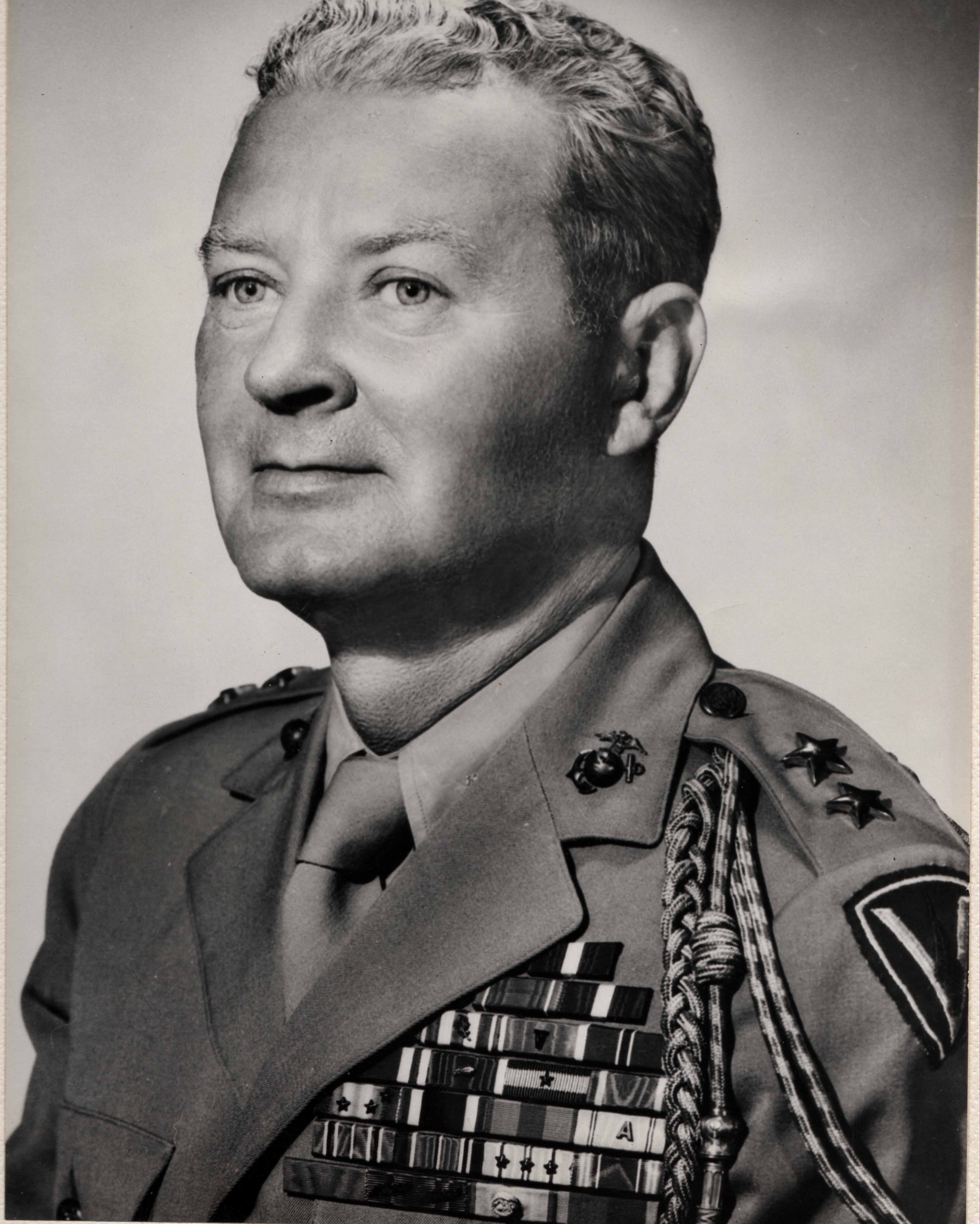
- Major General Leo D. Hermle, USMC
- Born: June 30, 1890; Hastings, Nebraska, U.S.
- Died: January 21, 1976 (aged 85); San Diego, California, U.S.
- Military career
- Allegiance: United States
- Branch: United States Marine Corps
- Service years: 1917–1949
- Rank: Lieutenant General
- Nickname: "Dutch"
- Service number: 0-420
- Commands: Marine Corps Recruit Depot San Diego; 6th Marine Regiment; 8th Marine Regiment
- Conflicts: World War I; Second Battle of the Marne; Battle of Saint-Mihiel; Meuse-Argonne Offensive; Battle of Blanc Mont Ridge; Banana Wars; Occupation of Haiti; World War II; Invasion of Iceland; Guadalcanal Campaign; Battle of Tarawa; Battle of Iwo Jima
- Awards: Navy Cross; Distinguished Service Cross; Navy Distinguished Service Medal; Silver Star (2); Legion of Merit; Bronze Star Medal
- Other work: Professor of Law, University of San Diego

Leo David "Dutch" Hermle (June 30, 1890 – January 21, 1976) was a highly decorated officer in the United States Marine Corps with the rank of lieutenant general. He was a recipient of Army and Navy second highest decorations, Navy Cross and Distinguished Service Cross, which he earned during his service in both World Wars.

== World War I ==
Leo Hermle was born in 1890 in Hastings, Nebraska. He attended the University of California, Hastings College of the Law in San Francisco, California, where he earned first a Bachelor of Arts degree and then the degree of Doctor of Jurisprudence. He subsequently reported for active duty in the Marine Corps and was commissioned a second lieutenant on August 15, 1917.

Hermle was assigned to the 74th Company, 1st Battalion of the 6th Marine Regiment, and sent to the France. His company was sent to the frontline in the Toulon Sector near Verdun in March 1918. A month later, the Germans used combat gas and Hermle was wounded by its effects. After recovery, Hermle was promoted to the rank of first lieutenant and appointed a platoon leader in the 74th Company in the 1st Battalion. He participated in the Battle of Saint-Mihiel and was decorated with the Silver Star for heroism in action near the town of Thiaucourt. He continued to command his platoon, and at the beginning of the October 1918, he led a successful assault up the hill at the Blanc Mont and was decorated with his second Silver Star.

During the ongoing Meuse-Argonne Offensive, Hermle commanded his platoon in action near the town of Saint Georges, where he showed great courage and initiative in maneuvering a large number of the enemy and capturing the town of Saint Georges together with 155 prisoners and seventeen machine guns. Although he was wounded, he remained in command for the next two days, until he was ordered to the infirmary in the rear area. For his actions, Hermle was decorated with the Distinguished Service Cross and the Navy Distinguished Service Medal on November 1, 1918. He was also made a Chevalier of the Légion d'honneur and decorated with the Croix de guerre 1914-1918 with palm and Fourragère by the Government of France.

== Interwar period ==
Hermle stayed with the occupation forces in Germany until July 1919, when he was ordered back to the United States. Following his return, Hermle was assigned to the Marine barracks at Mare Island Naval Shipyard, California, where he was appointed an intelligence officer and legal aide to the commander of the Barracks. Because of his legal education, he was transferred to the office of Judge Advocate General of the Navy in Washington, D.C., in November 1921.

Hermle, now a captain, was transferred to the armored cruiser USS Seattle in June 1924. He was appointed commanding officer of the Marine detachment on the Seattle.

Following his return home from duties at sea, Hermle attended the Company Officers course and Field Officers course at the Marine Corps Schools at Marine Corps Base Quantico, Virginia. Upon graduation in June 1928, Hermle served as an instructor at that base.

In May 1930, Hermle was assigned to the Constabulary Detachment within the Garde d'Haïti and spent the next four years as assistant chief of staff of the Constabulary Detachment at Port-au-Prince. Later he also served as chief of the Inspector Department. When the United States occupation of Haiti ended, Hermle sailed home with the last Marine units in August 1934. For his service there, he was awarded with the Haitian Distinguished Service Medal with Diploma and Haitian Order of Merit in the Grade of Officer.

Upon his return to the United States, Hermle was assigned to the Headquarters Marine Corps, Washington, D.C., and appointed assistant adjutant and inspector. After four years of service there, he was assigned as a student at the Army War College in Washington, D.C., in 1938.

== World War II ==
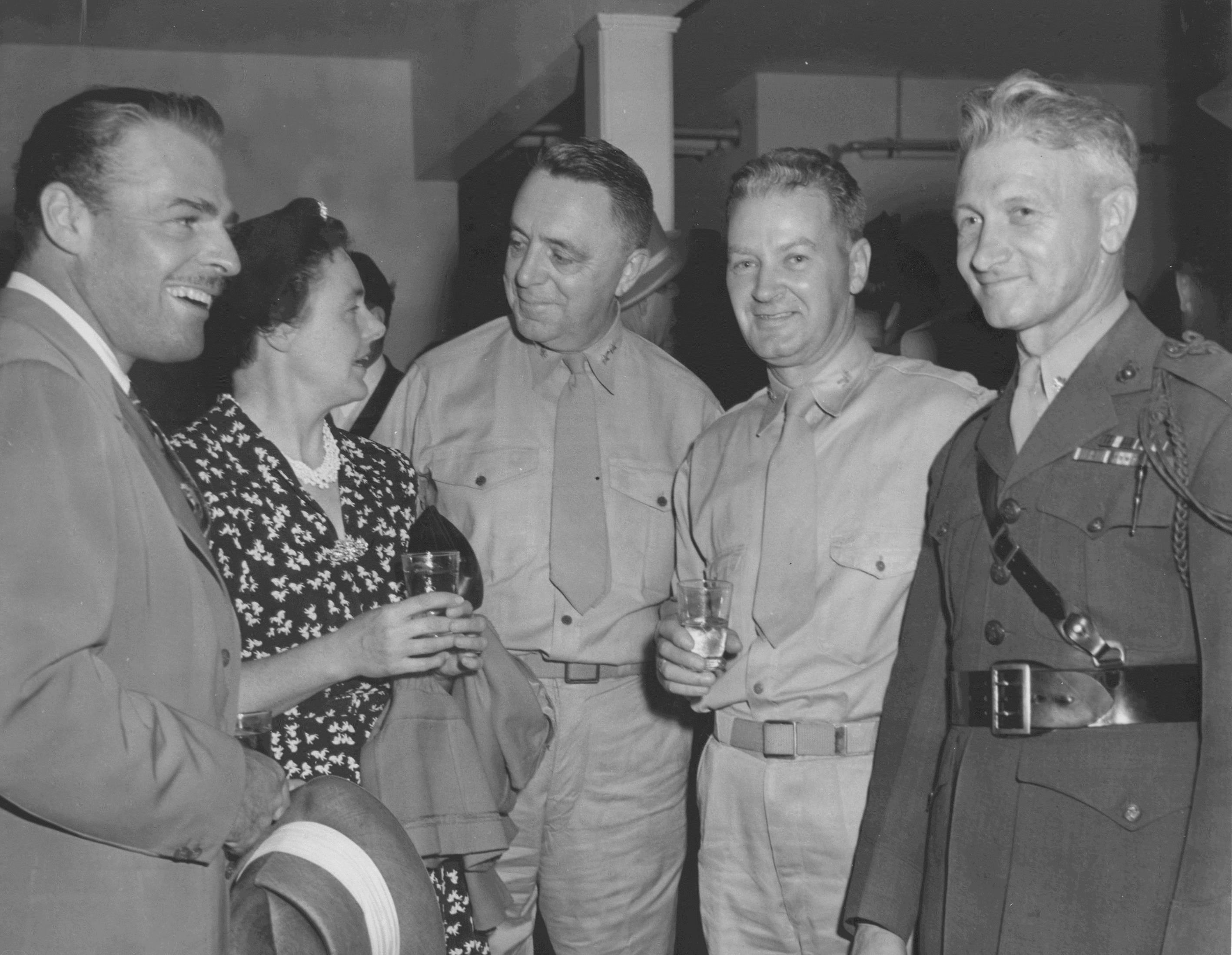
Wake Island Premiere, San Diego, August 24, 1942. L to R: Actor Brian Donlevy, Mrs. Venepha P. Hermle, Major General John Marston, Colonel Leo D. Hermle, Major Raymond W. Hanson.

After graduation from Advanced course at Army War College in June 1939, he was transferred to the 6th Marine Regiment stationed at Marine Corps Base in San Diego, where he became regimental executive officer. In this capacity, he was promoted to the rank of colonel on April 1, 1940, and appointed commanding officer of 8th Marine Regiment. A year later, in May 1941, Hermle was made a commanding officer of the 6th Marine Regiment.

The 6th Marines was subsequently sent to Iceland in June 1941 as a part of 1st Provisional Marine Brigade under the command Brigadier General John Marston. Hermle later also served additional duty as chief of staff of the 1st Provisional Marine Brigade. He stayed on Iceland until the end of March 1942, when the whole brigade was transferred back to the United States. For his service in this capacity, Colonel Hermle was decorated with Navy Commendation Medal.

When 1st Provisional Marine Brigade was disbanded, 6th Marine Regiment with Colonel Hermle in command was assigned to the 2nd Marine Division again under General John Marston's command. In August 1942, Marston chose Hermle as his Division's Chief of Staff.

Hermle sailed with 2nd Marine Division to the Pacific Theater in November 1942 and participated in the Guadalcanal Campaign. Hermle was promoted to the rank of brigadier general in September 1942 and was appointed assistant division commander of the 2nd Division under Major General Julian C. Smith's command.

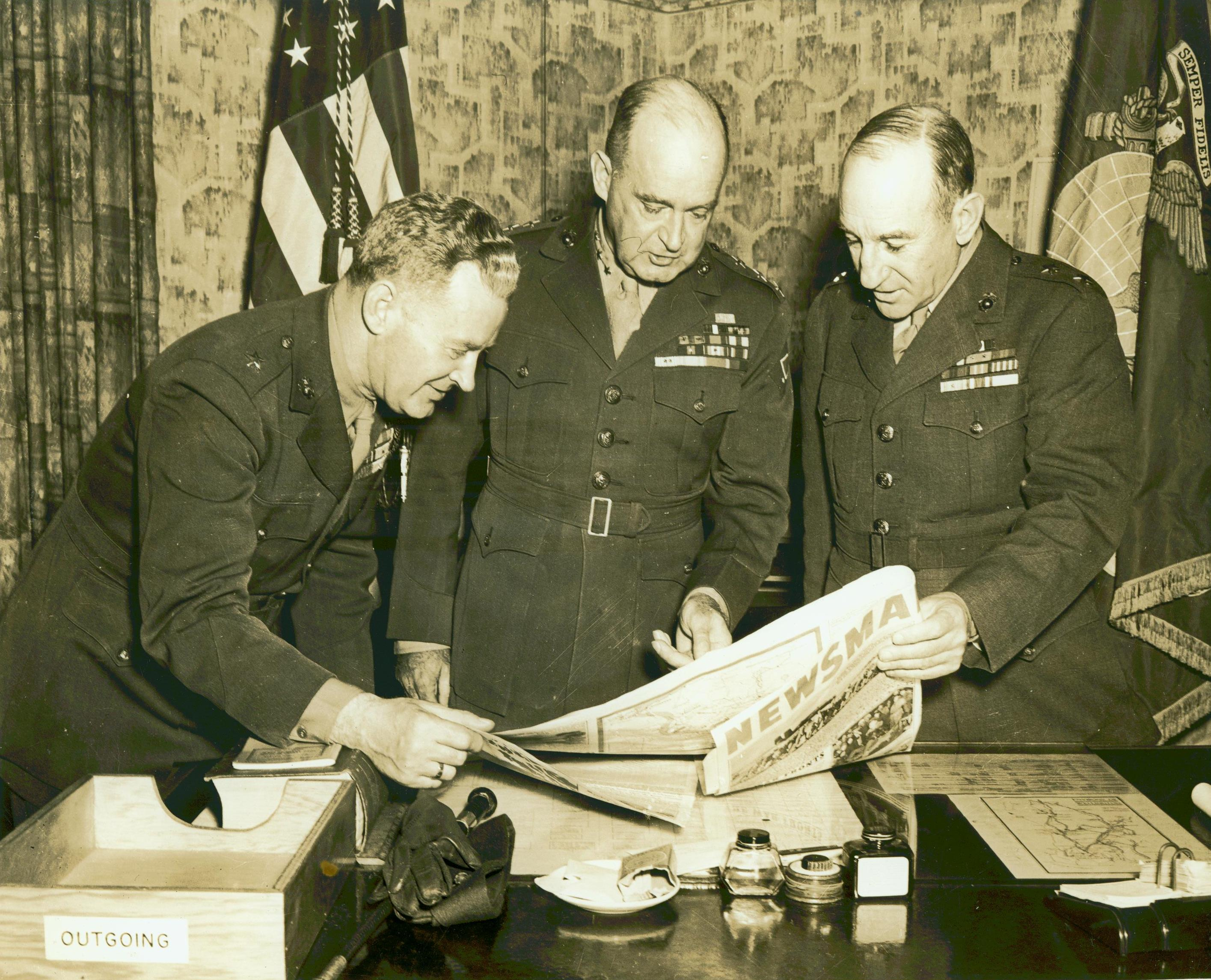
Leo D. Hermle, Alexander Vandegrift, and Julian C. Smith look at a Newsmap while the 2nd Marine Division was stationed in New Zealand during World War II.

During the initial part of the Tarawa Battle, Brigadier General Hermle was sent ashore by his commanding officer, Major General Smith, to collect information and took over tactical command. Hermle stayed in the landing zone in the lagoon awaiting further instructions. All communications failed and Hermle was unable to reach Colonel David M. Shoup's headquarters, where the defense was coordinated. He remained in the lagoon and supervised arrival of reserve troops and supplies, as well as evacuation of wounded under heavy enemy fire. He later planned and commanded the landing operations at Abemama. For his efforts during Tarawa and Abemama operations, Hermle was decorated with the Legion of Merit with Combat "V". He also received the Navy Presidential Unit Citation, when the President decorated 2nd Marine Division for its efforts at Tarawa.

In January 1944, Hermle was transferred to the staff of the V Amphibious Corps under command of Lieutenant General Holland M. Smith, where he served as administrative deputy. He served in this capacity until April 1944, when he was transferred back to the United States. He was then assigned to 5th Marine Division stationed at Camp Pendleton, California. There he was appointed assistant division commander under the command of Major General Keller E. Rockey.

The 5th Marine Division was sent to the Pacific Theater in August of the same year. After a few months of additional training at Camp Tarawa, Hawaii, 5th Marine Division left for Iwo Jima in January 1945. Hermle landed with the first waves of troops of his division on February 19, 1945. He established an advanced division command post and led his troops toward the Motoyama Airfield Number One. When his unit was pinned down by the enemy fire, he wasn't hesitant to go directly to the frontline foxholes to obtain first-hand information.

When most of the enemy units retreated to the north of the island, where they took last-stand defensive positions, Brigadier General Hermle directed coordinated attacks which caused heavy losses to the enemy.

For his leadership of the 5th Marine Division's troops during the Battle of Iwo Jima and its capture, General Hermle was decorated with the Navy Cross. He also received his second Navy Presidential Unit Citation and also the Navy Unit Commendation. He was subsequently transferred to Mariana Islands, where he was appointed deputy island commander of Guam Island Command in June 1945. For his service in this capacity, he was decorated with the Bronze Star Medal.

== Post-war career ==
Hermle was appointed island commander in February 1946 and served in this capacity until July 1946, when he was ordered back to the United States. After his arrival, he was appointed commanding officer of Marine Corps Recruit Depot San Diego, California. He replaced Brigadier General Gilder D. Jackson Jr. in this capacity. He was promoted to the rank of major general during his service in this capacity.

Hermle retired from the Marine Corps on September 1, 1949. He was also advanced to the rank of lieutenant general on the retired list for having been specially commended in combat. Following his retirement from the military, Hermle served as professor of law at University of San Diego. He also served as state recreation commissioner for 11 years. He retired again in 1973.

Hermle died on January 21, 1976, in La Jolla near San Diego, California. He is buried together with his wife at El Camino Memorial Park.

== Decorations ==

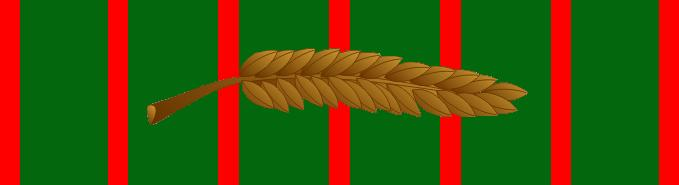

1st Row	Navy Cross		Distinguished Service Cross	
2nd Row	Navy Distinguished Service Medal	Silver Star with Oak Leaf Cluster	Legion of Merit with Combat "V"	Bronze Star Medal
3rd Row	Purple Heart with Oak Leaf Cluster	Navy Commendation Medal	Navy Presidential Unit Citation with one star	Navy Unit Commendation
4th Row	Marine Corps Expeditionary Medal	World War I Victory Medal with four battle clasps	Army of Occupation of Germany Medal	American Defense Service Medal with "A" Device
5th Row	European–African–Middle Eastern Campaign Medal	American Campaign Medal	Asiatic-Pacific Campaign Medal with three service stars	World War II Victory Medal
6th Row	Chevalier of the Légion d'honneur	French Croix de guerre 1914-1918 with palm	Haitian Order of Honour and Merit, Officer	Haitian Distinguished Service Medal with Diploma

=== Navy Cross citation ===
Citation:

The President of the United States of America takes pleasure in presenting the Navy Cross to Brigadier General Leo D. Hermle (MCSN: 0-420), United States Marine Corps, for extraordinary heroism as Assistant Commanding General of the FIFTH Marine Division, in action against enemy Japanese forces on Iwo Jima, Volcano Islands, from 19 February to 26 March 1945. Landing early on the afternoon of 19 February, under a heavy concentration of enemy fire, Brigadier General Hermle established an Advanced Division Command Post. When communication with the assault combat teams was extremely difficult and vital information was needed to coordinate a resumption of the attack for the establishment of an initial beachhead, he courageously crossed one hundred and fifty yards of open area of Motoyama Airfield Number One, while it was being swept by enemy fire to visit the front line units and obtained the necessary first-hand information needed. When the enemy took last-stand defensive positions consisting of steel-doored caves and concrete emplacements in the cliffs of a gorge in the northern part of the Island, he skillfully directed a coordinated attack which resulted in heavy losses to the enemy. Brigadier General Hermle's gallant spirit, initiative and unwavering devotion to duty were in keeping with the highest traditions of the United States Naval Service.

=== Distinguished Service Cross citation ===
Citation:

The President of the United States of America, authorized by Act of Congress, July 9, 1918, takes pleasure in presenting the Distinguished Service Cross to First Lieutenant Leo D. Hermle (MCSN: 0-420), United States Marine Corps, for extraordinary heroism while serving with the Sixth Regiment (Marines), 2d Division, A.E.F., in action near the Meuse River, France, 1 November 1918. When the company on his left was checked by heavy machine-gun fire, Lieutenant Hermle led a platoon forward and surrounded a large number of the enemy, capturing 155 prisoners and 17 machine guns. Pushing on, he took the town of St. Georges and many machine-gun positions. Although he was painfully wounded he refused to be evacuated, and remained with his men for two days until he was ordered to the rear.
