= 6th Marine Regiment =

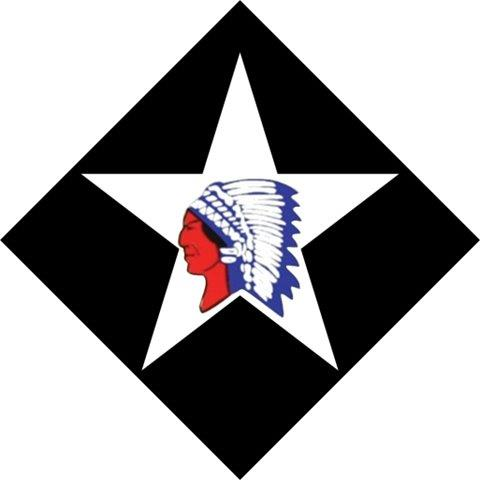
- 6th Marines insignia
- Active: 1917 – 1919; 1921 – 1925; 1927 – 1929; 1934 – 1947; 1947 – 1949; 1949 – present
- Country: United States of America
- Branch: United States Marine Corps
- Type: Infantry regiment
- Part of: 2nd Marine Division; II Marine Expeditionary Force
- Garrison/HQ: MCB Camp Lejeune
- Nickname: "Fighting 6th Marines"
- Motto: Keep Moving
- Engagements: World War I; Battle of Belleau Wood; Battle of Soissons; Battle of Saint-Mihiel; Battle of Blanc Mont Ridge; Meuse-Argonne offensive; World War II; Pacific War; Battle of Guadalcanal; Battle of Tarawa; Battle of Saipan; Battle of Tinian; Battle of Okinawa; Operation Desert Storm; War on terror; Operation Enduring Freedom; Iraq War; Operation Freedom's Sentinel; Operation Inherent Resolve

Commanders
- Current commander: Col Neil R. Berry
- Notable commanders: Leo D. Hermle; Gilder D. Jackson Jr. Gregon A. Williams; Ormond R. Simpson; William M. Keys James E. Livingston; Maurice G. Holmes Russell H. Sutton; Lawrence H. Livingston; Robert Neller; Austin Shofner; Harold G. Glasgow; Richard Huck; Carl E. Mundy III

The 6th Marine Regiment (also referred to as "6th Marines") is an infantry regiment of the United States Marine Corps based at Marine Corps Base Camp Lejeune, North Carolina. The regiment falls under the command of the 2nd Marine Division of the II Marine Expeditionary Force. Its combat history dates back to World War I when they were part of the American Expeditionary Force. They fought in the Pacific Theater in World War II, most notably at the battles of Guadalcanal, Tarawa, Saipan, Tinian and Okinawa. More recently, the regiment has seen combat during the Gulf War and in support of Operation Iraqi Freedom.

== Subordinate units ==
The regiment comprises four (five during war) organic infantry battalions and one headquarters company:

- Headquarters Company 6th Marines (HQ/6)
- 1st Battalion, 6th Marines (1/6)
- 2nd Battalion, 6th Marines (2/6)
- 3rd Battalion, 6th Marines (3/6)
- 1st Battalion, 8th Marines (1/8)
- 2nd Battalion, 9th Marines (2/9; during wartime only, when activated)

== History ==
=== World War I ===
The 6th Marine Regiment was first organized at Marine Corps Base Quantico, Virginia, on 11 July 1917, three months after the American entry into World War I, under the command of Medal of Honor holder Colonel Albertus W. Catlin. The regiment included three battalions: the 1st (74th, 75th, 76th, and 95th Companies), the 2nd (78th, 79th, 80th, and 96th Companies), and the 3rd (82nd, 83rd, 84th, and 97th Companies). Virtually all of the senior officers and staff non-commissioned officers of the 6th Marines were long-service professionals, while most junior officers and all privates were new enlistees. Although the new men were short on experience, they were long on education: Colonel Catlin estimated that 60% of them were college men. Regimental increments arrived in France during late 1917 and early 1918. Upon arrival, the 6th Marines joined the 5th Marine Regiment and the 6th Machine Gun Battalion to form the 4th Brigade, U.S. 2nd Division (Regular), American Expeditionary Force. The early spring was devoted to training under French tutelage. The "Marine" Brigade entered the trenches of the Toulon Sector near Verdun in March 1918, where it suffered its first combat casualties. The regiment had 33 men killed while in the trenches, most lost when the 74th Company billeting area was gassed on 13 April 1918.

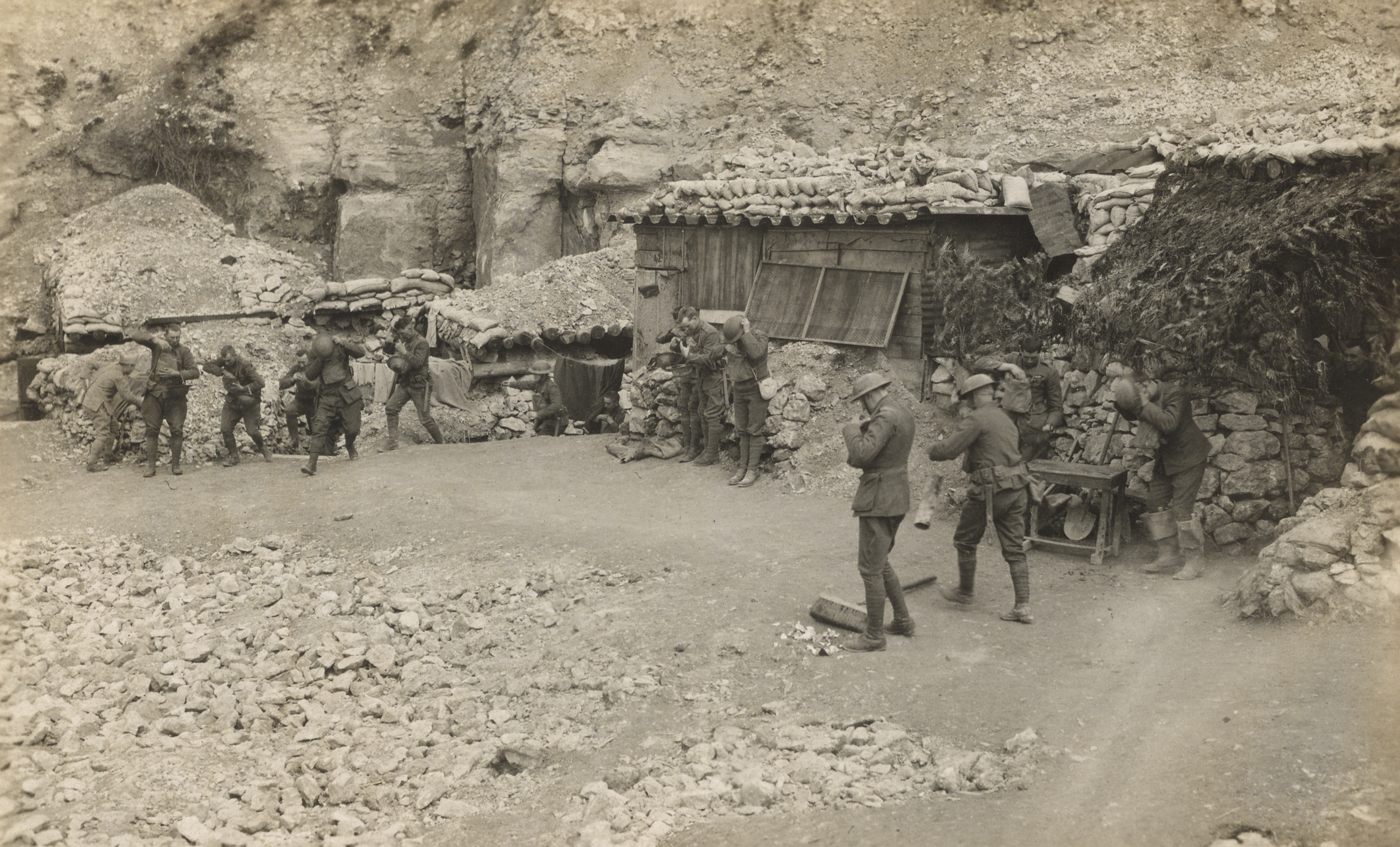
Men of the 6th Marine Regiment at the front, responding to a gas alarm at Verdun, France, April 30, 1918.

The 4th Brigade was ordered to shore up crumbling French lines near Château-Thierry in late May 1918. The 6th Marines took up positions southwest of Belleau Wood, then it was ordered to seize the town of Bouresches and to clear the southern half of Belleau Wood itself on 6 June. These attacks were the beginning of a month-long struggle that eventually became a landmark battle for the U.S. Marine Corps. Colonel Catlin was severely wounded not long after the first waves went over the top; his replacement was Lieutenant Colonel Harry Lee, who would command the regiment for the rest of the war. Gunnery Sergeant Fred W. Stockham voluntarily gave up his own gas mask to a platoonmate and was later awarded a posthumous Medal of Honor for that action. Regimental dentist Weedon Osborne was also awarded a posthumous Medal of Honor. Regimental losses in this sector were 2,143 over 40 days. In recognition of the "brilliant courage, vigor, spirit, and tenacity of the Marines", the French government awarded Marine units at Belleau Wood the Croix de Guerre with Palm and renamed Belleau Wood "Bois de la Brigade de Marine."

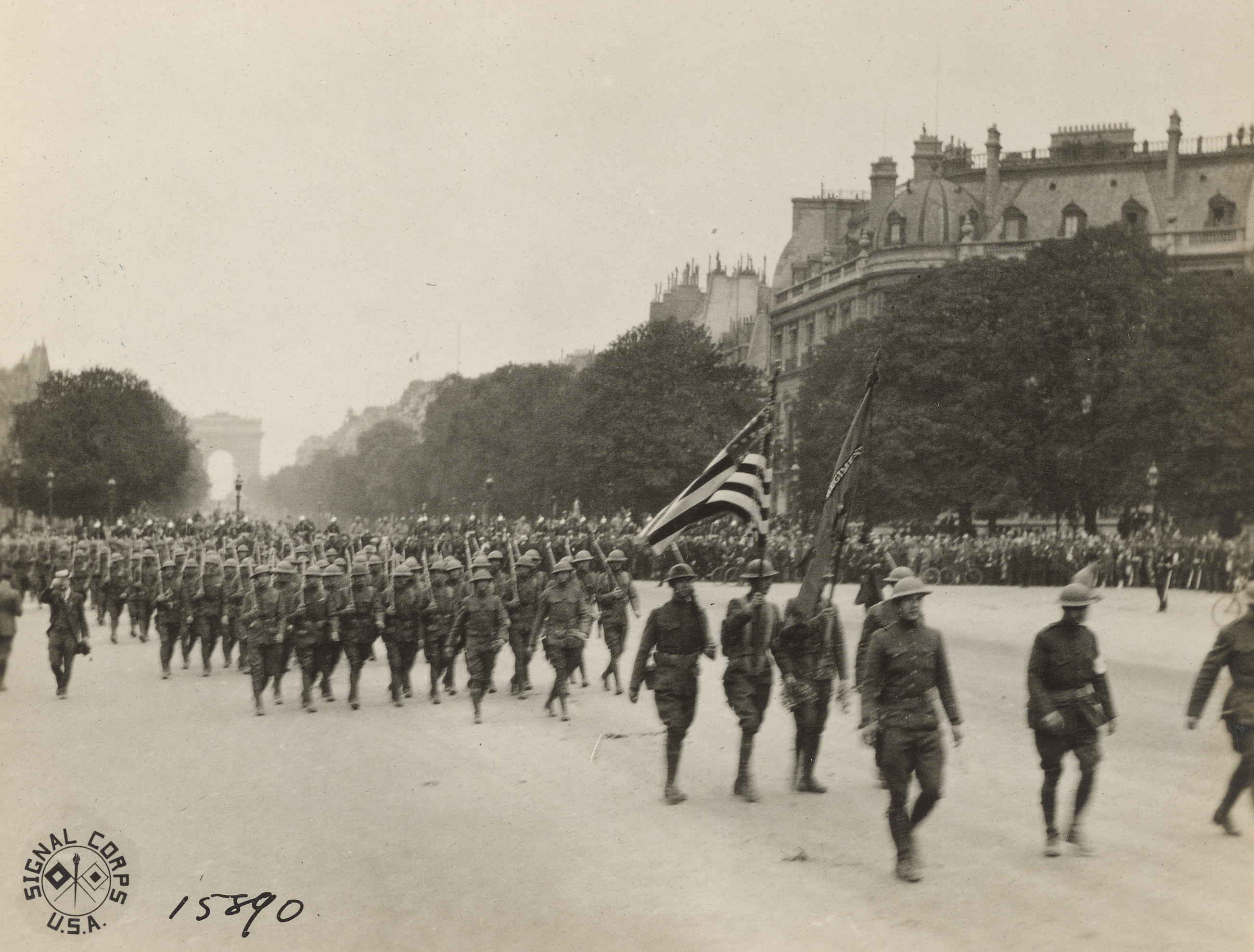
Men of the 6th Marine Regiment turn into the Champs Elysese toward Place de la Concorde, Independence Day parade, Paris, France, July 4, 1918.

The U.S. 2nd Division was attached to the French XX Corps to conduct a counterattack near Soissons in mid-July. The 6th Regiment was held in reserve when the initial assault waves went over the top on 18 July. The next day, the 6th Marine Regiment stepped off, advancing alone from Vierzy toward Tigny, but was stopped short of the objective by intense artillery and machinegun fire. Casualties were extremely heavy, estimated at 50 to 70% in most units. First Lieutenant Clifton B. Cates (a future commandant of the Marine Corps) reported only about two dozen of more than 400 men survived and added "... There is no one on my left, and only a few on my right. I will hold." Regimental losses during the Aisne-Marne Offensive numbered 1,431; 19 July 1918 is the single costliest day of fighting in the history of the 6th Marine Regiment. Two Navy medical personnel attached to the 6th Regiment received Medals of Honor for their actions at Soissons: future admiral Joel T. Boone and corpsman John H. Balch.

After a month-long rest, the Marines were assigned to the U.S. First Army to participate in the first "all-American" push, a double envelopment to eliminate the St. Mihiel salient. The 6th Marines was relegated to support the 3rd Brigade's attack from Limey to Thiaucourt. The push began early on 12 September, and the initial attack carried virtually all of the division's objectives before noon that day. The American attack unknowingly coincided with a German withdrawal. The sharpest action for the Regiment occurred when defending the outpost line of resistance on 15 September. Although this mission has been tagged "a piece of cake" by some historians, the 6th Marines lost more than a hundred killed and about five hundred wounded at St. Mihiel; Navy corpsman David E. Hayden earned a Medal of Honor for his heroic actions while attached to the 6th Marines defending Thiaucourt.

The 2nd Division and the US 36th Division were then loaned to the French Fourth Army for its assault on German forces that became the Battle of Blanc Mont Ridge. Here the Marines successfully captured their objectives after bloody fighting, and with support from the 36th Division fought off German counterattacks until the flanking French units were able to catch up to the American advance. The 2nd and 36th Divisions then advanced and captured a German strongpoint at St. Etienne, after which the 2nd was withdrawn from the line to regroup and returned to American command.

For the actions at Belleau Wood, Soissons, and Blanc Mont, the 6th Marine Regiment was awarded the French croix de guerre three times. As a result, the regiment is authorized to wear the fourragère of the croix de guerre (seen in the unit's logo), one of only two units in the Marine Corps so honored (the other being the 5th Marine Regiment). The fourragère thereafter became part of the uniform of the unit, and all members of the modern 6th Marines are authorized to wear the fourragère while serving with the regiment.

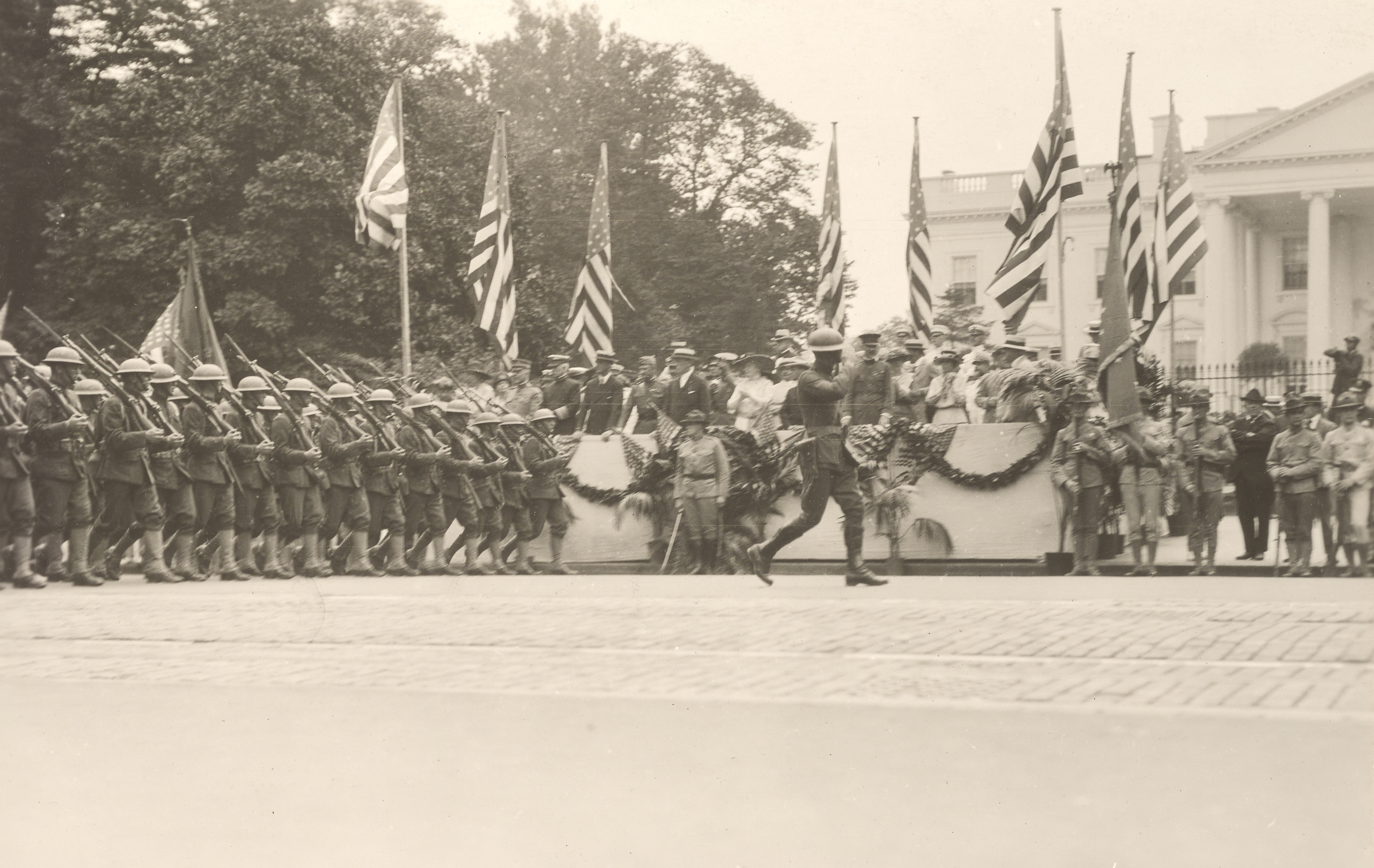
Men of the 6th Marine Regiment, 4th Marine Brigade, 2nd Division, being reviewed by President Woodrow Wilson at Washington, D.C., August 12, 1919.

When the armistice on 11 November 1918, ended active hostilities, the 6th Regiment was assigned to the U.S. Third Army to spearhead the Allied march from France through Belgium and Luxembourg to Coblenz, Germany. There, the regiment settled into uneventful occupation duty from December 1918 to May 1919. At that time, the regiment once again deployed for hostilities when the German representatives balked at the unexpected terms of surrender. This threat persuaded the Germans to accept to the terms, and the treaties formally ending the war were signed in June 1919. Their mission accomplished, the Marines sailed for home the following month.

The 6th Marines was deactivated at Quantico on 13 August 1919 after victoriously parading through the streets of New York City and Washington, D.C. Thomas Boyd's novel Through The Wheat. covers the activities of the 6th Marine Regiment during the First World War.

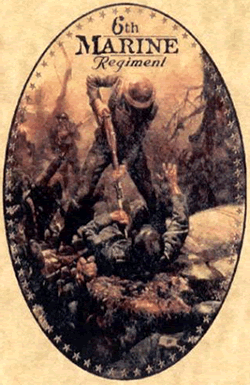
Watercolor painting by Colonel Waterhouse of the action at the Battle of Belleau Wood

=== Between the World Wars ===
The 6th Marine Regiment was reactivated in 1921 at Marine Base Quantico where it was brigaded with the 5th Regiment. Together, these storied units conducted training and made national headlines by participating in a series of much-heralded summer maneuvers that recreated famous Civil War battles (Wilderness, Gettysburg, Antietam, and New Market) using modern tactics and equipment. Elements of the regiment were called on to reinforce occupation forces in Cuba and the Dominican Republic in 1924. The regiment was once again inactivated in March 1925.
Two years later, civil strife tore through China threatening American lives and property. This danger required an increased military presence to forestall violence and disorder. As a result, a new 6th Regiment was activated at Philadelphia for duty with the 3rd Provisional Brigade in China. No major incidents occurred in 1928 so in 1929 the China Marines were either reassigned or sent home. The colors of the 6th Regiment returned to San Diego where the unit was officially dissolved. The regiment was reactivated on 1 September 1934 as part of the Fleet Marine Force.

=== World War II ===
When the U.S. entered World War II in December 1941, the 6th Marines was temporarily detached from its parent 2nd Marine Division to garrison Iceland while assigned to the 1st Provisional Marine Brigade. The Brigade was disbanded on 25 March in New York City. The 6th Marines was reassigned to the 2nd Marine Division at San Diego before sailing for the South Pacific. After a brief stay in New Zealand, the 6th Marines landed at Guadalcanal on 4 January 1943 where it was temporarily reunited with the 2nd and 8th Marines. The 6th Marines, fighting as part of a provisional Army-Marine division after the bulk of the 2nd Marine Division departed, participated in the final American offensive on Guadalcanal advancing from Kokumbona to Cape Esperance and eliminating the last remaining enemy forces. The 6th Marines suffered 223 casualties (53 killed in action/died of wounds, 170 wounded in action) during its six weeks on the "Canal".

The regiment then returned to New Zealand to refit for the upcoming Operation Galvanic, the capture of the Gilbert Islands in the Central Pacific. This time the target was Tarawa Atoll. The 6th Marines, once again part of the 2nd Marine Division, was the V Amphibious Corps floating reserve. The assault waves stormed ashore on 20 November 1943 but ran into stiff resistance. Casualties were so heavy that the entire division reserve was committed on the first day. The 6th Marines was ordered ashore the following morning. The 1st and 3rd Battalions landed across Betio's Green Beach and were ordered to drive the length of the island, the 2nd Battalion was used as a blocking force on nearby Bairiki Island. Betio was declared secure after 76 bloody hours. The 1st and 3rd Battalions mounted out for a new rest camp in Hawaii, but the 2nd Battalion stayed on to clear the rest of the atoll. The 6th Marines suffered 355 casualties (99 dead, 256 wounded) and received a Presidential Unit Citation for actions at Tarawa.

Next on the slate was Operation Forager, the capture of the Mariana Islands, which would put American forces within bomber range of Japan. Forager was scheduled for the summer of 1944 with the capture of Saipan and the recapture of Guam set for mid-June and the seizure of Tinian in July. The 6th Marines participated in the Battle of Saipan and the Tinian operation. The regiment landed under heavy fire at Saipan's Red Beach on 15 June. This was the most difficult storm landing in regimental history, two of three battalion commanders were seriously wounded in the first minutes ashore. Early the next morning, the 6th Marines repulsed several tank-supported counterattacks that saved the beachhead. Machine gunner PFC Harold G. Epperson sacrificed his own life by diving on a grenade on 25 June and received a posthumous Medal of Honor for that action. After that, the regiment drove north up the west side of the island through the coastal town of Garapan and on toward Tanapag where the Marines mopped up following the largest Japanese "Banzai" attack of the war. The 3rd Battalion conducted a shore-to-shore landing to seize Manigassa Island that dominated Tanapag Harbor. The regiment spent a couple of weeks clearing out bypassed enemy and concurrently prepared to seize nearby Tinian in July. Saipan was the costliest battle of the Second World War for the 6th Marines: losses were 356 killed, 1208 wounded.

The 6th Marines landed at Tinian on 25 July and joined the rest of the 2nd Marine Division as it elbowed its way down the island until reaching the escarpment that marked Tinian's southern tip on 1 August. It took three days of tough fighting to reduce the final enemy stronghold. During that fighting, PFC Robert L. Wilson covered a live grenade with his body to protect his comrades and earned a posthumous Medal of Honor. The regiment lost 34 killed and 165 wounded in ten days on Tinian.

The 6th Marines returned to Saipan once Tinian was secured. There, the regiment alternated searching for Japanese holdouts, conducting small unit training, and improving habitability while preparing for Operation Iceberg, the seizure of Okinawa which would serve as the final stepping stone on the long road to Tokyo. The 2nd Marine Division was designated the Tenth Army reserve. In April 1945, elements of the 6th Marines were part of the diversion force at Okinawa but returned to Saipan without actually going ashore. Most of the time at Saipan was devoted to preparation for Operation Downfall, the invasion of Japan. The 6th Marines were slated to land on Kyūshū in the fall of 1945. Fortuitously, that operation was not needed when Japan surrendered in August. The 6th Marines made an administrative landing in Japan for occupation duty in September 1945 and remained there for almost a year before returning stateside.

Leon Uris's best-selling 1953 novel Battle Cry, which was also made into a film of the same name in 1955, is about the 2nd Battalion, 6th Marines during the Second World War.

=== Cold War ===
The regiment returned to the United States and joined the Second Marine Division in 1949. Since that time, it has frequently deployed units to the Mediterranean and Caribbean areas. Operation Deep Water was a 1957 NATO naval exercise held in the Mediterranean Sea where the Sixth Marines became the first unit of the United States Marine Corps to participate in a helicopter-borne vertical envelopment operation during an overseas deployment.

When trouble broke out in Lebanon in July 1958, the Third Battalion, and Sixth Marines landed within fifteen hours after receipt of orders. Early in the Cuban Missile Crisis, the 2nd Battalion landed at Guantanamo Bay to supplement the defense of the naval base. In 1965, the regiment landed to protect American lives and property in the Dominican Republic during Operation Powerpack.

In 1983, 2nd Battalion, 6th Marines participated in the Multinational Peacekeeping Force in Beirut, Lebanon. December 1989 saw elements of the Sixth Marines in Panama for Operation Just Cause. From September 1990 to April 1991 the regiment deployed to Southwest Asia to participate in Operation Desert Shield and Operation Desert Storm. The 6th Marines conducted the northernmost breach of the infamous Saddam Line on 24 February 1991 then advanced to a key objective known as the Ice Tray. There, the regiment repulsed an Iraqi mechanized force during an early morning action dubbed the "Reveille Counterattack." The cease fire found the 6th Marines securely lodged at the base of Mutla Ridge blocking a major exit from Kuwait City. The regiment received a Meritorious Unit Citation for its actions during the liberation of Kuwait.

=== Global war on terrorism ===
Marines from the 3rd Battalion, 6th Marine Regiment in Afghanistan during 2010

In the first part of 2004, Headquarters Company, 6th Marines, deployed to Bagram Airfield, Afghanistan in support of Operation Enduring Freedom under the operational title Regimental Combat Team 6. During the first part of 2004, Battalion Landing Team 1/6 deployed to Kandahar Air Base, Afghanistan in support of Operation Enduring Freedom.

In January 2007, Headquarters Company, 6th Marines, deployed in support of Operation Iraqi Freedom, under the operational title Regimental Combat Team 6. The regiment took operational control of three infantry battalions: 3rd Battalion, 2nd Marines, 2nd Battalion, 8th Marines and 1st Battalion, 24th Marines.

Additional subordinate commands include: 1st Reconnaissance Battalion, Company C, 2nd Tank Battalion, Company B, 2nd Tank Battalion, Company B, 2nd Assault Amphibian Battalion, Company C, 2nd Combat Engineer Battalion and Battery I, 3rd Battalion, 12th Marines.

In Spring 2007, these units were replaced by 2nd Battalion, 6th Marines, 2nd Battalion, 7th Marines, 3rd Battalion, 6th Marines, and Company B, 2nd Tank Battalion.

In October 2007, 1st Reconnaissance Battalion was replaced by 2nd Reconnaissance Battalion.

They served in Ramadi, Iraq from January 2009 – September 2009, when they were replaced by the 1st Brigade of the 82nd Airborne Division, Advise and Assist Brigade (AAB).

6th Marines deployed in December 2011 to Afghanistan as Regimental Combat Team 6. RCT-6 arrived in Afghanistan on 24 December 2011 at Camp Bastion. RCT-6 Headquarters was located at FOB Delaram, AFG with Marines from the unit at Combat Out Post (COP) and Patrol Bases (PB) to support subordinate commands.

In January 2017, the Marine Corps Times reported that in spring 2017, the U.S. Marine Corps will deploy a task force of 300 personnel (known as Task Force Southwest) for nine months to southwestern Afghanistan to advise-and-assist local security forces in countering Taliban gains in the Helmand province. Officials said the Marines will work alongside "key leaders" from the Afghan National Army's 215th Corps and the 505th Zone National Police "to further optimize their capabilities in that region." Task Force Southwest will comprise mostly more-senior military personnel selected from units across II Marine Expeditionary Force, including the 6th Marine Regiment; With the Support of the Marines and Sailors of Charlie Co. 1/2 the Task Force will be replacing the US Army's Task Force Forge, which has conducted a similar advisory role for much of 2016.

External image
- Some marines were cutting a cake to celebrate the 100th anniversary

On 30 August 2017, a few members of the regiment cut a cake to celebrate the 100th anniversary of the unit with a bayonet mounted Springfield M1903.

In Spring 2019 the 6th Marine Regiment headquarters redeployed to Afghanistan once again in support of Task Force Southwest.

In the 2011 video game L.A Noire, the protagonist Cole Phelps and several other characters served in the 6th Marines during World War 2.

== Notable former members ==
- Chester R. Allen, Major General, USMC. Served with 6th Marines in China during 1930s.
- Leslie E. Brown, Lieutenant General, USMC. Served with regimental Weapons Company during World War II.
- Clifton B. Cates, General, USMC. Served with 96th Company, 2nd Battalion during World War I.
- Oscar R. Cauldwell, Major General, USMC. Served with 95th Company, 1st Battalion during World War I.
- Joseph F. Dunford Jr., General, USMC. Commanded 2nd Battalion from 1996 until 1998.
- Graves B. Erskine, General, USMC. Served with 79th Company, 2nd Battalion during World War I.
- John Groff, Brigadier general, USMC. Served with 83rd Company, 3rd Battalion during World War I.
- Vernon M. Guymon, Brigadier general, USMC. Served with 79th Company, 2nd Battalion during World War I.
- Leo D. Hermle, Lieutenant General, USMC. Commanding Officer in 1941. Also served with 74th Company, 1st Battalion during World War I.
- Ray Hanson, Colonel, USMCR. Served with 75th Company, 1st Battalion during World War I.
- Thomas Holcomb, General, USMC. Commanded 2nd Battalion during World War I.
- Arnold W. Jacobsen, Major General, USMC. Served with 84th Company, 3rd Battalion during World War I.
- Louis R. Jones, Major General, USMC. Served with 75th Company, 1st Battalion during World War I.
- Russell N. Jordahl, Brigadier general, USMC. Commanding officer in 1950.
- Homer Litzenberg, Lieutenant General, USMC, Commanding officer in 1949.
- Ira J. McDonald, Los Angeles City Council member.
- Charles I. Murray, Brigadier General, USMC. Served with 79th Company, 2nd Battalion during World War I.
- Alfred H. Noble, General, USMC. Served with 83rd Company, 3rd Battalion during World War I.
- John H. Pruitt, Corporal, USMC. Served with 6th Marines during. Two time CMOH recipient World War I
- William E. Riley, Lieutenant General, USMC. Served with 74th Company, 1st Battalion during World War I.
- William W. Rogers, Major General, USMC. Served with 82nd Company, 3rd Battalion during World War I.
- George K. Shuler, Major, USMC. Commanded 3rd Battalion during World War I. Later served as New York State Treasurer.
- Gerald C. Thomas, General, USMC. Served with 75th Company, 1st Battalion during World War I.
- Philip H. Torrey, Major General, USMC. Commanded 6th Marine Regiment in 1936–1937.
- Leon Uris, author.
- Gregon A. Williams, Major General, USMC. Commanded 6th Marine Regiment during the Battle of Okinawa.
- William J. Whaling, Major General, USMC. Served with 6th Marines during World War I.
- William A. Worton, Major General, USMC. Served with 79th Company, 2nd Battalion during World War I.

== Honors and awards ==
The 6th Marine Regiment has been awarded the following:

- Presidential Unit Citation Streamer
  - World War II Tarawa – 1943
- Navy Unit Commendation Streamer
  - Southwest Asia 1990–1991
- World War I Victory Streamer with five Bronze Stars
- Army of Occupation of Germany streamer
- Yangtze Service Streamer
- Marine Corps Expeditionary Streamer with three Bronze Stars
- China Service Streamer
- American Defense Service Streamer with one Bronze Star
- European – African – Middle Eastern Campaign Streamer
- Asiatic – Pacific Campaign Streamer with one Silver And One Bronze Star
- World War II Victory Streamer
- Navy Occupation Service Streamer With "Asia" And "Europe"
- National Defense Service Streamer with two Bronze Stars
- Armed Forces Expeditionary Streamer With Two Bronze stars
- South West Asia Service Streamer with two Bronze Stars
- French Croix de guerre With Two Palms And One Gilt star, allowing the members to wear a Croix de guerre Fourragère.

== See also ==
- List of United States Marine Corps regiments
- Organization of the United States Marine Corps
