= Gilder D. Jackson Jr. =

United States Marine Corps general

Gilder Davis Jackson Jr.
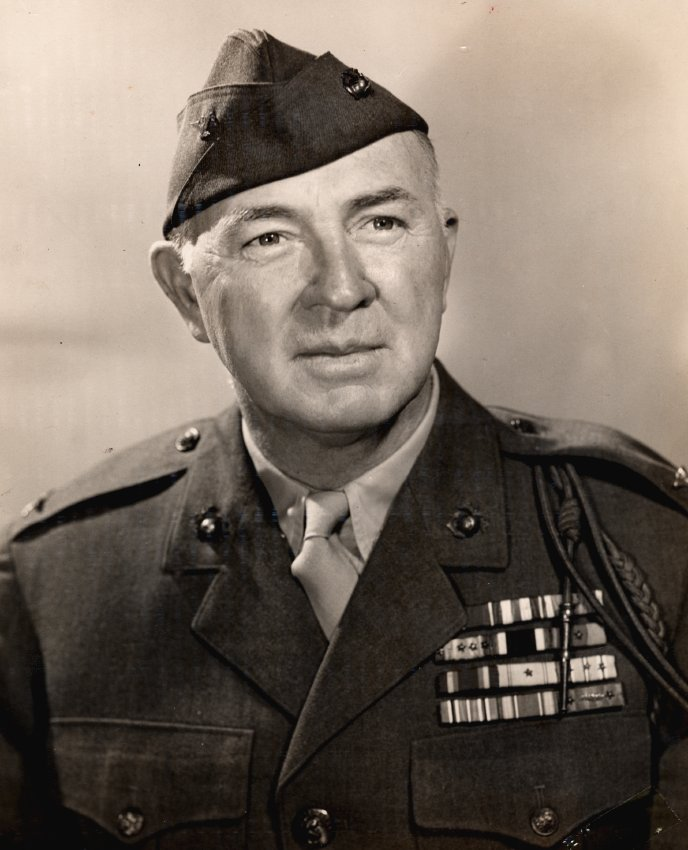
- Gilder D. Jackson as colonel, USMC
- Born: July 5, 1893; Dover, Delaware, US
- Died: February 19, 1966 (aged 72); Coronado, California, US
- Burial place: Fort Rosecrans National Cemetery
- Military career
- Allegiance: United States
- Branch: United States Marine Corps
- Service years: 1917–1946
- Rank: Brigadier general
- Service number: 0-469
- Commands: MCB San Diego; 6th Marine Regiment; The Basic School
- Conflicts: World War I: Battle of Belleau Wood; Battle of Soissons; Battle of Saint-Mihiel; Battle of Blanc Mont Ridge; Meuse-Argonne Offensive; Yangtze Patrol; Haitian Campaign; World War II: Attack on Pearl Harbor; Battle of Guadalcanal; Solomon Islands campaign
- Awards: Navy Cross; Legion of Merit; Silver Star; Purple Heart (2)

Gilder Davis Jackson Jr. (July 5, 1893 – February 19, 1966) was a highly decorated officer of the United States Marine Corps with the rank of brigadier general, who is most noted for his service as commanding officer of the 6th Marine Regiment during the Guadalcanal Campaign.

== Early career ==
Gilder D. Jackson Jr. was born on July 5, 1893, in Dover, Delaware. He attended Wenonah Military Academy in Wenonah, New Jersey, and graduated in 1912. Jackson later joined the Marine Corps on April 17, 1917, and was commissioned second lieutenant on the same date. He attended the basic training at Marine Barracks Parris Island, South Carolina and was assigned to the 18th Company, 2nd Battalion, 5th Marine Regiment stationed at Marine Barracks Quantico, Virginia. Jackson was appointed platoon leader within his company and sailed for France in June 1917.

He commanded his platoon as first lieutenant during the Battle of Belleau Wood in June 1918 and was wounded in the cheek while leading the attack on an enemy machine gun post. Despite his wound, Jackson continued the attack and successfully reached the objective. For his gallantry in action, he was decorated with the Silver Star citation. Jackson recovered quickly, was promoted to the rank of captain and assigned to 43rd Company, 2nd Battalion. He participated with distinction in the Battle of Soissons at the end of July 1918, when he took out an enemy artillery position near the town of Vierzy and captured many prisoners, including two officers. Jackson was subsequently decorated with the Navy Cross for his actions and also received French Croix de guerre 1914–1918 with Palm by the Government of France.

Captain Jackson subsequently participated in the Battle of Saint-Mihiel and was wounded again, but he was back for the upcoming Battle of Blanc Mont Ridge in October 1918. He participated in this battle as commander of 20th Company, 3rd Battalion 5th Marines and commanded that unit also during Meuse-Argonne Offensive in November 1918.

=== Navy Cross Citation ===
Action Date: 18 July 1918
Name: Gilder D. Jackson Jr.
Service: United States Marine Corps
Rank: Captain
Company: 43rd Company
Regiment: 5th Marines
Division: 2d Division, American Expeditionary Forces
Citation: The President of the United States of America takes pleasure in presenting the Navy Cross to Major [then Captain] Gilder D. Jackson, Jr. (MCSN: 0-469), United States Marine Corps, for extraordinary heroism while serving with the 43d Company, 5th Regiment (Marines), 2d Division, A.E.F., near Vierzy, France, in action early on the morning of 18 July 1918. As Second in Command of the 43d (F) Company, Fifth Marines, while on a mission to establish liaison with a neighboring unit, Major Jackson discovered an enemy battery firing on our supporting tanks from a position concealed in a wheat field. With a splendid display of initiative and leadership, he gathered together a few men whom he organized and most skillfully and gallantly led against this position, capturing many prisoners, including two officers, four pieces of artillery, two mobile trench mortars and undoubtedly saved to the battalion by his timely act the five undamaged tanks that played such an important role in the later action.

== Interwar period ==
Jackson remained in the Marine Corps after the War and served with occupation forces in Germany as Second in command of 2nd Battalion, 5th Marine Regiment. He returned to the United States in July 1919 as was assigned to the Marine Corps recruiting office in St. Louis, Missouri, where he remained until 1923. Jackson was subsequently transferred to the Marine detachment aboard the battleship USS Tennessee and participated in shore duties in China and Haiti as a member of First Brigade of Marines.

Later he attended the Advanced course at Infantry School at Fort Benning, Georgia. Jackson was transferred to 5th Marine Regiment at Marine Barracks Quantico, Virginia, in 1935. He was promoted to the rank of lieutenant colonel in June 1936 and given command of 2nd Battalion, 5th Marine Regiment, where he relieved Lt. Col. LeRoy P. Hunt. Jackson served in this capacity until June 1937, when he was relieved by Lemuel C. Shepherd Jr. and appointed commander of the Marine Corps Basic School at Quantico.

== World War II ==
At the time of Japanese Attack on Pearl Harbor, Jackson was officially stationed at Hawaii as commanding officer of local Marine Barracks, but he was sent aboard the heavy cruiser USS Indianapolis to Johnston Atoll to observe the testing of new Higgins boat. He was transferred to Camp Elliott, California, at the beginning of August 1942 and relieved Colonel Leo D. Hermle as commanding officer of 6th Marine Regiment. His regiment subsequently sailed within 2nd Marine Division under Major General John Marston to South Pacific aboard the liner Matsonia during October 1942 and subsequently arrived to Wellington, New Zealand.

His regiment subsequently participated in the training for combat deployment, which occurred at the beginning of January 1943, when they arrived on Guadalcanal. Jackson and his regiment were ordered to replace heavily depleted 2nd Marine Regiment which was in the combat area since August 1942. The Sixth Marines subsequently took part in the final attack inland and took part in the Battle of Gifu.

Together with 8th Marines under Richard H. Jeschke, Jackson and his troops encircled 4th and 16th Regiments from 2nd IJA Division under General Masao Maruyama and subsequently killed 642 Japanese troops with only capturing two. Then they reached the Cape Esperance, where Japanese units were withdrawing from Guadalcanal. After the island was declared secured at the beginning of February 1943, 6th Marines were ordered to the camp in the beach area, for hot showers and some rest. Unfortunately a lot of men from 6th Marines have infected with malaria during the fighting on Guadalcanal and Colonel Jackson was no exception.

After the 6th Marines were ordered back to New Zealand on February 19, 1943, and Jackson was placed in hospital. He was found unfit for combat duty and relieved by his executive officer, Lt. Colonel Lyman G. Miller on April 13, 1943. At least a small satisfaction for him was a decoration with Legion of Merit with Combat "V".

He was subsequently ordered back to the United States together with Brigadier General Alphonse DeCarre, who had the same troubles with malaria and spent almost month in the Naval Hospital, San Diego, before he was appointed Area Inspector of the Fleet Marine Force in the San Diego area under the command of Lieutenant General Holland M. Smith in July 1943. Jackson served in this capacity until April 1944, when he was transferred to the Marine barracks at Puget Sound Naval Shipyard, Washington. He completed his career as commanding officer of the Marine Corps Base San Diego from January 3 to July 28, 1946. Jackson was relieved by Brigadier General Leo D. Hermle and subsequently retired from the Marine Corps on December 1, 1946. He was also advanced to the rank of brigadier general on the retired list for having been specially commended in combat.

Jackson died on February 19, 1966, in Coronado, California, and is buried at Fort Rosecrans National Cemetery together with his wife Vesta Elliot Jackson. They had together one son, Gilder D. Jackson III.

== Decorations ==
Here is the ribbon bar of Brigadier General Gilder D. Jackson Jr.:

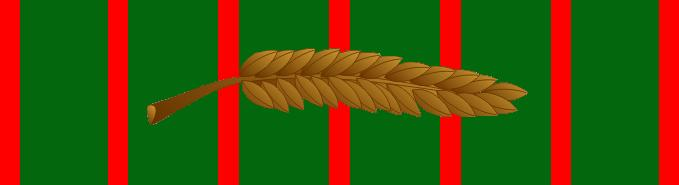

1st Row	Navy Cross			
2nd Row	Silver Star	Legion of Merit with Combat "V"	Purple Heart with Oak Leaf Cluster	Marine Corps Expeditionary Medal with one star
3rd Row	World War I Victory Medal with five Battle clasps	Army of Occupation of Germany Medal	Yangtze Service Medal	American Defense Service Medal with Base Clasp
4th Row	Asiatic-Pacific Campaign Medal with three service stars	American Campaign Medal	World War II Victory Medal	French Croix de guerre 1914–1918 with Palm and Stars

Military offices
Preceded by Harry B. Liversedge	Commanding Officer of Marine Corps Recruit Depot San Diego; June 3, 1946 – July 28, 1946	Succeeded by Leo D. Hermle
Preceded by Leo D. Hermle	Commanding Officer of the 6th Marine Regiment; August 1, 1942 – April 13, 1943	Succeeded by Lyman G. Miller
