= Ray Hanson =

- Hanson pictured in Sequel 1931, Western Illinois yearbook

Biographical details
- Born: October 5, 1895; Vasa, Minnesota, U.S.
- Died: January 4, 1982 (aged 86); Macomb, Illinois, U.S.

Coaching career (HC unless noted)

Football
- 1925: Crosby HS (CT)
- 1926–1941: Western Illinois

Basketball
- 1929–1941: Western Illinois
- 1946–1947: Western Illinois

Baseball
- c. 1930: Western Illinois

Administrative career (AD unless noted)
- 1925–1926: Crosby HS (CT)
- 1926–1943: Western Illinois
- 1945–1964: Western Illinois

Head coaching record
- Overall: 51–63–13 (college football)

Raymond Willis "Rock" Hanson (October 5, 1895 – January 4, 1982) was an American military officer and college sports coach and administrator. He was a United States Marine Corps colonel and highly decorated veteran of World War I and World War II. Hanson served as the head football coach at Western Illinois State Teachers College—now known as Western Illinois University—in Macomb, Illinois, from 1926 to 1941.

== Marine Corps career ==
Hanson enlisted in the Marine Corps in 1916 and served during World War I. He was assigned to the 75th Company, 1st Battalion, 6th Marine Regiment. Hanson participated in the Battle of Belleau Wood, Battle of Château-Thierry and many other battles.

During the Battle of Château-Thierry, Corporal Hanson saved his comrade, Private William A. Weaver, who was seriously wounded in the leg and pinned down by enemy machine gun fire. Hanson went out in front of US lines and, after reaching the wounded Pvt. Weaver, he stopped the bleeding and carried him to safety. For the extraordinary heroism in combat, Hanson was decorated with the Navy Cross. He was also decorated with the Silver Star, Purple Heart and French Croix de guerre 1914–1918 with Palm by the Government of France.

After the war, Hanson remained in the Marine Corps and served during the Allied occupation of the Rhineland. He subsequently resigned from the Marine Corps, but stayed in the Marine Corps Reserve.

During World War II, Hanson was recalled to the active service and was assigned to the Camp Elliott, San Diego as Chief Morale Officer. He later served as Fleet Marine Force recreation officer and was responsible for planning of tours of Pacific bases by his troupe of 30 Marine entertainers. He retired with the rank of colonel.

== Coaching career ==
Hanson officially began his coaching career at Western after studying under Knute Rockne (hence the nickname "Rock"). Hanson had the distinction of being the football coach the first year that a black athlete, Ernest Page, played on Western's team, as well as having the longest tenure of any head football coach ever at Western.

Hanson was the head football coach for at Western Illinois State Teachers College—now known as Western Illinois University—in Macomb, Illinois, serving for 16 seasons, from 1926 to 1941, and compiling a record of 56–59–12.

Hanson gained permission from the Marine Corps to use the name "Fighting Leathernecks" for Western's teams. To this day, Western Illinois University is the only public school in the United States that has permission through the Department of the Navy to use the United States Marine Corps official seal and mascot, the bulldog, along with the nickname. Western's mascot, a bulldog named Colonel Rock, or more commonly "Rocky", was named in honor of Hanson, as was Western's football field, Hanson Field.

== Death ==
Hanson died on January 4, 1982, at McDonough Hospital in Macomb.

== Head coaching record ==
=== College football ===
Year	Team	Overall	Conference	Standing	Bowl/playoffs
Western Illinois Leathernecks (Illinois Intercollegiate Athletic Conference) (1926–1941)
1926	Western Illinois	4–3–1	4–3	9th	
1927	Western Illinois	6–3–1	5–3–1	11th	
1928	Western Illinois	2–3–3	2–3–2	T–13th	
1929	Western Illinois	0–8 (Note: Western Illinois finished the 1929 season 3–5 overall and 3–4 in conference play, but forfeited three conference wins after the season because of ineligible player.)	0–7	23rd	
1930	Western Illinois	4–4	3–4	15th	
1931	Western Illinois	2–6	2–4	T–16th	
1932	Western Illinois	4–2–1	4–2–1	T–6th	
1933	Western Illinois	3–5	2–4	T–15th	
1934	Western Illinois	5–3	4–2	7th	
1935	Western Illinois	2–6	1–6	17th	
1936	Western Illinois	3–2–2	3–2–1	T–7th	
1937	Western Illinois	3–4–1	3–1–1	7th	
1938	Western Illinois	4–3–1	2–2	4th	
1939	Western Illinois	5–1–1	3–0–1	1st	
1940	Western Illinois	1–6–1	0–3–1	T–6th	
1941	Western Illinois	3–4–1	1–2–1	4th	
Western Illinois:		51–63–13	39–48–9		
Total:		51–63–13			
National championship Conference title Conference division title or championship game berth
