= Dudley S. Brown =

U.S. Marine Corps general (1896–1971)

Dudley Southworth Brown
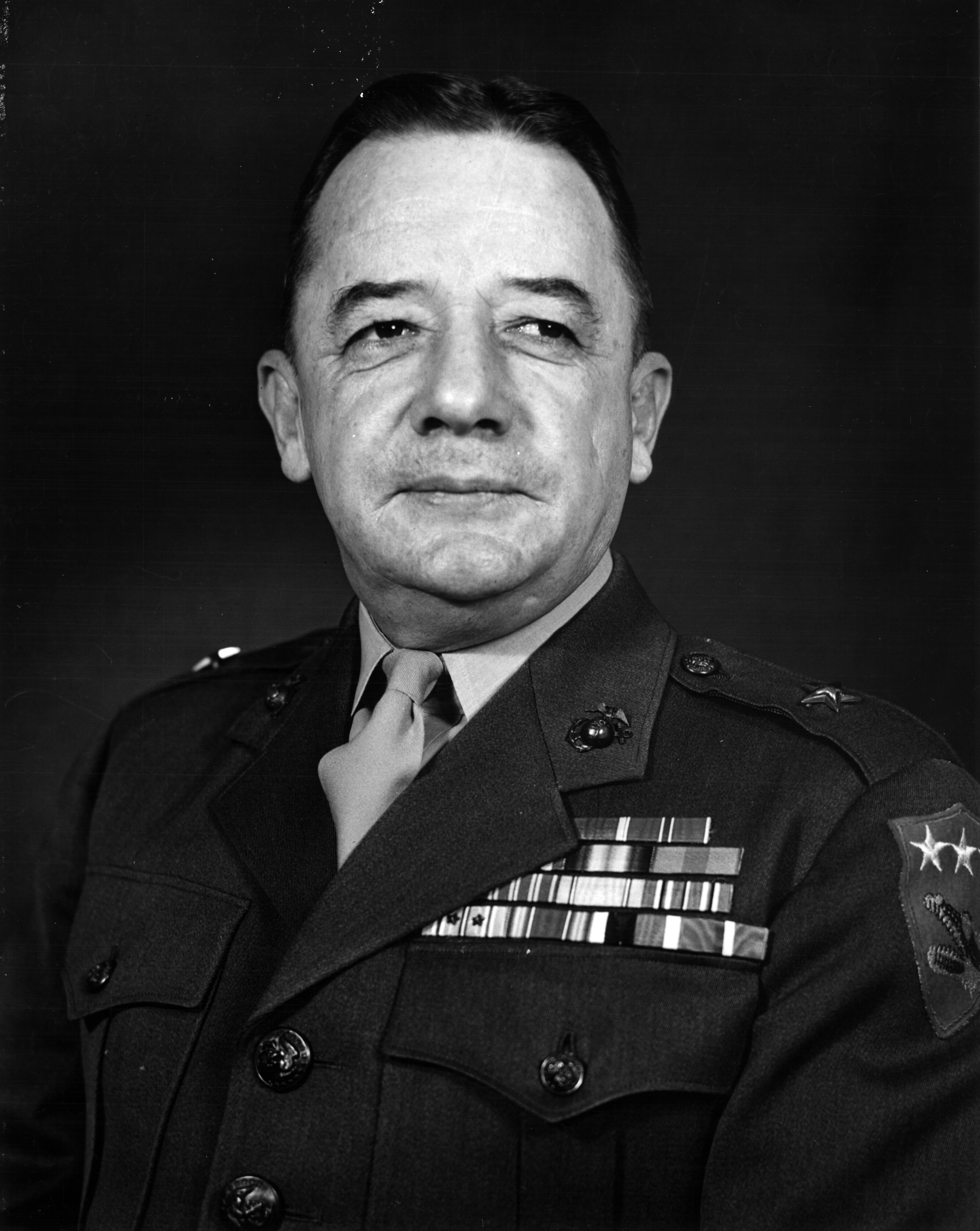
- Brown as brigadier general, USMC
- Born: March 30, 1896; Fort Whipple, Arizona, US
- Died: March 10, 1971 (aged 74); Portsmouth, Virginia, US
- Burial place: Arlington National Cemetery
- Military career
- Allegiance: United States of America
- Branch: United States Marine Corps
- Service years: 1917–1950
- Rank: Major general
- Service number: 0-471
- Commands: CoS of V Amphibious Corps; ADC of 2nd Marine Division
- Conflicts: World War I; Dominican Campaign; Nicaraguan Campaign; World War II; Battle of Palau Islands; Philippines Campaign; Battle of Iwo Jima
- Awards: Legion of Merit; Bronze Star Medal; Navy Commendation Medal

Dudley Southworth Brown (March 30, 1896 – March 10, 1971) was an officer of the United States Marine Corps with the rank of major general, who served on the High staff positions during World War II.

== Early years ==
Brown was born on March 30, 1896, in Fort Whipple, Arizona. After graduating from University of Arizona in 1917, he enlisted in the Marine Corps on 18 June 1917 and was commissioned second lieutenant on the same date. His first assignment was with the newly activated 11th Marine Regiment, which was sent to France in October 1918 in the closing months of World War One. Brown did not see combat, and returned to the United States with the rest of the regiment in July 1919.

After his return, Brown served for almost two years at Marine Barracks in Boston, Massachusetts. He was then assigned to the 15th Marine Regiment within 2nd Brigade of Marines, on deployment to the Dominican Republic. Brown was promoted to company commander within his regiment and stayed in Santo Domingo until November 1923. During this time, he also served as Aide-de-camp to the brigade commander, General Harry Lee.

== World War II ==
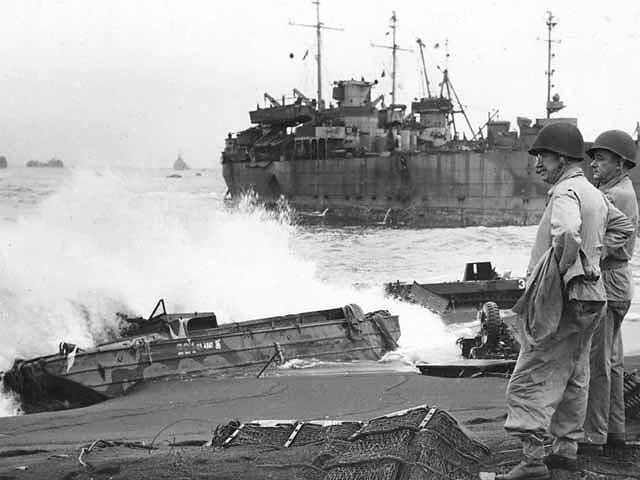
Lt.General Holland M. Smith and Colonel Dudley S. Brown inspecting the wreckages of landing vehicles, following the Battle of Iwo Jima, February 1945.

In November 1941, prior to the Japanese Attack on Pearl Harbor, Brown was appointed operations officer within Amphibious Force, Pacific Fleet under Major General Clayton Barney Vogel. His command was redesignated I Marine Amphibious Corps in October 1942 and sailed immediately for South Pacific. He did not see direct combat and was stationed at Nouméa, New Caledonia. However, South Pacific Area Commander, Admiral William F. Halsey was not satisfied with general Vogel and asked Commandant General Thomas Holcomb for replacement. Brown followed his superior in July 1943, when he was relieved by Lieutenant Colonel Edward W. Snedeker and was transferred back to the United States. For his distinguished service during the operation, Brown was decorated with Navy Commendation Medal.

He was subsequently appointed chief of staff of Fleet Marine Force under general Holland M. Smith in San Diego, California. Brown was transferred back to the Pacific in February 1944, when he was assigned back to the staff of I Marine Amphibious Corps under Major General Roy Geiger. He was appointed corps chief of planning section and assistant chief of staff. After brief period of duty, he was appointed chief of staff of Expeditionary Troops, Third Fleet. Brown served in this capacity under Major General Julian C. Smith and participated in Palau Islands campaign. For his service in this capacity, Brown was decorated with the Legion of Merit with Combat "V".

Brown was appointed assistant chief of staff of planning section of Fleet Marine Force, Pacific under Lieutenant General Holland M. Smith in October 1944. He participated in the planning of the Iwo Jima operation and during the battle served simultaneously as chief of staff of Expeditionary Troops, Fifth Fleet again under General Smith. For his distinguished service during the operation, Brown was decorated with Navy Commendation Medal.

== Postwar career ==
During August 1945, Brown was appointed deputy chief of staff of Sixth Army under General Walter Krueger. As an experienced staff officer, he participated in the planning of Operation Downfall, planned invasion to Japan. However, the Empire of Japan surrendered on September 2, 1945, and the operation was cancelled. Brown was decorated with the Bronze Star Medal for his participation in the planning. While he served in this capacity, he also participated in the Occupation of Japan.

In December 1945, Brown was ordered back to the United States and promoted to the rank of brigadier general. He was subsequently appointed Chief of staff of V Amphibious Corps and succeeded Brigadier General William W. Rogers in this capacity. The V Amphibious Corps was officially deactivated in February 1946 and transferred to Washington, D.C., where he was assigned to the staff of the National War College. In January 1947, Brown was transferred to Camp Lejeune, North Carolina, and appointed assistant division commander of 2nd Marine Division under Major General Thomas E. Watson.

His last service assignment came at the beginning of May 1948, when he was appointed deputy commandant of the Marine Corps Schools at Marine Corps Base Quantico, Virginia. Brown retired from the Marine Corps on July 1, 1950, and was advanced to the rank of major general on the retired list for having been specially commended in combat. Upon his retirement from the military, Brown resided in White Stone, Virginia, and died of cancer on March 10, 1971, in Portsmouth Naval Hospital. He is buried at Arlington National Cemetery, Virginia, together with his wife Josephine H. Brown (1896–1981).

== Decorations ==
Here is the ribbon bar of Major General Dudley S. Brown:

1st Row	Legion of Merit with Combat "V"			
2nd Row	Bronze Star Medal	Navy Commendation Medal	Marine Corps Expeditionary Medal	World War I Victory Medal with one battle clasps
3rd Row	Second Nicaraguan Campaign Medal	American Defense Service Medal with Base Clasp	American Campaign Medal	Asiatic–Pacific Campaign Medal with two 3/16 inch service stars
4th Row	World War II Victory Medal	Navy Occupation Service Medal	National Defense Service Medal	Philippine Liberation Medal
