= Clayton Barney Vogel =

United States Marine Corps general (1882–1964)

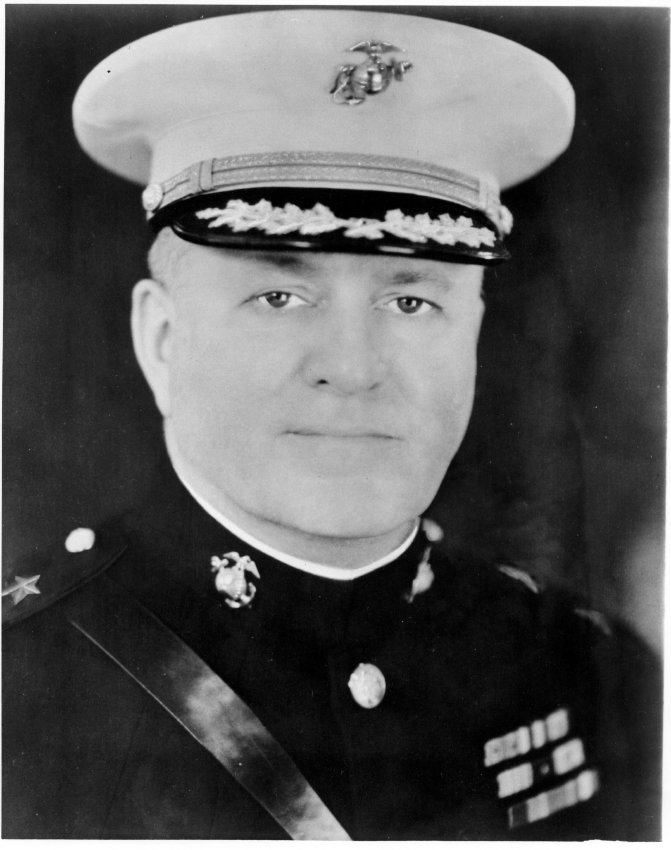
- Vogel in 1942
- Born: September 18, 1882; Philadelphia, Pennsylvania, US
- Died: November 26, 1964 (aged 82); Philadelphia, Pennsylvania, US
- Burial place: Arlington National Cemetery
- Relatives: Major General Rathvon M. Tompkins (son-in-law)
- Military career
- Allegiance: United States
- Branch: United States Marine Corps
- Service years: 1904–1946
- Rank: Major General
- Nickname: "Barney"
- Commands: Marine Corps Recruit Depot Parris Island; Fleet Marine Force, San Diego Area; I Marine Amphibious Corps; 2nd Marine Division; Garde d'Haiti
- Conflicts: Yangtze Patrol; Veracruz Expedition; Banana Wars; Haitian Campaign; Nicaraguan Campaign; World War II

Clayton Barney Vogel (September 18, 1882 – November 26, 1964) was a United States Marine Corps officer with the rank of major general who served in a variety of capacities from 1902 until 1946. He is best known for his support of the Navajo code talker program.

== Early life ==
Clayton Vogel was born on September 18, 1882, in Philadelphia, the son of Theodore Knight and Clayonia Woods Vogel. Clayton was influenced by his father, who was a veteran of the Civil War and served with the Union Army's 198th Pennsylvania Volunteer Infantry as a brevetted Captain. His father was also a founding member of the Military Order of the Loyal Legion of the United States.

Following high school, Vogel attended Rutgers University and graduated in the summer of 1904 with a bachelor's degree. He entered Marine Corps service and was commissioned a second lieutenant on August 4, 1904. He was subsequently ordered to the School of Application at Annapolis, Maryland for basic officer training, which he completed in early November, 1905. He was then attached to the Marine barracks at Naval Air Station Pensacola, Florida and served in this capacity until June 1906. He was then ordered to Marine Barracks, Washington, D.C. for service with a detachment of Marines being organized for duty at the American Legation in Peking, China.

Vogel sailed for China in July 1906, arriving at Cavite, Philippine Islands in August, and then Peking one month later. In February 1908, while stationed in China, he was promoted to first lieutenant.

Vogel returned to the United States in February 1909 and was posted to the Marine Officers' School at Port Royal, South Carolina, as adjutant to Eli K. Cole. He completed this duty in December of that year and was assigned to the 2nd Marine Regiment under Lieutenant Colonel Joseph H. Pendleton, attached to the 1st Marine Expeditionary Brigade. Vogel subsequently sailed for the Panama Canal Zone, where the Marines assisted in maintaining order in Panama during the republic's elections.

Following his return to the United States in March 1910, Vogel again served at the Port Royal Officers' School, until being reassigned to the 2nd Marine Regiment in January 1911 and ordered to Guantanamo Bay, Cuba, in order to protect American interests during internal disorder on the island. Vogel returned to the United States in June 1911, and following the disbandment of the regiment he assumed prestigious duty as a special aide at the White House during the tenure of President William Howard Taft.

In May 1912, revolt again flared in Cuba, and Vogel was re-posted to the 2nd Marine Regiment. The regiment then sailed as a part of the 1st Provisional Marine Brigade to Nipe Bay on the northern coast of Cuba and helped quell the revolt. Vogel came back to the United States in August 1912 and joined the Marine detachment aboard the battleship USS Nebraska one month later. While aboard the ship, Vogel participated in the American occupation of Veracruz during the Mexican Revolution in May–June 1914.

Vogel was promoted to the rank of captain in February 1915 and returned to the United States in December for assignment to the Marine barracks at the Philadelphia Navy Yard. This peaceful duty was interrupted when he was ordered to troubled Haiti in April 1916. Vogel reported to Port-au-Prince as an Inspector-Instructor of Haitian Constabulary – Garde d'Haïti, and helped train them to combat hostile Cacos bandits. He served in this capacity for most of the First World War and was promoted to the temporary rank of major in May 1917.

== Interwar period ==
In December 1918, following the end of the Great War, Vogel returned to the United States. He reverted to his permanent rank of captain and was assigned to Marine Barracks Quantico, Virginia. From June to September 1919 he participated in the National Rifle Matches at Caldwell, New Jersey; he was then appointed commanding officer of the Marine detachment aboard the transport ship USS Pocahontas and took part in the repatriation of German prisoners of war.

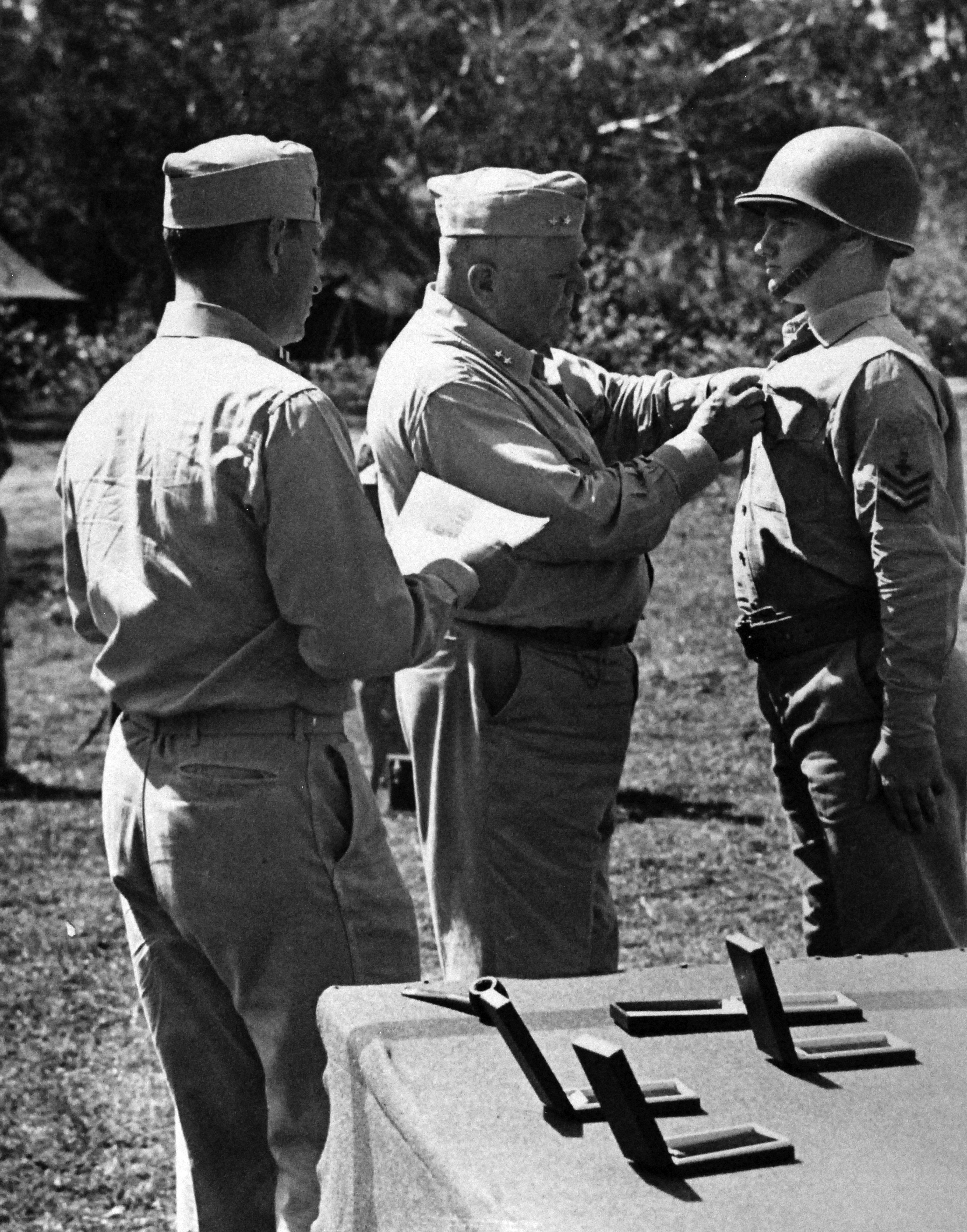
General Vogel decorates Navy Corpsman Delbert E. Eilers with Silver Star for his bravery during the Solomon Islands Campaign, New Caledonia, summer 1943.

The Pocahontas was decommissioned in November 1919, and Vogel was promoted to the permanent rank of major and ordered to his native Philadelphia as officer in charge of local recruiting district. He was transferred to Marine Barracks, Washington, D.C., in December 1920 and commanded the barracks until summer 1923. Vogel also commanded his marines during the rescue works at the Knickerbocker Theatre Disaster in January 1922.

He left Washington, D.C., in July 1923 and joined the staff of Scouting Force under Rear Admiral Newton A. McCully as Fleet Marine Officer. Vogel was ordered to Camp Perry, Ohio, in August 1925 and was in command of the Scoring Detachment at the National Rifle Matches. He was subsequently ordered to the Field Officers' Course at the Marine Corps Schools, Quantico and graduated in May 1926. His next assignment took him back to Washington, D.C. where he was attached to the Office of Judge Advocate General of the Navy under Rear Admiral Edward Hale Campbell. While on duty in Washington, Vogel graduated from the postgraduate course in law at Georgetown University and was also promoted to the rank of lieutenant colonel in July 1928.

Vogel was ordered to Nicaragua in May 1929 and assumed duty as chief of staff to the commandant of the Nicaraguan National Guard under Anastasio Somoza García. He served in that country during the combats with rebel forces under Augusto César Sandino and received Nicaraguan Presidential Medal of Merit with Diploma for service in that capacity.

Lieutenant Colonel Vogel was ordered to the United States in June 1930 and was appointed commanding officer of Marine barracks at Naval Operating Base, Hampton Roads, Virginia. He remained there until November of that year and subsequently sailed for his second tour of duty in Haiti. Vogel arrived at Port-au-Prince and assumed duty as chief of staff to the commandant of the Garde d'Haïti, Colonel Richard P. Williams.

He succeeded Williams as commandant of the Garde d'Haiti in June 1933 and was made acting major general in the Haitian Constabulary. Vogel held this office until the withdrawal of U.S. forces from Haiti in August 1934 and was awarded a special letter of commendation by the Secretary of the Navy, Claude A. Swanson. While in this capacity, Vogel was also decorated by the Government of Haiti and received Haitian National Order of Honour and Merit, rank Commander, Haitian Distinguished Service Medal, Haitian Military Medal and Haitian Brevet of Merit with Diploma.

Upon his return to the United States, Vogel was attached as newly promoted colonel to the Headquarters Marine Corps in Washington, D.C., and assumed duty in the Adjutant and Inspector's Department under Brigadier General David D. Porter. He was promoted to the temporary rank of brigadier general in March 1937 and succeeded retiring general Porter as Adjutant and Inspector General of the Marine Corps. While in this capacity, Vogel toured many bases across the Pacific and Caribbean and during his inspection at Marine Barracks at Coco Solo, Panama, in March 1939, he received word from Commandant Thomas Holcomb about receiving of command of the 2nd Marine Brigade.

Holcomb planned to bring the brigade up to the fine standard of landing operation expertise now found in the 1st Marine Brigade and thought Vogel would fit the job. Vogel was appointed to the permanent rank of brigadier general in February 1939 and succeeded John C. Beaumont in command of 2nd Marine Brigade in San Diego during September of that year.

== World War II ==
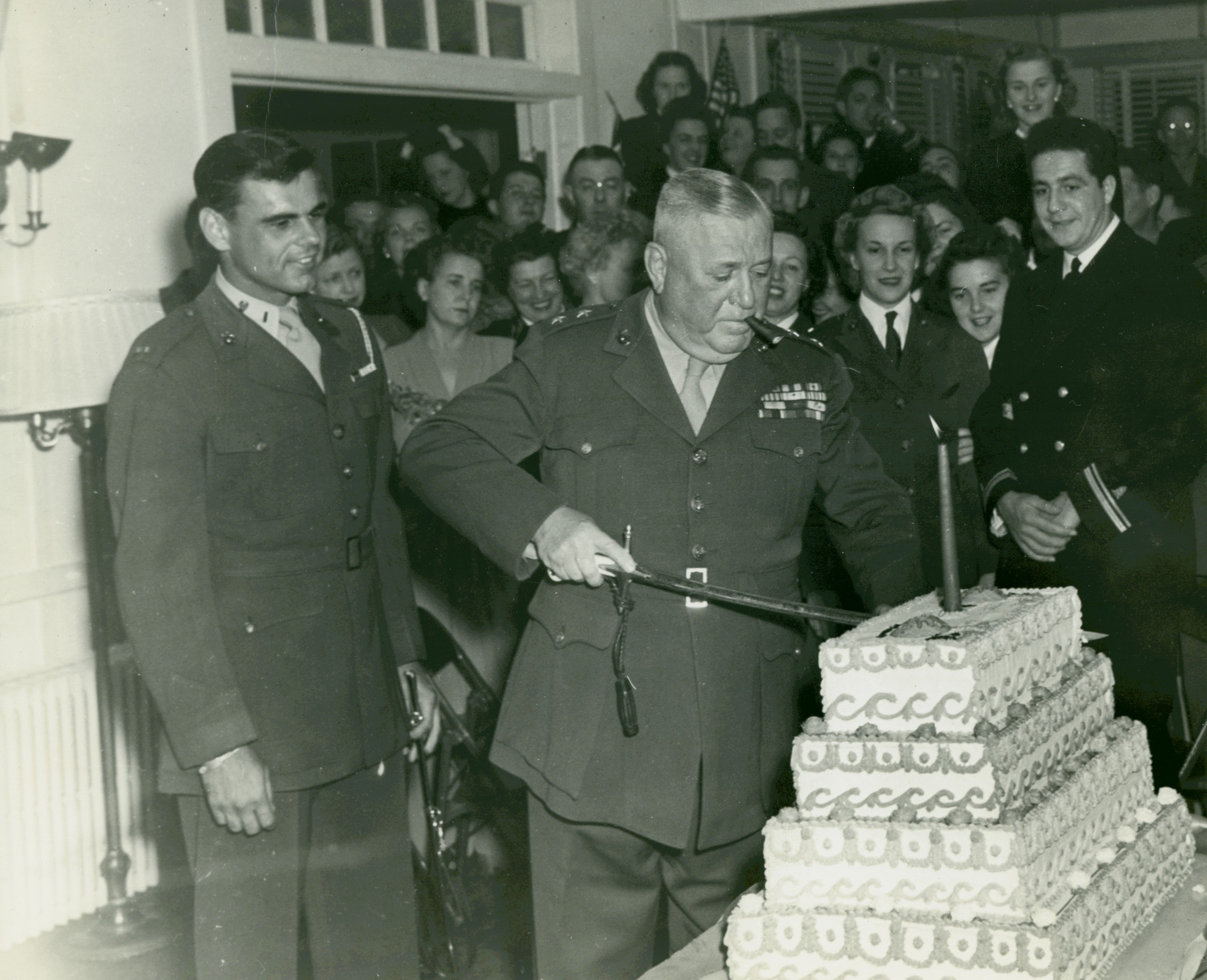
Vogel cuts a piece of cake at the Marine Corps birthday celebration in San Diego, 1943.

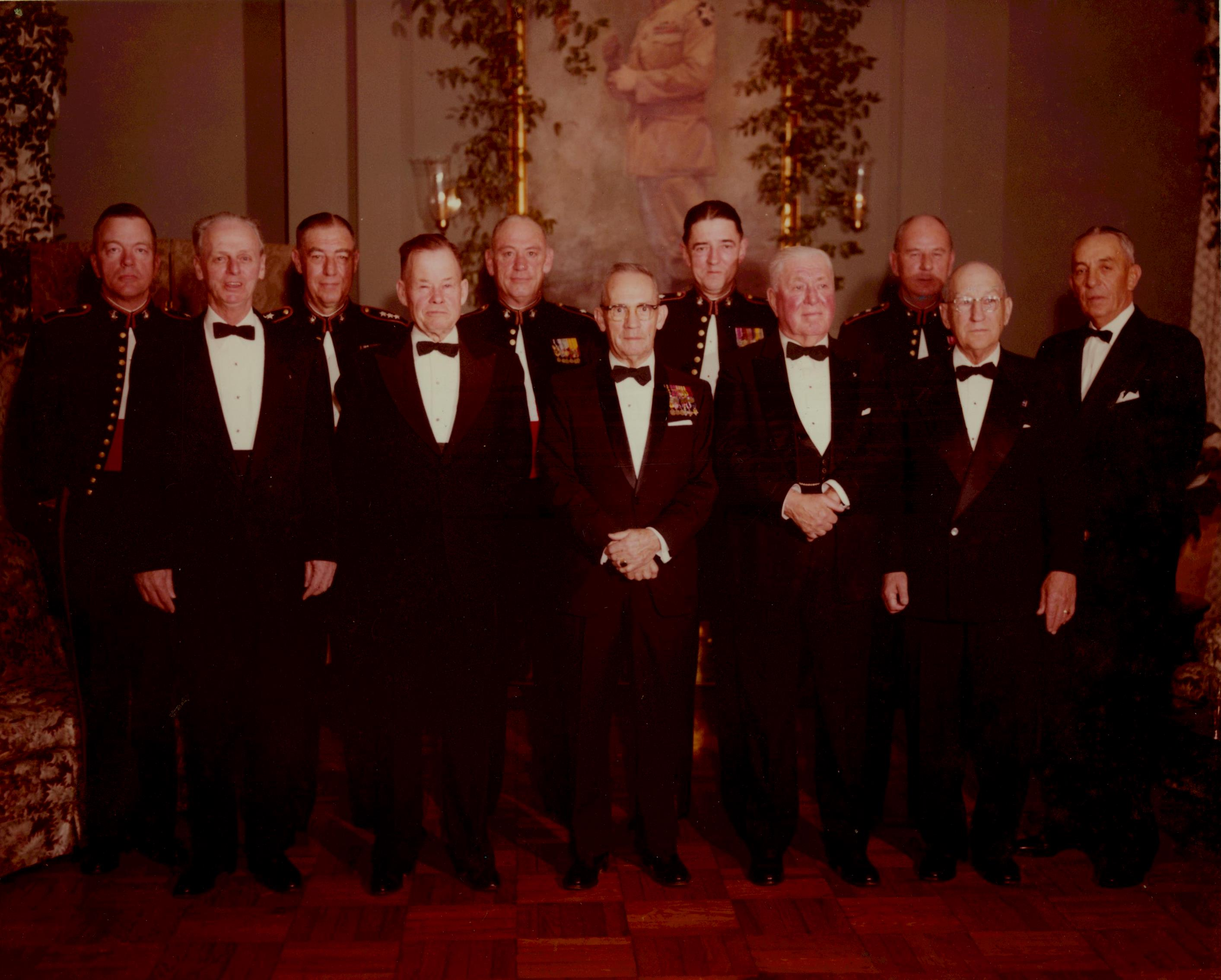
20th Anniversary of 2nd Marine Division, 1961; from left to right: BG Leonard F. Chapman Jr., GEN Franklin A. Hart ret., LTG Joseph C. Burger, LTG Lewis B. Puller ret., BG Odell M. Conoley, LTG Thomas E. Watson ret., MG James P. Berkeley, Vogel, MG Robert B. Luckey, LTG Julian C. Smith ret. and GEN Edwin A. Pollock ret.

Vogel activated 2nd Marine Division from the 2nd Marine Brigade at the beginning of February 1941 at Camp Elliott near San Diego. He oversaw the formation of the division and its initial training and was promoted to the rank of major general in May 1942. Vogel held that assignment until he was succeeded by Major General Charles F. B. Price in December 1941 and assumed command of newly formed 2nd Joint Training Force, consisting of the Army's 3rd Infantry Division and his 2nd Marine Division.

In this capacity, he was responsible for the preparation of Marines and other units for amphibious operations, but following the Japanese attack on Pearl Harbor and United States' entry into World War II, it was re-designated Amphibious Corps, Pacific Fleet and began with the preparation for combat deployment. The Amphibious Corps, Pacific Fleet was re-designated I Marine Amphibious Corps in October 1942 and Vogel sailed with that organization to the South Pacific area during the same month. His headquarters was stationed at Nouméa, New Caledonia, and Vogel held administrative responsibility for all Marine forces in the Southwest Pacific area, including all logistical and personnel matters affecting combat operations.

During the spring of 1943, Vogel received orders from Commander-in-Chief, South Pacific Area admiral William Halsey to do preliminary studies of the New Georgia Campaign. The operational discussions did not go well for Vogel and his staff, which turned in pessimistic (though realistic) estimates of the ground forces necessary to isolate, then capture New Georgia. The landing forces would come primarily from South Pacific's Army contingent. Vogel did not meet expectations of Admiral Halsey, who considered Vogel too lenient in the planning and asked Commandant Holcomb for replacement.

Vogel also complicated his situation with his fear of flying. This forced him to make every inspection tour between his units in the Pacific area only by ship, which was impractical at that time. Commandant Holcomb relieved Vogel and sent him back to the United States in August 1943.

Upon his return, he was appointed Commanding General, Fleet Marine Force, San Diego Area, with headquarters at Camp Elliott. His new command was responsible for training Marines for combat and encompassed the newly established Marine Corps Base Camp Pendleton; Camp Gillespie, the Paratroop cantonment near Santee; Camp Dunlap, the desert training center near Niland and the Training Center and Marine barracks at Camp Elliott.

Vogel was transferred to the Marine Corps Recruit Depot Parris Island, South Carolina, in May 1944 and appointed commanding general of that facility as a substitute for retiring Major General Emile P. Moses. He was responsible for the recruit training on the East Coast until his retirement on February 1, 1946, after 42 years of active service.

=== Navajo Code Talkers ===
On February 28, 1942, General Vogel tested the idea of the Navajo code talkers by "installing a telephone connection between two offices and wrote out six messages that were typical of those sent during combat. One of those messages read "Enemy expected to make tank and dive bomber attack at dawn." The Navajo managed to transmit the message almost verbatim: "Enemy tank dive bomber expected to attack this morning." The remaining messages were translated with similar proficiency, which duly impressed General Vogel.

On 6 March 1942, General Vogel wrote a letter to the Commandant of the Marine Corps Thomas Holcomb recommending the Navajo Code Talkers. The Navajo were recommended, in part, because Nazi Germany had not infiltrated the Navajo as they were the only "tribe that has not been infested with German students during the past twenty years. These Germans, studying the various tribal dialects under the guise of art students, anthropologists, etc., have undoubtedly obtained a good working knowledge of all tribal dialects except Navajo." u

== Later life ==
Vogel settled in Bedminster in Bucks County and was an hereditary Companion of the Military Order of the Loyal Legion of the United States. He was active within the Loyal Legion until his death and served as the Legion's Commander-in-Chief in 1964. He was also president of the Valley Forge Chapter of the Sons of the American Revolution. Major General Clayton B. Vogel died on November 26, 1964, in Naval Hospital Philadelphia. He is buried at Arlington National Cemetery, Virginia, together with his wife Margaret.

They had together three daughters: Margaret, Julia and Mary B. All married Marine corps officers: Julia married future marine major general Rathvon M. Tompkins and Margaret married future marine Colonel Edward W. Durant Jr. and Mary B. married future marine colonel Harry D. Wortman.

== Military awards ==
Here is the ribbon bar of Major General Clayton B. Vogel:

1st Row	Marine Corps Expeditionary Medal with two 3/16" bronze stars			
2nd Row	Mexican Service Medal	World War I Victory Medal with West Indies clasp	Second Nicaraguan Campaign Medal	American Defense Service Medal with Fleet Clasp
3rd Row	American Campaign Medal	Asiatic-Pacific Campaign Medal	World War II Victory Medal	Nicaraguan Presidential Medal of Merit with Diploma
4th Row	Haitian National Order of Honour and Merit, rank Commander	Haitian Distinguished Service Medal	Haitian Military Medal	Haitian Brevet of Merit with Diploma

== See also ==
- List of 2nd Marine Division Commanders

Military offices
Preceded by Emile P. Moses	Commanding General of the Marine Corps Recruit Depot Parris Island; May 5, 1944 – February 1, 1946	Succeeded by Samuel L. Howard
Preceded by Holland Smith	Commanding General of the Fleet Marine Force, San Diego Area; September 11, 1943 – April 20, 1944	Succeeded by Charles F. B. Price
Preceded by Unit activated	Commanding General of the I Marine Amphibious Corps; October 1, 1942 – July 1943	Succeeded by Charles D. Barrett
Preceded by William P. Upshur	Commanding General of the Fleet Marine Force, San Diego Area; December 1941 – October 1, 1942	Succeeded by Holland Smith
Preceded by Unit activated	Commanding General of the 2nd Marine Division; February 1, 1941 – December 7, 1941	Succeeded by Charles F. B. Price
Preceded by David D. Porter	Adjutant and Inspector of the Marine Corps; March 1, 1937 – August 10, 1939	Succeeded by Edward A. Ostermann
