= General Stafford (disambiguation) =

General Stafford (1868–1923) was a Major League Baseball player. General Stafford may also refer to:

- David A. Stafford (1893–1959), U.S. Marine Corps brigadier general
- Humphrey Stafford, 1st Duke of Buckingham (1402–1460), English general
- Leroy Augustus Stafford (1822–1864), Confederate States Army brigadier general
- Thomas P. Stafford (born 1930), U.S. Air Force lieutenant general
