= William W. Rogers =

United States Marine Corps general

William Walter Rogers
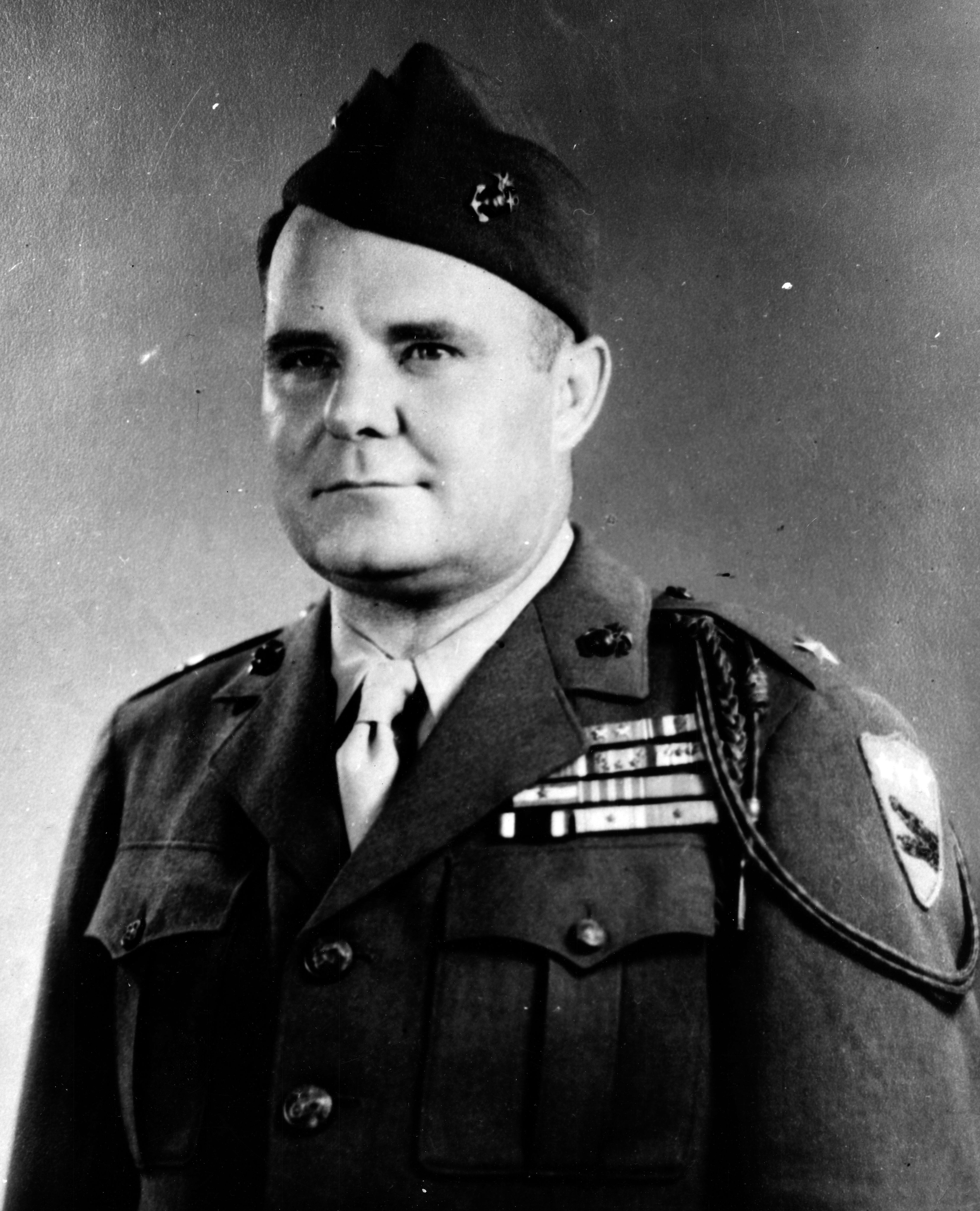
- BG William W. Rogers, USMC
- Born: December 25, 1893; Thorntown, Indiana
- Died: October 15, 1976 (aged 82); Carlsbad, California
- Military career
- Allegiance: United States of America
- Branch: United States Marine Corps
- Service years: 1917–1946
- Rank: Major general
- Service number: 0-841
- Commands: CoS of V Amphibious Corps; CoS of 4th Marine Division
- Conflicts: World War I; Battle of Belleau Wood; Battle of Soissons; Battle of Saint-Mihiel; Battle of Blanc Mont Ridge; Meuse-Argonne Offensive; Nicaraguan Campaign; World War II; Marshall Islands campaign; Battle of Kwajalein; Battle of Saipan; Battle of Tinian; Battle of Iwo Jima
- Awards: Distinguished Service Medal; Silver Star (2); Legion of Merit (3); Bronze Star Medal; Purple Heart

William Walter Rogers (December 25, 1893 – October 15, 1976) was a highly decorated officer of the United States Marine Corps with the rank of major general, who served as staff officer in the Asiatic-Pacific Theater during World War II.

== Early career ==
William W. Rogers was born on December 25, 1893, in Thorntown, Indiana. After attending local schools, he graduated with a Bachelor of Science degree from Miami University in Oxford, Ohio, in 1914. He subsequently enlisted in the Marine Corps on June 30, 1917, and was assigned to the Headquarters Company, 6th Marine Regiment. Rogers participated first in trench defensive duties near Toulon and subsequently as a corporal in the Battle of Belleau Wood and Battle of Soissons during the summer of 1918. He fought with distinction and earned his battlefield commission to second lieutenant on August 16, 1918.

Second Lieutenant Rogers was transferred to the 82nd Company, 3rd Battalion, 6th Marine Regiment and was appointed platoon leader there. He then participated in the Battle of Saint-Mihiel and was decorated with the Silver Star for gallantry in action.

At the beginning of October 1918, Rogers and his regiment participated in the Battle of Blanc Mont Ridge. On October 7, Second Lieutenant Rogers volunteered for reconnaissance mission around the small town of Saint-Étienne. After he observed the situation, he was seriously wounded by enemy fire. He was subsequently evacuated to the American Red Cross Hospital No. 1 at Paris and remained there until November 13, 1918. For his repeated gallantry in action, Rogers received his second Silver Star. He was also decorated with the Croix de guerre 1914–1918 with Gilt Star by the Government of France.

== Interwar period ==
After his recovery, Rogers rejoined his company and participated in the Allied occupation of the Rhineland with a garrison in the town of Leutesdorf, Germany until the end of July 1919. He returned to the United States on August 6, 1919, and was assigned to Marine Barracks Quantico, Virginia, a few days later.

Rogers was then transferred to Pittsburgh, Pennsylvania, where he served with the local Marine recruiting office until the end of March 1924. He was subsequently assigned to the Quartermaster Department for special two-month course. After its completing, Rogers was sent to Nicaragua, where he was appointed quartermaster officer of the Marine detachment within the American Legation Guard at Managua. He returned to the United States in August 1925 and was appointed post quartermaster at Marine Barracks Quantico, Virginia.

He served in this capacity until December 1927, when he was sent within the 2nd Brigade of Marines back to Nicaragua. He was attached to the Guardia Nacional de Nicaragua and participated in the skirmishes with Sandino's Rebels until November 1930, when he was ordered back to the United States. After his return, Rogers was assigned again to Marine Barracks Quantico.

Rogers was transferred to the Marine barracks at Washington Navy Yard in December 1931. While serving there, he attended Army Industrial College in Washington, D.C., where he learned about the resource component of national power. Subsequently, he was sent back to Quantico and assigned to the 7th Marine Regiment.

He was promoted to the rank of major on 24 May 1934 and assigned to the Headquarters Marine Corps in Washington, D.C., where he served for the next two years. After another one-year tour of duty at Quantico Base, Major Rogers was sent to Newport, Rhode Island, where he attended a senior course at Naval War College. Following graduation in June 1938, he was appointed Division Marine Officer of the Battle Force, Division Two. Rogers was promoted to the rank of lieutenant colonel a few days later on 29 June 1938.

== World War II ==
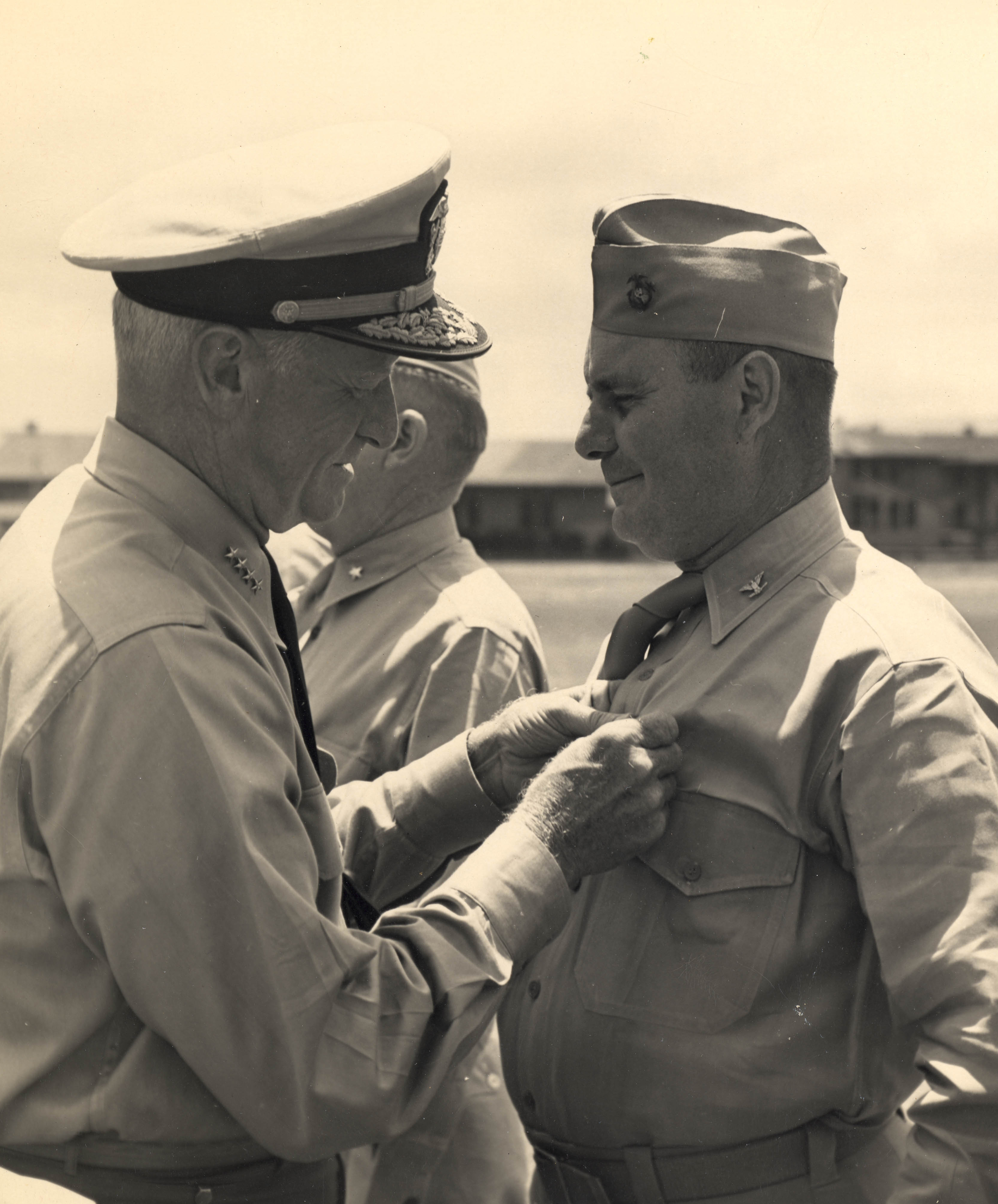
Colonel William W. Rogers, USMC being decorated with the Legion of Merit by Admiral Chester Nimitz

In July 1940, Rogers was assigned to the Headquarters Marine Corps in Washington, D.C., where he was appointed officer in charge of Training Section, Plans and Policies Division. While in this capacity, he was promoted to the rank of colonel on May 20, 1942.

On 14 August 1943, Colonel Rogers joined the staff of the newly created 4th Marine Division under the command of Major General Harry Schmidt. He was appointed 4th Marine Division Chief of Staff on the same date.

The 4th Division went overseas in January 1944 and Rogers participated in combat at Roi-Namur in the Battle of Kwajalein. Despite intense enemy sniper fire, he personally observed the situation at shore and helped coordinate military operations. He was later decorated with the Legion of Merit for his service during this battle.

Rogers later served during the battles at Saipan and Tinian and received another two Legions of Merit for each operation. He also received the Navy Presidential Unit Citation.

Rogers' former superior officer, Major General Harry Schmidt, was promoted to the capacity of Commander of V Amphibious Corps (VAC) in July 1944. Schmidt requested Colonel Rogers for capacity of VAC Chief of Staff. Rogers was subsequently relieved from the 4th Marine Division by Colonel Merton J. Batchelder on 10 August 1944.

Colonel Rogers was promoted to the rank of brigadier general on 15 February 1945 and subsequently participated in the bloody Battle of Iwo Jima. He distinguished himself again and was decorated with the Distinguished Service Medal for "exceptionally meritorious service in a position of great responsibility as Chief of Staff of the V Amphibious Corps Landing Force, prior to and during the assault and seizure of enemy-held Iwo Jima". He also received another Navy Presidential Unit Citation for this battle.

General Rogers simultaneously served as liaison with the headquarters of Walter Krueger's Sixth Army and also participated in the planning of an assault on Japanese homeland (Operation Downfall) and its subsequent occupation. The invasion was cancelled after the unconditional Japanese surrender on 15 August 1945. Nevertheless, Rogers was decorated with the Bronze Star Medal for his part in the planning of the invasion.

He was appointed Commanding General Service Command, Fleet Marine Force, Pacific in December 1945 and was succeeded by Brigadier General Dudley S. Brown within V Amphibious Corps. Rogers was placed on the retired list on 1 December 1946 and also advanced to the rank of major general for having been specially commended in combat.

After retirement from the Marine Corps, Rogers lived with his wife Louise Tarry Rogers in Carlsbad, California, where he died on October 15, 1976.

== Decorations ==

1st row	Navy Distinguished Service Medal			
2nd row	Silver Star with Oak Leaf Cluster	Legion of Merit with two 5/16" gold stars	Bronze Star Medal	Purple Heart
3rd row	Navy Presidential Unit Citation with one star	Navy Unit Commendation	Marine Corps Expeditionary Medal	World War I Victory Medal with five battle clasps
4th row	Army of Occupation of Germany Medal	Second Nicaraguan Campaign Medal	American Defense Service Medal with Fleet Clasp	American Campaign Medal
5th row	Asiatic-Pacific Campaign Medal with four 3/16 inch service stars	World War II Victory Medal	Navy Occupation Service Medal	Croix de guerre 1914–1918 with Gilt Star (France)
