= I Marine Amphibious Corps =

1st Marine Amphibious Corps
- 1st Marine Amphibious Corps insignia
- Active: 1 October 1942 to 15 April 1944
- Country: United States
- Branch: USMC
- Engagements: Invasion of Bougainville

The I Marine Amphibious Corps, or I MAC, was a formation of the United States Marine Corps. It was created on 1 October 1942, with most of the staff transferred from Amphibious Corps, Pacific Fleet (ACPF). It was then deployed to the South Pacific Area – a U.S.-led multinational military command active during World War II that was a part of the U.S. Pacific Ocean Areas – first to Hawaii, then to New Caledonia.

== History ==
When the Marine Corps was not satisfied with the leadership of its commander, Major General Clayton B. Vogel, Commandant Thomas Holcomb ordered Alexander Vandegrift to take command. Vandegrift, the commander of the 1st Marine Division during the Battle of Guadalcanal was promoted to lieutenant general.

General Vandegrift carried on in command of the Corps when its next-designated commander for the invasion of Bougainville, Major General Charles D. Barrett, died following a fall from the balcony of his quarters in New Caledonia. General Vandegrift led I MAC during the invasion and was later made the Commandant.

The Corps consisted of the 3rd Marine Division, the 37th Infantry Division (United States), the 8th Brigade (New Zealand) and the 53rd Naval Construction Battalion (Seabees). It conducted the invasion of Bougainville. When the 53rd was assigned to the Marine Corps it was redesignated "Naval Construction Battalion First Marine Amphibious Corps"

On 15 April 1944, I MAC was renamed the III Amphibious Corps.

== Command structure ==
=== Commanding generals ===
- Major General Clayton B. Vogel: 1 October 1942 – July 1943
- Major General Alexander Vandegrift: July 1943 – 27 September 1943
- Major General Charles D. Barrett: 27 September 1943 – 8 October 1943
- Major General Alexander Vandegrift: 8 October 1943 – 1 November 1943
- Major General Roy S. Geiger: 9 November 1943 – 30 June 1945 (as III Amphibious Corps)
- Major General Keller E. Rockey: 30 June 1945 – 10 June 1946

=== Chiefs of Staff ===
- Brigadier general Archie F. Howard: 1 October 1942 – July 1943
- Colonel Gerald C. Thomas: July 1943 – 9 November 1943
- Brigadier general Alfred H. Noble: 10 November 1943 – 17 December 1943
- Brigadier general Oscar R. Cauldwell: 18 December 1943 – January 1944
- Brigadier general Merwin H. Silverthorn: January 1944–30 June 1945
- Brigadier general William A. Worton: 30 June 1945 – 10 June 1946

=== Corps Artillery commanders ===
- Brigadier general Pedro del Valle: April 1944 – October 1944
- Brigadier general David R. Nimmer

=== Personnel Officer (C-1) ===
- Lieutenant Colonel Joseph C. Burger: October 1942 – November 1943
- Colonel William J. Scheyer: November 1943 – September 1944
- Colonel Gale T. Cummings

=== Intelligence Officer (C-2) ===
- Lieutenant Colonel William F. Coleman
- Lieutenant Colonel Sidney S. Wade

=== Operations Officer (C-3) ===
- Lieutenant Colonel Merrill B. Twining
- Lieutenant Colonel Edward W. Snedeker: September 1943 – December 1943
- Colonel Walter A. Wachtler: December 1943 – July 1945

=== Logistics Officer (C-4) ===
- Colonel Leonard E. Rea
- Lieutenant Colonel Frederick L. Wieseman: August 1943 – August 1944
- Colonel Francis B. Loomis Jr.: August 1944 – July 1945
- Colonel Earl S. Piper: July 1945 – July 1946

=== Plans Officer (C-5) ===
- Colonel Dudley S. Brown: October 1942 – July 1943
- Colonel Elmer H. Salzman
- Colonel Benjamin W. Gally: July 1945 – 24 June 1946

== Insignia ==
The Corps' insignia was a shield with a blue field emblazoned by the Southern Cross constellation in white and a square red diamond outlined with a white border, center. Various elements of the Corps used this basic design with their task insignia in white on the red center.

- plain red diamond – Corps Headquarters
- Anti-aircraft cannon – Defense battalion
- Balloon – Barrage Balloon Battalion
- Crossed cannons – Artillery
- Parachute – Paratroops
- Skull – Raider battalions
- Star – Supply and Service
- Winged Engineer Castle – Aviation Engineers
- The 1st Marine Division adopted the basic design with the number One emblazoned with the word Guadalcanal.
- 23 – Later the 23rd Marines adopted the basic design without white outlining the diamond.

== See also ==
- List of corps of the United States
- 1st Marine Division
- 23rd Marine Regiment
- Marine Raiders
