= V Amphibious Corps =

WW2 US Marine Corps formation

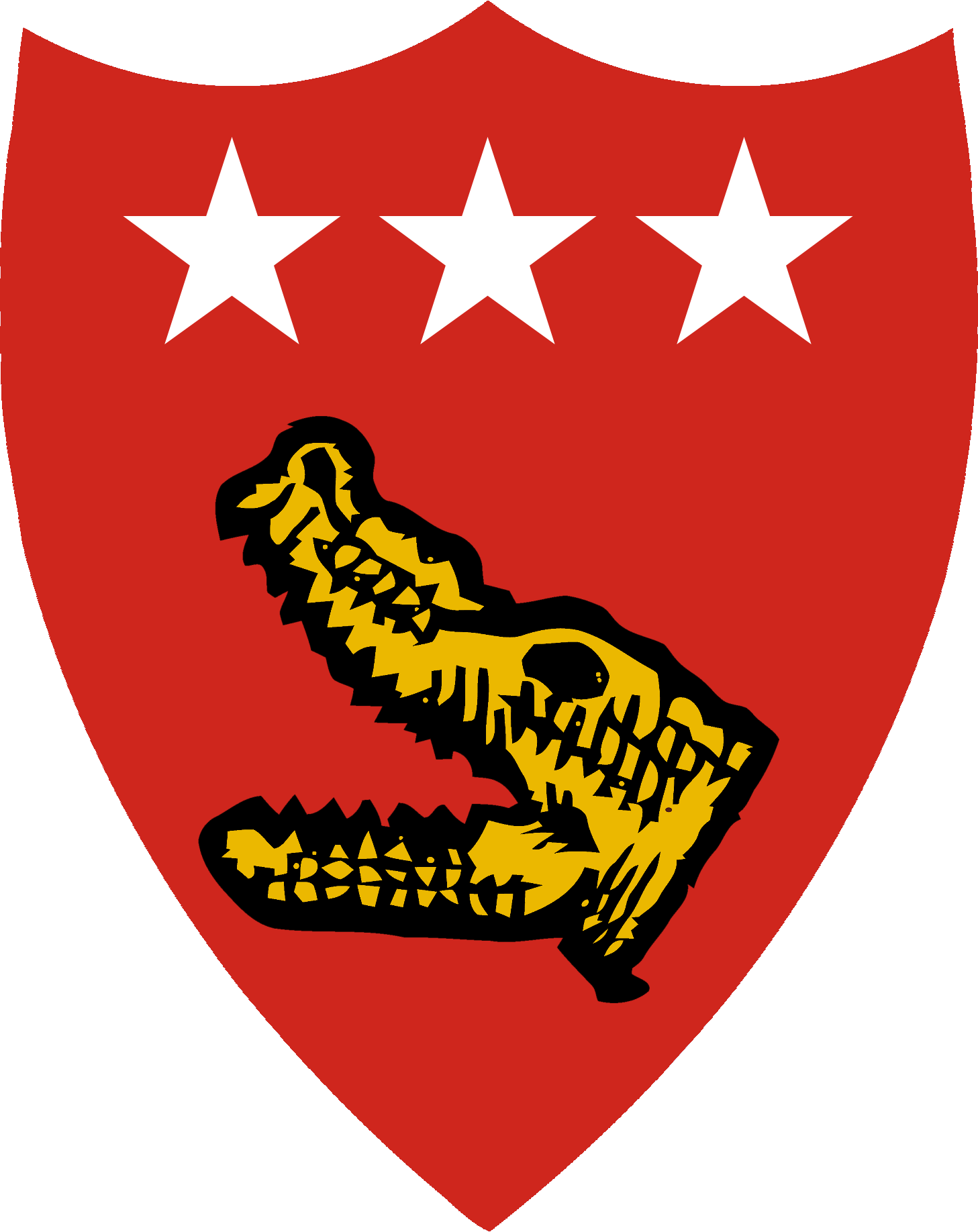
- Active: 25 August 1943 – 15 February 1946
- Allegiance: United States of America
- Branch: United States Marine Corps
- Type: Marine Air-Ground Task Force
- Role: Expeditionary combat force
- Size: Corp
- Part of: Inactive
- Engagements: World War II: Battle of Tarawa; Battle of Makin; Battle of Kwajalein; Battle of Eniwetok; Battle of Saipan; Battle of Tinian; Battle of Leyte; Battle of Iwo Jima

Commanders
- Notable commanders: Harry Schmidt; Holland Smith

The V Amphibious Corps (VAC) was a formation of the United States Marine Corps which was composed of the 3rd, 4th and 5th Marine Divisions in World War II. The three divisions were the amphibious landing force for the United States Fifth Fleet with two goals, removal of Japanese forces from islands so U.S. Seabees could build advance bases to project US power. In doing this VAC was notably involved in the battles for Tarawa, Saipan, and Iwo Jima. V Amphibious Corps was commanded by General Holland 'Howlin Mad' Smith followed by General Harry Schmidt.

== History ==
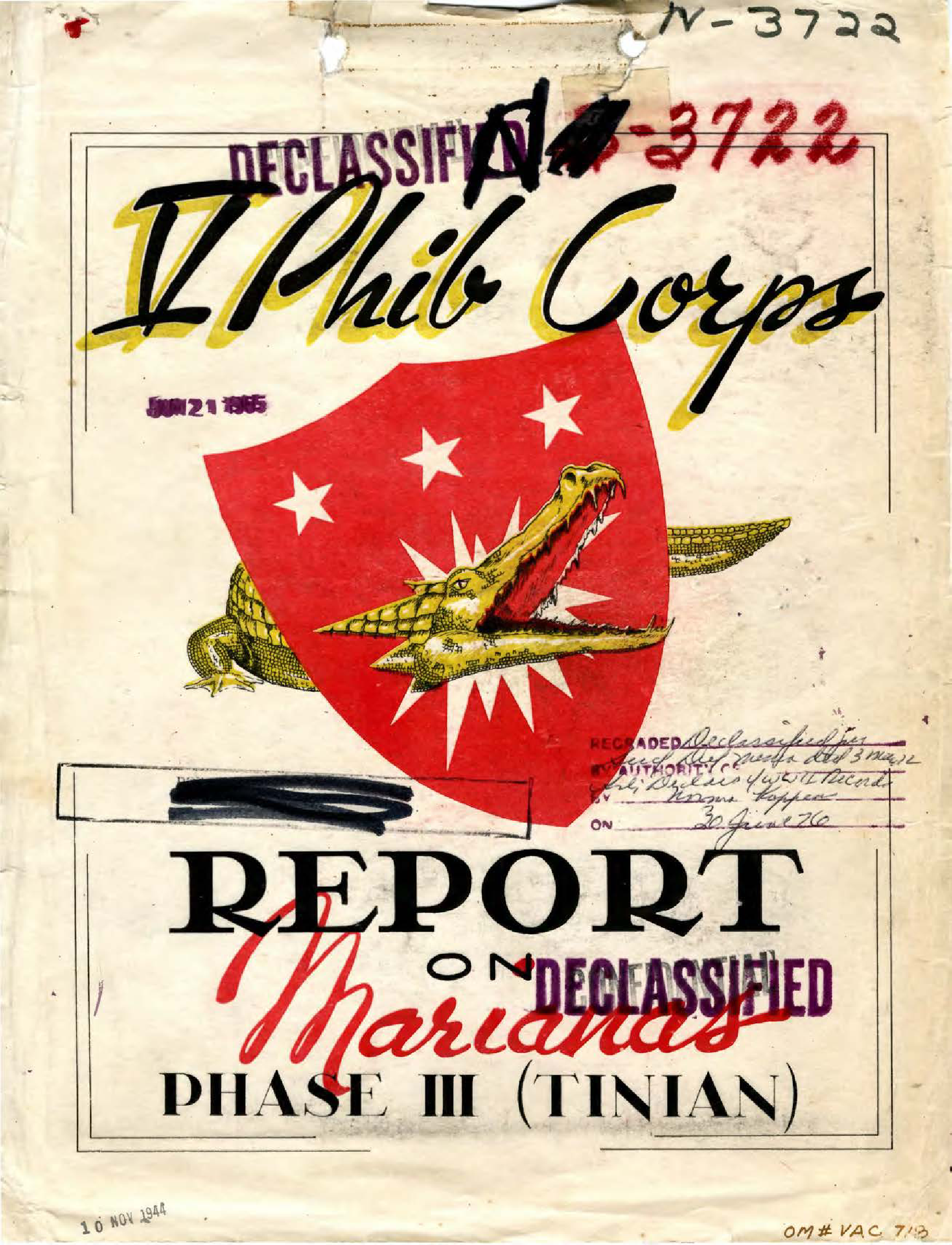
Cover of V Phib Corps Marianas Report on Phase III (Tinian)

The V Amphibious Corps (formerly Amphibious Corps, Pacific Fleet; ACPF) was formed on 25 August 1943 at Camp Elliot, California. In September 1943, it moved to Pearl Harbor, Hawaii.

== Structure ==
The structure of a United States Marine Corps' amphibious corps by 1945, was broken down into four major subordinate commands with each of them having numerous sub-elements:

- The first major element of the Corps was three reinforced Marine infantry divisions.
- The second was the Corps artillery, which was composed of a field artillery group made of three battalions of 155mm howitzers, three battalions of 155mm guns, and an Antiaircraft Artillery Group made of three antiaircraft artillery battalions.
- The third was the Amphibian Tractor Group, which was made up of four amphibian tractor battalions and an armored amphibian tractor battalion.
- The fourth was the Corps Troops, which was composed of a headquarters and service battalion, administrative command, signal battalion, medical battalion, motor transport battalion, engineer battalion, reconnaissance battalion, and military police battalion.

== Subordinate units ==
The US Marine Corps, US Army, and Naval Construction Force commands that served under the V Amphibious Corps in World War II include:

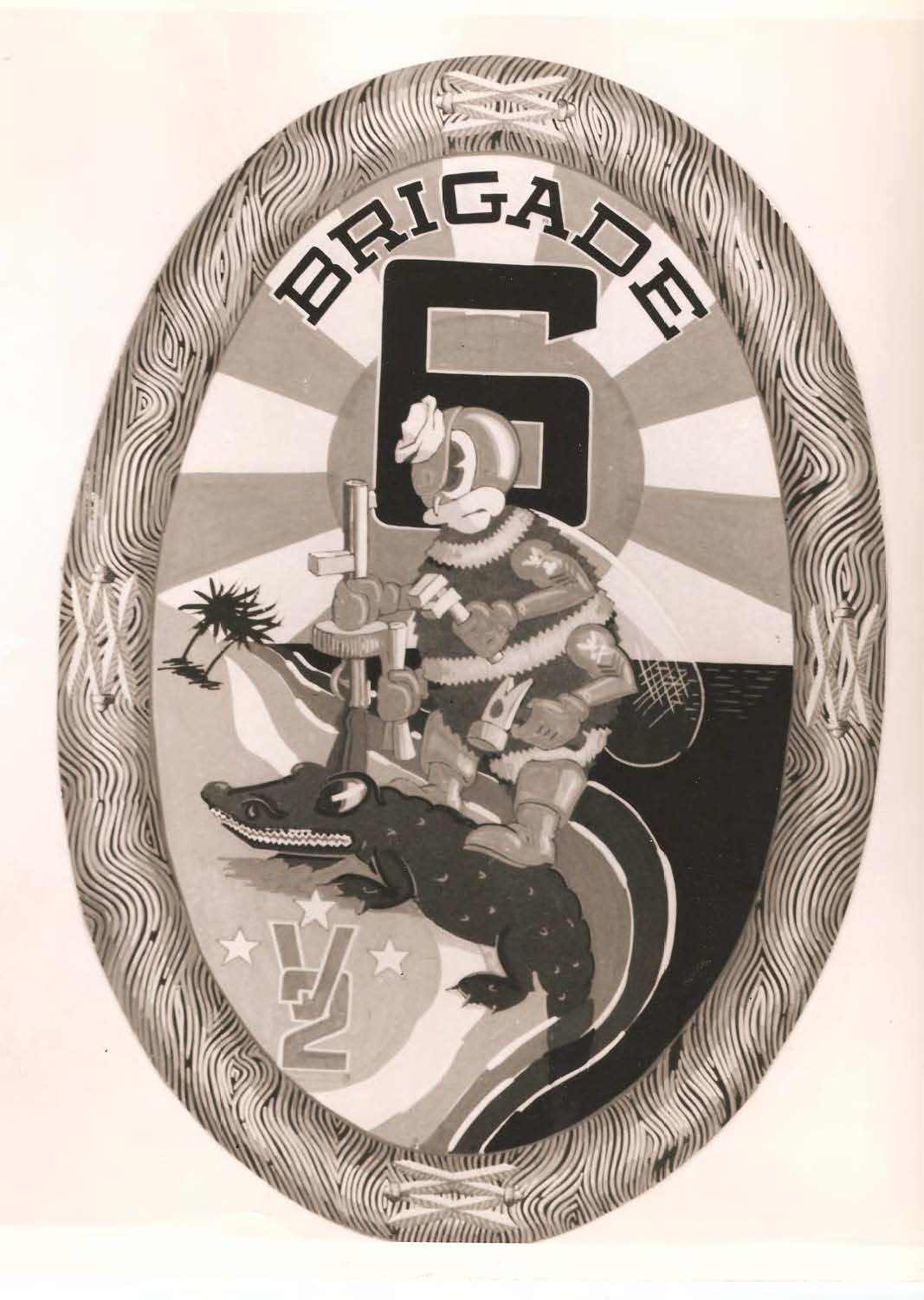
6th Naval Construction Brigade insignia incorporating the Alligator and 3 stars of V Amphibious Corps.

Marine Corps

- 2nd Marine Division
- 3rd Marine Division
- 4th Marine Division
- 5th Marine Division
- Amphibious Reconnaissance Battalion [formerly "Company"]

Army

- XXIV Corps Artillery
- 7th Infantry Division
- 27th Infantry Division
- 32nd Infantry Division

Navy

- 6th Naval Construction Brigade (thus CB, a.k.a. Seabee) (Tinian and Saipan)
- 9th Naval Construction Brigade (Iwo Jima)

== Command and Staff ==
=== Corps Commanders ===
- Lieutenant General Holland M. Smith: 25 August 1943 – 11 July 1944
- Major General Harry Schmidt: 12 July 1944 – 15 February 1946 (Deactivation)

=== Chiefs of Staff ===
- Brigadier General Graves B. Erskine: August 1943 - August 1944
- Brigadier General William W. Rogers: August 1944 - December 1945
- Brigadier General Dudley S. Brown: December 1945 - February 1946

=== Corps Artillery ===
- Brigadier general Thomas E. Bourke
- Colonel John S. Letcher (July 1944 - June 1945)

=== Personnel Officers ===
- Lieutenant Colonel Albert F. Metze
- Colonel David A. Stafford (October 1944 - February 1946)

=== Intelligence Officers ===
- Lieutenant Colonel St. Julien R. Marshall: August 1943 - October 1944
- Colonel Thomas R. Yancey (USA)

=== Operations Officers ===
- Colonel John C. McQueen (August 1943 - August 1944)
- Colonel Edward A. Craig (August 1944 - April 1945)
- Colonel Walter W. Wensinger (April 1945 - February 1946)

=== Logistics Officers ===
- Colonel Raymond E. Knapp (August 1943 - April 1944)
- Colonel William F. Brown

== Unit awards ==
A unit citation or commendation is an award bestowed upon an organization for the action cited. Members of the unit who participated in said actions are allowed to wear on their uniforms the appropriate ribbon of the awarded unit citation. V Amphibious Corps has been awarded the following:

Streamer	Award	Year(s)	Additional Info
	Presidential Unit Citation Streamer	1945	Iwo Jima
	Navy Unit Commendation Streamer	1945	Iwo Jima
	Asiatic-Pacific Campaign Streamer with four Bronze Stars	1943-1946	Gilbert Islands, Marshall Islands, Marianas Islands, Iwo Jima
	World War II Victory Streamer	1943–1946	Pacific War

== See also ==
- Marine Air-Ground Task Force
- History of the United States Marine Corps
- Organization of the United States Marine Corps
