= David A. Stafford =

United States Marine Corps general

David Anderson Stafford
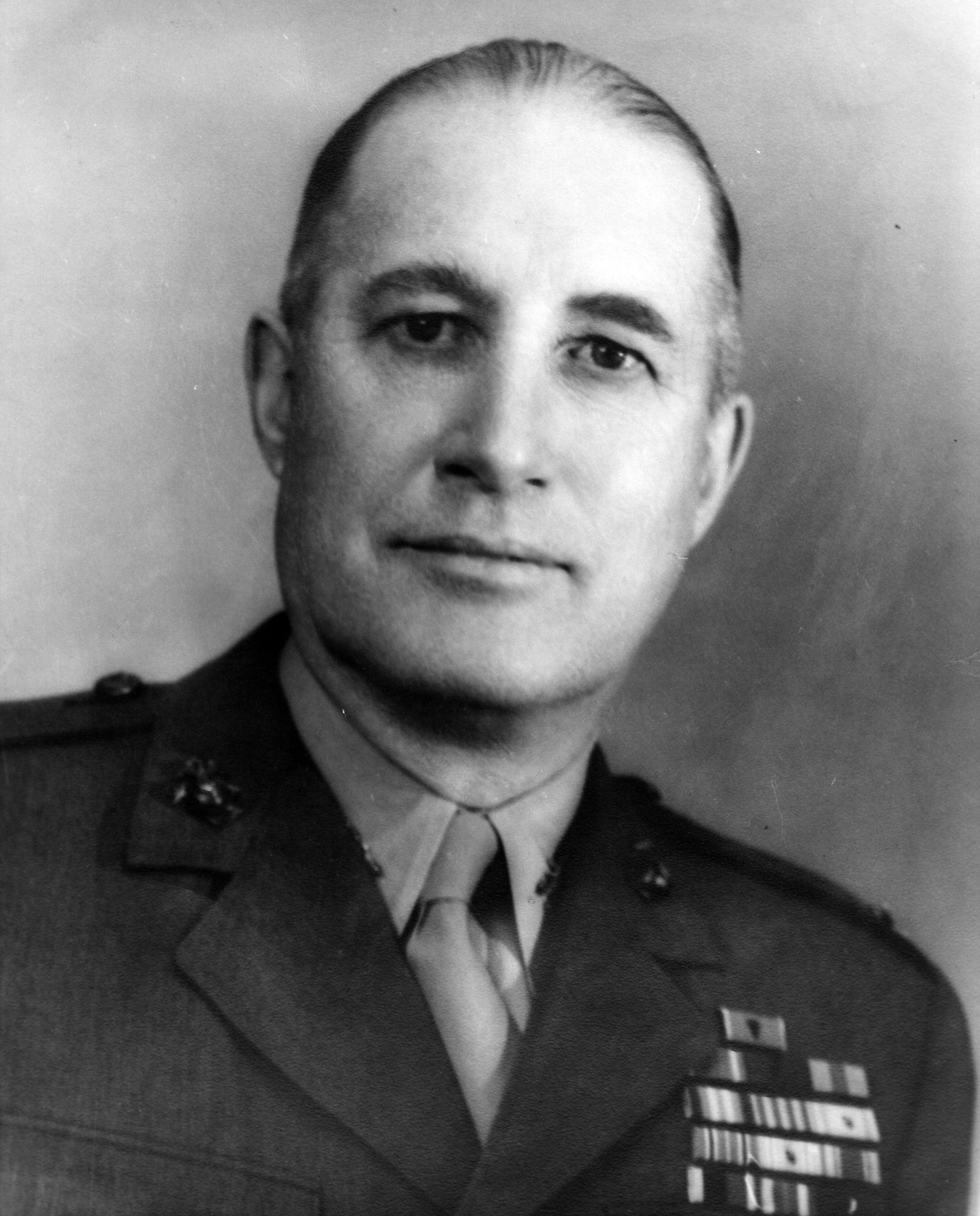
- Stafford as colonel, USMC
- Born: October 16, 1893; Plattsburgh, New York, US
- Died: July 21, 1959 (aged 65); Spokane, Washington, US
- Military career
- Allegiance: United States
- Branch: United States Marine Corps
- Service years: 1917–1949
- Rank: Brigadier general
- Service number: 0-936
- Commands: Marine Corps Intelligence; G-1 of V Amphibious Corps
- Conflicts: World War I; Banana Wars; Haitian Campaign; Nicaraguan Campaign; World War II; Battle of Iwo Jima
- Awards: Legion of Merit; Navy Commendation Medal

David Anderson Stafford (October 16, 1893 – July 21, 1959) was a decorated officer of the United States Marine Corps with the rank of brigadier general. He is most noted for his service as assistant chief of staff for personnel (G-1) of V Amphibious Corps during Battle of Iwo Jima.

== Early career ==
David A. Stafford was born on October 16, 1893, in Plattsburgh, New York, as the son of Dexter A. Stafford and his wife Elizabeth. His father was a Republican politician and local commissioner of elections in Plattsburgh. Following the attending of high school, young David received a state scholarship at prestigious Cornell University in Ithaca, New York. He graduated in summer of 1917 with Bachelor of Arts degree and enlisted the United States Marine Corps as many other young men eager to see combat in France.

However he was stationed at Marine Barracks Quantico, Virginia, and reached the Non-commissioned rank. Stafford was decorated with Marine Corps Good Conduct Medal for his exemplary service and selected for the Marine Officers' School for Service Afloat at Norfolk Navy Yard. He was commissioned second lieutenant in late 1918, but the war had ended prior to his assignment to duty at sea during the First World War.

He was subsequently attached to the Marine detachment aboard the armored cruiser USS Pittsburgh and took part in the voyage to Adriatic Sea, Aegean Sea, and Black Sea, where he joined in the massive relief operations and other humanitarian concerns with which the navy carried out its quasi-diplomatic functions in this troubled area.

In early 1924, Stafford was promoted to the rank of first lieutenant and sailed to Haiti with 1st Marine Brigade. He participated in the jungle patrols against bandits for next two years and after brief stay in the United States, Stafford sailed again for expeditionary duty back to Caribbean. He was ordered to Nicaragua as a member of 5th Marine Regiment in January 1927 and took part in the combats against hostile rebel bandits under Augusto César Sandino. Stafford was later transferred to the Constabulary Detachment of the Nicaraguan National Guard and served as instructor until 1931. He was decorated with Nicaraguan Presidential Medal of Merit and also received Nicaraguan Cross for Valor.

Following his return to the United States, Stafford served as Inspector-Instructor with the 103rd Company, 7th Reserve Regiment at Naval Ammunition Depot Iona Island. He was ordered for the Company Officers' Course at the Marine Corps Schools, Quantico in 1932 and upon the graduation one year later, Stafford served as Company commanding officer with the Civilian Conservation Corps in Maine. He then served with the Marine barracks at Naval Submarine Base New London and received promotion to the rank of captain in November 1934.

Stafford then assumed command of Marine detachment aboard the battleship USS West Virginia and took part in the patrol cruises off the coast of Hawaii. In April 1939, he was ordered to the Headquarters Marine Corps in Washington, D.C., as officer in charge of Marine Corps Intelligence, Division of Plans and Policies and remained in that capacity until August 1940.

== World War II ==
A promotion to the rank of major followed after the graduation from Senior Course at Marine Corps Schools, Quantico in early 1941. Stafford then assumed command of 5th Provisional Marine Company and sailed for Trinidad and Tobago, British West Indies in March 1941. He and his men were tasked with protection of naval civil engineers and contractors, who were ordered there one month earlier for construction of the Naval Air Station and Naval Operating Base.

The base was commissioned on August 1 of that year and Stafford served as commander of the Marine Barracks there. He was promoted to the rank of lieutenant colonel in January 1942 and to colonel in May of the same year. He was also decorated with Navy Commendation Medal for his part in the construction of the Naval Station Trinidad.

Stafford returned to the States in November 1942 and was attached to the Division of Plans and Policies at Headquarters Marine Corps under Brigadier General Gerald C. Thomas. He served in this capacity until the end of October 1944, when he was finally ordered to the Pacific area. Stafford was ordered to Pearl Harbor, Hawaii and attached to the staff of V Amphibious Corps under Major General Harry Schmidt as assistant chief of staff for personnel (G-1).

In this capacity, Stafford was responsible for Corps personnel matters and took part in the amphibious landing during Battle of Iwo Jima in February 1945. He distinguished himself and received the Legion of Merit with Combat "V".

== Postwar service ==
Following the surrender of Japan, Stafford sailed with V Amphibious Corps to Kyushu for occupation duty. He returned to the States in February 1946 and following the deactivation of the Corps during the same month, Stafford was appointed Personnel officer of the Marine Training and Replacement command at Camp Pendleton. He served again under general Schmidt and was promoted to the capacity of chief of staff within that command. Stafford also served as Inspector of 1st Marine Division, before he was appointed commanding officer of the Marine barracks at Bremerton Navy Yard in late 1947.

Stafford retired from the Marine Corps on June 30, 1949, after 32 years of active service, and was advanced to the rank of brigadier general for having been specially commended in combat. He settled in Spokane, Washington, and died there on July 32, 1959. Stafford was buried at local Holy Cross Cemetery together with his wife, Mae Norton Stafford. They had together one son and daughter.

== Decorations ==
Here is the ribbon bar of Brigadier General David A. Stafford:

1st Row	Legion of Merit with Combat "V"			
2nd Row	Navy Commendation Medal	Marine Corps Good Conduct Medal	Marine Corps Expeditionary Medal	World War I Victory Medal
3rd Row	Second Nicaraguan Campaign Medal	American Defense Service Medal with Base clasp	American Campaign Medal	Asiatic-Pacific Campaign Medal with one 3/16" service star
4th Row	World War II Victory Medal	Navy Occupation Service Medal	Nicaraguan Presidential Order of Merit with Gold star	Nicaraguan Cross of Valor and Diploma
