= Hatchechubbee, Alabama =

- Unincorporated community
- Location within Alabama Location within the United States
- Coordinates: 32°16′15″N 85°16′33″W
- Country: United States
- State: Alabama
- County: Russell
- Elevation: 318 ft (97 m)
- Time zone: UTC-6 (Central (CST))
  - Summer (DST): UTC-5 (CDT)
- ZIP code: 36858
- Area code: 334
- GNIS feature ID: 119839

Hatchechubbee is an unincorporated community in Russell County, Alabama, United States. Hatchechubbee is located at the junction of Alabama State Route 26 and County Route 65, 6.5 miles (10.5 km) west-southwest of Seale. Hatchechubbee has a post office with ZIP code 36858, which opened on August 17, 1855. The community's name is derived from the Creek words hachi meaning "creek" and chaba meaning "halfway".

== Demographics ==
Historical population
Census	Pop.	Note	%±
1880	148		—
U.S. Decennial Census

Hatchechubbee appeared on the 1880 U.S. Census as having 148 residents. This was the only time it was listed on the census rolls as a separate community.

== Notable person ==
- Holland Smith, United States Marine Corps General and "father" of modern U.S. amphibious warfare
