= Charles D. Barrett =

US Marine Corps general (1885–1943)

Charles Dodson Barrett
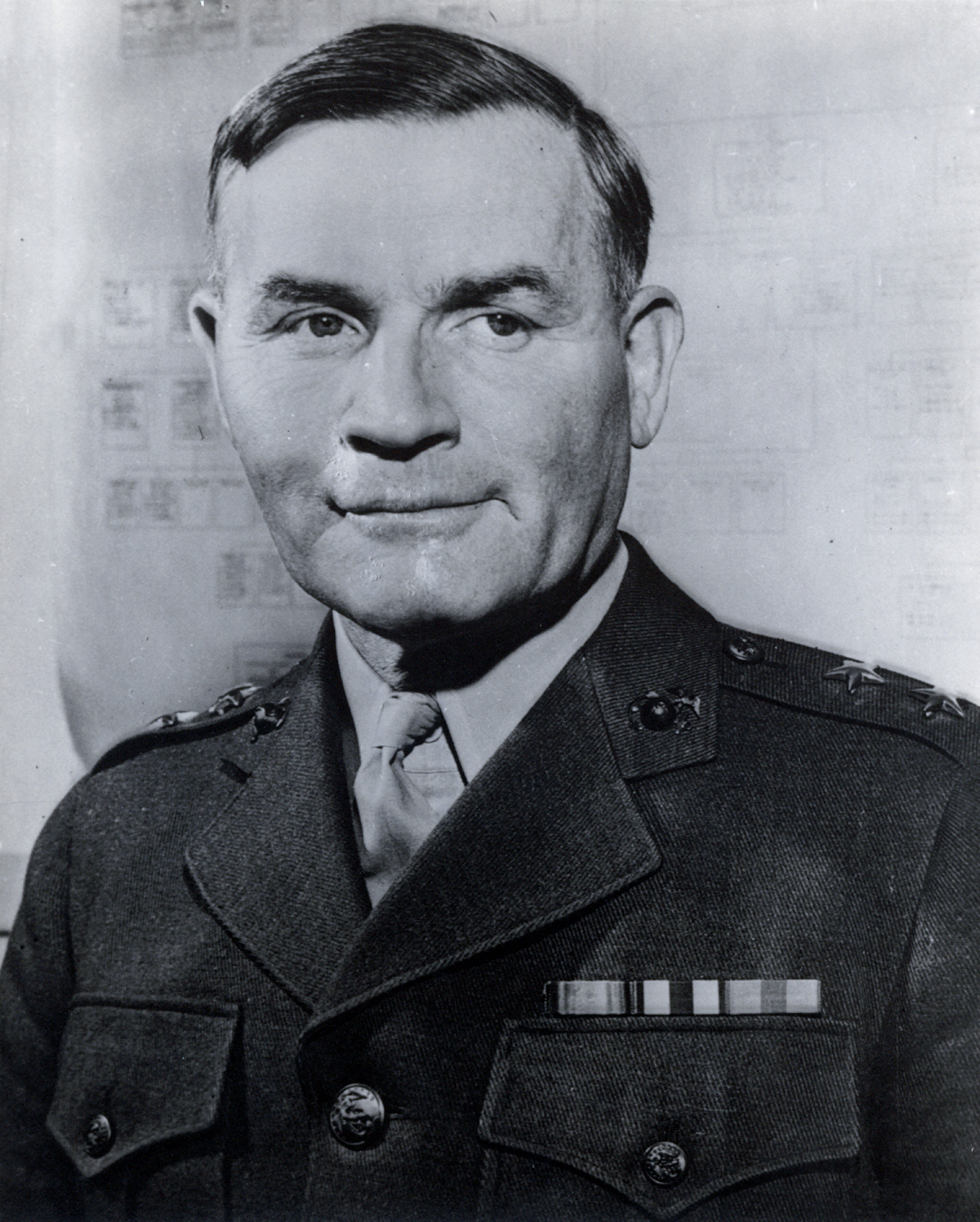
- MajGen Charles D. Barrett
- Born: August 16, 1885; Henderson, Kentucky, U.S.
- Died: October 8, 1943 (aged 58); Noumea, New Caledonia
- Burial place: Arlington National Cemetery
- Military career
- Allegiance: United States
- Branch: United States Marine Corps
- Service years: 1909–1943
- Rank: Major General
- Commands: Assistant Commandant of the Marine Corps; 5th Marines; 3rd Marine Brigade; 3rd Marine Division; I Marine Amphibious Corps
- Conflicts: Mexican Revolution; Occupation of Veracruz; World War I; Meuse-Argonne Offensive; Occupation of the Dominican Republic; World War II
- Awards: Distinguished Service Medal

Major General Charles Dodson Barrett (16 August 1885 – 8 October 1943) was the first commanding general of the 3rd Marine Division. He died while on duty in the South Pacific, 8 October 1943. He was posthumously awarded the Distinguished Service Medal in recognition of his outstanding service during World War II. Camp Barrett, home of The Basic School at Marine Corps Base Quantico is named after him.

== Biography ==
Barrett was born on 16 August 1885, at Henderson, Kentucky. Charles was the fifth of six children to Kate Waller Barrett (1857–1925) and Reverend Robert South Barrett (1851–1896). He graduated from high school in Alexandria, Virginia. He was commissioned a U.S. Marine Corps second lieutenant on 11 August 1909. He was assigned duty at the Marine Officers School, Port Royal, South Carolina, the following month. In January 1911, Barrett began a few months duty at the Marine Barracks, Boston, Massachusetts, and was detached on 23 May 1911 to report to the U.S. Naval Academy, Annapolis, Maryland, to command the Marine Detachment aboard the battleship USS Indiana. On 3 September 1911, he transferred to USS New Jersey.

Barrett landed with the detachment of USS New Jersey at Vera Cruz, Mexico, on 22 April 1914, and participated in the capture of that city. He was detached from the New Jersey on 13 December 1914 to the Marine Barracks, Norfolk, Virginia.

Barrett's World War I duty included detached service with the United States Army in France from 25 September 1918. He participated in the Meuse-Argonne Offensive of November 1–3, 1918, and in the spring of 1919 was in command of the 2nd Battalion, 367th Infantry at LeMans, France. Detached from the army in April, he reported to the commanding general of 4th Brigade, Marines, at Niederbieber, Germany, and was detailed as adjutant from 11 April. He arrived back in the United States on 3 August 1919.

From 1921 to 1922, Barrett served in Santo Domingo and from 1924 to 1927 was a member of the American Battle Monuments Commission, Washington, D.C. He then returned to France to study at the Ecole de Guerre in Paris, and from 1929 to 1933 served as an instructor at the Marine Corps Basic Schools, Quantico, Virginia. During the next two years, he was assigned to the Division of Operations and Training, Headquarters Marine Corps, Washington, and from 1935 to 1936 served aboard ship as Division Marine Officer of Battleship Division 4, U.S. Battle Force.

Upon completion of sea duty with the Battle Force, Barrett spent two and one-half years in the War Plans Section, Office of the Chief of Naval Operations, Washington, D.C.; and from August 1939 to June 1940, commanded the 5th Marines, 1st Marine Brigade, Fleet Marine Force. He returned to Headquarters, Washington, in July 1940, serving first as director of the Division of Plans and Policies. Later he served as assistant to the Commandant of the Marine Corps, Lieutenant General Thomas Holcomb, from November 1941 to March 1942.

In March 1942, General Barrett assumed command of the 3rd Marine Brigade, and the following month embarked with the brigade for Samoa, where he welded his command into a fighting unit. He was ordered to the United States in September 1942 to assume command of the 3rd Marine Division, then being organized at Camp Elliot, San Diego, California, and was promoted to major general on assuming this command. Major General Barrett was the 3rd Marine Division's first commander.

Early in 1943, he embarked with elements of the 3rd Marine Division for Auckland, New Zealand. By August 1943, he had all the major units of his division stationed on Guadalcanal, training intensively for the Bougainville operation.

On 15 September 1943, General Barrett relinquished command of the 3rd Marine Division; and on 27 September 1943, Major General Barrett replaced Lieutenant General Alexander Vandegrift as the commanding general of the First Marine Amphibious Corps (IMAC) (headquartered on Nouméa, New Caledonia) when Vandegrift was to return to Washington, D.C. to become the 18th Commandant of the Marine Corps. In this capacity, he continued with the planning for the assault on Bougainville until his death three weeks later. According to official accounts, he was accidentally injured following a cerebral hemorrhage and died on 8 October 1943 at the base hospital. General Barrett was buried in the American cemetery in New Caledonia. Following the war, he was reinterred in Arlington National Cemetery.

Barrett's death has always been somewhat shrouded in mystery, but there is evidence that his death was actually a suicide, committed the day after he was fired as IMAC CG by Admiral Halsey. The general fell out of the second floor window of his residence at Nouméa, and the inquest ruled the death accidental, related to a possible cerebral hemorrhage. However, the interior window sill was four feet above the floor, and a chair was found placed next to it which Barrett apparently used as a step to jump out the window. The sudden death of General Barrett resulted in Vandegrift's recall to the Pacific to resume command of IMAC.

== Decorations and awards ==
General Barrett's medals and decorations include:

Navy Distinguished Service Medal	Marine Corps Expeditionary Medal	Mexican Service Medal	World War I Victory Medal w/ Meuse-Argonne clasp
Army of Occupation of Germany Medal	American Defense Service Medal w/ Base clasp	Asiatic-Pacific Campaign Medal	World War II Victory Medal

=== Distinguished Service Medal citation ===
General Barrett was posthumously awarded the Distinguished Service Medal for his World War II service. His citation reads:

For exceptionally meritorious service to the Government of the United States in a duty of great responsibility as Assistant Commandant of the United States Marine Corps; Commanding General of the Third Marine Brigade; Commanding General of the Third Marine Division; and as Commanding General of the First Marine Amphibious Corps, prior to and during operations against enemy Japanese forces in the South Pacific Area, from 7 December 1941 to 8 October 1943. Assigned command of the Third Marine Brigade in March 1942, Major General Barrett welded this command into a superb fighting unit, advancing his forces to the shores of Western Samoa and organizing positions on Upolu and Savaili Islands. In conjunction with Naval Units stationed on the islands, he established important air and Naval facilities necessary to strengthen the chain of islands across the South Pacific and protect the vital line of communications to Australia. Returning to the United States in September 1942, to take command of the Third Marine Division, he developed a powerful striking force which was later to blast the enemy from his strongholds on Bougainville, Guam and Iwo Jima and thus pave the way for ultimate victory over the Japanese. Relieving the Commanding General of the First Marine Amphibious Corps on 15 September 1943, Major General Barrett, from his Headquarters on Noumea, New Caledonia, aided in formulating strategic plans for the assault on Bougainville which was to end enemy opposition to the important development of the Empress Augusta Bay Area as an Allied Airbase and to advance United States control nearer to the shores of the Japanese Homeland. Serving in this capacity until his death on 8 October 1943, Major General Barrett instilled in the officers and men under his command his own spirit of determination and, by his sharp military acumen, his forceful leadership and his indomitable courage, served as an inspiration to his gallant Marines in carrying the fight to the enemy. His conduct throughout reflects the highest credit on the United States Naval Service. He gallantly gave his life in the service of his country.

== Honors ==
- General Barrett is the namesake for the troop transport USNS Barrett

In Virginia, three locations are named after him:

- Charles Barrett Elementary School of Alexandria City Public Schools, Alexandria, Virginia.
- The Basic School, located in Quantico, Virginia, is located at Camp Barrett.
- Barrett Hall (Building 2042) is located on Marine Corps Base Quantico in Quantico, Virginia. Originally constructed for the Marine Corps Schools as an academic building, it now serves as administrative offices for the MAGTF Staff Training Program.
