= Holland Smith =

United States Marine Corps general

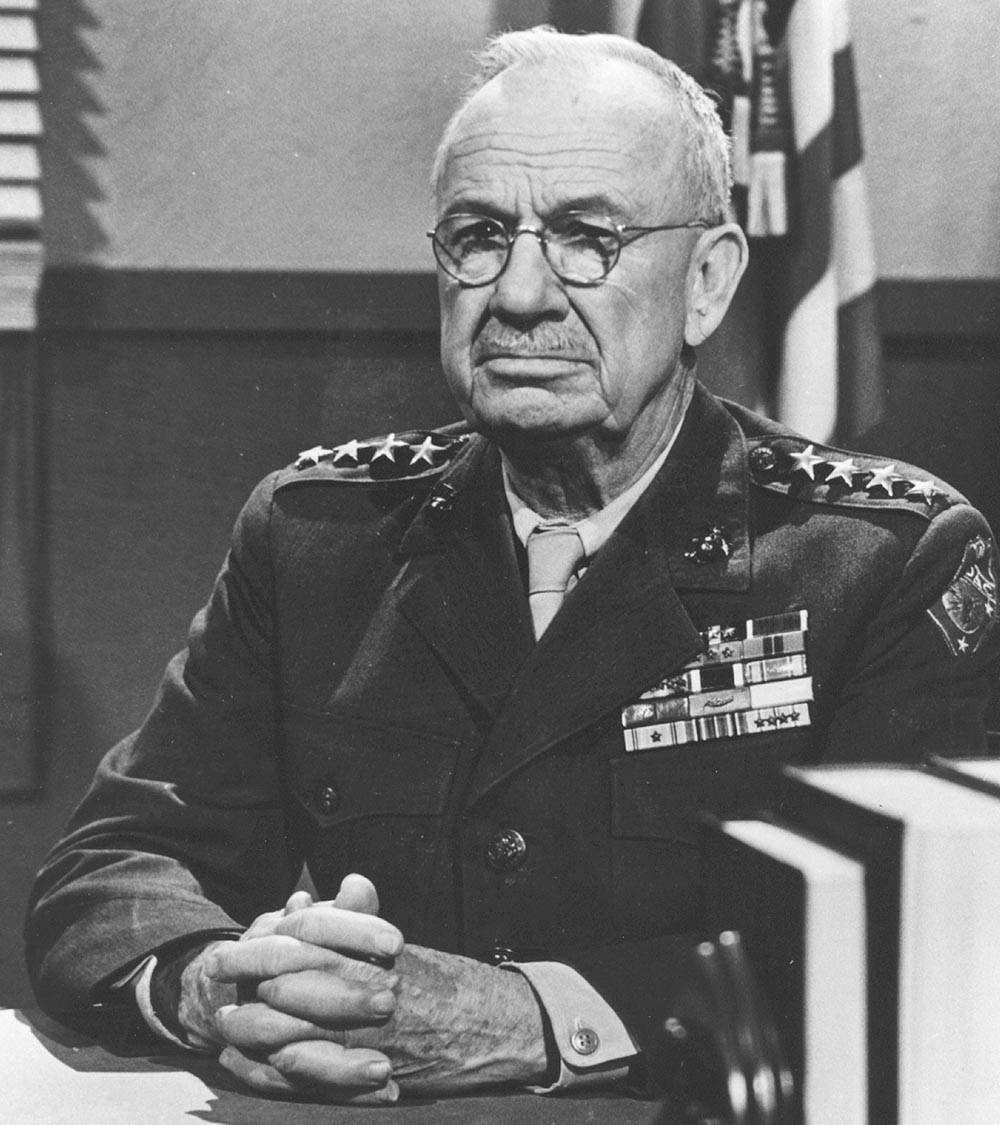
- General Holland M. Smith
- Born: Holland McTyeire Smith; April 20, 1882; Hatchechubbee, Alabama, U.S.
- Died: January 12, 1967 (aged 84); San Diego, California, U.S.
- Burial place: Fort Rosecrans National Cemetery
- Military career
- Allegiance: United States
- Branch: United States Marine Corps
- Service years: 1905–1946
- Rank: General
- Nicknames: "Howlin' Mad"; Father of Modern Amphibious Warfare
- Commands: Assistant to the Commandant; 1st Marine Brigade; 1st Marine Division; V Amphibious Corps
- Conflicts: Philippine–American War; Post-war insurgency; Banana Wars; Dominican Intervention; World War I; Battle of Belleau Wood; Hundred Days Offensive; Meuse-Argonne Offensive; World War II; Gilbert and Marshall Islands campaign; Battle of Tarawa; Battle of Kwajalein; Mariana and Palau Islands campaign; Battle of Saipan; Volcano and Ryukyu Islands campaign; Battle of Iwo Jima
- Awards: Navy Distinguished Service Medal (4); Purple Heart Medal; Croix de Guerre

Holland McTyeire "Howlin' Mad" Smith, KCB (April 20, 1882 – January 12, 1967) was a general in the United States Marine Corps during World War II. He is sometimes called the "father" of modern U.S. amphibious warfare. His nickname, "Howlin' Mad" Smith, had been given to him by his troops in the Dominican Republic in 1916.

On the eve of World War II, General Smith directed extensive Army, Navy, and Marine amphibious training, which was a major factor in successful U.S. landings in both the Atlantic and Pacific. He subsequently helped prepare U.S. Army and Canadian troops for the Kiska and Attu landings, then led the V Amphibious Corps in the assaults on the Gilbert Islands, the Marshall Islands, the island of Saipan, and Tinian in the Marianas.

During the Marianas operation, besides the V Amphibious Corps, he commanded all Expeditionary Troops, including those that recaptured Guam. He then served as the first commanding general of Fleet Marine Force, Pacific, and headed Task Force 56 (Expeditionary Troops) at Iwo Jima, which included all the assault troops in that battle.

== Early life ==
Holland Smith was born on April 20, 1882, in Hatchechubbee, Alabama, to John V. Smith and his wife Cornelia Caroline McTyeire, both strict Methodists. He received a Bachelor of Science degree from Auburn University (then known as Alabama Polytechnic Institute) in 1901. He had already decided on a military career and had become first sergeant of a cavalry company in the Alabama National Guard. However, he obtained his Bachelor of Laws degree from the University of Alabama in 1903 and practiced law in Montgomery, Alabama, for a year. He then sought a commission in the Regular Army, but as there were no vacancies, he decided on the U.S. Marine Corps and was appointed a second lieutenant on March 20, 1905. He was later awarded an honorary Doctor of Laws degree by Alabama Polytechnic Institute.

In April 1906, after completing the School of Application at Annapolis, Maryland, Smith sailed for the Philippines, where he served on expeditionary duty with the 1st Marine Brigade until September, 1908. He returned to the United States the following month and was stationed at the Marine Barracks, Annapolis, until December 1909, when he embarked for expeditionary duty in Panama. Returning from Panama in April 1910, he served at Annapolis, Puget Sound, Washington, San Diego, California, and the Recruiting Station, Seattle, Washington, before sailing in September 1912, to rejoin the 1st Marine Brigade in the Philippines.

He remained with the 1st Brigade until April 1914, when he took command of the Marine Detachment aboard USS Galveston. He served in that capacity in Asiatic waters until July 1915. He returned to the United States the following month for duty at the Navy Yard, New Orleans, Louisiana. From there, he was ordered to the Dominican Republic in June 1916, as a member of the 4th Marine Regiment. During that unit's operations against native insurgents, he saw action in the march to Santiago and engagements at La Pena and Kilometer 29. Returning to the United States on May 30, 1917, he sailed for France and World War I just two weeks later as commander of the 8th Machine Gun Company, 5th Marines.

== World War I ==
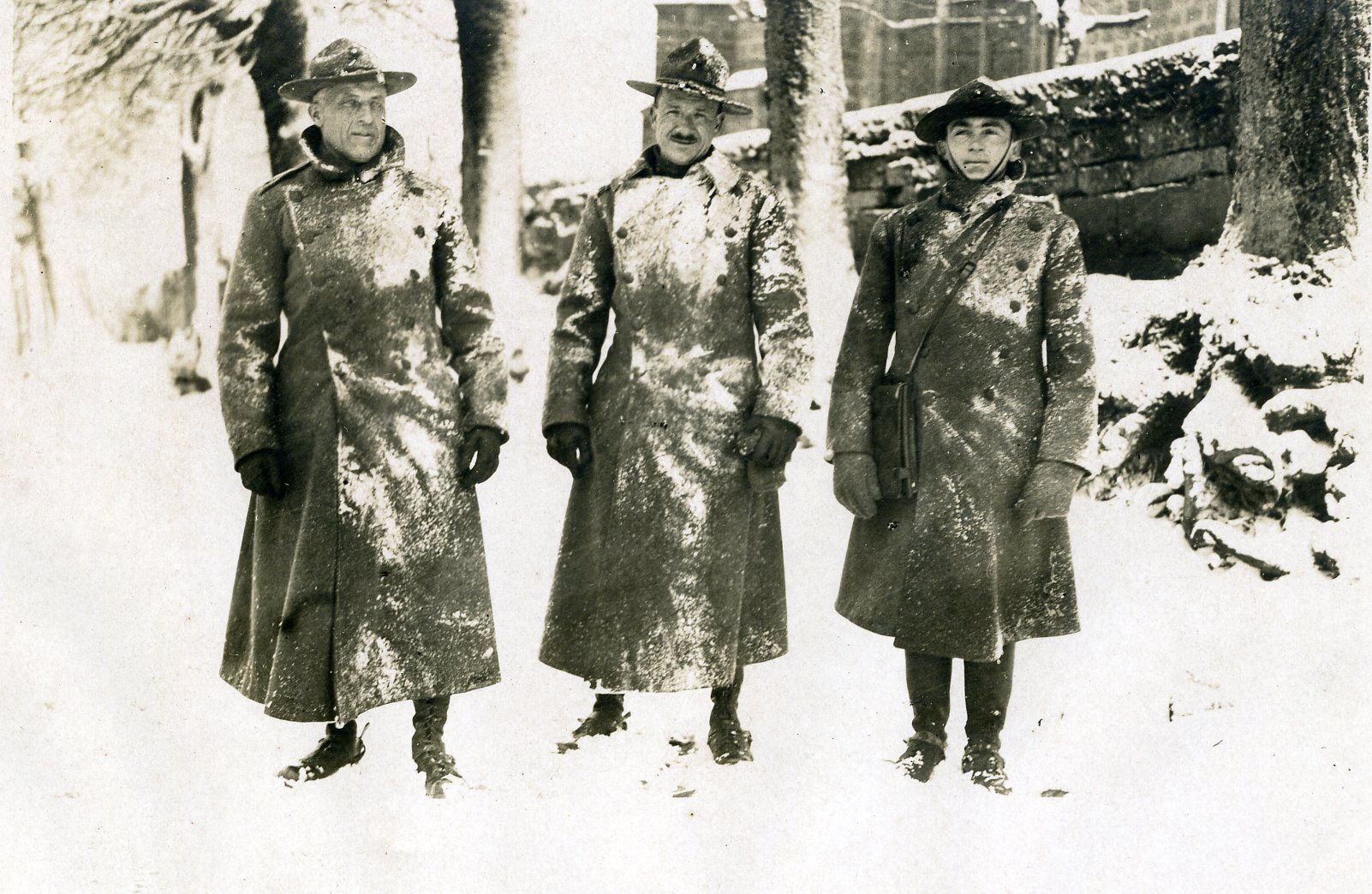
Brigadier General Charles A. Doyen (left), commanding the 4th Marine Brigade, and some members of his brigade staff, at Damblain, France, February 1918. To Doyen's left is Major Holland Smith, the brigade adjutant.

Smith's 8th Machine Gun company was assigned to the French Chasseurs Alpins to learn the tactics of the war from experienced French troops. After this time the 8th was assigned to a camp to offload arriving American vessels, where Smith became second in command of the camp.

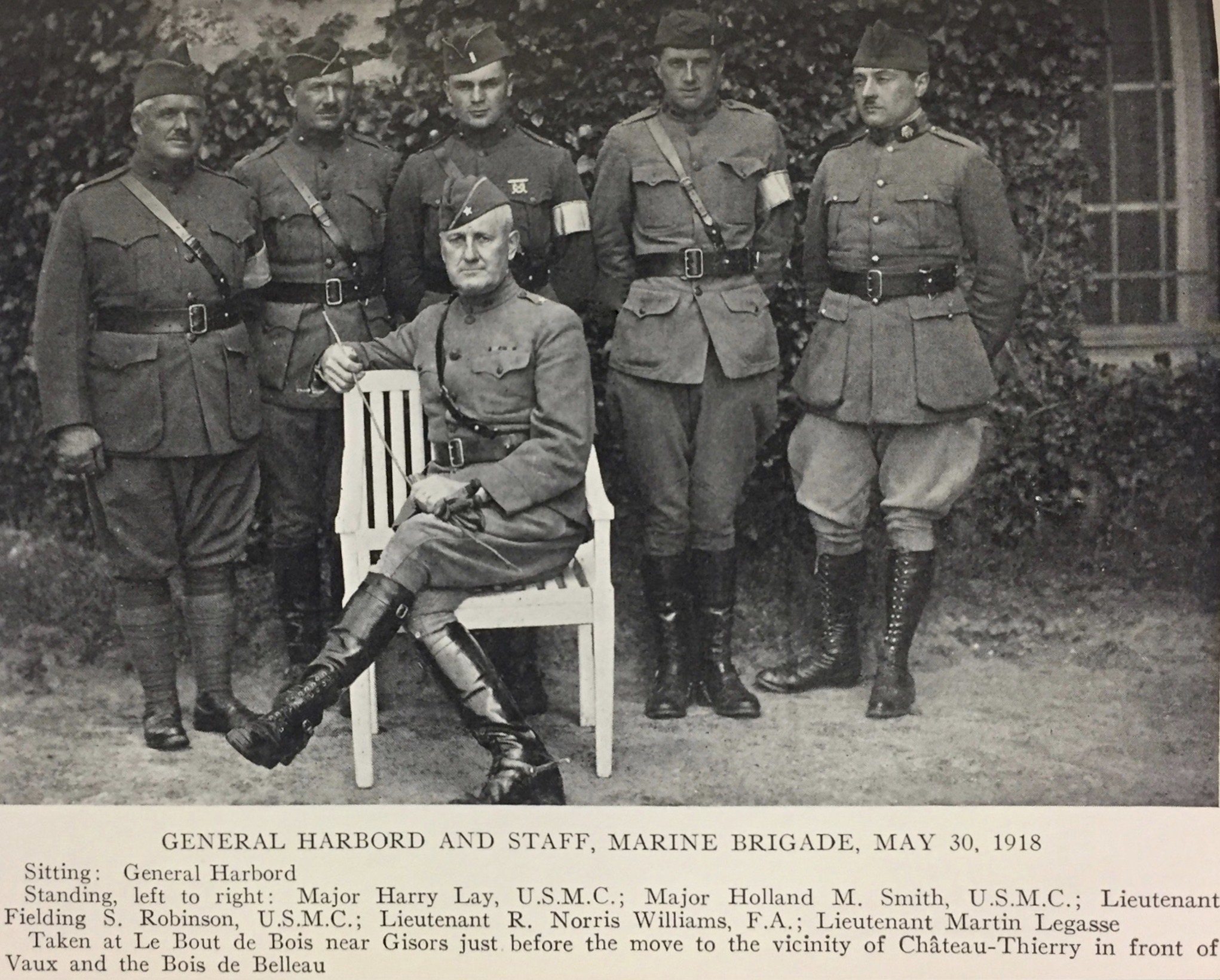
Brigadier General James Harbord, Doyen's successor as commander of the 4th Marine Brigade, and members of his brigade staff, including Smith, May 1918.

Smith was detached from the 5th Marines and sent to the Army General Staff College of the American Expeditionary Forces (AEF) at Langres, from which he graduated in February 1918. He was the first of only six Marines ever to complete this course. He was then named adjutant of the 4th Marine Brigade, which was a part of the U.S. Army's 2nd Division, serving in a relatively quiet sector, southeast of Verdun. During the fighting in and around Belleau Wood, he played "a vital though undramatic" role as brigade liaison officer, overseeing internal communications within the brigade. Transferred to the I Corps, First Army, in July 1918, he served as assistant operations officer in charge of liaison during the Aisne-Marne, Oisne-Aisne Offensive, St. Mihiel and Meuse–Argonne offensives. On 25 November 1918, two weeks after the Armistice with Germany, Smith was promoted to the temporary rank of major.

After the Armistice, he participated in the March to the Rhine through Belgium and Luxembourg as an assistant operations officer with the U.S. Third Army; during the occupation of the Rhineland, he served with the General Staff, U.S. Army.

For his service at Belleau Wood, Smith was awarded the Croix de Guerre with palm by the French government. He also received a Meritorious Service Citation from General John J. Pershing, commander-in-chief of the AEF, for which he was later awarded (in 1932) the Purple Heart, one of the first awarded for merit.

== Post-World War I ==
Smith returned to the United States in April 1919. His next four years included duty at Norfolk, Virginia; study at the Naval War College, Newport, Rhode Island; and service in Washington, D.C., with the War Plans Section of the Office of Naval Operations, where he was the first Marine officer to serve on the Joint Army-Navy Planning Committee. Leaving Washington in May 1923, he served aboard the battleships Wyoming and Arkansas as Fleet Marine Officer, U.S. Scouting Fleet, until September of that year.

In February 1924, after serving at Marine Corps Headquarters and in the West Indies in connection with joint Army-Navy maneuvers, Smith joined the Marine Brigade on expeditionary duty in Haiti, serving as that unit's chief of staff and officer in charge of operations and training. He returned in August 1925 to serve as chief of staff of the 1st Marine Brigade at Quantico, Virginia. From September 1926 to June 1927, he was a student in the Marine Corps School, Quantico, then served as post quartermaster of the Marine Barracks, Philadelphia Navy Yard, from July 1927 to March 1931.

In April 1931, Smith began another tour of sea duty, this time aboard the USS California as aide to the commander and Force Marine Officer of the Battle Force, U.S. Fleet. From June 1933 to January 1935, he commanded the Marine barracks at the Washington Navy Yard, then and served the following two years at San Francisco, California, as chief of staff, Department of the Pacific. He was ordered to Marine Corps Headquarters in March 1937 to serve two years as director of the Division of Operations and Training.

Smith served as assistant commandant of the Marine Corps under Major General Thomas Holcomb from April to September 1939, during which he was promoted to brigadier general.

== World War II ==
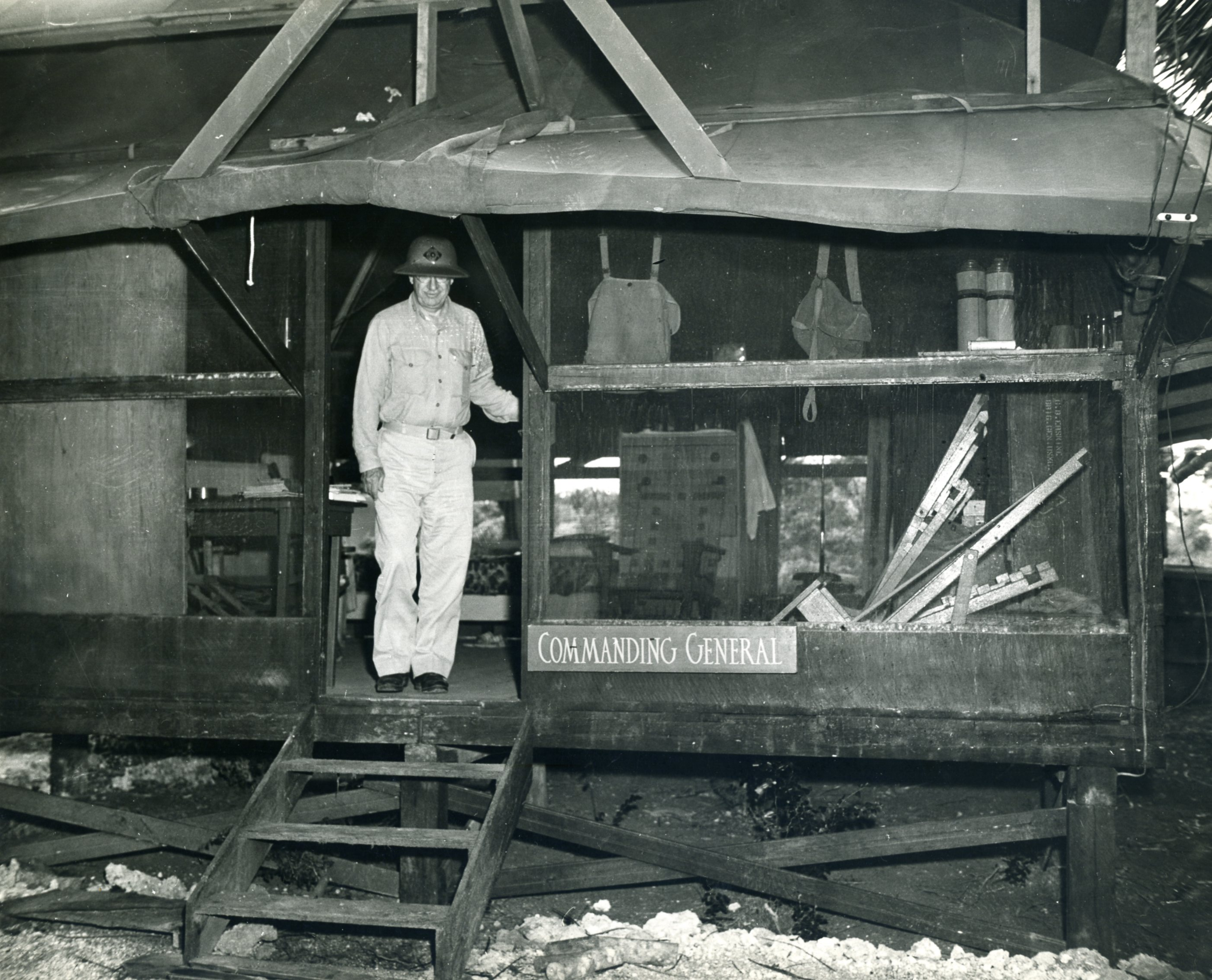
Smith in the "Commanding General's" tent in Guam, 1944

General Smith then assumed command of the 1st Marine Brigade at Quantico, taking that unit to Guantanamo Bay, Cuba, for extended amphibious training in October 1940. In February 1941, when the brigade was redesignated the U.S. 1st Marine Division, he became that organization's first commander. He returned with the division to Quantico in April 1941, and in June of that year he was detached from it to take command of the organization that eventually became the Amphibious Force, Atlantic Fleet. Under this command, the 1st Marine Division and the 1st and 9th Army Divisions received their initial training in amphibious warfare. Smith was promoted to major general in October 1941.

Moving to San Diego in August 1942, the general took command of the Amphibious Corps, Pacific Fleet, under which he completed the amphibious indoctrination of the 2d and 3d Marine Divisions before they went overseas, and the 7th Army Division and other units involved in the Aleutians operation. The Amphibious Corps, Pacific Fleet, was later redesignated the V Amphibious Corps, and in September 1943, as commander of that unit, Smith arrived at Pearl Harbor to begin planning for the Gilbert Islands campaign. Promoted to lieutenant general in February 1944, he continued to lead the V Amphibious Corps until August 1944, when he was named commanding general, Fleet Marine Force, Pacific, at Pearl Harbor. Subsequently, he commanded the Fleet Marine Force. In addition to that post, he commanded Task Force 56 in the Battle of Iwo Jima before returning to the United States in July 1945 to head the Marine Training and Replacement Command at Camp Pendleton, California. Holland was known for the quote "In our corps without responsibility and discipline we would not have won the Battle of Iwo Jima."

While planning for the 1945 assault on Okinawa, U.S. Navy Admirals Raymond Spruance and Richmond Turner wanted Smith to command the invasion forces. They were overruled by Admiral Chester Nimitz, commander in chief of Pacific Forces, because Smith had sacked a U.S. Army general, Ralph Smith, during the Saipan campaign, and justifiable animosity between senior U.S. Army staff existed towards Smith due to his service chauvinism. U.S. Army General Simon Bolivar Buckner, Jr. was appointed to command the Okinawa invasion, with Buckner being killed during the battle.

== Retirement ==
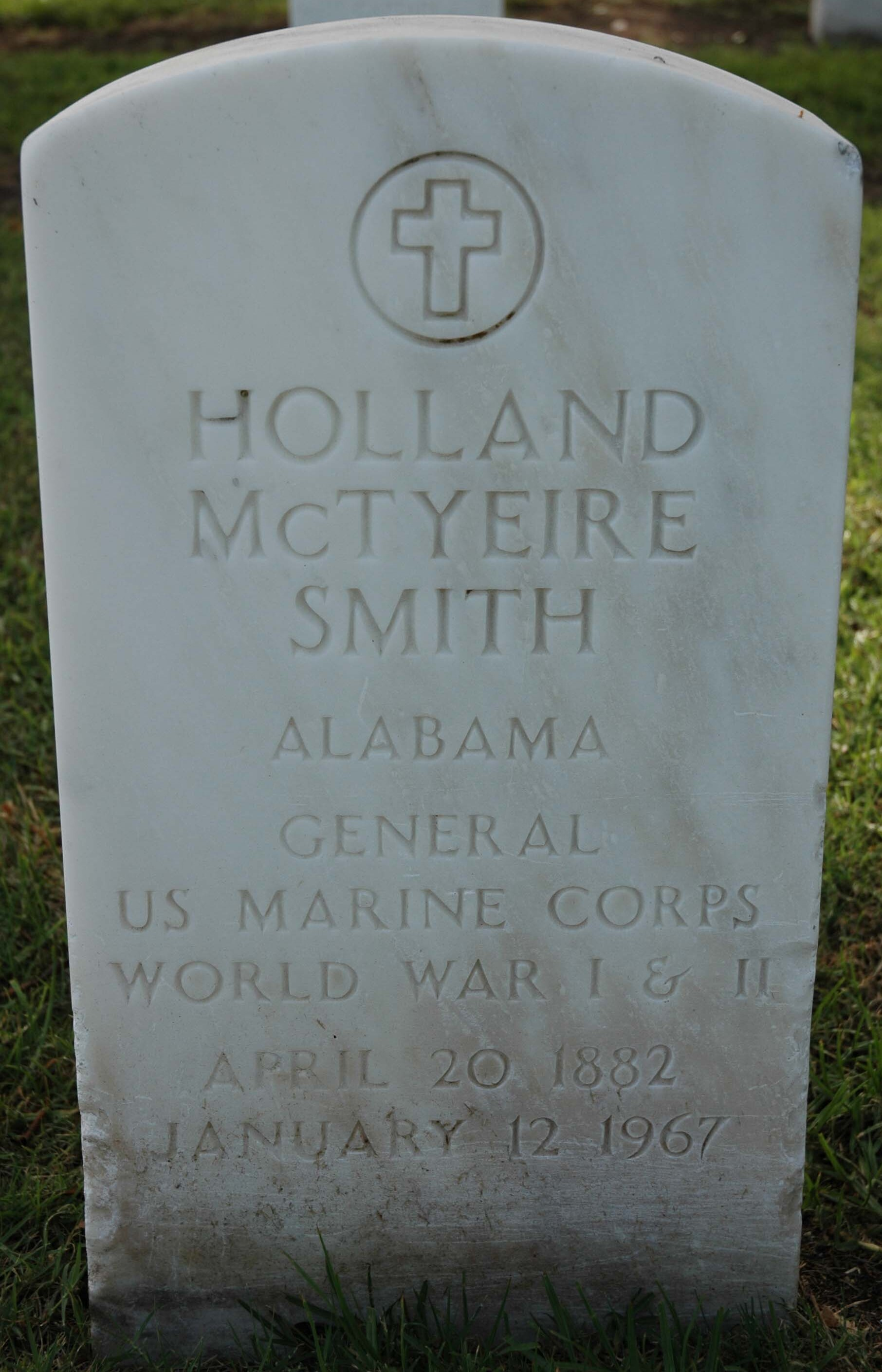
Smith's gravestone at Fort Rosecrans National Cemetery, San Diego

When Smith retired from the Marine Corps on May 15, 1946, he was promoted to general on the retired list for having been especially commended in combat. The 64-year-old took up residence in La Jolla, California, where he pursued his hobby, gardening.

Smith's wife, the former Ada B. Wilkinson, died in 1962. Following a long illness, Smith died on January 12, 1967, at the U.S. Naval Hospital in San Diego, California, aged 84. Funeral services were held on January 14 at the Marine Corps Recruit Depot Chapel. He was interred with full military honors in Fort Rosecrans National Cemetery overlooking San Diego harbor and North Island. Smith was survived by a son, Rear Admiral John V. Smith.

== Military awards ==
Smith was awarded the following military decorations and awards:

	Navy Distinguished Service Medal w/ three 5/16 inch gold stars	Purple Heart Medal
Marine Corps Expeditionary Medal w/ three 3/16 inch bronze stars	Mexican Service Medal	Dominican Campaign Medal
World War I Victory Medal w/ five campaign clasps	Army of Occupation of Germany Medal	American Defense Service Medal w/ "BASE" clasp
American Campaign Medal	Asiatic-Pacific Campaign Medal w/ five 3/16 bronze stars	World War II Victory Medal
Knight Commander of the Order of the Bath	Dominican Order of the First Merit	Croix de guerre (WWI) w/ palm

== Honors and recognitions ==
Camp H. M. Smith, located on Oahu, Hawaii, is a Marine Corps base named after Smith. It is home to the Pacific Command, Marine Forces Pacific and other commands.

There are two Marine Corps League Detachments in General Smith's name:

- Detachment #93 – Howlin Mad – Hobart, Indiana
- Detachment #592 – Howlin' Mad Smith – Birmingham, Alabama

In the film Flags of Our Fathers, General Smith is portrayed by actor Gordon Clapp.

In 1964, Smith received the Golden Plate Award of the American Academy of Achievement.

== See also ==
- List of 1st Marine Division commanders
- Battle of Tarawa
- Battle of Saipan

Military offices
New title	Commanding General of the 1st Marine Division; 1 February 1941 – 14 June 1941	Succeeded by Philip H. Torrey
New title	Commanding General of the V Amphibious Corps; 25 August 1943 – 11 July 1944	Succeeded by Harry Schmidt
New title	Commanding General of the Fleet Marine Force, Pacific; 17 September 1944 – July 1945	Succeeded by Roy Geiger
Preceded by Charles F. B. Price	Commander of the Marine Training and Replacement Command; October 1945 – March 1946	Succeeded by Harry Schmidt
