= Harry Schmidt (USMC) =

United States Marine Corps general

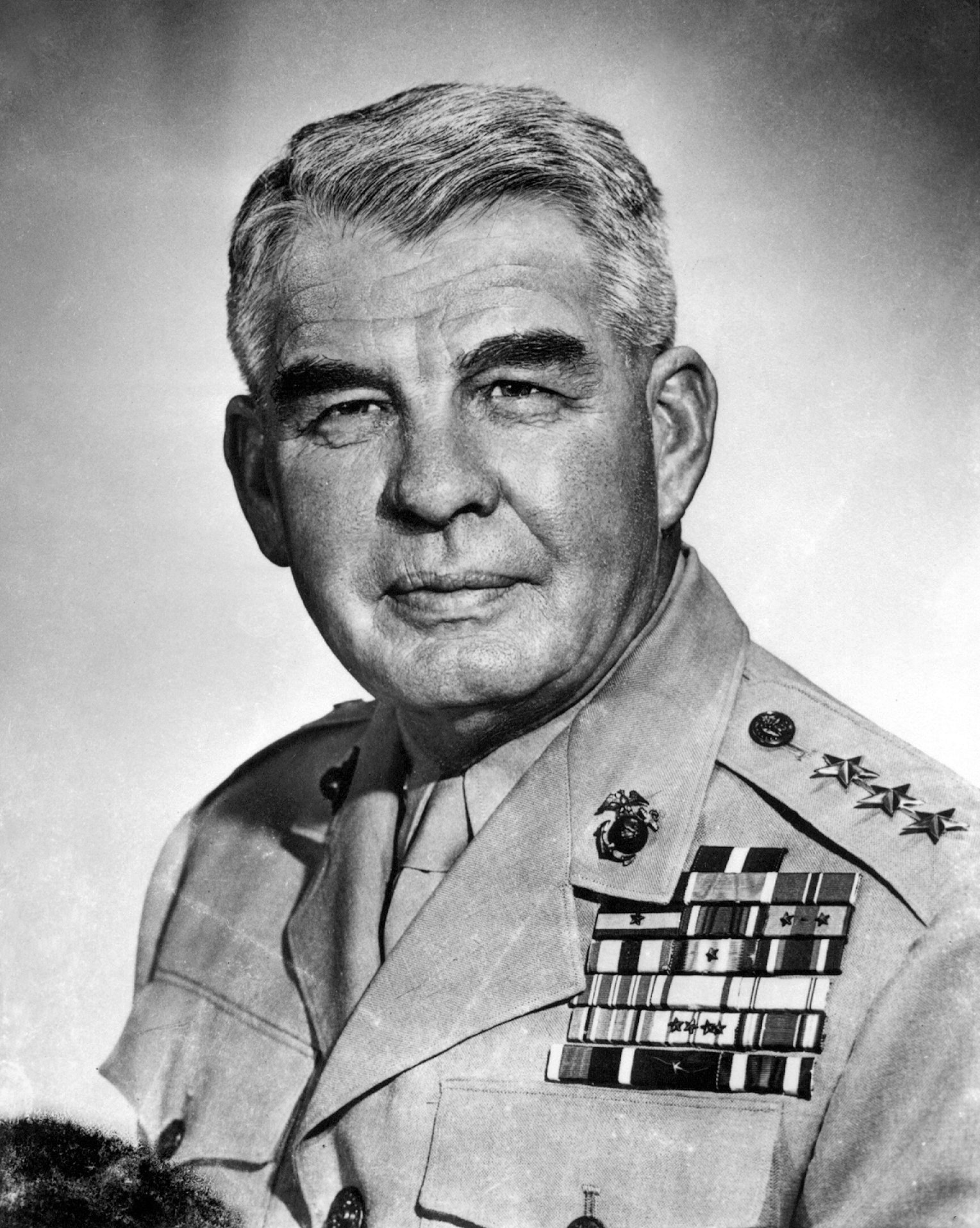
- Lieutenant General Harry Schmidt, USMC
- Born: September 25, 1886; Holdrege, Nebraska, U.S.
- Died: February 10, 1968 (aged 81)
- Burial place: Fort Rosecrans National Cemetery, San Diego, California, U.S.
- Military career
- Allegiance: United States of America
- Branch: United States Marine Corps
- Service years: 1909–1948
- Rank: General
- Nickname: The Dutchman
- Commands: 4th Marine Division; V Amphibious Corps
- Conflicts: Philippine–American War; Banana Wars; Occupation of Veracruz; Nicaragua intervention; World War I; World War II; Second Sino-Japanese War; Battle of Shanghai; Gilbert and Marshall Islands campaign; Battle of Kwajalein; Marianas campaign; Battle of Saipan; Battle of Tinian; Volcano and Ryukyu Islands campaign; Battle of Iwo Jima; Occupation of Japan
- Awards: Navy Cross; Navy Distinguished Service Medal (3); Legion of Merit (Army); Bronze Star Medal

Harry Schmidt (September 25, 1886 – February 10, 1968) was a United States Marine Corps general. During World War II, he served as the commanding general of the Fourth Marine Division during the battles of Kwajalein in the Marshall Islands and Saipan in the Mariana Islands, and as commanding general of the Fifth Amphibious Corps during the battles of Tinian in the Marianas and Iwo Jima in the Volcano Islands.

Schmidt retired from the Marine Corps at age 61 in 1948 with 39 years of service. A contemporary described Schmidt as "a Buddha, a typical old-time Marine: he had been in China; he was regulation Old Establishment; a regular Marine."

== U.S. Marine Corps career ==
Schmidt was born in Holdrege, Nebraska, on 25 September 1886. He attended Nebraska State Normal College for two years before accepting a commission as a second lieutenant in the 2nd Nebraska Infantry which he resigned from on 16 August 1909 in order to enter the U.S. Marine Corps as a second lieutenant on 17 August 1909.

Following instruction at the Marine Officers' School at Port Royal, South Carolina, he reported in January 1911, at the Marine Barracks, Guam, Mariana Islands. While attached to this station, he accompanied an expeditionary force to Chefoo, China. In October 1912, he was ordered to duty in the Philippines where he remained until detached to the United States in April 1913. Following an assignment with the Recruiting Service in Minnesota, a tour of duty at the Marine Barracks, New Orleans, Louisiana, and temporary duty at Veracruz aboard USS Kearsarge (BB-5) in 1915, he was ordered to sea duty aboard USS Oklahoma (BB-37) in May 1916 and was promoted to captain in August. In January 1917, he went aboard the USS Montana (ACR-13) and from 25 February to 22 March 1917, was ashore with the ship's landing force at Guantanamo, Cuba. Leaving the USS Montana in September 1918, he spent most of the next two years at the Marine Barracks, Norfolk, Virginia.

He again went to sea in June 1920, as commanding officer of the Marine Detachment aboard USS Tennessee (BB-43). From August 1922 (was promoted to major in January 1923) to May 1926, Schmidt was a member of the Marine Corps Schools at Quantico, Virginia, first as a student, then as an instructor. Then followed a year in recruiting at St. Paul, Minnesota, and a six-month tour of foreign service with the Sixth Regiment in China. From February 1928 to June 1929, Schmidt was with the Second Brigade of Marines in Nicaragua as brigade intelligence and operations officer.

He returned to the United States to attend the Command and General Staff School, Fort Leavenworth, Kansas, and graduated on 18 June 1932. In addition to Command and General Staff School, he is a graduate of the Field Officers' Course, Marine Corps Schools, MCB Quantico, Virginia. He was promoted to lieutenant colonel in May 1934. Following graduation, he was assigned to duty with the Paymaster Department and served variously at Headquarters, Marine Corps, Washington, D.C.; with the Department of the Pacific, San Francisco; the Fourth Marine Regiment, Shanghai, China; and again with the Department of the Pacific. In June 1937, he was assigned to the Second Marine Brigade. He sailed for Shanghai, China, in August with the brigade as chief of staff. In December 1937, he was promoted to colonel. He was detached to the United States in February 1938.

Schmidt was assigned to Headquarters, Marine Corps as executive and personnel officer of the Paymaster Department in July 1938, in which capacity he was found upon the country's entry into World War II.

=== World War II ===
In December 1941, Schmidt was promoted to brigadier general and in January 1942, he was appointed assistant to the commandant of the Marine Corps. In September, he was promoted to major general. On 18 August 1943, he became the commanding general of the Fourth Marine Division. He commanded the Fourth Division in the seizure of Roi-Namur in the Battle of Kwajalein and in the battle for Saipan.

On 12 July 1944, he assumed command of the Fifth Amphibious Corps and led that command in the assault and capture of Tinian Island. He was awarded a Distinguished Service Medal and a Gold Star in lieu of a second Distinguished Service Medal for exceptional meritorious service in the seizure and occupation of the Marshall Islands and in the assault and capture of Saipan and Tinian. Schmidt commanded the Fifth Amphibious Corps through the Iwo Jima operation and was awarded a second Gold Star in lieu of a third Distinguished Service Medal for his part in this operation. His citation reads in part, "Against determined enemy resistance and incomparable natural defenses, Major General Schmidt skillfully directed the attack of his troops to capture and occupy this strategic island. He handled the various units under his command with brilliant tactical skill. His sound judgment, distinctive administrative ability and unfailing devotion to duty were vital factors in the success of the entire operation." Following the conclusion of hostilities, he led the Fifth Amphibious Corps in the occupation of Japan.

=== Post-war ===
On 15 February 1946, he was ordered back to the United States to assume command of the Marine Training and Replacement Command, San Diego, California. In March 1946, he was promoted to lieutenant general. He retired from the Marine Corps with a tombstone promotion (an officer promotion based on having received a combat citation before 1947) to general on the retired list, on 1 July 1948.

== Death ==
Schmidt died on February 10, 1968, and was buried in Fort Rosecrans National Cemetery in San Diego.

== Military awards ==
Schmidt's military decorations and awards include:

1st Row	Navy Cross		Navy Distinguished Service Medal with two 5/16" gold stars	Legion of Merit (Awarded by the Army)
2nd Row	Bronze Star Medal	Navy Presidential Unit Citation with one 3/16" bronze star	Navy Unit Commendation	Marine Corps Expeditionary Medal with two 3/16" bronze stars
3rd Row	Mexican Service Medal	Yangtze Service Medal	World War I Victory Medal with Convoy clasps (one 3/16" bronze star)	Nicaraguan Campaign Medal (1933)
4th Row	China Service Medal	American Defense Service Medal	American Campaign Medal	Asiatic-Pacific Campaign Medal with four 3/16" bronze stars
5th Row	World War II Victory Medal	Navy Occupation Service Medal	Nicaraguan Medal of Merit with silver star	Nicaraguan Medal of Distinction with Diploma

=== Navy Cross citation ===
Citation:

The President of the United States of America takes pleasure in presenting the Navy Cross to Major Harry Schmidt (MCSN: 0-865), United States Marine Corps, for distinguished service in the line of his profession as Brigade Intelligence Officer, Second Brigade, U.S. Marine Corps, and in charge of civil relations between the Brigade and the Nicaraguan Government, from 5 February to 9 December 1928, and as Brigade Operations Officer from 10 December 1928 until 6 June 1929. during this entire time the Second Brigade operated in the Republic of Nicaragua for the purpose of protecting life and property and in restoring law and order to the strife-torn country. Despite great obstacles in the way of its successful accomplishment, Major Schmidt built up an effective intelligence service, the work of which was of the greatest value to the Brigade in the planning and execution of its operations. As operations officer his advice to the Brigade Commander as to military operations was marked by initiative, sound judgment and a thorough knowledge of tactics. His performance of duty as Civil Relations Officer was of a high order.

Military offices
Preceded by Formed	Commanding General of the 4th Marine Division; 18 August 1943 – 11 July 1944	Succeeded by Clifton B. Cates
Preceded by Holland Smith	Commanding General of the V Amphibious Corps; 12 July 1944 – 15 February 1946	Succeeded by Deactivated
