= Hand's Cove =

- U.S. National Register of Historic Places
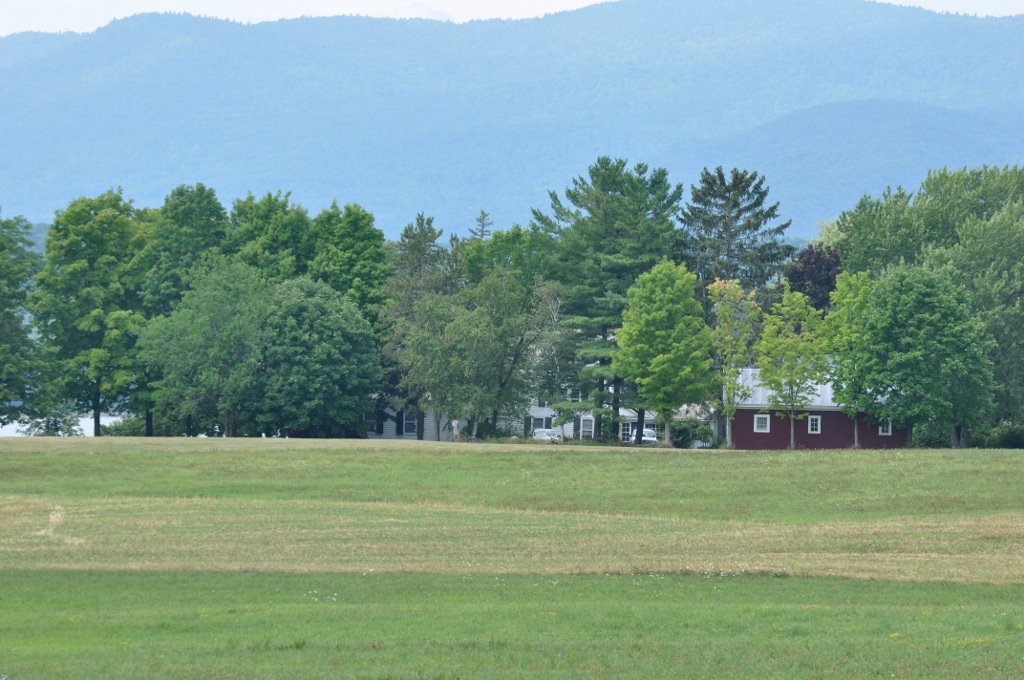

- Location within Vermont Location within the United States
- Location: Hand's Cove Rd., Shoreham, Vermont
- Coordinates: 43°52′2″N 73°21′56″W
- Area: 160 acres (65 ha)
- Built: 1775
- Architectural style: Greek Revival
- NRHP reference No.: 80000324
- Added to NRHP: May 22, 1980

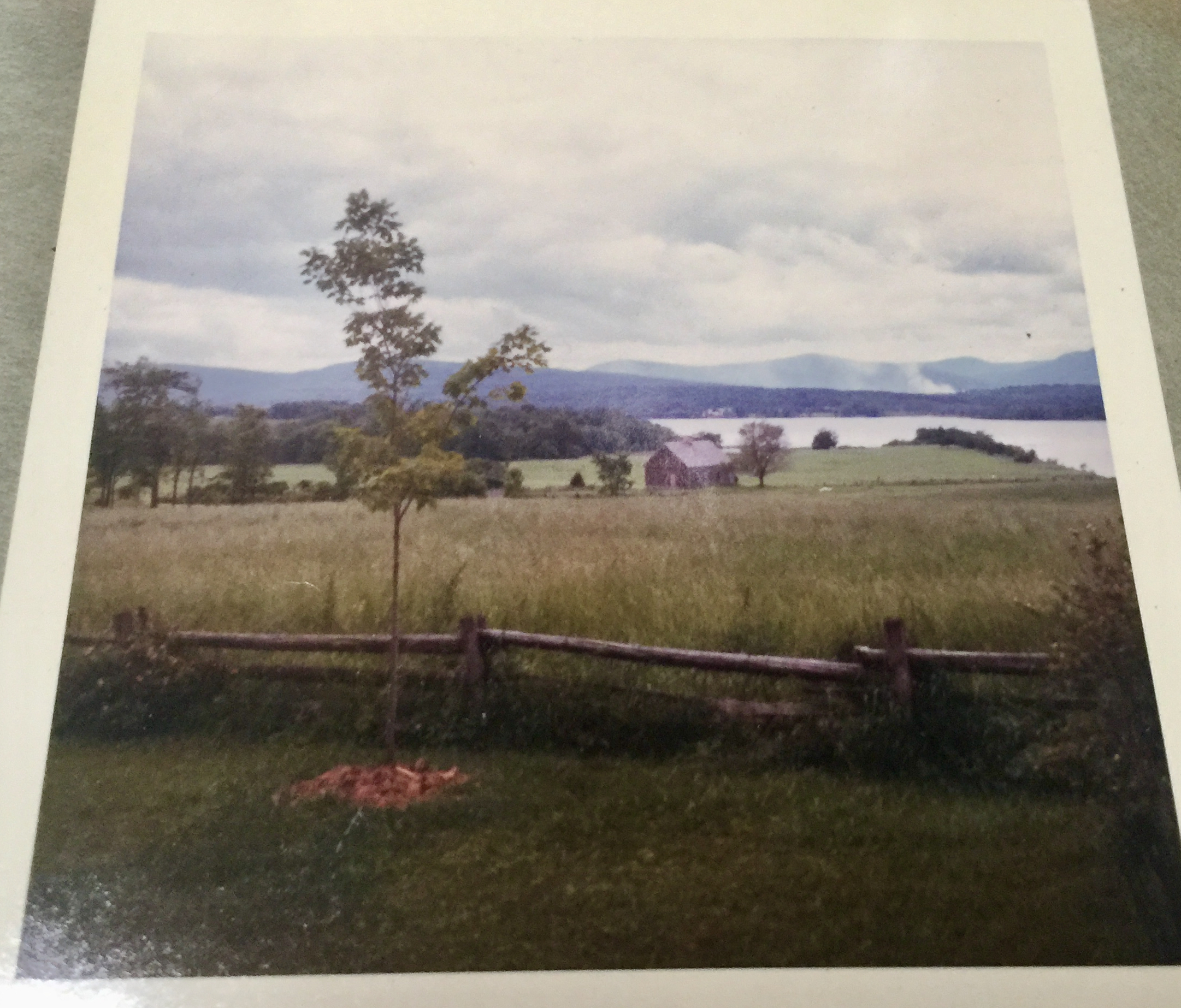
Hand's Cove, Summer 1964

Hand's Cove is a historically significant geographic feature on the eastern shore of Lake Champlain in Shoreham, Vermont. It was from this area that colonial forces led by Ethan Allen and Benedict Arnold crossed the lake for the Capture of Fort Ticonderoga, early in the American Revolutionary War. It is also home to the only known colonial-era blockhouse in the state. It was listed on the National Register of Historic Places in 1980.

== Description and history ==
Hand's Cove is an inlet on the east side of Lake Champlain, a short way north of Larrabee's Point in southwestern Shoreham. Immediately to its north is a shallow rise that projects to the west. The area's first documented settler was Joseph Earl, who owned the land at the time of the American Revolution. After the war it was acquired by Rufus Herrick, and was known for a time as Herrick's Cove. In 1793, Nathan Hand purchased the Herrick property, beginning three generations of ownership by the Hand family, which gave the area its present name. Hand's descendants include Augustus C. Hand and Augustus Noble Hand, noted lawyers and jurists.

There are two historically significant buildings on the former Hand property. One is a blockhouse of uncertain construction date, built in part out of heavy beams laid on top of one another, and joined at the corners by dovetail joints. It is set on a foundation that is of possibly greater age, and is built of stone similar to that found at Fort Ticonderoga. A building was documented as standing here at the time of the Allen/Arnold expedition in 1775, but it is unclear if it was this structure, because virtually all structures in this area were reported as destroyed by British raids during the war. A recent property owner suggests that the blockhouse may originally have been located across the lake at Fort Ticonderoga, because its beams are dimensionally similar to those found in the fort.

The second building is a brick Greek Revival house, located a short way inland from the blockhouse. Now augmented by a number of additions and farm outbuildings, it was probably built by Nathan Hand's son Samuel, who succeeded his father in ownership of the property. Samuel was the jurist Billings Learned Hand's father.

== See also ==
- National Register of Historic Places listings in Addison County, Vermont
