= Julius Spear Turrill =

American Brigadier General

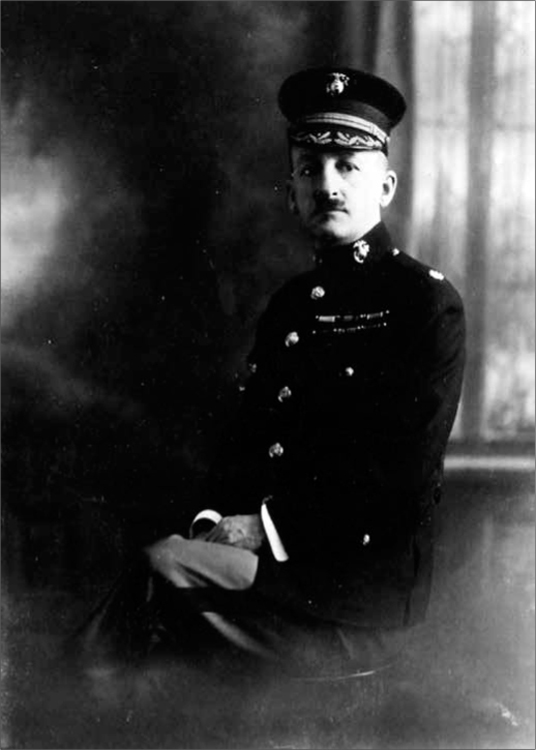
- Julius Spear Turrill
- Born: 1876; United States
- Died: 1943 (aged 66–67); United States
- Military career
- Allegiance: United States
- Branch: United States Marine Corps United States Army (Republic of Haiti (1859–1957)) Gendarmerie of Haiti
- Service years: 1899–1932
- Rank: Colonel (USMC): Brigadier general (USMC retired list); Lieutenant colonel (US Army); Major general (Haitian Gendarmerie)
- Commands: Portsmouth Naval Prison (1910): Co. D, 1st Prov. Reg, 1st Prov. Bde., Guantanamo, Cuba; Marine Barracks, Quantico (1917); 1/5 Marines (1917 & 1918); Commandant, Haitian Gendarmerie (1925–1927); United States Marine Corps Reserve (1929–1932)
- Known for: Attack on Hill 142 (Battle of Belleau Wood)
- Wars: Philippine–American War: 1912 Negro Rebellion in Cuba; Mexican Revolution; World War I
- Awards: Distinguished Service Cross; Navy Cross

Julius Spear Turrill (1876–1943) was an American Marine who served in World War One.

== Biography ==
Turrill was born on 17 June 1876, in Shelburne, Vermont to Clayton Royal Turrill and Alice E. Spear.

He married Mary Louise English on 3 July 1913, in Chicago.

He died on 19 September 1943, in Shelburne at the age of 67, and was buried in Shoreham, Vermont.

== Career ==
In his youth, he worked on a farm.

=== Military career ===
He was stationed at Cavite in the Philippines in 1903.

He participated in the Battle of Belleau Wood in 1918.

== Awards and honours ==
He received the Navy Cross for his service during the World War One.

He also received the Distinguished Service Cross in 1919. His award citation reads:

The President of the United States of America, authorized by Act of Congress, July 9, 1918, takes pleasure in presenting the Distinguished Service Cross to Lieutenant Colonel Julius Spear Turrill (MCSN: 0-1000), United States Marine Corps, for extraordinary heroism while serving with the Fifth Regiment (Marines), 2d Division, A.E.F., in action in the Bois-de-Belleau, France, 6 June 1918. Colonel Turrill displayed extraordinary heroism and set a splendid example in fearlessly leading his command under heavy fire against superior odds. Because of his bravery and initiative every possible advantage in the attack was obtained.

He also had at multiple Silver Star Citations, The Philippine Campaign Medal, China Relief Expedition Medal, Mexican Service Medal, WWI Victory Medal with five campaign stars, and Army of Occupation of Germany Medal. His foreign awards include the French Fourragère in the colors of the Croix de Guerre, Chevalier of the French Legion of Honour, French Croix de Guerre with Bronze star and two palms, and the Haitian National Order of Honour and Merit.
