= Ephraim Doolittle =

American state legislator (1834–1918)

- Born: October 29, 1725; Stafford, Connecticut
- Died: April 10, 1802 (aged 76); Shoreham, Vermont
- Spouse: Sarah Morton
- Military career
- Allegiance: United States
- Service years: 1775–1775
- Rank: Colonel
- Commands: 24th Continental Regiment
- Conflicts: American Revolutionary War

Ephraim Doolittle (1834 – February 28, 1918) was a dentist, minister, and state legislator in West Virginia.

He was born in Marion County, West Virginia. He served in the West Virginia Senate from the 2nd District in 1869 and 1870 in the Seventh and Eight West Virginia Legislature sessions. He was buried at the Doolittle Cemetery in Fairmont, West Virginia.
