= Desautels =

Desautels is a surname. Notable people with the surname include:

- Gene Desautels (1907-1994), American baseball player
- Guillaume Desautels (1529-1599), French poet
- L. Denis Desautels (born 1943), former Auditor General of Canada
- Michel Désautels (born 1951), Canadian writer and journalist
- Richard G. Desautels (1932-1951), United States Army soldier

== See also ==
- Janette Desautel, a fictional chef in the HBO television series Treme
