= Joanne Carson =

Joanne Carson may refer to:

- Joanne Carson (model), ex-wife of Johnny Carson
- JoAnne Carson, artist and painter
