= William Anderson (Vermont politician) =

American politician (1876–1959)

William John Anderson Jr.

Member of the Vermont House of Representatives
- In office 1945–1949

Personal details
- Born: February 14, 1876 Shoreham, Vermont, US
- Died: August 28, 1959 (aged 83) Burlington, Vermont, US
- Party: Republican
- Relations: Mary Annette Anderson
- Education: Mount Hermon School
- Occupation: Politician, farmer

William John Anderson Jr. (February 14, 1876 – August 28, 1959) was an American politician and farmer who served in the Vermont House of Representatives from 1945 to 1949. He was only the second African American to serve in the Vermont legislature after Alexander Twilight more than one hundred years earlier. His sister, Mary Annette Anderson, was the first Black woman to graduate from Middlebury College.

== Early life and career ==
Anderson was born to William John Anderson and Philomen Langlois in Shoreham, Vermont, on February 14, 1874. His father was an emancipated slave from Virginia who had accompanied Col. Charles Hunsdon of the 11th Vermont Infantry Regiment home to Vermont after the American Civil War. Philomen Langlois was a Vermonter of French-Canadian and Native American heritage. The couple became farmers in the small town of Shoreham, on the shore of Lake Champlain, where they were the only residents of color. They purchased their farm from Dr. William Hitchcock, who had employed 17-year-old Anderson Sr. in 1866.

Anderson attended school locally before attending Mount Hermon School for Boys in Massachusetts, where he earned his keep working in the school laundry starting in 1892. In 1897 or 1899, he was hired to work as a doorman at Hotel Champlain, summer residence of William McKinley. McKinley took an interest in the young man, asking him why he held so menial a position and thereby encouraging him to aspire to higher station in life. Returning to Mount Hermon, Anderson became manager of the school's laundry and held this position from 1900 to 1920, supervising generations of young student helpers, including Reader's Digest co-founder DeWitt Wallace. On May 19, 1902, Anderson married Lillian Jackson of Port Henry, New York. Their son, George William, was born at Mount Hermon on February 6, 1903.

While in Massachusetts Anderson became active in the Republican Party, serving as a delegate to the 1918 Republican state convention that nominated Calvin Coolidge for governor and subsequently attending Governor Coolidge's inauguration in 1919. He served in the US Army during World War I.

== Political and agricultural career ==
Anderson started the Diamond A Orchard on his parents' farm in 1911 and returned to Shoreham permanently in 1920. There he became a prosperous farmer who cultivated an orchard totaling 3,500 apple trees, mainly MacIntosh and Northern Spy cultivars, by the early 1930s. At its zenith in 1943, 40,000 bushels of apples were harvested from Anderson's orchard. He served as president of the Vermont Horticultural Society in 1935 and experimented with pomology in collaboration with Governor George Aiken. He spoke at Quebec Horticultural Society meetings in Montreal in 1939, 1941, 1942, 1943, and 1944, delivering his speeches first in English and then in French, a language he had learned from his mother. In addition to his farming, Anderson served as chaplain and secretary of the state Masonic society, whose lodges adopted a statewide policy of racial integration through a unanimous vote.

Anderson served in a number of elected town offices, serving as a Shoreman school board member in 1921–1923, town auditor in 1926, and town agent from 1937–1946. He was elected to represent Shoreham in the Vermont House of Representatives in 1945 and served two terms (1946–1949). He won his first election by a vote of 218 to 4 and his re-election by 92 to 1. He was the second African American to serve in the state legislature since Alexander Twilight's election in 1836. In Montpelier, the state capital, the Pavilion Hotel and the Tavern refused to lodge him on account of his race, so he lodged at Miller's Inn while the assembly was in session, befriending Middlebury College president John Martin Thomas and other legislators. The newspapers generally praised him, with a 1945 Burlington Free Press editorial calling him "typical of the state without regard to his race or the color of his skin."

Anderson corresponded and met with U.S. Senator Warren Austin, a fellow apple enthusiast to whom Anderson had provided cuttings from the Diamond A. Orchard, to combat racial discrimination in the military. Secretary of War Henry L. Stimson assured Senator Austin that "Mr. Anderson's suggestion has been given very careful study," pointing to the establishment of a ROTC program at Tuskegee University to increase the number of Black officers.

== Later life and family ==
Later in life, Anderson suffered from a struggling orchard business. He experienced depression and attempted suicide three times, once by an overdose of sleeping pills, once by drowning, and the third time by shooting himself, losing his sight as a result of the final attempt. He survived, and his mental health improved. Although blind, he learned to use a typewriter to write letters, mastered crafts such as belt-making, and continued to give speeches.

Anderson died from cancer in Burlington, Vermont, on August 28, 1959, at the age of 83. His funeral was held at the Congregational Church in town, and he was buried at Lake View Cemetery in Shoreham. His son, George William Anderson, and two grandchildren survived him.

His older sister, Mary Annette Anderson, was the first Black woman to graduate from Middlebury College, in 1899.
