= 3rd Brigade Combat Team, 1st Armored Division =

One of three basic maneuver units of the 1st Armored Division, US Army

3rd Brigade Combat Team of the 1st Armored Division
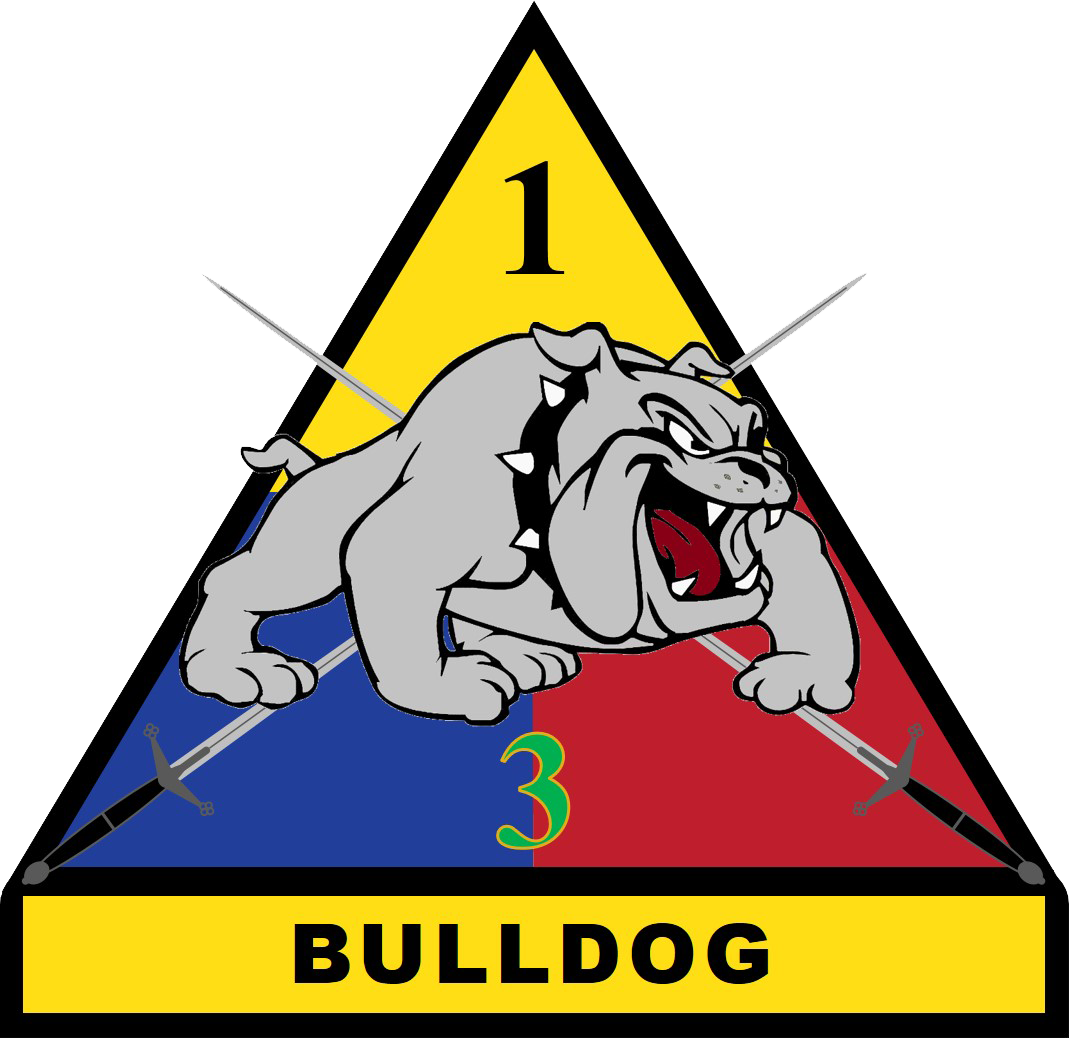
- Insignia of the 3rd Armored Brigade Combat Team, 1st Armored Division of the United States Army
- Country: USA
- Branch: Regular Army
- Type: Armored brigade combat team
- Part of: 1st Armored Division
- Garrison/HQ: Fort Bliss
- Nicknames: "El Paso's Own" (unofficial) "Bulldog" (official special designation)
- Engagements: World War I Operation Desert Storm; Operation Iraqi Freedom

The 3rd Brigade Combat Team, 1st Armored Division is an Armored Brigade Combat Team of the United States Army, stationed at Fort Bliss, TX. First organized in 1944, as Reserve Command, 1st Armored Division, the unit fought in Italy in World War 2, in Operation Desert Storm and in Operations Enduring and Iraqi Freedom. The brigade has been stationed at Forts Hood and Bliss, Texas; Fort Riley, Kansas; Fort Lewis, Washington; and in Germany.

George M. Morris is the current commander.

== History ==
=== Twenty-first century ===
On 15 April 2015, the 3rd BCT was reorganized as an Armored Brigade Combat Team by reflagging the units of the 4th Brigade Combat Team, which was inactivated.

== Current organization ==
3rd Brigade Combat Team, 1st Armored Division is currently organized as an Armored Brigade Combat Team, composed of the following units:

- Headquarters and Headquarters Company (HHC), 3rd Brigade Combat Team (3rd BCT)
- 2nd Squadron, 13th Cavalry Regiment
- 4th Battalion, 6th Infantry Regiment
- 1st Battalion 67th Armored Regiment
- 1st Battalion, 77th Armored Regiment
- 4th Battalion, 1st Field Artillery Regiment (4-1st FAR)
- 2nd Engineer Battalion
- 123rd Brigade Support Battalion (123rd BSB)

== Lineage and honors ==
=== Lineage ===
- Constituted 27 June 1944 in the Regular Army as Headquarters, Reserve Command, 1st Armored Division
- Activated 20 July 1944 in Italy
- Inactivated 25 April 1946 at Camp Kilmer, New Jersey
- Redesignated 27 February 1951 as Headquarters and Headquarters Company, Reserve Command, 1st Armored Division
- Activated 7 March 1951 at Fort Hood, Texas
- Reorganized and redesignated 26 June 1954 as Headquarters and Headquarters Company, Combat Command C, 1st Armored Division
- Inactivated 23 December 1957 at Fort Polk, Louisiana
- Redesignated 3 February 1962 as Headquarters and Headquarters Company, 3d Brigade, 1st Armored Division, and activated at Fort Hood, Texas
- Inactivated 15 April 1995 at Fort Lewis, Washington
- Activated 16 February 1996 at Fort Riley, Kansas
- Headquarters, 3d Brigade, 1st Armored Division, reorganized and redesignated 16 April 2007 as *Headquarters, 3d Brigade Combat Team, 1st Armored Division (Headquarters Company, 3d Brigade, 1st Armored Division – hereafter separate lineage)
- Inactivated 15 March 2008 at Fort Riley, Kansas
- Activated 16 August 2009 at Fort Bliss, Texas

=== Campaign participation credit ===
- World War II: Rome-Arno; North Apennines; Po Valley
- Southwest Asia: Defense of Saudi Arabia; Liberation and Defense of Kuwait; Cease-Fire
- War on Terrorism: Campaigns to be determined

=== Decorations ===
- Valorous Unit Award, Streamer embroidered IRAQ-KUWAIT 1991
- Valorous Unit Award, Streamer embroidered IRAQ 2003
