= 2nd Engineer Battalion =

US Army unit

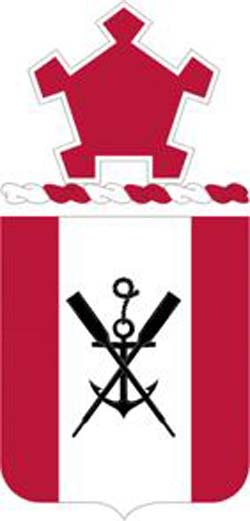
- Coat of Arms
- Active: 1861 - 2005; 2008 - Present
- Country: United States
- Branch: United States Army
- Type: Combat Engineer Battalion
- Size: Battalion
- Part of: United States Army Corps of Engineers, 3rd Brigade Combat Team, 1st Armored Division
- Garrison/HQ: Ft Bliss
- Mottos: Sapper Steel, Ardeur et Tenacite
- Engagements: World War 1; Battle of Belleau Wood; Korean War; Battle of the Ch'ongch'on River; Operation Paul Bunyan

Insignia
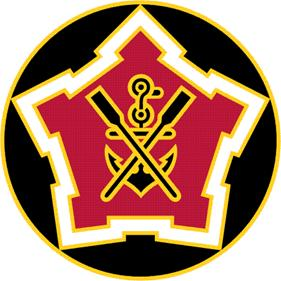
- Distinctive Unit Insignia

The 2nd Engineer Battalion is an engineer battalion in the United States Army which can trace its lineage back to 1861.

== Lineage ==
Organized 31 December 1861 in the Regular Army at Washington, D.C., from new and existing companies of engineers as a provisional engineer battalion (constituted 28 July 1866 as the Battalion of Engineers)

- Expanded 14 March-7 June 1901 to form the 1st and 2d Battalions of Engineers (1st Battalion of Engineers—hereafter separate lineage)
- 2d Battalion of Engineers expanded, reorganized, and redesignated 1 July-1 August 1916 as the 2d Regiment of Engineers
- 2d Regiment of Engineers expanded 21 May-20 June 1917 to form the 2d, 4th, and 5th Regiments of Engineers (4th and 5th Regiments of Engineers—hereafter separate lineages)
- 2d Regiment of Engineers redesignated 29 August 1917 as the 2d Engineers
- Assigned in September 1917 to the 2d Division (later redesignated as the 2nd Infantry Division (United States))
- 1st Battalion, 2d Engineers, reorganized and redesignated 16 October 1939 as the 2d Engineer Battalion (remainder of regiment disbanded)
- Redesignated 1 August 1942 as the 2d Engineer Combat Battalion
- Redesignated 1 March 1954 as the 2d Engineer Battalion
- Inactivated 15 June 2005 in Korea
- Headquarters and Headquarters Company activated 16 October 2008 at White Sands Missile Range, New Mexico (Support Company concurrently constituted and activated)
- Inactivated 30 April 2015 at White Sands Missile Range, New Mexico
- Activated 10 June 2015 at Fort Bliss, Texas as part of the 3rd Brigade Combat Team, 1st Armored Division.

== World War 1 ==
The 2nd Engineer Regiment was deployed to the Mexican border prior to US involvement in the First World War. On the US entry to the war the 2nd Engineers deployed to the Western Front in France as the organic Engineering element of the 2nd Division.

The regiment arrived in theater under strength. On 15 December 1917, 400 men from Companies D, E and F of the 116th Engineers (Idaho National Guard) assigned to the 41st "Sunset" Division. The remainder of the 116th Engineers formed the cadre of new military training depot in Angers, France.

The 1st and 2nd battalions of the 2nd Engineers participated in the Battle of Belleau Wood in direct support of the 4th Marine Brigade of the US Army's 2nd Division. Elements of the 2nd Engineers provided combat engineer support and fought as infantry throughout the battle. In the words of author and U.S. Marine Corps veteran John Thomason, "There were always good feelings between the Marines of the 2d Division and the Regular Army units that formed it, but the Marines and the 2d Engineers – 'Say, if I ever get a drink, a 2d Engineer can have half of it! Boy they dig trenches and mend roads all night, and they fight all day!'"

== Korean War ==
In late fall of 1950 Chinese forces surprised and overran U.S. and U.N. troops, including the U.S. Eighth Army and the 2nd Infantry Division. By the last week of November, U.S. and U.N. troops were forced to withdraw south. The 2nd Engineer Battalion was the organic combat engineer battalion assigned to the 2nd Infantry Division. The battalion was ordered to hold the town of Kunu-Ri protecting the rear and right flank of the Eighth Army as it retreated. Companies from the battalion were attached to two infantry regiments, the 9th and 38th, to fill gaps in the defending lines. The lines eventually gave way to brutal assaults by three Chinese divisions. By 26 November, after three days of heavy fighting, the three enemy divisions had grown to five, with more on the way. On 29 November, the battalion received orders to relocate south to Sunchon, but the Chinese had blocked the only escape route south at a mountain pass. The 2nd Engineer Battalion moved forward to clear a path through the obstacle and open the road. Once the road was cleared, the battalion was told to hold the line with the 23rd Infantry Regiment and A Battery of the 503rd Field Artillery. Early on 30 November, the massive 2nd Infantry Division convoy began to slowly make its way across the mountain pass through a six-mile gauntlet of Chinese sniper and mortar fire. Within hours the situation turned from bad to worse as swarms of Chinese troops engulfed the retreating column. The 2nd Engineer Battalion was the only unit left to oppose the massive Chinese assault. The engineers successfully held off the enemy long enough for the remainder of the 2nd Infantry Division to evacuate through the pass.

=== Burning of the colors ===
Unfortunately, by this time the engineers' window of opportunity to escape had closed. At 7:30 p.m. on 30 November, Col. Alarich Zacherle, battalion commander, ordered all equipment destroyed. Magnesium grenades were dropped on heavy equipment tracks and engines. Tires were filled with gasoline, thrown inside vehicles and set ablaze. Zacherle then ordered the battalion colors, its custom-made box, and the 25 combat streamers that adorned it soaked in gasoline and set on fire. He wanted to prevent the Chinese from capturing it as a war trophy. About 30 minutes after Zacherle gave that order, the Chinese forces overran the engineers. "Burning the colors and getting the hell out of there" were the only two things on their minds, but very few escaped. When the battalion regrouped after the battle, just 266 of the original 787 Soldiers remained. One officer was present; all others had been killed. Three hundred thirty-one members were captured and only 117 of them survived captivity. The Battalion was reconstituted after Kunu-ri and served gallantly through the remainder of the war.

=== Reenactment ===
Every year since the mid-1990s, the battalion has held a solemn nighttime ceremony where those actions are remembered and the unit's colors burned. During the re-enactment, a roll call is taken for the soldiers who endured the battle. Soldiers of the current 2nd Engineer Battalion answer by calling out the status of each, most often "Killed in action, sir." Retired Major Arden A. Rowley, one of many soldiers captured during the battle by the Chinese, answered for himself during the roll call of 22 November 2013.

== Campaign participation credit ==
Civil War: Peninsula; Antietam; Fredericksburg; Chancellorsville; Wilderness; Spotsylvania; Cold Harbor; Petersburg; Appomattox; Virginia 1863

Philippine Insurrection: Streamer without inscription

Mexican Expedition: Mexico 1916–1917

World War I: Aisne; Aisne-Marne; St. Mihiel; Meuse-Argonne; Lorraine 1918; Ile de France 1918

World War II: Normandy; Northern France; Rhineland; Ardennes-Alsace; Central Europe

Korean War: UN Defensive; UN Offensive; CCF Intervention; First UN Counteroffensive; CCF Spring Offensive; UN Summer-Fall Offensive; Second Korean Winter; Korea, Summer-Fall 1952; Third Korean Winter; Korea, Summer 1953

== Decorations ==
- Presidential Unit Citation (Army), Streamer embroidered WIRTZFELD-BULLINGEN
- Presidential Unit Citation (Army), Streamer embroidered HONGCHON
- French Croix de Guerre with Palm, World War I, Streamer embroidered AISNE-MARNE
- French Croix de Guerre with Palm, World War I, Streamer embroidered MEUSE-ARGONNE
- French Croix de Guerre, World War I, Fourragere
- Belgian Fourragere 1940
  - Cited in the Order of the Day of the Belgian Army for action in the Ardennes
  - Cited in the Order of the Day of the Belgian Army for action at Elsenborn Crest
- Republic of Korea Presidential Unit Citation, Streamer embroidered NAKTONG RIVER LINE
- Republic of Korea Presidential Unit Citation, Streamer embroidered KOREA 1950–1953

== See also ==
- Sgt Richard G. Desautels died a POW in China April 1953
