= Larrabee's Point Complex =

- U.S. National Register of Historic Places
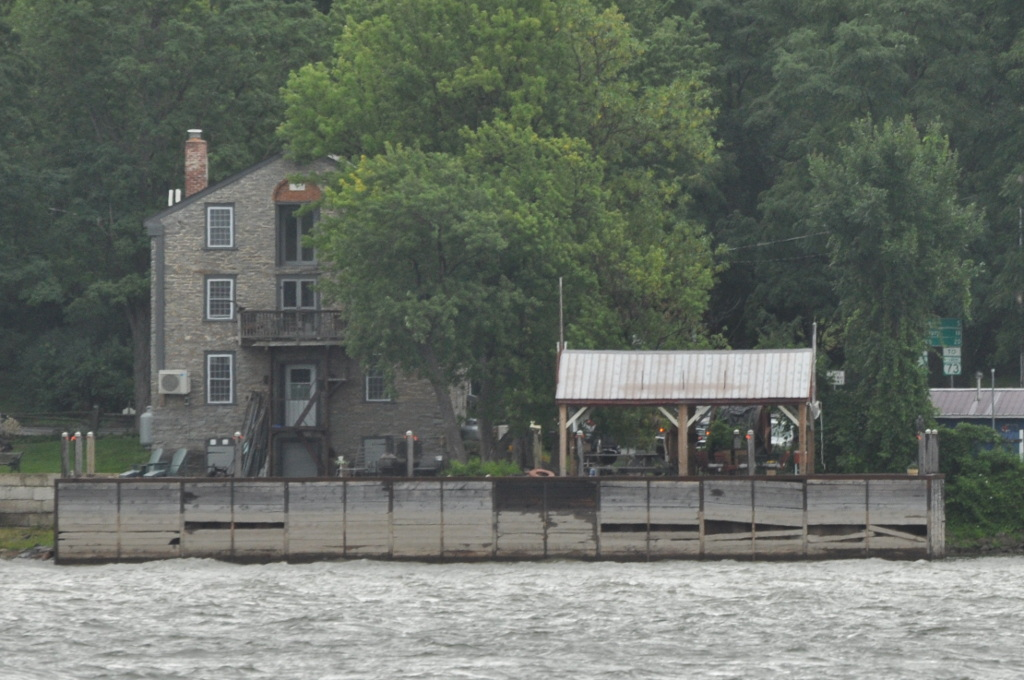
- The stone warehouse, as seen from across the lake

- Location within Vermont Location within the United States
- Location: Western terminus of Vermont Route 74, Shoreham, Vermont
- Coordinates: 43°51′20″N 73°22′36″W
- Area: 7 acres (2.8 ha)
- Built: 1823
- Architectural style: Greek Revival
- NRHP reference No.: 80000423
- Added to NRHP: May 1, 1980

The Larrabee's Point Complex consists of a collection of ferry-related buildings and structures at the western end of Vermont Route 74 in Shoreham, Vermont. Included are facilities currently used by the oldest operating ferry on Lake Champlain, the Ticonderoga-Larrabees Point Ferry, and two buildings historically associated with the ferry operation. The complex was listed on the National Register of Historic Places in 1980.

== Description and history ==
Larrabee's Point is located in southwestern Shoreham, on the eastern shore of Lake Champlain at a narrow point in the lake opposite Ticonderoga, New York. John Larrabee purchased the land in this area in 1787, and in 1799 received permission from the state to operate a ferry. By 1875, the Larrabee's Point complex included a large hotel and a wharf capable of docking large steamships that carried tourists on the lake. The ferry's importance in commercial freight transportation declined in the second half of the 19th century, due to the arrival of the railroads in Addison County. The stone warehouse standing adjacent to the current ferry slip, built in 1823, is a surviving reminder of this historic importance.

The historic elements of the Larrabee's Point complex include the ferry slip area, still in use by the modern ferry, and the adjacent stone wharf. The three-story stone warehouse, standing at the land side of the wharf, now houses a lake cruise ship service. Across Vermont 74 from the warehouse stands the c. 1835 house of John Larrabee, a brick 2 1/2-story structure. It is a particularly fine example of transitional Federal-Greek Revival architecture, with a later Victorian porch extending across the lake-facing front. The small wood-frame building housing the ferry office, between the ferry slip and the warehouse, is not historic.

== See also ==
- National Register of Historic Places listings in Addison County, Vermont
