= Battle of Belleau Wood =

World War I battle in 1918

- Part of the Western Front of World War I
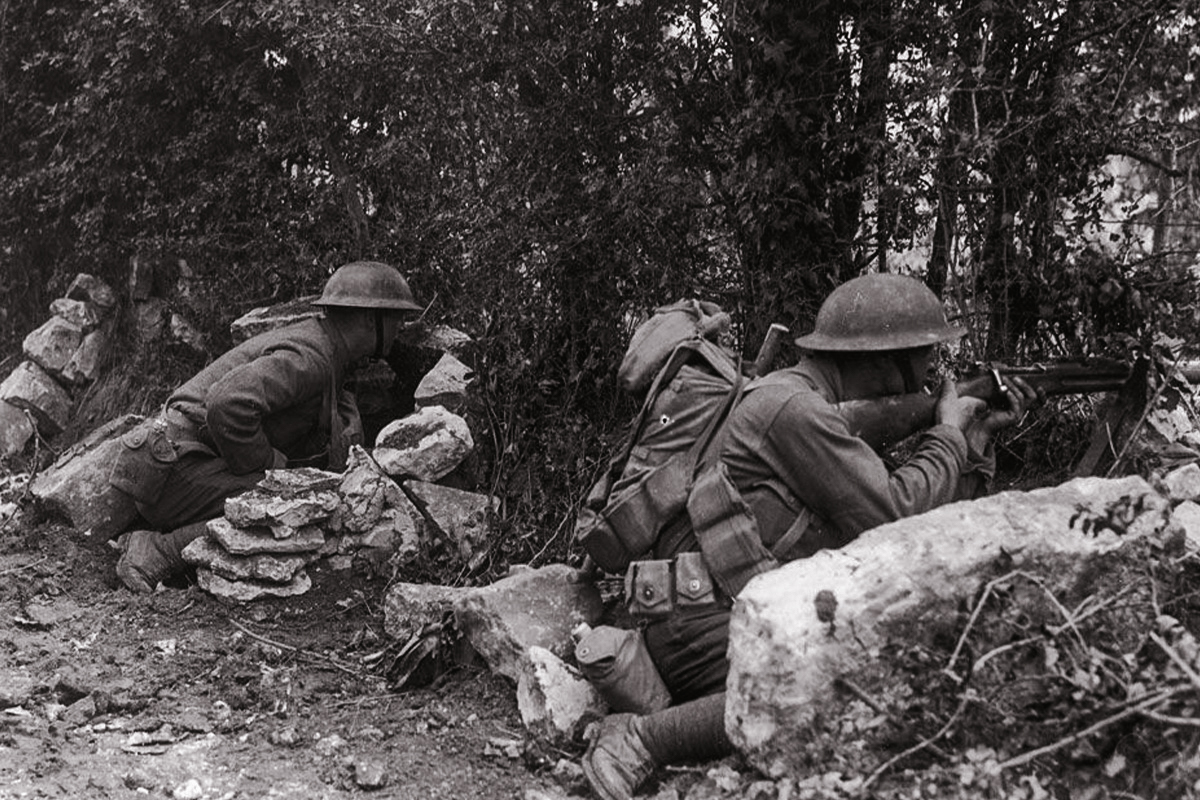
- U.S. Army Infantrymen, 2nd Infantry Division, Battle of Belleau Wood, June 1918
| Date | 1–26 June 1918 |
| Location | Belleau Wood near Marne River, France 49°4′24″N 3°17′27″E |
| Result | Allied victory |

Belligerents
| United States; France; United Kingdom | Germany |

Commanders and leaders
| John J. Pershing (French Third Republic) Jean Degoutte; James Harbord; Omar Bundy | Prince Wilhelm; Richard von Conta |

Strength
| 2 U.S. Army divisions (including 1 brigade of marines); French 6th Army (elements); British IX Corps (elements) | 5 German divisions (elements) |

Casualties and losses
| 9,777 | 10,000+ |

The Battle of Belleau Wood (1–26 June 1918) was a major battle that occurred during the German spring offensive in World War I, near the Marne River in France. The battle was fought by the U.S. 2nd (under the command of Major General Omar Bundy) and 3rd Divisions along with French and British forces against an assortment of German units including elements from the 237th, 10th, 197th, 87th, and 28th Divisions.

In United States Marines Corps lore dating back to the battle, the nickname Teufel Hunden ("Devil Dogs") originated. It was a phrase a German officer gave to the soldiers of the US Marines after their victory.

== Background ==
In March 1918, with nearly 50 additional divisions freed by the Russian surrender on the Eastern Front, the German Army launched a series of attacks on the Western Front, hoping to defeat the Allies before U.S. forces could be fully deployed. A third offensive launched in May against the French between Soissons and Reims, known as the Third Battle of the Aisne, saw the Germans reach the north bank of the Marne River at Château-Thierry, 95 kilometres (59 mi) from Paris, on 27 May. On 31 May, the 7th Machine Gun Battalion of the U.S. 3rd Division supported the Senegalese Tirailleurs in holding the German advance at Château-Thierry, in hard house-to-house fighting, and the German advance turned right towards Vaux and Belleau Wood.

On 1 June, Château-Thierry and Vaux fell, and German troops moved into Belleau Wood. Under General Jean Degoutte’s French 21st Corps, the U.S. 2nd Infantry Division—which included a brigade of U.S. marines—was brought up along the Paris-Metz highway. The 9th Infantry Regiment was placed between the highway and the Marne, while the 6th Marine Regiment was deployed to their left. The 5th Marine and 23rd Infantry regiments were placed in reserve. Just as German offensive came to an end, French general Jean Degoutte ordered American forces to take the Bois de Belleau, a small patch of forest near the southwestern extremity of the German salient.

== Battle ==
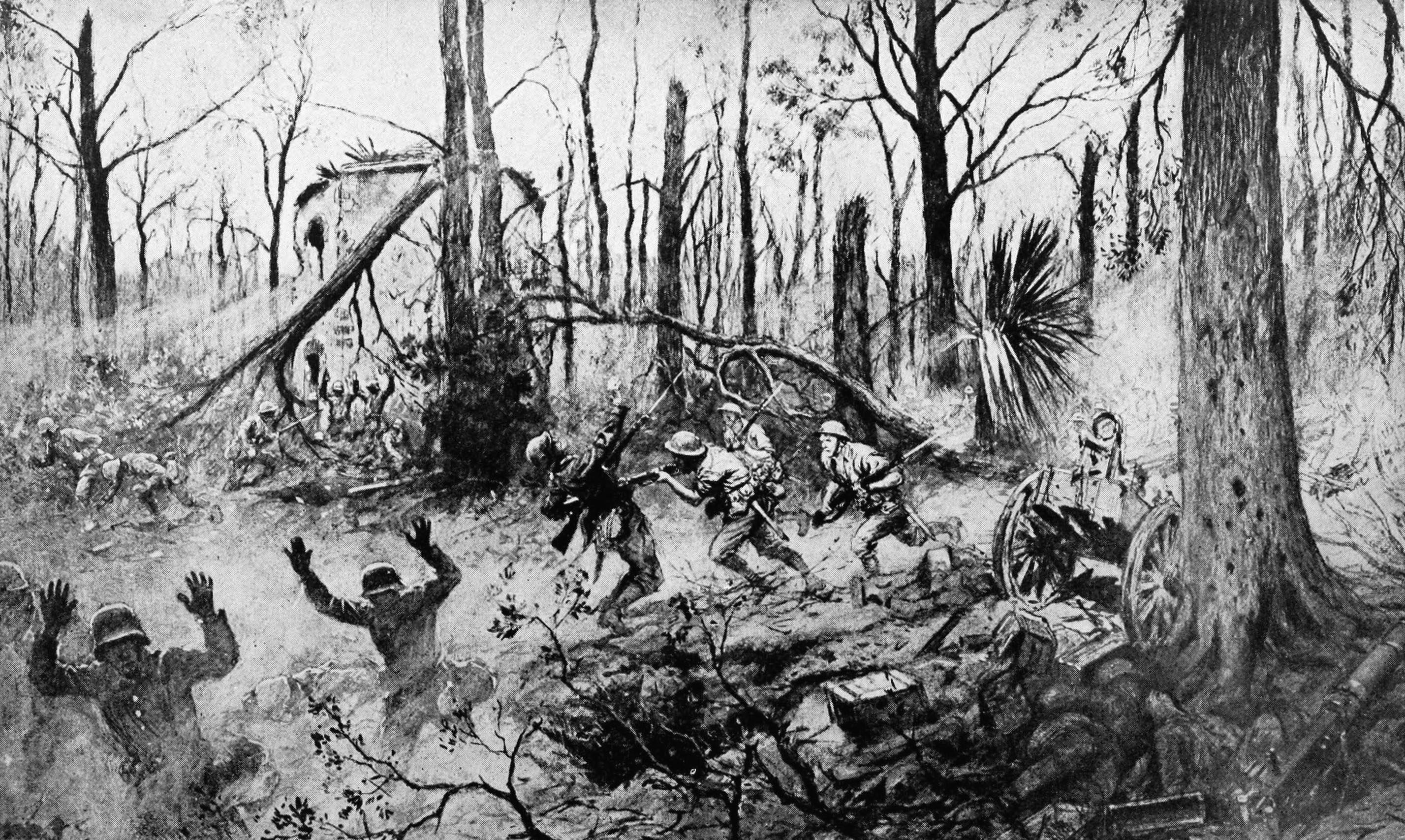
U.S. Marines in Belleau Wood (1918).

On the evening of 1 June, German forces punched a hole in the French lines to the left of the Marines' position. In response, the U.S. reserve—consisting of the 23rd Infantry Regiment under Colonel Paul B. Malone, the 1st Battalion, 5th Marines under Major Julius S. Turrill, and an element of the Marine 6th Machine Gun Battalion—conducted a forced march over 10 km (6.2 mi) to plug the gap in the line, which they achieved by dawn. By the night of 2 June, the U.S. forces held a 20 kilometres (12 mi) front line north of the Paris-Metz Highway running through grain fields and scattered woods, from Triangle Farm west to Lucy and then north to Hill 142. The German line opposite ran from Vaux to Bouresches to Belleau.

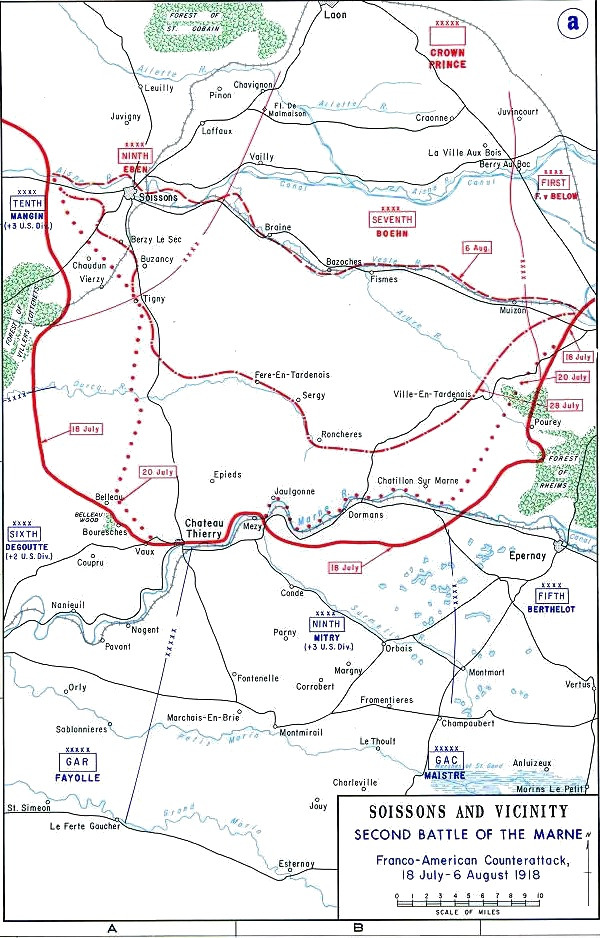
Map showing location of the battle of Belleau Wood (U.S. Military Academy)

=== German advance halted at Belleau Wood ===
German commanders ordered an advance on Marigny and Lucy through Belleau Wood as part of a major offensive, in which other German troops would cross the Marne River. The commander of the Marine Brigade, Army General James Harbord, countermanding a French order to dig trenches further to the rear, ordered the Marines to "hold where they stand". With bayonets, the Marines dug shallow fighting positions from which they could shoot from the prone position. In the afternoon of 3 June, German infantry attacked the Marine positions through the grain fields with bayonets fixed. The Marines waited until the Germans were within 100 yd (91 m) before opening deadly rifle fire which mowed down waves of German infantry and forced the survivors to retreat into the woods.

Having suffered heavy casualties, the Germans dug in along a defensive line from Hill 204, just east of Vaux, to Le Thiolet on the Paris-Metz Highway and northward through Belleau Wood to Torcy. Marine Captain Lloyd W. Williams of the 2nd Battalion, 5th Marines uttered the now-famous retort "Retreat, hell! We just got here." Williams' battalion commander, Major Frederic Wise, later claimed to have said the famous words.

On 4 June, Major General Bundy, commanding the 2nd Division, took command of the American sector of the front. Over the next two days, the Marines repelled the continuous German assaults. The 167th French Division arrived, giving Bundy a chance to consolidate his 2,000 yards (1,800 m) of front. Bundy's 3rd Brigade, led by General Edward Mann Lewis, held the southern sector of the line, while the Marine brigade held the north of the line from Triangle Farm.

=== Attack on Hill 142 ===
At 03:45 on 6 June, the Allies launched an attack on the German forces, who were preparing their own strike. The French 167th Division attacked to the left of the American line, while the Marines (with two Army battalions of the 2nd Engineers attached) attacked Hill 142 to prevent flanking fire against the French. As part of the second phase, the 2nd Division was to capture the ridge overlooking Torcy and Belleau Wood, as well as occupying Belleau Wood. However, the Marines failed to scout the woods. As a consequence, they missed a regiment of German infantry dug in, with a network of machine gun nests and artillery.

At dawn, 1st Battalion, 5th Marines, commanded by Major Julius S. Turrill, was to attack Hill 142, but only two companies were in position. The Marines advanced in waves with bayonets fixed across an open wheat field that was swept with German machine gun and artillery fire, and many Marines were cut down. Captain Crowther commanding the 67th Company was killed almost immediately. Captain Hamilton and the 49th Company fought from wood to wood, fighting the entrenched Germans and overrunning their objective by 6 yards (5.5 m). At this point, Hamilton had lost all five junior officers, while the 67th had only one commissioned officer alive. Hamilton reorganized the two companies, establishing strong points and a defensive line.

In the German counter-attack, Gunnery Sergeant Ernest A. Janson—who was serving under the name Charles Hoffman—repelled an advance of 12 German soldiers, killing two with his bayonet before the others fled; for this action he became the first Marine to receive the Medal of Honor in World War I. Also cited for advancing through enemy fire during the counter-attack was Marine Gunner Henry Hulbert who was awarded the Distinguished Service Cross.

2018 short film commissioned by the National Museum of the Marine Corps about the battle for its 100th anniversary.

The rest of the battalion now arrived and went into action. Turrill's flanks lay unprotected, and the Marines were rapidly exhausting their ammunition. By the afternoon, however, the Marines had captured Hill 142, at a cost of nine officers and most of the battalion's 325 men.

=== Marines attack Belleau Wood ===
On the night of 4 June, the intelligence officer for the 6th Marines, Lieutenant William A. Eddy, and two men stole through German lines to gather information about German forces. They gathered valuable information showing the Germans were consolidating machine gun positions and bringing in artillery. While this activity indicated an attack was not immediately likely, their increasing strength was creating a base of attack that raised concern about them breaking through to Paris.

At 17:00 on 6 June, the 3rd Battalion, 5th Marines (3/5), commanded by Major Benjamin S. Berry, and the 3rd Battalion 6th Marines (3/6), commanded by Major Berton W. Sibley on their right, advanced from the west into Belleau Wood as part of the second phase of the Allied offensive. Again, the Marines had to advance through a waist-high wheat field into machine gun fire. One of the most famous quotations in Marine Corps history came during the initial step-off for the battle when First Sergeant Dan Daly, a recipient of two Medals of Honor who had served in the Philippines, Santo Domingo, Haiti, Peking, and Vera Cruz, prompted his men of the 73rd Machine Gun Company forward with the words: "Come on, you sons of bitches. Do you want to live forever?"

The first waves of Marines, advancing in well-disciplined lines, were slaughtered; Major Berry was wounded in the forearm during the advance. On his right, the Marines of Major Sibley's 3/6 Battalion swept into the southern end of Belleau Wood and encountered heavy machine gun fire, sharpshooters, and barbed wire. Marines and German infantrymen were soon engaged in hand-to-hand fighting. The casualties sustained on this day were the highest in Marine Corps history up to that time. Some 31 officers and 1,056 men of the Marine brigade were casualties. However, the Marines now had a foothold in Belleau Wood.

=== Fighting in Belleau Wood ===
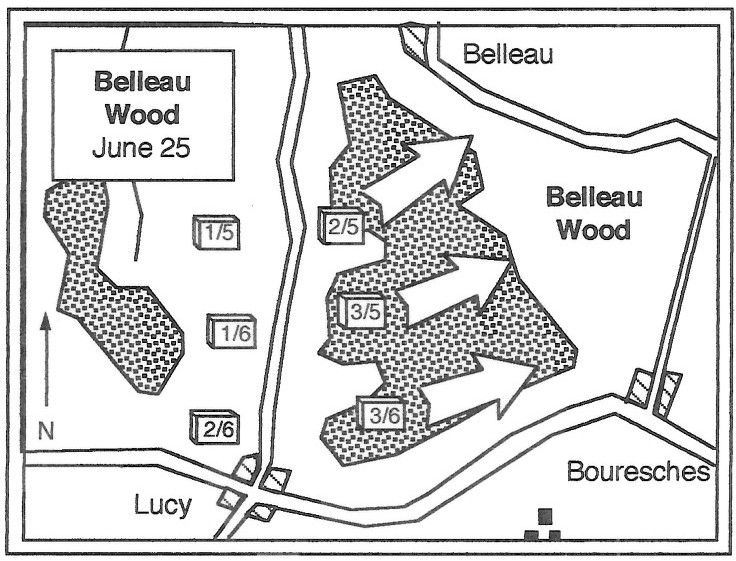
Map showing location of Marine push to secure Belleau Wood, 25 June 1918

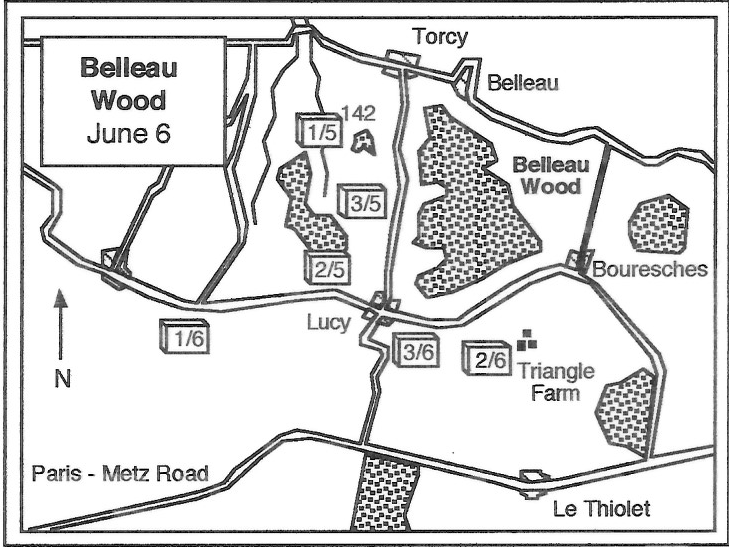
Location of U.S. Marine forces in Belleau Wood and surrounding areas, 6 June 1918.

The battle was now deadlocked. At midnight on 7–8 June, a German attack was stopped cold and an American counter-attack in the morning of 8 June was similarly defeated. Sibley's battalion, having sustained nearly 400 casualties, was relieved by the 1st Battalion, 6th Marines. Major Shearer took over the 3rd Battalion, 5th Marines from the wounded Berry. On 9 June, an enormous American and French barrage devastated Belleau Wood, turning the formerly attractive hunting preserve into a jungle of shattered trees. The Germans counter-fired into Lucy and Bouresches and reorganized their defenses inside Belleau Wood. 2nd Engineers (both battalions), continued to support the two Marine regiments in the wood, often fighting as infantry when the need arose. One Marine captain remarked after the war, "Boy, they dig trenches and mend roads all night, and they fight all day!"

In the morning of 10 June, Major Hughes' 1st Battalion, 6th Marines, together with elements of the 6th Machine Gun Battalion, attacked north into the wood. Although this attack initially seemed to be succeeding, it was also stopped by machine gun fire. The commander of the 6th Machine Gun Battalion, Major Cole, was mortally wounded. Captain Harlan Major, the senior captain present with the battalion took command. The Germans used great quantities of mustard gas. Next, Wise's 2nd Battalion, 5th Marines was ordered to attack the woods from the west, while Hughes continued his advance from the south.

At 04:00 on 11 June, Wise's men advanced through a thick morning mist towards Belleau Wood, supported by the 23rd and 77th companies of the 6th Machine Gun Battalion, and elements of the 2nd Battalion, 2nd Engineers and were cut to pieces by heavy fire. Platoons were isolated and destroyed by interlocked machine gun fire. It was discovered that the battalion had advanced in the wrong direction. Rather than moving northeast, they had moved directly across the wood's narrow waist. However, they smashed the German southern defensive lines. A German private, whose company had 30 men left out of 120, wrote "We have Americans opposite us who are terribly reckless fellows."

On 14 June, the U.S. Army's 23rd Infantry Regiment took over the eastern edge of the wood to allow the Marines to concentrate their forces farther north. On 15 June, after 10 days of heavy fighting, General Bundy convinced French General Denis Auguste Duchene, commanding general of the Sixth French Army, to attach the U.S. Army's 7th Infantry Regiment to his division so the Marine battalions could be withdrawn to rest, refit, and receive replacements. That night, the 7th U.S. Infantry began relieving battalions of the 5th Marines and 6th Marines in the northern part of Belleau Wood, extending to the remainder of the wood toward Bouresches over the next two days. The Army battalions continued to grind away at the German defenses over the next six days, with one unit pushing a kilometer to capture a crossroads south of Torcy-en-Valois. Beginning the night of 21 June, the Marines began to replace the 7th Infantry throughout Belleau Wood. A Marine private observed, "We went back to Belleau Wood and found the Seventh Infantry almost wiped out... but they were still fighting the best they could."

Overall, the woods were attacked by the Marines a total of six times before they could successfully expel the Germans. They fought off parts of five divisions of Germans, often reduced to using only their bayonets or fists in hand-to-hand combat.

On 26 June, the 3rd Battalion, 5th Marines, under command of Major Maurice E. Shearer, supported by two companies of the 4th Machine Gun Battalion and the 15th Company of the 6th Machine Gun Battalion, made an attack on Belleau Wood, which finally cleared that forest of Germans. On that day, Major Shearer submitted a report simply stating, "Woods now U.S. Marine Corps entirely", ending one of the bloodiest and most ferocious battles U.S. forces would fight in the war.

== Aftermath ==
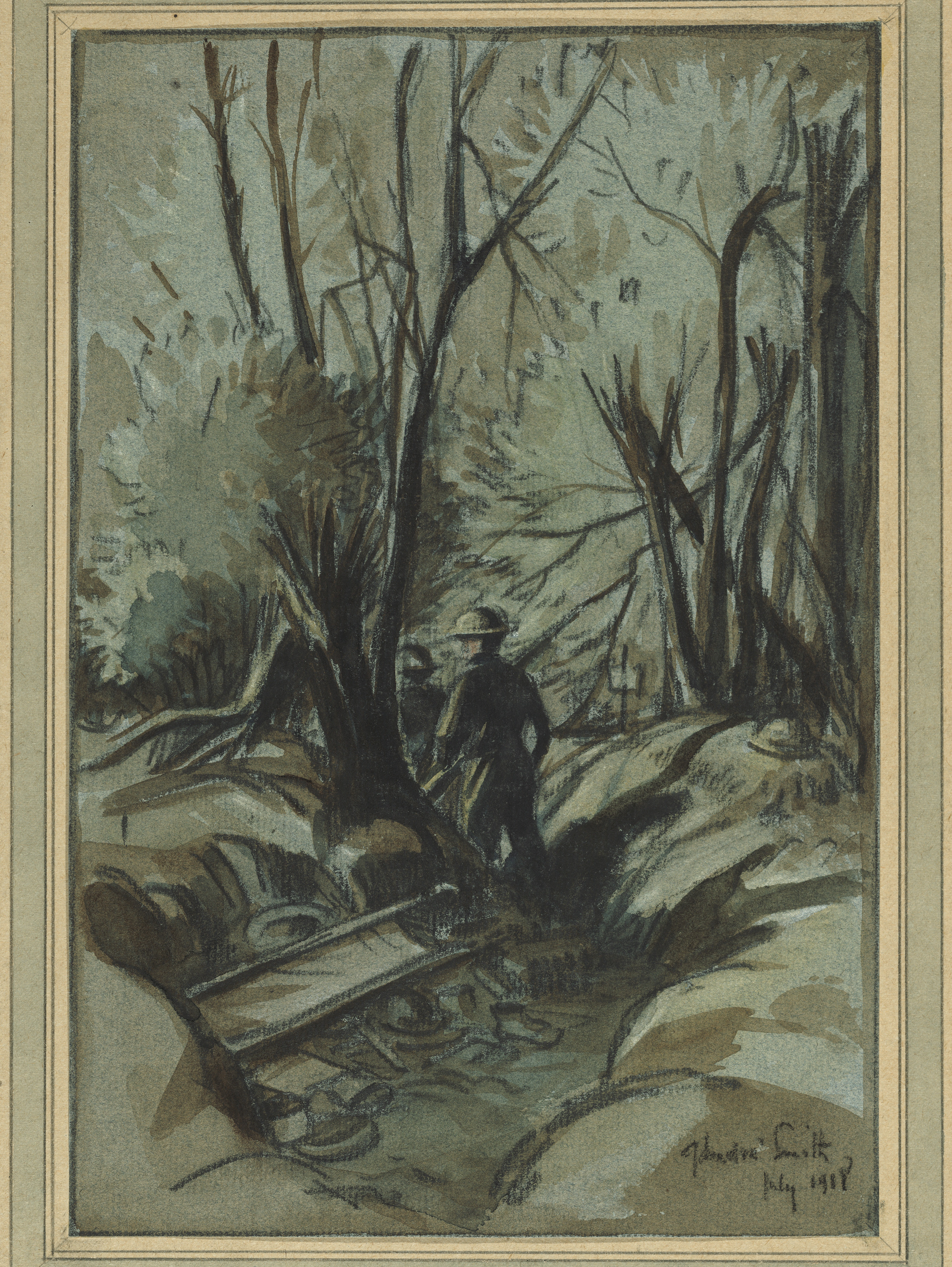
"The Trail to Belleau Wood" US Army Soldiers in Belleau Wood by Andre J. Smith, 1918

United States forces suffered 9,777 casualties, included 1,811 killed. Many are buried in the nearby Aisne-Marne American Cemetery. Less clear is the number of German casualties, estimated to be over 10,000, with 1,600 taken prisoner.

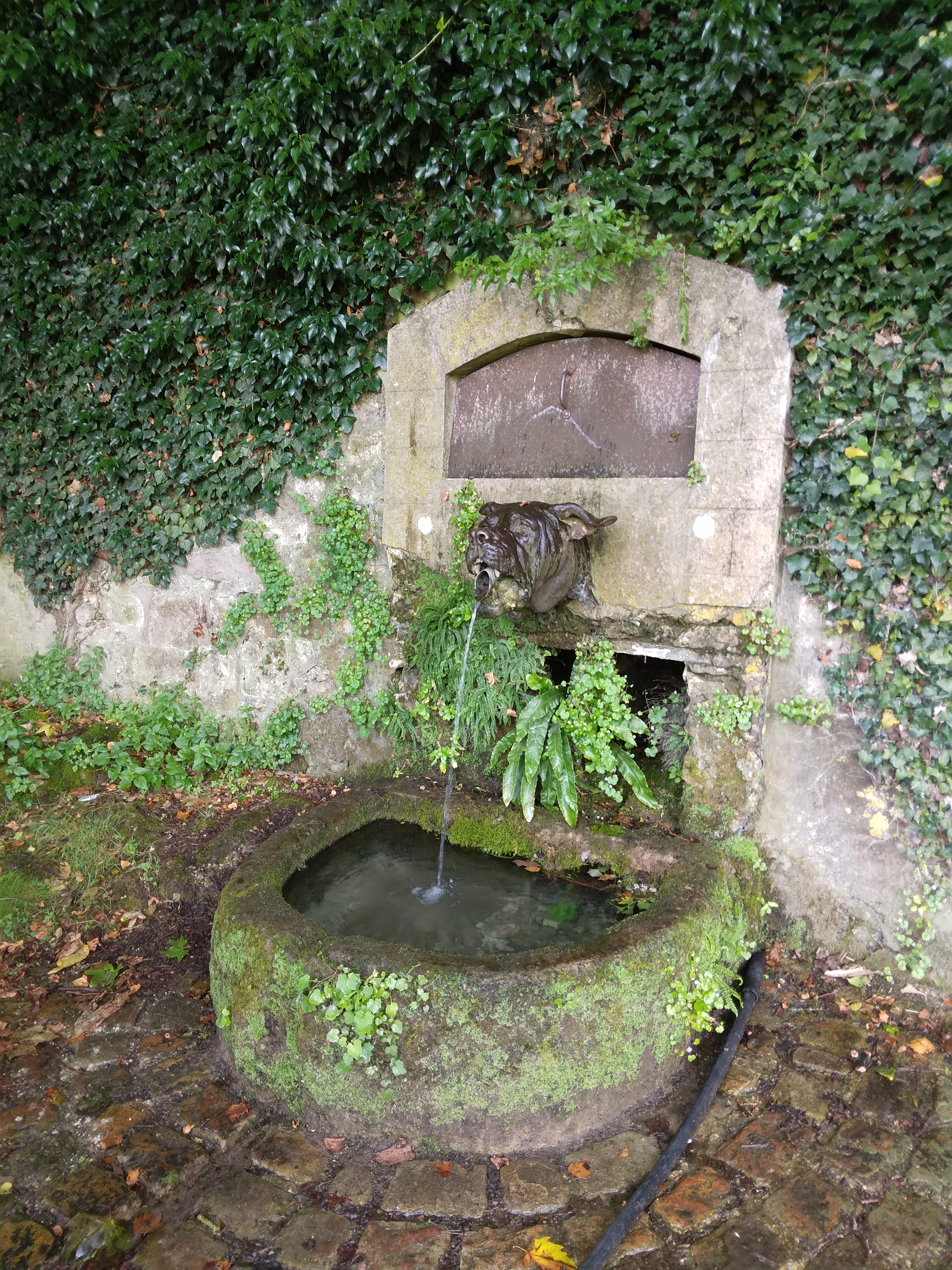
The Bulldog fountain

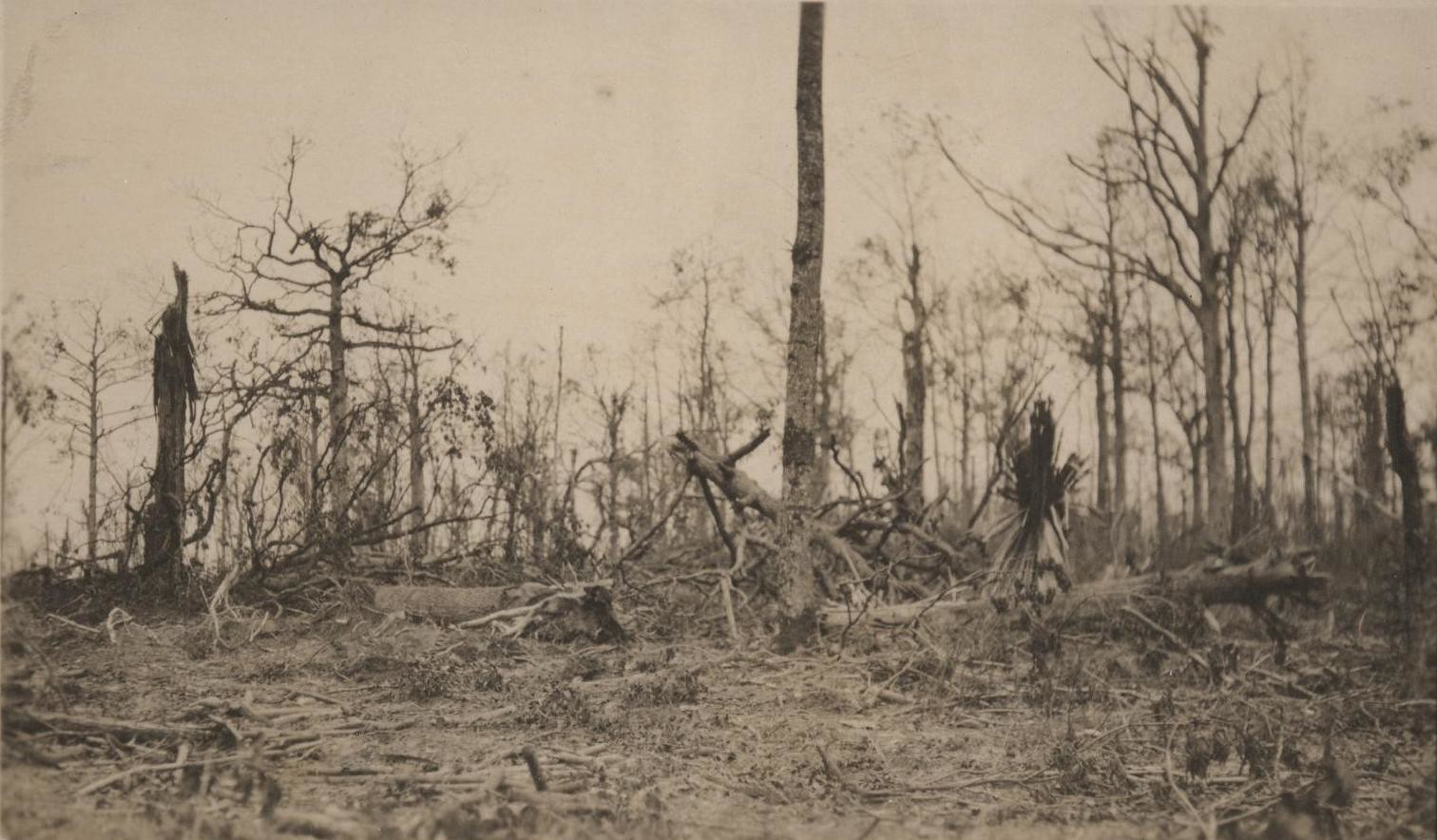
Shell-torn trees in Belleau Wood following the nearly month-long battle.

After the battle, the French renamed the wood Bois de la Brigade de Marine ('Wood of the Marine Brigade') in honor of the Marines' tenacity. The French government also later awarded the 5th and 6th Marine Regiments, the 6th Machine Gun Battalion, and the U.S. Army's 2nd Engineers the Croix de guerre.

During the battle, a German intelligence report highlighted the US Army's 2nd Infantry Division's savagery: "The Second American Army Division must be considered a very good one and may even perhaps be considered as a storm troop. The different attacks on Belleau Wood were carried out with bravery and dash. The moral effect of our gunfire cannot seriously impede the advance of the American infantry. The Americans’ nerves are not yet worn out. The qualities of the men individually may be described as remarkable. They are physically well set up, their attitude is good, and they range in age from eighteen to twenty-eight years. They lack at present only training and experience to make formidable adversaries. The men are in fine spirits and are filled with naive assurance; the words of a prisoner are characteristic—WE KILL OR GET KILLED!"

General Pershing, commander of the AEF, said, "the Battle of Belleau Wood was for the U.S. the biggest battle since Appomattox and the most considerable engagement American troops had ever had with a foreign enemy."

There were 10 Medals of Honor awarded to nine marines and a Navy hospital apprentice, plus several Navy Crosses to Marine and Navy personnel. Additionally, many Distinguished Service Crosses and various medals for valor were awarded to soldiers in the 2nd Engineers and 7th U.S. Infantry.

== Legacy ==
Marines actively serving in the Fifth and Sixth Marine regiments were authorized to wear the French fourragère on the left shoulder of their uniform to recognize the legacy and valor of their regimental predecessors.

In June 1923, the Marine Band performed a new march called "Belleau Wood" for the first time during the annual Belleau Wood anniversary celebration. Composed by Alfred T. Colony, not Taylor Branson, who later led the Marine Band from 1927 to 1940, it was dedicated to Army Major General James G. Harbord, who commanded the marines during the battle.

In July 1923, Belleau Wood was dedicated as an American battle monument. Major General Harbord was made an honorary Marine and attended the event. In his address, he summed up the future of the site:

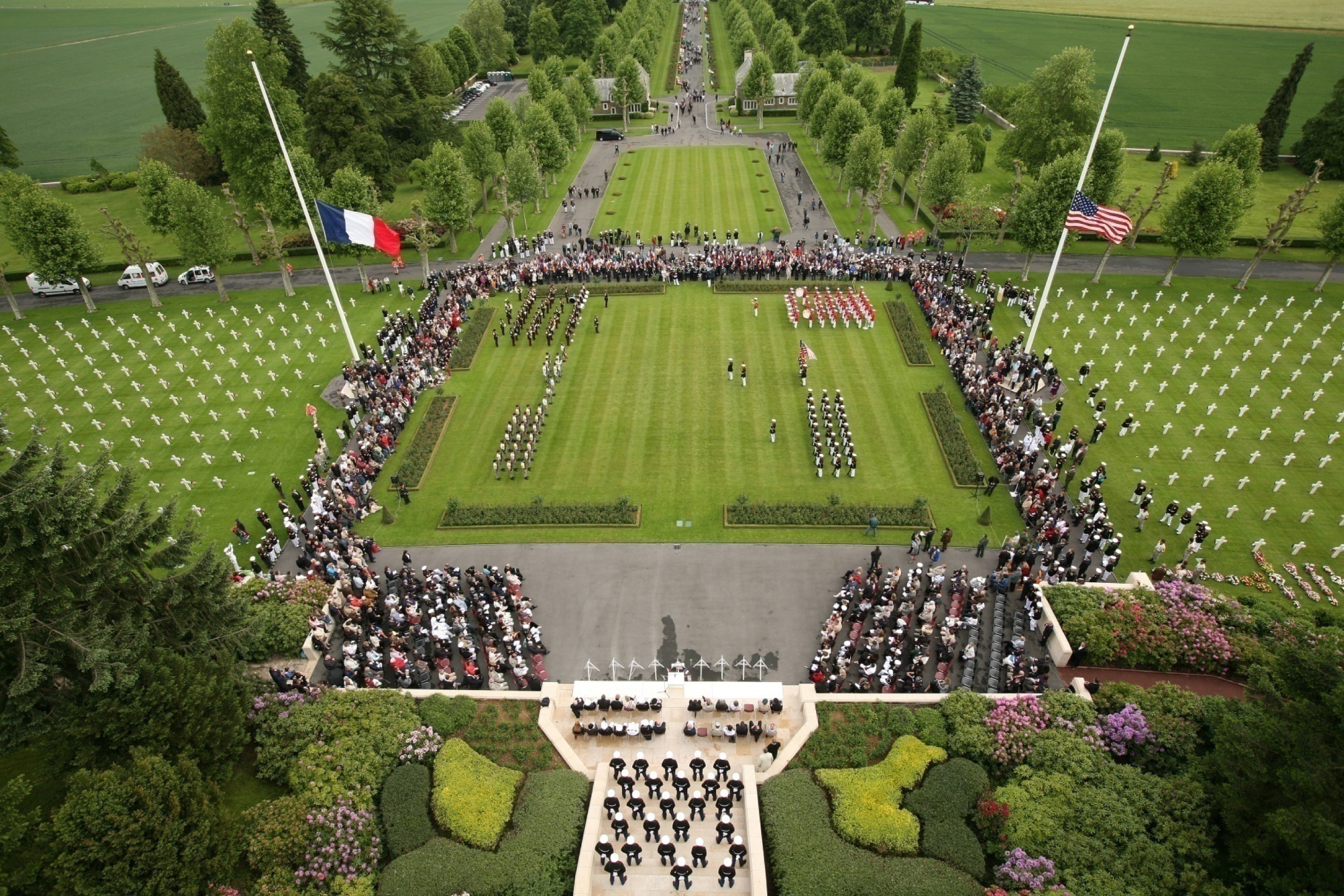
U.S. Marines and French soldiers at the 92nd anniversary memorial service of the battle

Now and then, a veteran, for the brief span that we still survive, will come here to live again the brave days of that distant June. Here will be raised the altars of patriotism; here will be renewed the vows of sacrifice and consecration to country. Hither will come our countrymen in hours of depression, and even of failure, and take new courage from this shrine of great deeds.

White crosses and Stars of David mark 2,289 graves, 250 for unknown service members, and the names of 1,060 missing men adorn the wall of a memorial chapel. Visitors also stop at the nearby German cemetery where 8,625 men are buried; 4,321 of them—3,847 unknown—rest in a common grave. The German cemetery was established in March 1922, consolidating a number of temporary sites, and includes men killed between the Aisne and the Marne in 1918, along with 70 men who died in 1914 in the First Battle of the Marne.

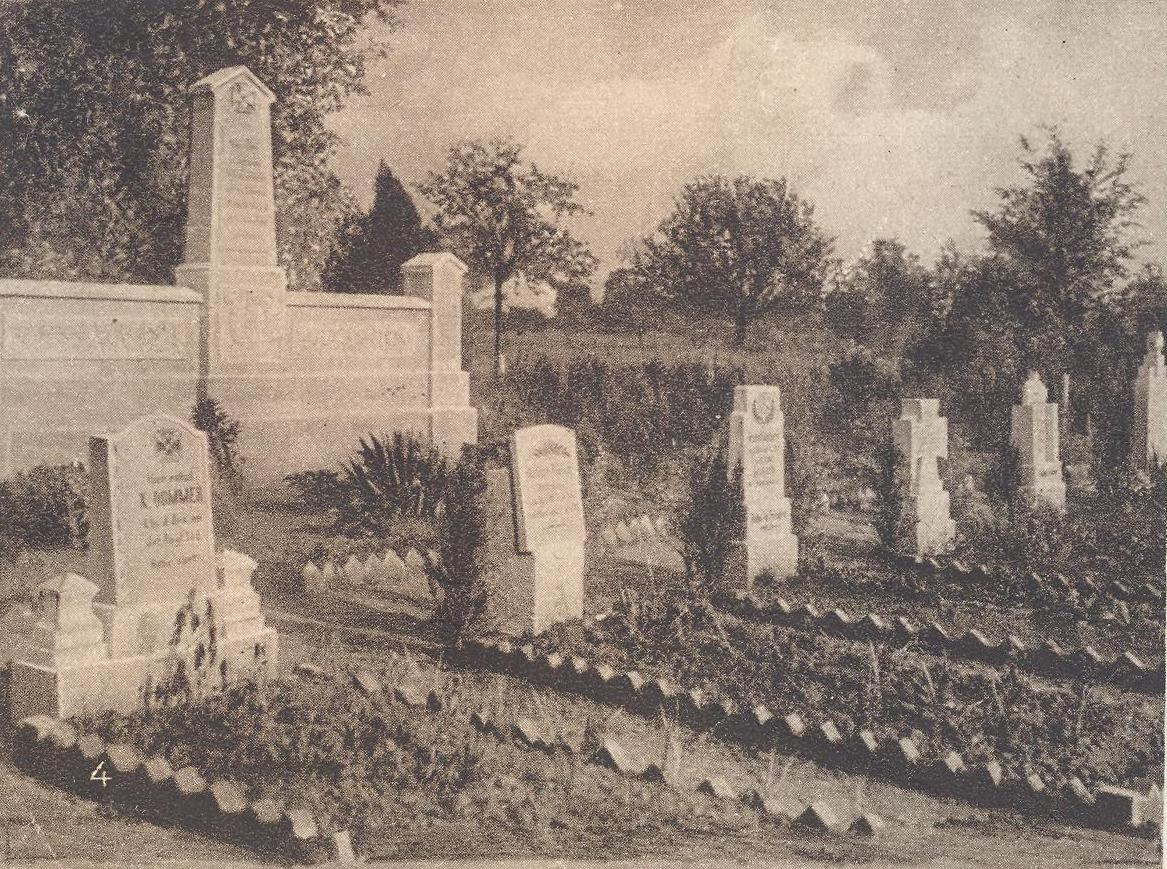
German Cemetery in Beaulieu-Ecuvilly

On 18 November 1955, a black marble monolith with a bronze relief of a fighting Marine was dedicated at a road clearing near the site of the battle. Simply entitled The Marine Memorial, it was sculpted by Felix de Weldon, the artist who had also formed the Marine Corps War Memorial outside of Washington, D.C. The memorial honors the 4th Marine Brigade for their bravery here in June 1918, and is the only memorial in Europe dedicated solely to the United States Marines. Below the statue is a commemorative plaque with a large Eagle, Globe, and Anchor. The plaque includes a brief history of the battle, with text in both English and French. Officiating at the monument's dedication ceremony was then Commandant of the Marine Corps, General Lemuel C. Shepherd Jr., who had fought and was twice wounded at Belleau Wood, and later awarded the Army Distinguished Service Cross and the Navy Cross for his gallantry in action, 37 years earlier.

In New York City, a 0.197-acre (800 m^{2}) triangle at the intersection of 108 Street and 51st Avenue in Queens is dedicated to Marine Private William F. Moore, 47th Company, 2nd Battalion, 5th Marine Regiment.

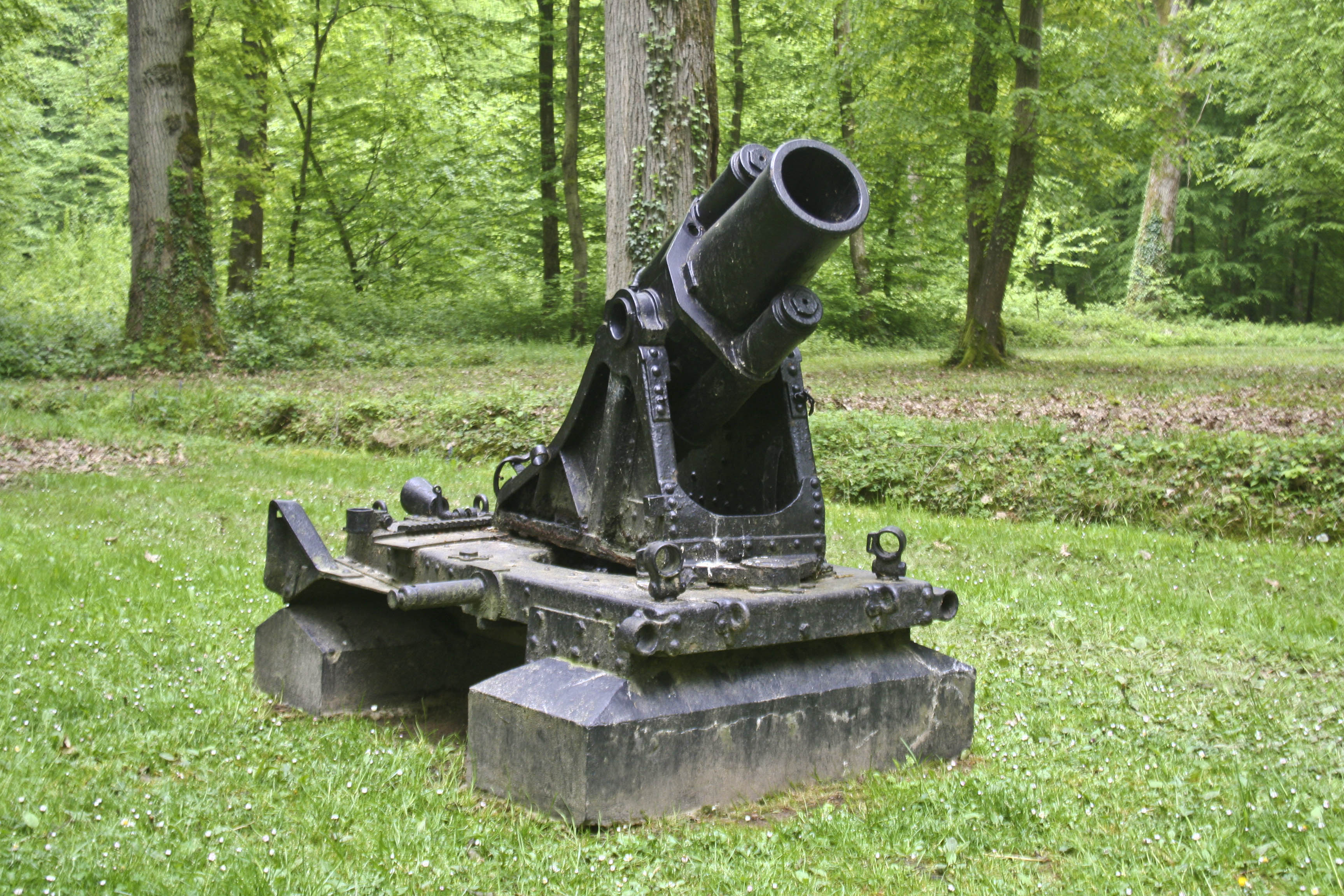
Cannon at Belleau Wood, France

In Boston, a square at the intersection of E Street and 6th Avenue in South Boston is dedicated to Marine Private Thomas Henry Joyce, 47th Company, 3rd Battalion, 5th Marine Regiment. Joyce was posthumously awarded the Croix de Guerre with bronze star for his actions at Belleau Wood: "A most audacious liaison agent. Killed on the night of June 24, 1918, after having on five successive occasions carried messages to the company post of command under violent fire of machine guns and artillery."

Two U.S. Navy vessels have been named for the battle. The first USS Belleau Wood (CVL-24) was a light aircraft carrier active during World War II in the Pacific Theater, from 1943 to 1945. From 1953 to 1960, she was loaned to the French Navy under the name Bois Belleau and served in the First Indochina and Algerian Wars. The second USS Belleau Wood (LHA-3) was active from 1977 to 2005.

A shortened version of Lloyd Williams' famous quote is the basis for the motto the 2nd Battalion, 5th Marines, his unit during the battle. Williams himself has been honored with a building on the campus of his alma mater Virginia Polytechnic Institute and State University named in remembrance of him.

In April 2018, French President Emmanuel Macron presented to the United States a sessile oak sapling from Belleau Wood as part of his state visit. Joe Biden visited the Bois Belleau cemetery to pay tribute to the American marines. Donald Trump owns an oak desk from Belleau Wood, the Trump Desk, created by the French artist Rémi Le Forestier.

The Battle of Belleau Wood was introduced to a new, broader, audience on 19 July 2019, when the Swedish heavy metal band, Sabaton, released their ninth studio album, entitled, "The Great War". The fifth track was entitled "Devil Dogs" and commemorated the battle, the name the Marine Corps earned there, and the significance of the battle to the Corps itself: "Part of the Corps, and the heart of their lore...". Two of the more famous quotes of the battle are also utilized in the song's lyrics: Pershing's words describing the Marine Corps as "The deadliest weapon [on earth]..." and the immortal battlecry of Daly, "Come on, you sons of bitches! Do you want to live forever?!"
