= Richard von Conta =

German general (1856–1941)

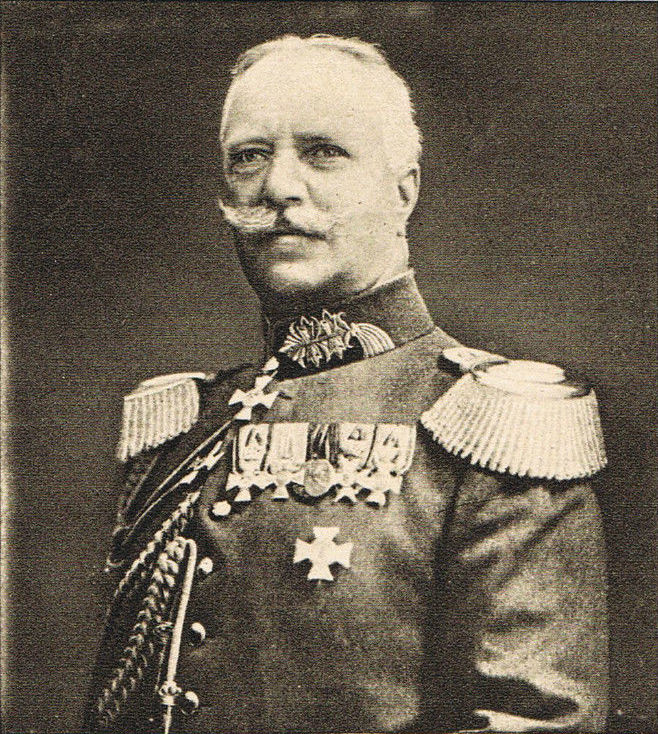
- Born: November 24, 1856; Tuchel, Province of Prussia, Kingdom of Prussia
- Died: January 30, 1941 (aged 84); Frankfurt an der Oder, Gau March of Brandenburg, Nazi Germany
- Military career
- Allegiance: German Empire; Weimar Republic
- Branch: Imperial German Army; Reichswehr
- Service years: 1874–1919
- Rank: General der Infanterie
- Commands: 1st Division; IV Reserve Corps
- Conflicts: World War I: Battle of Tannenberg; First Battle of the Masurian Lakes; Battle of Belleau Wood
- Awards: Pour le Mérite with Oak Leaves; House Order of Hohenzollern

Richard Heinrich Karl von Conta (November 24, 1856 – January 30, 1941) was a German General der Infanterie during World War I. He was notable for his participation in the Battle of Belleau Wood.

== Biography ==
=== Early years ===
He was the son of the later Prussian major general Richard von Conta and his wife Coelestine Adelheid, born von Kahlden (1832-1893). His younger brother Alfred (1858–1927) also embarked on a military career and made it up to lieutenant general.

=== Military career ===
Coming from the cadet corps, Conta joined the 13th (1st Westphalian) Infantry Regiment of the Imperial German Army on July 23, 1874 as a characterized ensign. He was promoted to second lieutenant on October 12, 1875 and served as adjutant of the 2nd Battalion in Münster from mid-August 1878 to early June 1885. As a prime lieutenant, he then worked in the 3rd Company and was transferred to the brigade staff of the 37th Infantry Brigade as an adjutant on March 22, 1889. There he was promoted to captain on January 27, 1891. Conta then was in command of the 5th Company of the 95th (6th Thuringian) Infantry Regiment in Hildburghausen from February 14, 1891 to March 21, 1897 and later served the 2nd Company in Gotha. Afterwards he became an adjutant at the German General Command of the XVII. Army Corps. On January 27, 1898, Conta was simultaneously promoted to Major in the 98th (Metz) Infantry Regiment. Conta eventually returned to line service with an appointment as commander of the 1st Battalion of the 5th Guards Grenadiers. On January 27, 1905, now as Lieutenant Colonel, he was transferred to the 116th (2nd Grand Ducal Hessian) Infantry Regiment at Giessen. Promoted to colonel on April 14, 1907, Conta led the 80th (Kurhessian) Fusilier Regiment from May 21, 1907 to March 19, 1911. He was then appointed commander of the 18th Infantry Brigade while being promoted to major general. Conta gave up this command on December 31, 1913 and became lieutenant general and commander of the prestigious 1st Division in Königsberg.

Conta led his division as part of the I Corps and the 8th Army on the Eastern Front when World War I broke out. In August he distinguished himself under General Hermann von François in the Battle of Tannenberg, specifically in the Battle of Usdau and in September 1914 in the First Battle of the Masurian Lakes. Between November 25 and 29, his division fought near Łódź and advanced towards Łowicz-Sanniki at the beginning of December 1914. At the turn of the year 1915 his division was in position in the Bolimow area on the Rawka-Bzura. In January 1915, Conta's division relocated to the Carpathian Front and served the South Army as a subordinate to General Alexander von Linsingen. On March 23, 1915, Conta's division was subordinated to the Bothmer Corps, and together with the 3rd Guards Infantry Division, they stormed the Zwinin on April 9. At the end of June 1915 his troops crossed the Dniester, in mid-July he fought near Hrubieszow and at the beginning of August his division reached Chelm. For his achievements, Conta received the Commander's Cross of the Royal House Order of Hohenzollern with Swords on May 14, 1915.

At the beginning of March 1916, the 1st Division was transferred to the Western Front and fought in the Battle of Verdun. On August 7, 1916, Conta became the commanding general of the IV Reserve Corps, back in the east. For the achievements of his troops in the defense of the Brusilov Offensive, Conta was awarded the order Pour le Mérite on October 15, 1916. In the spring of 1918, the IV Reserve Corps moved to the Western Front, initially stood in the salient of St. Mihiel and then became part of the 18th Army, commanded by General Oskar von Hutier, for Operation Michael. For the success of his corps, Conta was awarded the Oak Leaves for the Order Pour le Mérite on March 26, 1918. During the Third Battle of the Aisne, the IV. Reserve Corps was added to the 7th Army. In June 1918, Conta's corps faced fresh United States Marine Corps units as they marched to the Marne during the Battle of Belleau Wood. At the end of July, due to strong counter-attacks by the French, the evacuation of the Marne position became necessary and his troops were brought back to their old starting area. In August 1918 he was awarded the Order of the Crown, 1st Class with Swords on the Ring; and was promoted to General of the Infantry.

After the end of the war, Conta led his troops back home. After the demobilization of his General Command he tendered his resignation and was retired from military service on January 6, 1919.

=== Family ===
Conta had married Katharine von Hennig (1861-1909) on May 31, 1882 in Thorn. The following children were born from the marriage:

- Horst (* 1883), Prussian captain
- Mathilde (* 1885), head nurse of the German Red Cross
- Richard (* 1888), businessman
- Gottlieb (* 1897), Prussian lieutenant
