= Mary Annette Anderson =

American educator (1874–1922)

- Anderson c. 1899
- Born: July 27, 1874; Shoreham, Vermont, U.S.
- Died: May 2, 1922 (aged 47); Shoreham, Vermont
- Education: Middlebury College (B.S.)
- Occupation: Professor
- Employer: Howard University
- Spouse: Walter Lucius Smith
- Relatives: William J. Anderson (brother)

Mary Annette Anderson (July 27, 1874 – May 2, 1922) was an American professor of grammar and history and the first African-American woman elected to Phi Beta Kappa.

== Biography ==
Anderson was born on July 27, 1874, in Shoreham, Vermont, to William and Philomine (Langlois) Anderson. Her father, a farmer, was a freed slave originally from Virginia, and her mother was a Canadian immigrant of French and Native American ancestry. Her younger brother, William John Anderson Jr., became the second African American to serve in the Vermont General Assembly. Anderson attended Northfield School for Young Ladies in Northfield, Massachusetts, and entered Middlebury College in 1895. She graduated in 1899 as valedictorian, becoming the first African-American woman elected to Phi Beta Kappa.

After graduation, Anderson taught for a year at Straight University in New Orleans, before being appointed a professor of English grammar and history at Howard University. She taught at Howard for seven years before marrying Walter Lucius Smith, principal of Paul Laurence Dunbar School in Washington, D.C., on August 7, 1907, and gave up teaching. She and her husband bought a summer home in Shoreham in 1919.

She died on May 2, 1922, after a short illness, and is buried in Shoreham's Lake View Cemetery.
