= Richard G. Desautels =

Richard George Desautels
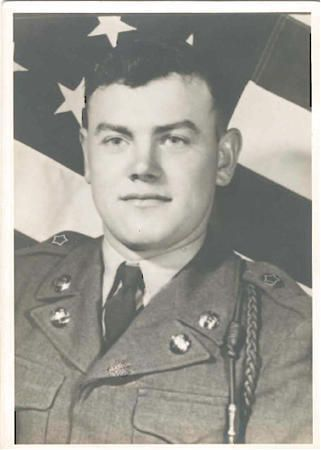
- Richard Desautels, c. 1950
- Born: April 9, 1932; Shoreham, Vermont, US
- Died: 1953 (aged 20–21); Shenyang, China
- Military career
- Allegiance: United States of America
- Branch: United States Army
- Service years: 1949–1952
- Rank: Sergeant
- Units: A Company, 2nd Engineer Battalion, 2nd Infantry Division
- Conflicts: Korean War
- Awards: Prisoner of War Medal; Purple Heart (partial list)
- Other work: Died in Captivity

Sergeant Richard George Desautels was a United States Army corporal who was captured on December 1, 1950, at Sonchu by communist forces and not returned by North Korea at the end of the fighting of the Korean War. More than half a century later, the People's Republic of China admitted that Sgt. Desautels died while in captivity in China, and that his remains were buried in Shenyang, China.

== Early life ==
Richard Desautels was from Shoreham, Vermont. After growing up on a farm, he joined the U.S. Army at age 17. Originally stationed in Fort Lewis (near Tacoma, Washington), he was transferred to South Korea in August 1950 shortly after North Korea invaded the South.

== Army service in Korea ==
Desautels was assigned to A Company, 2nd Engineer Battalion, 2nd Infantry Division, when his unit was overrun by a Chinese assault near Kunu-ri, North Korea, on December 1, 1950. At the time, he had attained the rank of corporal.

He was last seen alive at Camp 5 in Pyoktong, North Korea on August 7, 1953.

== Return of war dead controversy ==
The Korean War Armistice Agreement was signed in 1953. One of the provisions of the agreement was for all sides to return the bodies of soldiers from the opposing side by October 30, 1954, namely to the Korean Communication Zone (KCOMZ). This exchange was carried out as Op Plan 14–54, also known as Operation Glory.

The People's Republic of China had said no Americans were moved to Chinese territory from North Korea, however, authorities from the People's Republic of China gave Pentagon officials details about Desautels in a March 2003 meeting in Beijing contradicting their prior claim. This was not released until 2008 because the information was kept confidential and was only released to the family.

There are reports that North Korea kept some American POWs after the war in retaliation for U.S. refusal to repatriate those American-held POWs who did not want to return. Gen. Mark W. Clark, former American commander of U.S. forces during the war wrote that "we had solid evidence" that hundreds of American POWs were kept after the war, possibly to gain leverage to replace the Republic of China with the People's Republic of China as the holder of the United Nations seat for China.

== Post-war POW ==
Communist reports are that Desautels became mentally ill and died on April 29, 1953. He was buried in Shenyang, formerly known as Mukden. That area has been cited as where prison(s) holding hundreds of American POWs were kept, possibly as a transfer point to bring them to Russia.

At least 19 reports from former POWs held with Desautels were made, stating that he was alive. Desautels spoke Chinese and had disputes with his Chinese captors. According to Chinese reports, he was buried but his body was reburied during a construction project and the location is not known.

== Promotion ==
During his imprisonment, Desautels was promoted to the rank of sergeant.

== See also ==
- United States Senate Select Committee on POW/MIA Affairs
- Eugene DeBruin
