= JoAnne Carson =

American painter and sculptor

- Born: 1953 (age 72–73); New York, New York, United States
- Education: University of Chicago, University of Illinois at Chicago
- Known for: Painting, sculpture, assemblage
- Spouse: Jim Butler
- Awards: Guggenheim Fellowship, American Academy of Arts and Letters, American Academy in Rome, National Endowment for the Arts
- Website: JoAnne Carson

JoAnne Carson, View of the Alley, oil paint on wood and objects, 90" x 96" x 26", 1983. Collection of the Modern Art Museum of Fort Worth.

JoAnne Carson (born 1953) is an American artist who is known for over-the-top, hybrid works in painting, sculpture and assemblage that freely mix fantasy, illusion and narrative, high and low cultural allusions, and seriocomic intent. She first gained widespread attention in the 1980s for what ARTnews critic Dan Cameron described as "extraordinary painted constructions—kaleidoscopic assemblages chock full of trompe-l’oeil painting, art-history quips, found objects and nostalgic echoes of early modernism." New York Times critic Roberta Smith wrote that Carson's subsequent work progressed methodically into three dimensions, culminating in freestanding botanical sculpture that exuded "giddy beauty" and "unapologetic decorativeness"; her later imaginary landscapes have been described as whimsical spectacles of "Disneyesque horror." Carson has been recognized with a Guggenheim Fellowship, awards from the American Academy of Arts and Letters, American Academy in Rome and National Endowment for the Arts, and Yaddo artist residencies. Her work has been exhibited at institutions including the Whitney Museum of American Art, Museum of Contemporary Art Chicago (MCA), Albright-Knox Gallery, New Orleans Museum of Art, and Institute of Contemporary Art, Philadelphia; it belongs to the public art collections of the Brooklyn Museum of Art, MCA Chicago, Frederick R. Weisman Art Foundation, and Modern Art Museum of Fort Worth, among others.

== Life and career ==
Carson was born in New York City in 1953 and raised in suburban Baltimore. Her mother, Edith Sachar, was a sculptor and jeweler and the first wife of painter Mark Rothko; her father, George Carson, was an engineer who worked in Westinghouse’s aeronautics division. After beginning college in Maryland, Carson completed art studies at the University of Illinois at Chicago (BA, 1976) and University of Chicago (MFA, 1979), producing abstract paintings on shaped canvasses, often with narrative themes.

Shortly after graduating, Carson shifted to large three-dimensional paintings featuring constructed and found objects. She exhibited actively in group shows at N.A.M.E. Gallery and Hallwalls (1978–9) and solo exhibitions at Nancy Lurie Gallery, N.A.M.E., MCA Chicago and the Modern Art Museum of Fort Worth, attracting national reviews, museum acquisitions and grants, including a one-year American Academy in Rome residency. In 1985, she exhibited in the Whitney Biennial and received a Southeastern Center for Contemporary Art (SECCA) Award in the Visual Arts, which included a cash prize and a yearlong traveling exhibition. That year she also accepted an assistant professorship at University at Albany, SUNY and moved to New York City, shuttling between a lower Manhattan loft and the university.

In the next decade, Carson exhibited at the Ruth Siegel (New York), Dart (Chicago), Eva Mannes (Atlanta) and Sylvia Schmidt (New Orleans) galleries; in the 2000s, she has had solo exhibitions at the University of Maine Art Museum, and the Black and White, Claire Oliver, Joan Washburn and Plus Ultra galleries in New York, and appeared in group shows at the Fleming Museum of Art, National Academy Museum and Sheldon Art Museum, among others. Carson continues to teach at University at Albany, having been promoted to Professor in 2006 and served two terms as Department Chair. She splits time between Brooklyn and rural Vermont with her husband, artist and professor Jim Butler.

JoAnne Carson, Carnival of Values, oil paint on wood and objects, 92" x 80" x 24", 1990.

== Work ==
Carson's work has moved freely between painting, sculpture, and eventually, landscape art. Critics compared the dualistic space of her constructed paintings from the 1980s to "pop-up" reinventions of Cubist painting. Throughout the 1990s and 2000s, she focused increasingly on sculptural, nature-focused work; in the 2010s, she began to translate that sculptural world back into pictorial space in fantastical paintings and drawings.

=== Constructed paintings (1980–1993) ===
Carson's first constructed paintings were large, complex works that featured canny modernist art references, interpenetrating fragmented images, and built forms and found objects (e.g., gutted televisions, wooden chairs, guitars, window shutters) that she camouflaged with illusionistic painting and Cubist-like multiplying perspectives. Critics such as Ken Johnson described them as whirlpool- or "tornado-like" works that exploded the shallow space of traditional painting, capriciously gathering widespread elements into a referential vortex noted for its attention to composition and finish. Art in America's Susan Freudenheim suggested that works such as The Broken Pitcher (1982) or Palettable (1981) enacted both a "purgative" Oedipal struggle against modernist masters and a reinterpretation of them, likening the former work to "an encounter between a hurricane and Cezanne's Still Life, ca. 1900."

JoAnne Carson, Tree of Desire, fiberglass, oil paint, objects, 108" x 94" x 32", 1993.

After Carson's Rome residency (1983–4), writers such as Peter Frank noted a new synthesis of Renaissance influences, indicated by richer palettes and painterly detail as well as her greater interest in the human figure, legends and myth. These paintings were structurally flatter, but more texturally dense, their surfaces crammed with puns, symbols, illusions, ornate patterning and spatial ambiguity; in some, fragmented elements and objects referenced Cubist works by Juan Gris and Braque (e.g., View of the Alley 1983), while more narratively elaborate works recalled the vignettes of Hieronymus Bosch and Giorgio de Chirico (e.g., Chute and Ladders, 1985). Dan Cameron described them as aimed "squarely into the postmodern present," their narrative imagery "torn between a romanticized past and a present suffering from media burnout." MCA Chicago curator Lynne Warren called them "rhapsodies on visual richness only possible in the 20th century."

By the end of the 1980s, Carson returned to more sculptural work that reviews noted for its heightened urgency, increasingly surrealist sensibility, and disturbing references to the body, fractured identity, loss and desire. Carnival of Values (1990) typified this work; it was a large oval canvas featuring a Magritte-like, bowler-capped man layered over an affixed television chassis with protruding arms and legs and a great eye in the center, surrounded by clock-like, three-dimensional numerals and an inverted hat filled with sloshing blood. This work culminated with the larger-than-life, transitional figure-plant relief, Tree of Desire (1993), whose form and fecund symbolism signaled Carson's coming embrace of the nature-related imagery.

=== Sculpture (1999– ) ===
JoAnne Carson, Bouquet, thermoplastic, fiberglass, aqua resin, 105"x 84", 2001.

During the 1990s, Carson's work proceeded from painting to painted relief to painstakingly detailed, plant-focused wall sculptures (e.g., Yellow Rose, 1999) to stand-alone, three-dimensional sculpture in the early 2000s; she has likened her process during that time to constructing large drawings in space. Her 1999 relief Wood Nymph combined fantasy, reality and illusion in an eight-armed, pie-wielding, torso-less Kali-like figure that seemed to emerge from a cross-section of California redwood, which was actually wood, fiberglass, cloth, and plaster seamlessly integrated beneath a veneer of trompe l'oeil wood grain. Carson's 2001 solo exhibition at Plus Ultra Gallery consisted of a single freestanding sculpture: the nine-foot tall, thermoplastic and aqua resin Bouquet, an icy turquoise-purple arrangement mixing recognizable, anatomically correct and imaginary, slightly sinister flowers. Roberta Smith wrote that the work's fragility and exaggerated scale generated unapologetically decorative, "giddy beauty" and metaphors engaging subjects from genetic engineering to social tolerance and coexistence.

Carson's subsequent sculpture took on a more colorful, whimsical quality, offering freestanding riffs on mutation and decoration through invented floral-animal hybrid forms. Works such as Puppet's Dream (2004), Blue (2006) and Sampler (2007) depicted six-, four- and two-legged intermingled creatures sprouting festive groupings of flowers, spirals, leaves and pom-poms that hovered between organic and synthetic; in the later sculpture, Chlorophylia (For a World without Color) (2017), Carson returned to the icy monochromism of Bouquet. Carson exhibited her sculpture extensively at galleries and venues including the American Academy of Arts and Letters, the Brooklyn Museum of Art, and the National Academy Museum.

=== Later painting and drawing (2010– ) ===
JoAnne Carson, Wishful Thinking, acrylic on canvas, 39" x 48", 2019.

Carson returned to painting in the 2010s, pictorially expanding on the world of her sculptures with imaginary, futuristic landscapes and floral portraits that suggest narrative dramas with plants as protagonists. Her drawings form a visual and conceptual stepping-stone between her painting and sculpture; they were all exhibited together in her shows, "Hyper Flora" (2018, Big Town Gallery) and "Rise Up and Shine!" (2019 retrospective, Sage College of Albany). Like her early work, Carson's later painting draws on "high" art influences such as Cubism and Surrealism as well as popular culture inspirations, such as Looney Tunes cartoons. Critics describe them as over-the-top, hallucinogenic spectacles that "teeter on the edge of picturesque and grotesque," populated by anthropomorphic hybrid vegetation, alive with expressive petals and synthetic, pixel-like patterning (Early Spring, 2011) or eyes, fangs and animated limbs (Knotty Pine, 2016); reviews have compared them to the fantastical imagery of filmmaker Tim Burton, The Simpsons and Little Shop of Horrors.

Critics consider this later work's intent seriocomic—both cautionary and celebratory. It directly engages the art historical fetishizing of nature as spiritual, authentic (e.g., the work of Constable and the Hudson River School) or feminized nurturer, as well as contemporary anxieties regarding aggressive land use, climate change, the lost "Arcadian" past, and what is "natural" in an age of cloning, genetic engineering, and technological tinkering; Carson describes the latter as "culture's paradoxical wish to believe in science as the new alchemy." At the same time, writers regard the delight in teeming energy and growth, exuberant color and freakish mutation in works such as Wishful Thinking and Breezy (both 2019) as a testimony to the possibility of beauty and the resourcefulness of life, even under dire conditions.

=== Landscape art ===
Since 2011, Carson has cultivated a large, terraced, sculptural garden on her property in rural Shoreham, Vermont, which she envisions as a living, dimensional landscape painting and a practice that overlaps her art, with inspiration running in both directions. Like the forms in her paintings and sculpture, the garden is a hybrid of domesticated and wild, organic and "synthetic" (as in human-designed), combining slate stones, evergreen topiaries shaped as tapering spirals, fruit trees, hydrangeas and an extensive variety of perennials; writer Ric Kasini Kadour describes the garden as resembling one that Dr. Seuss might have planted.

== Awards and public collections ==
Carson has received awards from the John S. Guggenheim Foundation (2016), American Academy of Arts and Letters (Purchase Prize in Sculpture, 2002), National Academy Museum (Ellin P. Speyer Award for Sculpture, 2008), SECCA (Award in the Visual Arts 4, 1985), American Academy in Rome (Prix de Rome, Painting, 1983), Illinois Arts Council (1983) and National Endowment for the Arts (1982), among others. She has also been recognized with artist residencies from Yaddo (Louise Bourgeois Residency for Sculpture, 2007; 2005). Carson's work belongs to the public art collections of the Brooklyn Museum of Art, Museum of Contemporary Art Chicago, Frederick R. Weisman Art Foundation, Modern Art Museum of Fort Worth, Smart Museum of Art, Joslyn Art Museum, Koehnline Museum of Art, Sheldon Museum of Art, and University Art Museum at University at Albany.
