= Shoreham, Vermont =

- Town
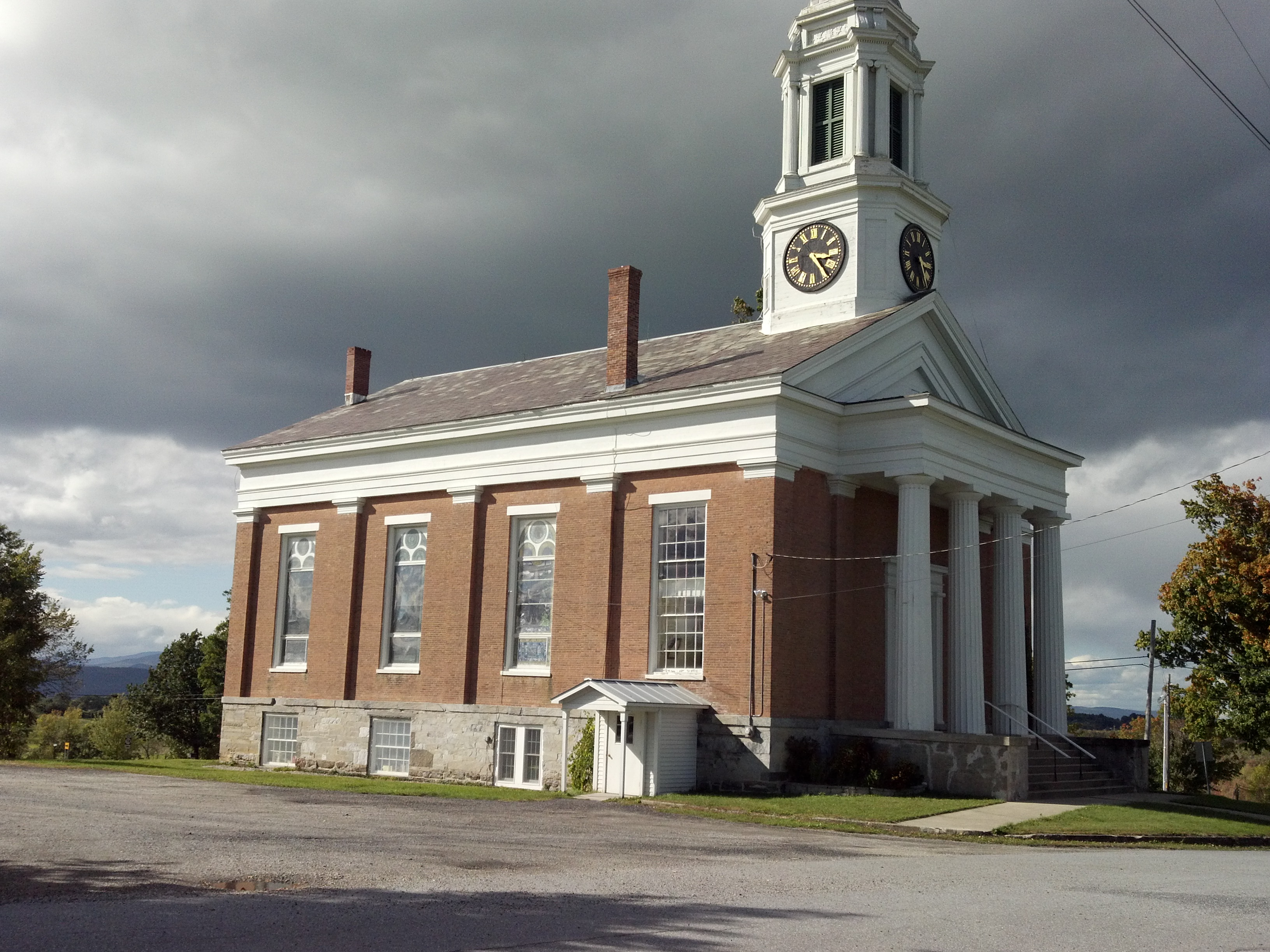
- Shoreham Congregational Church

- Location in Addison County and the state of Vermont
- Coordinates: 43°53′41″N 73°19′05″W
- Country: United States
- State: Vermont
- County: Addison
- Communities: Shoreham; Cream Hill; East Shoreham; Richville

Area
  - Total: 46.4 sq mi (120.1 km^{2})
  - Land: 43.4 sq mi (112.5 km^{2})
  - Water: 2.9 sq mi (7.6 km^{2})
- Elevation: 325 ft (99 m)

Population (2020)
  - Total: 1,260
  - Density: 29/sq mi (11.2/km^{2})
- Time zone: UTC-5 (Eastern (EST))
  - Summer (DST): UTC-4 (EDT)
- ZIP codes: 05770 (Shoreham); 05778 (Whiting)
- Area code: 802
- FIPS code: 50-65050
- GNIS feature ID: 1462209
- Website: www.shorehamvt.us

Shoreham /ˈʃɔːrəm/ is a town in Addison County, Vermont, United States. The population was 1,260 at the 2020 census.

== Geography ==
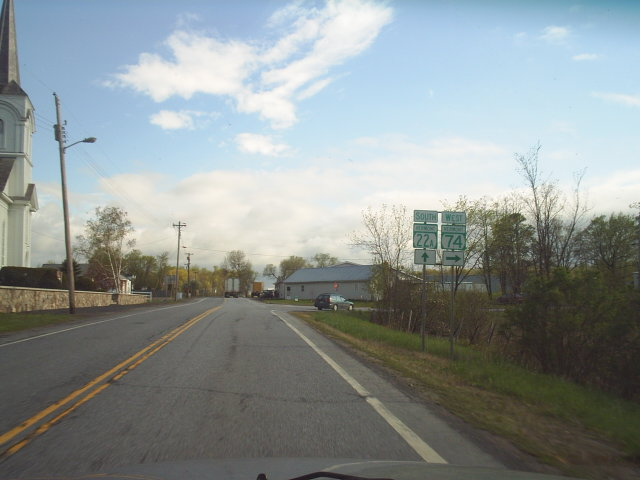
VT 74 and VT 22A junction at Shoreham village

Shoreham is located in western Addison County along the shore of Lake Champlain. The western boundary of the town, which follows the center of the lake, is also the state border with New York. Neighboring Vermont towns are Bridport to the north, Cornwall and Whiting to the east, and Orwell to the south. Ticonderoga, New York, is to the west across Lake Champlain, accessible in the summertime by the Ticonderoga–Larrabees Point Ferry, a diesel-powered cable ferry.

According to the United States Census Bureau, Shoreham has a total area of 46.4 square miles (120.1 km^{2}), of which 43.4 square miles (112.5 km^{2}) is land and 2.9 square miles (7.6 km^{2}), or 6.36%, is water.

The village of Shoreham is located at the intersection of Vermont Route 22A and Vermont Route 74.

== Demographics ==
Historical population
Census	Pop.	Note	%±
1790	721		—
1800	1,447		100.7%
1810	2,033		40.5%
1820	1,881		−7.5%
1830	2,137		13.6%
1840	1,675		−21.6%
1850	1,601		−4.4%
1860	1,382		−13.7%
1870	1,225		−11.4%
1880	1,354		10.5%
1890	1,240		−8.4%
1900	1,193		−3.8%
1910	1,098		−8.0%
1920	925		−15.8%
1930	948		2.5%
1940	865		−8.8%
1950	829		−4.2%
1960	786		−5.2%
1970	790		0.5%
1980	972		23.0%
1990	1,115		14.7%
2000	1,222		9.6%
2010	1,265		3.5%
2020	1,260		−0.4%
U.S. Decennial Census

As of the census of 2000, there were 1,222 people, 453 households, and 342 families residing in the town. The population density was 28.1 people per square mile (10.8 people/km^{2}). There were 556 housing units at an average density of 12.8 units per square mile (4.9 units/km^{2}). The racial makeup of the town was 98.53% White, 0.65% African American, 0.25% Native American, 0.33% Asian, and 0.25% from two or more races. Hispanic or Latino of any race were 0.49% of the population.

There were 453 households, out of which 36.2% had children under the age of 18 living with them, 64.7% were couples living together and joined in either marriage or civil union, 7.7% had a female householder with no husband present, and 24.3% were non-families. 18.1% of all households were made up of individuals, and 6.0% had someone living alone who was 65 years of age or older. The average household size was 2.70 and the average family size was 3.08.

In the town, the age distribution of the population shows 27.5% under the age of 18, 6.1% from 18 to 24, 28.2% from 25 to 44, 25.9% from 45 to 64, and 12.4% who were 65 years of age or older. The median age was 38 years. For every 100 females, there were 98.7 males. For every 100 females age 18 and over, there were 100.0 males.

The median income for a household in the town was $39,375, and the median income for a family was $43,958. Males had a median income of $27,321 versus $21,912 for females. The per capita income for the town was $17,650. About 4.9% of families and 7.5% of the population were below the poverty line, including 7.8% of those under age 18 and 4.7% of those age 65 or over.

== History ==
Early in the morning of May 10, 1775, American and Green Mountain Boy militias under the command of Ethan Allen and Benedict Arnold sailed across Lake Champlain from Hand's Cove, in what is today Shoreham, to take part in the Capture of Fort Ticonderoga.

== Notable people ==
- Mary Annette Anderson, African American professor and first to be Phi Beta Kappa
- William John Anderson, farmer and second African American to be elected to the Vermont General Assembly
- Ansel Briggs, first governor of Iowa
- JoAnne Carson, painter and sculptor, Guggenheim Fellow (2016)
- John W. Cary, state senator from Wisconsin
- John Catlin, Acting Governor of Wisconsin Territory
- John Smith Chipman, lawyer and politician from Michigan
- Columbus Delano, United States Secretary of the Interior
- Richard G. Desautels, American POW held by North Korea and China under mysterious circumstances
- Anna M. Fitch (1840-1904), writer
- Selucius Garfielde, delegate from the Territory of Washington
- Augustus C. Hand, lawyer and justice of the New York Supreme Court
- Silas H. Jennison, 14th governor of Vermont
- Levi P. Morton, US congressman, Governor of New York and the 22nd Vice President of the U.S.
- Ebenezer J. Ormsbee, the 41st governor of Vermont
- Charles Rich, US congressman
- Thomas Rowley, poet known as "The Bard of the Green Mountains"
- Joel Turrill (1794–1859), US congressman from New York, born in Shoreham
- Alva Woods (1794–1887), American minister, university professor and president

== See also ==
- WhistlePig
