= Battle for Henderson Field =

Battle of the Pacific campaign of World War II (1942)

- Part of the Pacific Theater of World War II
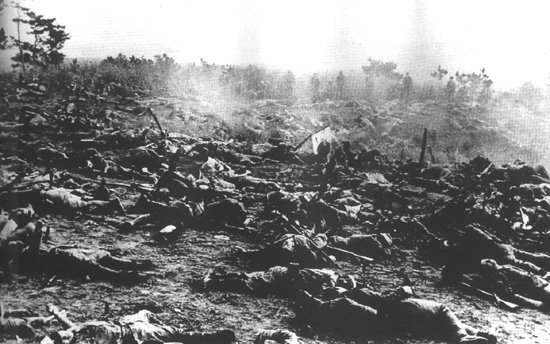
- Dead soldiers from the Japanese 16th and 29th Infantry Regiments and American 7th Marines cover the battlefield after the failed assaults on 25–26 October.
Date	23–26 October 1942
Location	9°26′51″S 160°2′56″E; Guadalcanal in the Solomon Islands
Result	American victory

Belligerents
United States	Empire of Japan

Commanders and leaders
Alexander Vandegrift; William Rupertus	Harukichi Hyakutake

Units involved
1st Marine Division; 164th Infantry Regiment; 821st Engineering Aviation Battalion	17th Army

Strength
23,088	20,000

Casualties and losses
61–86 killed, 1 tugboat, 1 patrol boat sunk, 3 aircraft destroyed	2,200–3,000 killed, 1 cruiser sunk, 14 aircraft destroyed

The Battle for Henderson Field, also known as the Battle of Guadalcanal or Battle of Lunga Point by the Japanese, took place from 23 to 26 October 1942 on and around Guadalcanal in the Solomon Islands. The battle was a land, sea, and air battle of the Pacific campaign of World War II and was fought between the Imperial Japanese Army and Navy and Allied forces, mainly U.S. Marines and Army. The battle was the last of three major land offensives conducted by the Japanese during the Guadalcanal campaign.

In the battle, U.S. Marine and Army forces repulsed an attack by the Japanese 17th Army under the command of Lieutenant General Harukichi Hyakutake. The American forces were defending the Lunga perimeter that guarded Henderson Field on Guadalcanal, which the Allies had captured from the Japanese in landings on Guadalcanal on 7 August 1942. Hyakutake's force was sent to Guadalcanal in response to the Allied landings with the mission of recapturing the airfield and driving the Allied forces off the island. His soldiers conducted numerous assaults over three days at various locations around the Lunga perimeter, all repulsed with heavy Japanese losses. At the same time, Allied aircraft operating from Henderson Field successfully defended American positions on Guadalcanal from attacks by Japanese naval air and sea forces.

The battle was the last serious ground offensive conducted by Japanese forces on Guadalcanal. They attempted to deliver further reinforcements, but failed during the Naval Battle of Guadalcanal in November 1942, and Japan conceded defeat in the struggle for the island and evacuated many of its remaining forces by the first week of February 1943.

== Background ==
=== Guadalcanal campaign ===
On 7 August 1942, Allied forces (primarily U.S.) landed on Guadalcanal, Tulagi, and Florida Islands in the Solomon Islands. The landings on the islands were meant to deny their use by the Japanese as bases for threatening the supply routes between the U.S. and Australia, and to secure the islands as starting points for a campaign with the eventual goal of isolating the major Japanese base at Rabaul while also supporting the Allied New Guinea campaign. The landings initiated the six-month-long Guadalcanal campaign.

Taking the Japanese by surprise, by nightfall on 8 August, the 11,000 Allied troops—under the command of then Major General Alexander Vandegrift and mainly consisting of U.S. Marine Corps units—had secured Tulagi and nearby small islands, as well as an airfield under construction at Lunga Point on Guadalcanal. The airfield was later named "Henderson Field" by Allied forces. The Allied aircraft that subsequently operated out of the airfield became known as the "Cactus Air Force" (CAF) after the Allied codename for Guadalcanal. To protect the airfield, the U.S. Marines established a perimeter defense around Lunga Point.

In response to the Allied landings on Guadalcanal, the Japanese Imperial General Headquarters assigned the Imperial Japanese Army's 17th Army—a corps-sized command based at Rabaul and under the command of Lieutenant-General Harukichi Hyakutake—with the task of retaking Guadalcanal from Allied forces. On 19 August, various units of the 17th Army began to arrive on Guadalcanal with the goal of driving Allied forces from the island.

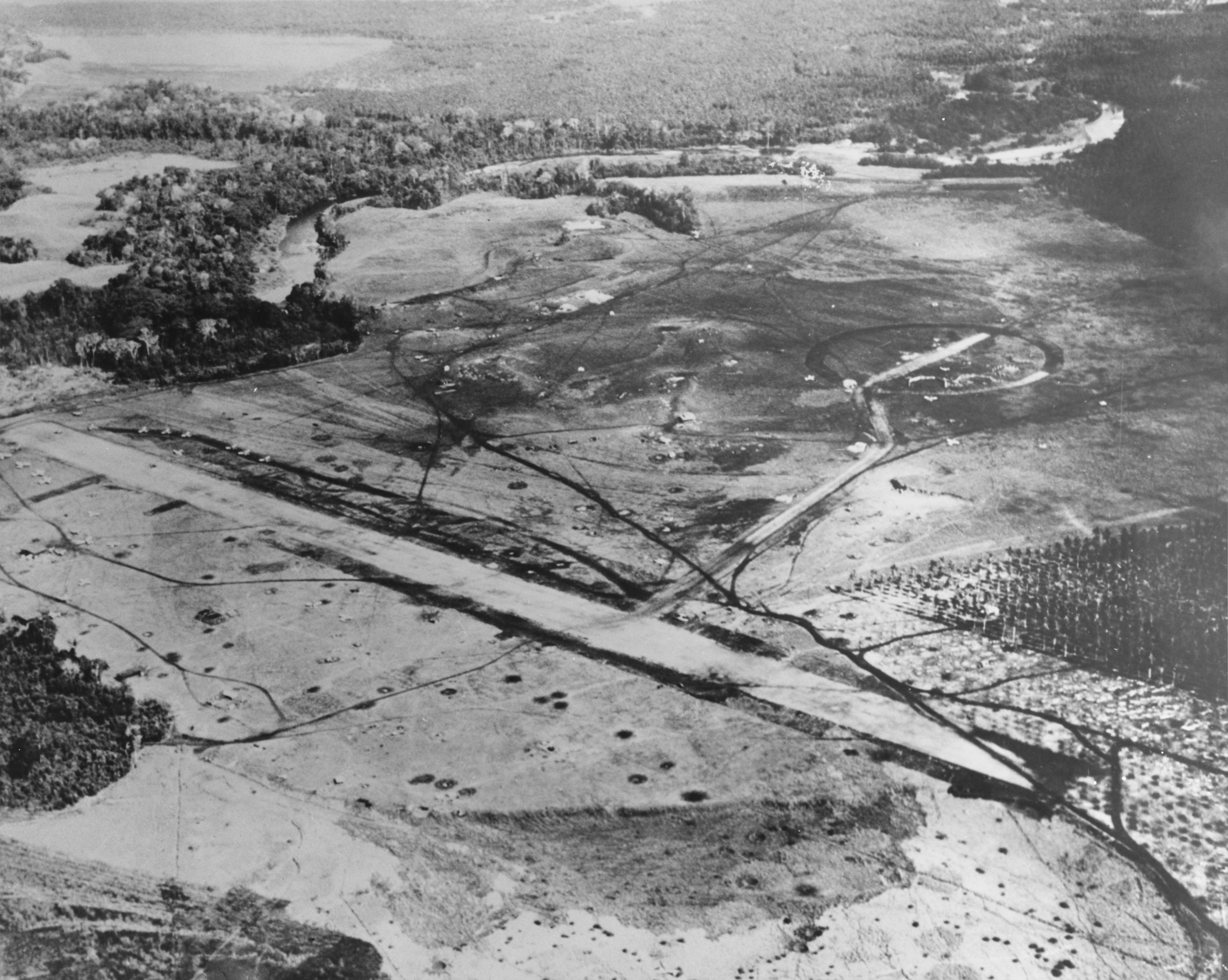
Henderson Field on Guadalcanal in late August 1942, soon after Allied aircraft began operating out of the airfield

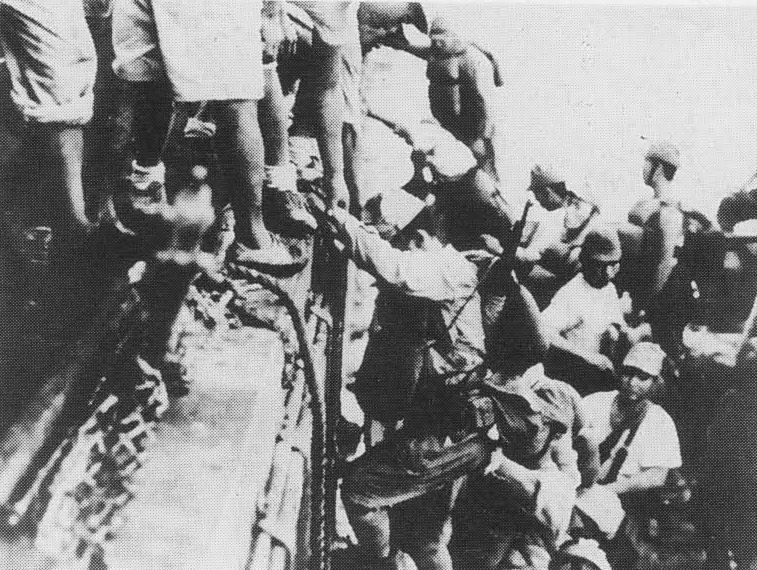
Japanese soldiers are loaded onto the Tokyo Express.

Because of the threat from CAF aircraft based at Henderson Field, the Japanese were unable to use large, slow transport ships to deliver troops and supplies to the island. Instead, the Japanese used warships based at Rabaul and the Shortland Islands to carry their forces to Guadalcanal. The Japanese warships, mainly light cruisers or destroyers from the Eighth Fleet under the command of Vice Admiral Gunichi Mikawa, were usually able to make the round trip down "The Slot" to Guadalcanal and back in a single night, thereby minimizing their exposure to CAF air attack. Delivering the troops in this manner, however, prevented most of the soldiers' heavy equipment and supplies, such as heavy artillery, vehicles, and much food and ammunition, from being carried to Guadalcanal with them. These high speed warship runs to Guadalcanal occurred throughout the campaign and came to be called the "Tokyo Express" by Allied forces and "Rat Transportation" by the Japanese.

The first Japanese attempt to recapture Henderson Field failed when a 917-man force was defeated on 21 August in the Battle of the Tenaru. The next attempt took place from 12 to 14 September, with the 6,000 soldiers under the command of Major General Kiyotake Kawaguchi being defeated in the Battle of Edson's Ridge. After their defeat at Edson's Ridge, Kawaguchi and the surviving Japanese troops regrouped west of the Matanikau River on Guadalcanal.

Hyakutake immediately began to prepare for another attempt to recapture Henderson Field. The Japanese navy promised to support Hyakutake's next offensive by delivering the necessary troops, equipment, and supplies to the island, and by stepping-up air attacks on Henderson Field and sending warships to bombard the airfield.

As the Japanese regrouped, the U.S. forces concentrated on shoring up and strengthening their Lunga defenses. On 18 September, an Allied naval convoy delivered 4,157 men from the U.S. 7th Marine Regiment to Guadalcanal. This regiment had previously formed part of the 3rd Provisional Marine Brigade and was fresh from garrison duty in Samoa. These reinforcements allowed Vandegrift, beginning on 19 September, to establish an unbroken line of defense completely around the Lunga perimeter.

General Vandegrift and his staff were aware that Kawaguchi's troops had retreated to the area west of the Matanikau and that numerous groups of Japanese stragglers were scattered throughout the area between the Lunga perimeter and the Matanikau River. Vandegrift, therefore, decided to conduct a series of small unit operations around the Matanikau Valley.

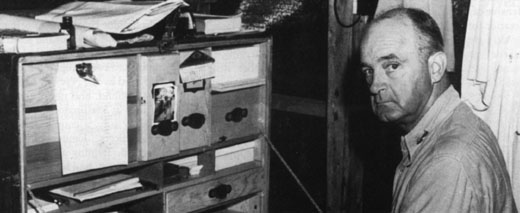
U.S. General Vandegrift in his command tent on Guadalcanal

The first U.S. Marine operation against Japanese forces west of the Matanikau, conducted between 23 and 27 September 1942 by elements of three U.S. Marine battalions, was repulsed by Kawaguchi's troops under Colonel Akinosuke Oka's local command. In the second action, between 6 and 9 October, a larger force of U.S. Marines crossed the Matanikau River, attacked newly landed Japanese forces from the 2nd (Sendai) Infantry Division under the command of generals Masao Maruyama and Yumio Nasu and inflicted heavy casualties on the Japanese 4th Infantry Regiment. The second action forced the Japanese to retreat from their positions east of the Matanikau.

In the meantime, Major General Millard F. Harmon, commander of U.S. Army forces in the South Pacific, convinced Vice Admiral Robert L. Ghormley, commander of Allied forces in the South Pacific Area, that U.S. Marine forces on Guadalcanal needed to be reinforced immediately if the Allies were to successfully defend the island from the next expected Japanese offensive. Thus on 13 October, a naval convoy delivered the 2,837-strong 164th U.S. Infantry Regiment, a North Dakota Army National Guard formation from the U.S. Army's Americal Division, commanded by Colonel Robert Hall, to Guadalcanal.

Mikawa's ships continued nocturnal deliveries of men and materiel to Guadalcanal. Between 1 and 17 October, Japanese convoys delivered 15,000 Japanese troops, comprising the remainder of the 2nd Infantry Division and one regiment of the 38th Infantry Division, plus artillery, tanks, ammunition, and provisions, to Guadalcanal. One of these—on 9 October—landed General Hyakutake on the island to personally lead the Japanese forces in the planned offensive. Mikawa also sent heavy cruisers on several occasions to bombard Henderson Field. On the night of 11 October, one of these bombardment missions was intercepted by U.S. naval forces and defeated in the Battle of Cape Esperance.

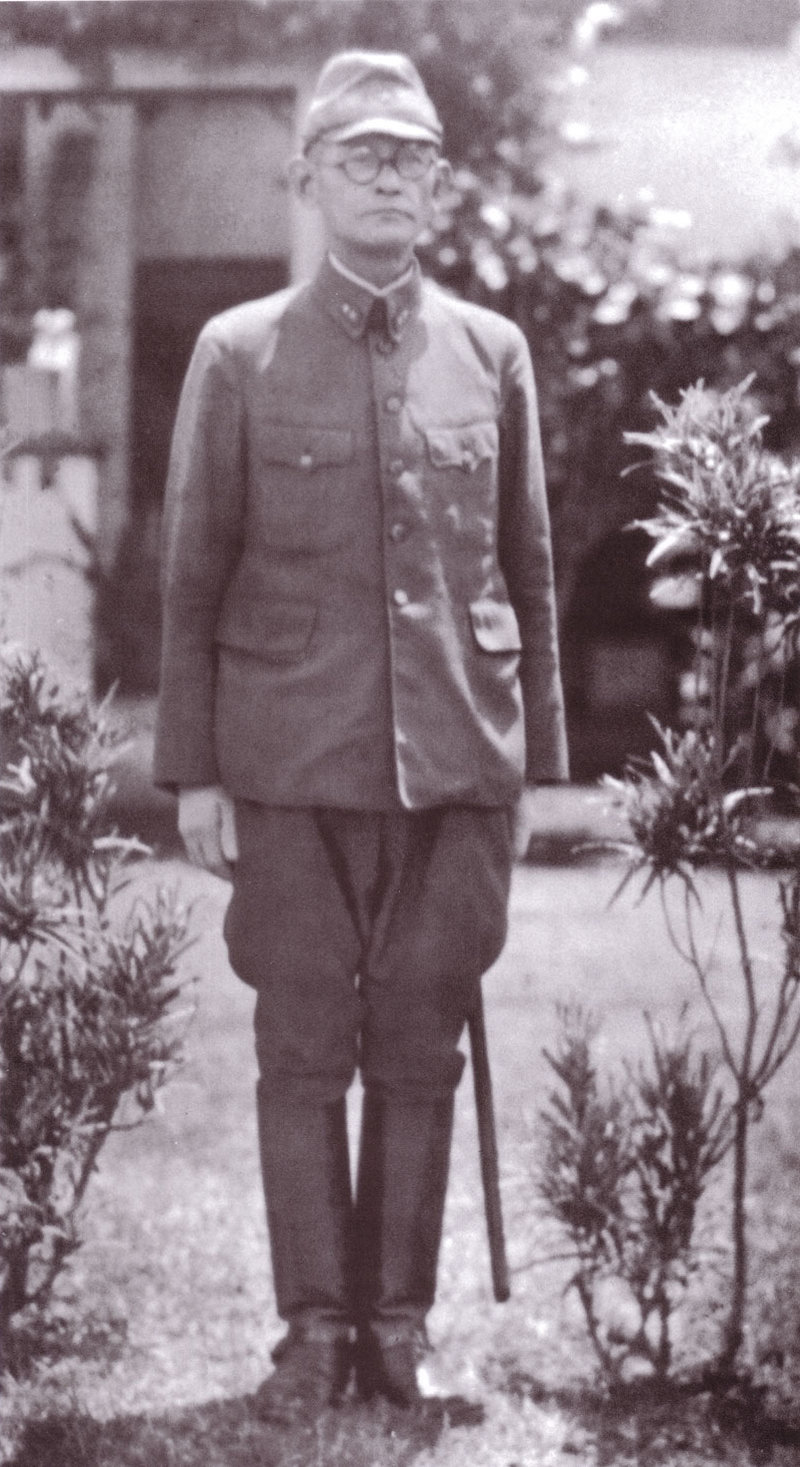
Japanese General Harukichi Hyakutake in front of his headquarters on Rabaul before his deployment to Guadalcanal

On 13 October, in order to help protect the transit of an important supply convoy to Guadalcanal that consisted of six slower cargo ships, the Japanese Combined Fleet commander Isoroku Yamamoto sent a naval force from Truk—commanded by Vice-Admiral Takeo Kurita—to bombard Henderson Field. Kurita's force—consisting of the battleships Kongō and Haruna, escorted by one light cruiser and nine destroyers—approached Guadalcanal unopposed and opened fire on Henderson Field at 01:33 on 14 October. Over the next 83 minutes, they fired 973 14 in (360 mm) shells into the Lunga perimeter, most of them falling in and around the 2,200 m^{2} (24,000 sq ft) area of the airfield. The bombardment heavily damaged the airfield's two runways, burned almost all of the available aviation fuel, destroyed 48 of the CAF's 90 aircraft, and killed 41 men, including six CAF aircrew.

Despite the heavy damage, Henderson personnel were able to restore one of the runways to operational condition within a few hours. Over the next several weeks, the CAF gradually recovered as Allied forces delivered more aircraft, fuel, and aircrew personnel to Guadalcanal. Observing the Japanese deliveries of troops and supplies to the island, American forces were expecting an imminent offensive by Japanese ground forces, but they were not sure where and when it would take place.

=== Troop movement ===
Because of the loss of their positions on the east side of the Matanikau, the Japanese decided that an attack on the U.S. defenses along the coast would be prohibitively difficult. Thus, after observation of the American defenses around Lunga Point by his staff officers, Hyakutake decided that the main thrust of his planned attack would be from south of Henderson Field. His 2nd Division (augmented by one regiment from 38th Division), under Lieutenant General Masao Maruyama and comprising 7,000 soldiers in three infantry regiments of three battalions each was ordered to march through the jungle and attack the American defenses from the south near the east bank of the Lunga River. The 2nd Division was split into three units; the Left Wing Unit under Major General Yumio Nasu containing the 29th Infantry Regiment, the Right Wing Unit under Major General Kiyotake Kawaguchi consisting of the 230th Infantry Regiment (from the 38th Infantry Division), and the division reserve led by Maruyama comprising the 16th Infantry Regiment. The date of the attack was set for 22 October. To distract the Americans from the planned attack from the south, Hyakutake's heavy artillery plus five battalions of infantry (about 2,900 men) under Major General Tadashi Sumiyoshi were to attack the American defenses from the west along the coastal corridor. The Japanese estimated that there were 10,000 American troops on the island, when in fact there were about 23,000.

At this time, the Lunga perimeter was defended by four American regiments comprising 13 infantry battalions. The 164th Infantry Regiment guarded the easternmost sector. Extending from the 164th south and west across Edson's Ridge to the Lunga River was the 7th Marine Regiment under Colonel Amor L. Sims. Covering the sector west of the Lunga to the coast were the 1st and 5th Marine Regiments. Defending the mouth of the Matanikau for the Americans were two battalions under the command of Lieutenant Colonel William J. McKelvy: the 3rd Battalion, 1st Marines, and the 3rd Battalion, 7th Marines. McKelvy's force was separated from the Lunga perimeter by a gap that was covered by patrols.

== Prelude ==
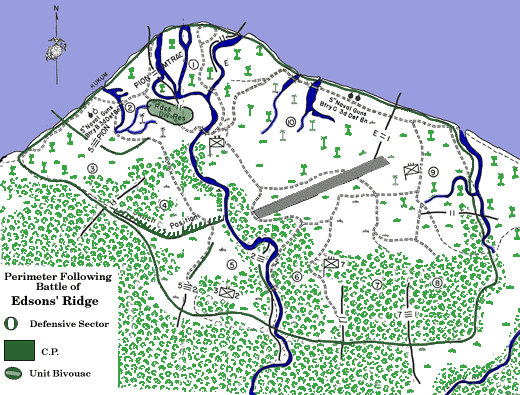
The U.S. Lunga perimeter around Henderson Field in late September 1942 before the arrival of the U.S. 164th Infantry Regiment. The Lunga River runs through the center of the map. The Matanikau River is off the map to the left.

On 12 October, a company of Japanese engineers began to break a trail, called the "Maruyama Road", from the Matanikau towards the southern portion of the U.S. Lunga perimeter. The trail traversed some 15 mi (24 km) of the most difficult terrain on Guadalcanal, including numerous rivers and streams, deep, muddy ravines, steep ridges, and dense jungle. Between 16 and 18 October, the 2nd Division began their march along the Maruyama Road, led by Nasu's unit and followed in order by Kawaguchi and Maruyama. Each soldier had been ordered to carry one artillery shell plus his pack and rifle.

Early on the morning of 20 October, Maruyama reached the Lunga River. Believing that his units were about 4 mi (6.4 km) south of the airfield, he ordered the left and right wing units to advance abreast of each other parallel to the Lunga north towards the American lines and set the time of the attack for 18:00 on 22 October. Maruyama, however, was mistaken. He and his troops were actually 8 mi (13 km) south of the airfield. By the evening of 21 October, it was clear to Maruyama that his units would not be in position to attack the next day, so he postponed the attack to 23 October and put his men on half rations to conserve their dwindling food supply. At nightfall on 22 October, much of the 2nd Division still remained strung out along the Maruyama Road, but Maruyama ruled out any postponement of the attack.

During this time, Sumiyoshi prepared his command to attack the American forces from the west. On 18 October, he began shelling Henderson Field with fifteen 150 mm (5.9 in) howitzers. What remained of the 4th Infantry Regiment under Colonel Nomasu Nakaguma began to gather openly near Point Cruz (on the coast just west of the Matanikau). On 19 October, Colonel Akinosuka Oka led the 1,200 troops of his 124th Infantry Regiment inland across the Matanikau and began moving up the east bank towards high ground east of the river.

On 23 October, Maruyama's forces struggled through the jungle to reach the American lines. Kawaguchi, on his own initiative, began to shift his right wing unit to the east, believing that the American defenses were weaker in that area. Maruyama—through one of his staff officers—ordered Kawaguchi to keep to the original attack plan. When he refused, Kawaguchi was relieved of command and replaced by Colonel Toshinari Shōji, commander of the 230th Infantry Regiment. That evening, after learning that the left and right wing forces were still struggling to reach the American lines, Hyakutake postponed the attack to 19:00 on 24 October. The Americans remained completely unaware of the approach of Maruyama's forces.

On this day, the Japanese 11th Air Fleet under Jinichi Kusaka based at Rabaul sent 16 Mitsubishi G4M2 "Betty" bombers and 28 A6M2 Zero fighters to attack Henderson Field. In response, 24 F4F-4 Wildcats and four P-400 Airacobras from the CAF (Cactus Air Force) rose to meet them, resulting in a large aerial battle. To Allied observers, the Japanese appeared to lose several aircraft in the day's engagements, but their actual losses are unknown. The CAF lost one Wildcat to battle damage but the pilot was uninjured.

U.S. Marine and Army forces were under the overall command of Major General Alexander Vandegrift. However, on the 23rd of October, Vandegrift had flown to Noumea, New Caledonia to meet with Vice Admiral William Halsey Jr., at Halsey's direction. Major General William Rupertus, who was Deputy Commander of the 1st Marine Division, remained in Guadalcanal and commanded the U.S. forces on the ground in Vandegrift's absence.

== Battle ==
=== Nakaguma's attack on the Matanikau ===
Sumiyoshi was informed by Hyakutake's staff of the postponement of the offensive to 24 October, but was unable to contact Nakaguma to inform him of the delay. Thus, at dusk on 23 October, two battalions of Nakaguma's 4th Infantry Regiment and the nine tanks of the 1st Independent Tank Company launched attacks on the U.S. Marine defenses at the mouth of the Matanikau.

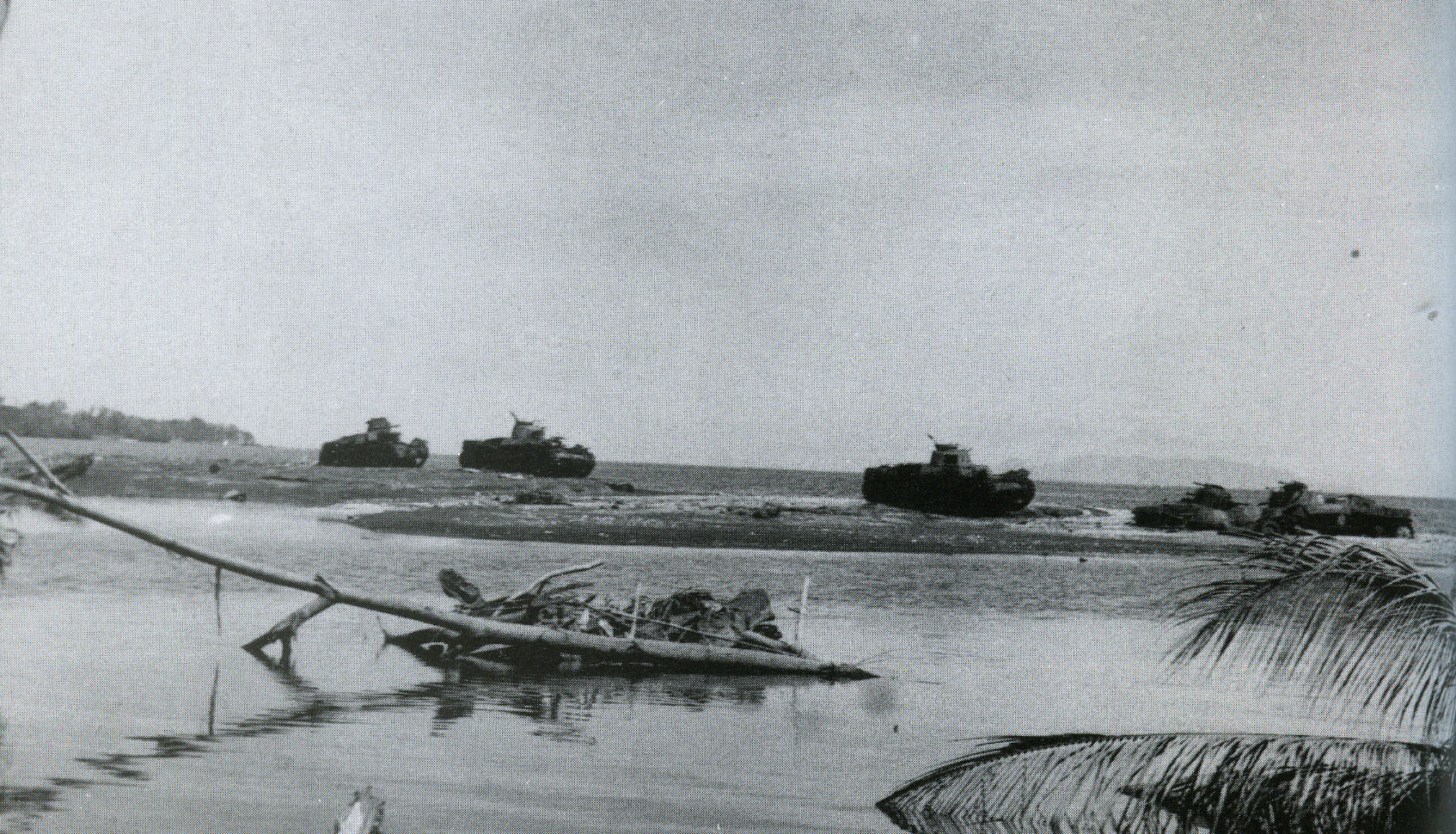
The wreckage of the Japanese 1st Independent Tank Company at the mouth of the Matanikau

Nakaguma's tanks attacked in pairs across the sandbar at the mouth of the Matanikau behind a barrage of artillery. Marine 37 mm (1.46 in) anti-tank guns and artillery quickly destroyed all nine tanks. At the same time, four battalions of Marine artillery, totaling 40 howitzers, fired over 6,000 rounds into the area between Point Cruz and the Matanikau, causing heavy casualties in Nakaguma's infantry battalions as they tried to approach the Marine lines. Nakaguma's attacks ended by 01:15 on 24 October, inflicting only light casualties on the Marines and gaining no ground.

Partly in response to Nakaguma's attacks, on 24 October the 2nd Battalion, 7th Marines under Lieutenant Colonel Herman H. Hanneken deployed to the Matanikau. After Oka's forces were sighted approaching the Marine Matanikau positions from the south, Hanneken's battalion was placed on a ridge facing south which formed a continuous extension of the inland flank of the Marine's horseshoe-shaped Matanikau defenses. A gap, however, still remained between Hanneken's left (east) flank and the main perimeter.

=== Maruyama's first attacks on the perimeter ===
With the redeployment of Hanneken's battalion, the 700 troops of 1st Battalion, 7th Marines under Lieutenant Colonel Chesty Puller were left alone to hold the entire 2,500 yd (2,300 m) line on the southern face of the Lunga perimeter east of the Lunga River. Late on 24 October, Marine patrols detected Maruyama's approaching forces, but it was now too late in the day for the Marines to rearrange their dispositions.

Map of the battle, 23–26 October. Sumiyoshi and Oka attack in the west at the Matanikau (left) while Maruyama's 2nd division attacks the Lunga perimeter from the south (right).

At 14:00 on 24 October, Maruyama's left and right wing units began to deploy for their attacks. Maruyama's troops had very little artillery or mortar support for their upcoming assault, having abandoned most of their heavy cannons along the Maruyama Road. Between 16:00 and 21:00, heavy rain fell, delaying the Japanese approach and causing "chaos" in the Japanese formations, already exhausted from the long march through the jungle. Shoji's right wing force accidentally turned parallel to the Marine lines, and all but one battalion failed to make contact with the Marine defenses. Shoji's 1st Battalion, 230th Infantry Regiment "stumbled" into Puller's lines about 22:00 and were driven off by Puller's men. For unknown reasons, Maruyama's staff then reported to Hyakutake that Shoji's men had overrun Henderson Field. At 00:50 on 25 October, Hyakutake signaled Rabaul that, "A little before 23:00 the Right Wing captured the airfield."

At about this time, Nasu's left wing battalions finally began to reach the Marine defenses. At 00:30 on 25 October, the 11th Company of Nasu's 3rd Battalion under Captain Jiro Katsumata found and attacked Company A of Puller's battalion. Katsumata's attack was impeded by heavy barbed wire in front of the Marine line and then hit heavily by American machine gun, mortar, and artillery fire. By 01:00, the Marine fire had killed most of Katsumata's company.

Further west, the 9th Company of Nasu's 3rd Battalion charged straight into Puller's Company C at 01:15. Within five minutes, a Marine machine gun section led by Sergeant John Basilone killed almost every member of the 9th Company. By 01:25, heavy fire from the Marine divisional artillery was falling into Nasu's troop assembly and approach routes, causing heavy casualties.

Recognizing that a major Japanese attack was underway, Puller requested reinforcement. At 03:45, the 3rd Battalion, 164th Infantry, commanded by Lieutenant Colonel Robert Hall and being held in reserve, was fed piecemeal into Puller's line. In spite of the darkness and intermittent heavy rain, the Army National Guard troops were placed in Puller's defenses before daybreak.

Just before dawn, Colonel Masajiro Furimiya, the commander of the 29th Infantry, with two companies from his 3rd Battalion plus his headquarters staff, was able to penetrate the Marine artillery fire and reach Puller's lines about 03:30. Most of Furimiya's troops were killed during their assault, but about 100 broke through the American defenses and carved a salient 150 yd (140 m) in width and 100 yd (91 m) deep in the center of Puller's line. After sunrise, Furimiya's 2nd Battalion joined in the assault on Puller, but were thrown back. At 07:30, Nasu decided to withdraw most of the remainder of his troops back into the jungle and prepare for another attack that night.

During the day of 25 October, Puller's men attacked and eradicated the salient in their lines and hunted small groups of Japanese infiltrators, killing 104 Japanese soldiers. More than 300 of Maruyama's men in total were killed in their first attacks on the Lunga perimeter. At 04:30, Hyakutake rescinded the message announcing the capture of the airfield, but at 07:00 declared that the results of Maruyama's attack were unknown.

=== Naval and air attacks ===
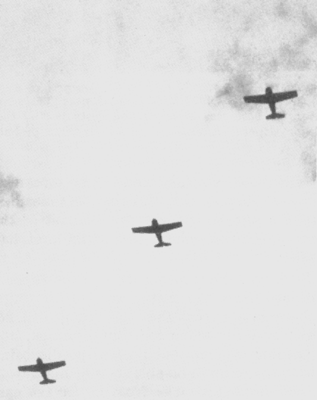
U.S. Marine F4F Wildcat fighters depart Henderson Field to attack Japanese forces.

The Japanese 8th Fleet had task units ready to support the Army's attacks on Guadalcanal. Upon receipt of Hyakutake's message declaring success at 00:50 on 24 October, the task units went into action. The light cruiser Sendai and three destroyers patrolled west of Guadalcanal to interdict any Allied ships that tried to approach the island. A First Assault Unit with three destroyers and a Second Assault Unit with the light cruiser Yura and five destroyers approached Guadalcanal to attack any Allied ships off the island's north or east coast and to provide gunfire support for Hyakutake's forces.

At 10:14, the First Assault Unit arrived off Lunga Point and chased away two old U.S. destroyers converted to minesweepers—Zane and Trever—which were delivering aviation fuel to Henderson Field. The Japanese destroyers then sighted and sank the U.S. tugboat Seminole and patrol boat YP-284 before beginning their bombardment of the U.S. positions around Lunga Point. At 10:53, a Marine shore gun hit and damaged the destroyer Akatsuki, and all three Japanese destroyers withdrew while being strafed by four CAF Wildcat fighters. As the Second Assault Unit approached Guadalcanal through Indispensable Strait, it was attacked by five CAF SBD-3 Dauntless dive bombers. Bomb hits caused heavy damage to Yura, and the unit reversed course to try to escape. More CAF air attacks on Yura throughout the day caused further damage, and the cruiser was abandoned and scuttled at 21:00 that night.

Meanwhile, 82 Japanese bombers and fighters from the 11th Air Fleet and from the aircraft carriers Junyō and Hiyō attacked Henderson Field in six waves throughout the day and were engaged by CAF fighters and Marine anti-aircraft guns. By the end of the day, the Japanese had lost 11 fighters, two bombers, and one reconnaissance aircraft along with most of the aircrews in the downed aircraft. Two CAF fighters were destroyed in the day's fighting but both pilots survived. The Japanese air attacks caused only light damage to Henderson Field and the American defenses. The Americans later referred to this day as "Dugout Sunday" because the continuous Japanese air, naval, and artillery attacks kept many of the Lunga defenders in their foxholes and shelters throughout the day.

=== Maruyama's second attacks on the perimeter ===
Throughout the day of 25 October, the Americans redeployed and improved their defenses against the Japanese attack they were expecting that night. In the west, Hanneken and the 5th Marines closed the gap between their two forces. Along the southern portion of the perimeter, Puller's and Hall's troops disentwined and repositioned. Puller's men fortified the western 1,400 yd (1,300 m) of the sector and the 164th soldiers took the eastern 1,100 yd (1,000 m) segment. The division reserve, the 3rd Battalion, 2nd Marine Regiment was placed directly behind Hall's and Puller's positions.

Maruyama committed his reserve force, the 16th Infantry Regiment, to Nasu's left wing unit. Beginning at 20:00 on 25 October, and extending into the early morning hours of the 26th, the 16th and what remained of Nasu's other units conducted numerous unsuccessful frontal assaults on Puller's and Hall's lines. U.S. Marine and Army rifle, machine gun, mortar, artillery and direct canister fire from 37 mm anti-tank guns "wrought terrible carnage" on Nasu's men. Colonel Toshiro Hiroyasu, the commander of the 16th, and most of his staff as well as four Japanese battalion commanders were killed in the assaults. Nasu was hit by rifle fire and mortally wounded, dying a few hours later. A few small groups of Nasu's men broke through the American defenses, including one led by Colonel Furimiya, but were all hunted down and killed over the next several days. Shoji's right wing units did not participate in the attacks, choosing instead to remain in place to cover Nasu's right flank against a possible attack in that area by U.S. forces that never materialized.

=== Oka's attack ===
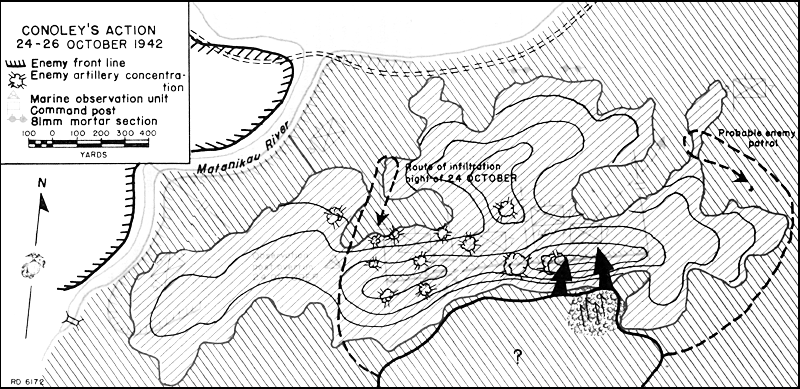
Map of Oka's attacks on the ridge held by Hanneken's battalion

At 03:00 on 26 October, Oka's unit finally reached and attacked the Marine defenses near the Matanikau. Oka's troops assaulted all along an east–west saddle ridge held by Hanneken's battalion but concentrated particularly on Hanneken's Company F, which defended the extreme left flank of the Marine positions on the ridge. A Company F machine gun section under Mitchell Paige killed many of the Japanese attackers, but Japanese fire eventually killed or injured almost all the Marine machine gunners. At 05:00, Oka's 3rd Battalion, 4th Infantry succeeded in scaling the steep slope of the ridge and pushed the surviving members of Company F off the crest.

Responding to the Japanese capture of part of the ridgeline, Major Odell M. Conoley—Hanneken's battalion executive officer—quickly gathered a counterattack unit of 17 men, including communications specialists, messmen, a cook, and a bandsman. Conoley's scratch force was joined by elements of Hanneken's Company G, Company C, and a few unwounded survivors from Company F and attacked the Japanese before they could consolidate their positions on top of the ridge. By 06:00, Conoley's force had pushed the Japanese back off the ridge, effectively ending Oka's attack. The Marines counted 98 Japanese bodies on the ridge and 200 more in the ravine in front of it. Hanneken's unit suffered 14 killed and 32 wounded.

== Aftermath ==
=== Retreat ===
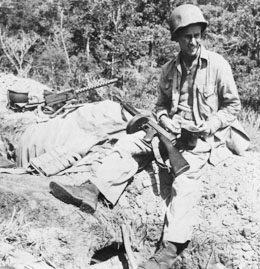
A Marine defender takes a break during a lull in the battle.

At 08:00 on 26 October, Hyakutake called off any further attacks and ordered his forces to retreat. Maruyama's men recovered some of their wounded from near the American lines on the night of 26–27 October, and began to withdraw back into the deep jungle. The Americans recovered and buried or burned as quickly as possible the remains of 1,500 of Maruyama's men left lying in front of Pullers's and Hall's lines. Said one U.S. Army participant, John E. Stannard, of the scene after the battle, "The carnage of the battlefield was a sight that perhaps only the combat infantryman, who has fought at close quarters, could fully comprehend and look upon without a feeling of horror. One soldier, after a walk among the Japanese dead, said to his comrade: 'My God, what a sight. There's dead Japs stretched from the Corner back along the edge of the jungle for a half a mile [800 m].'"

Maruyama's left wing survivors were ordered to retreat back to the area west of the Matanikau River while Shoji's right wing was told to head for Koli Point, east of the Lunga perimeter. The left wing soldiers, who had run out of food several days before, began the retreat on 27 October. During the retreat, many of the Japanese wounded succumbed to their injuries and were buried along the Maruyama road. One of Maruyama's men, Lieutenant Keijiro Minegishi, noted in his diary, "I never dreamed of retreating over the same mountainous trail through the jungle we crossed with such enthusiasm... we haven't eaten in three days and even walking is difficult. On the up hill my body swayed around unable to walk. I must rest every two meters."

Leading elements of the 2nd Division reached the 17th Army headquarters area at Kokumbona, west of the Matanikau on 4 November. The same day, Shoji's unit reached Koli Point and made camp. Decimated by battle deaths, combat injuries, malnutrition, and tropical diseases, the 2nd Division was incapable of further offensive action and would fight as a defensive force for the rest of the campaign. Later in November, U.S. forces drove Shoji's soldiers from Koli Point back to the Kokumbona area, with a battalion-sized Marine patrol attacking and harassing them almost the entire way. Only about 700 of Shoji's original 3,000 men ultimately returned to Kokumbona.

=== Battle of the Santa Cruz Islands ===
At the same time that Hyakutake's troops were attacking the Lunga perimeter, Japanese warships under the overall direction of Isoroku Yamamoto moved into a position near the southern Solomon Islands. From this location, the Japanese naval forces hoped to engage and decisively defeat any Allied (primarily U.S.) naval forces, especially carrier forces, that responded to Hyakutake's ground offensive. Allied naval carrier forces in the area, now under the command of William Halsey, Jr. who had replaced Ghormley, also hoped to meet the Japanese naval forces in battle.

The two opposing carrier forces confronted each other on the morning of October 26, in what became known as the Battle of the Santa Cruz Islands. After an exchange of carrier air attacks, Allied surface ships retreated from the battle area with the loss of one carrier sunk and another heavily damaged. The participating Japanese carrier forces, however, also retreated because of high aircraft and aircrew losses and significant damage to two carriers. This was a tactical victory for the Japanese in terms of ships sunk and damaged, but the loss of veteran aircrews was a long-term strategic advantage for the Allies, whose aircrew losses in the battle were relatively low.

=== Later events ===
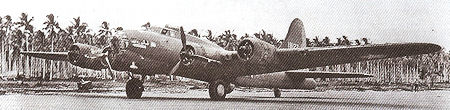
Boeing B-17E 41-9122 (Eager Beavers), 11th Bomb Group, 42d Bomb Squadron, taxiing on two engines at Henderson Field, Guadalcanal in 1943. Captain Frank L. Houx and his crew were lost on 1 February 1943 along with two other 42nd B-17Es: 41-9151 (Captain Earl O. Hall) and 41-2442 "Yokohama Express" (Captain Harold P. Hensley). These were the last three B-17s of the 42nd BS.

Although the Japanese Army's attack on the Allied Lunga perimeter was decisively defeated in this battle, the Japanese were not yet ready to give up the struggle for Guadalcanal. The Japanese Army and navy made immediate plans to move the rest of the 38th Division to the island, along with the 51st Infantry Division, to try a further offensive against Henderson Field in November 1942.

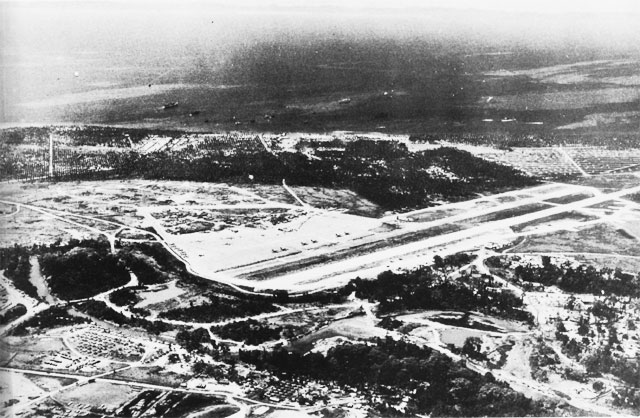
Henderson Field in August 1944 after further development into a major air base

The Japanese again planned to bombard Henderson Field with battleships in order to allow a convoy of transport ships to deliver the 38th's troops and heavy equipment. In contrast, however, to what occurred on 14 October, this time the U.S. Navy moved to intercept the battleship forces sent by Yamamoto from Truk to shell the airfield. During the ensuing Naval Battle of Guadalcanal from 13 to 15 November, Allied naval and air forces turned back two Japanese attempts to bombard Henderson Field and almost completely destroyed the transport convoy carrying the remainder of the 38th Division. After this failure to deliver significant additional troops to the island, the Japanese commanders finally conceded defeat in the battle for Guadalcanal and evacuated most of their surviving troops by the first week of February 1943. Building on their success at Guadalcanal and elsewhere, the Allies continued their island-hopping campaign against Japan, culminating in Japan's surrender and the end of World War II.
