= Akinosuke Oka =

- 岡 明之助
- Born: July 5, 1890; Wakayama Prefecture, Japan
- Died: February 2, 1943 (aged 52)| Guadalcanal, Solomon Islands
- Military career
- Allegiance: Empire of Japan
- Branch: Imperial Japanese Army
- Rank: Major General (posthumous)
- Commands: 124th Infantry Regiment
- Conflicts: World War II; Guadalcanal campaign †

Akinosuke Oka (岡 明之助, Oka Akinosuke; July 5, 1890 – February 2, 1943) was a colonel in the Imperial Japanese Army and a commander of Japanese troops during the strategically significant Guadalcanal campaign in the Pacific theater of World War II. He was posthumously promoted to major general.

== Biography ==
Oka was a native of Wakayama Prefecture and a graduate of the 24th class of the Imperial Japanese Army Academy in 1912. As a lieutenant, he served in the IJA 7th Infantry Regiment, followed by the IJA 77th Infantry Regiment. In 1924, he received specialized training in armored warfare, but remained in the infantry all of his career. He was promoted to major in 1930, lieutenant colonel in 1935 and colonel in March 1939.

In June 1939, Oka became commander of the 4th sector of the 8th Border Patrol Force under the Kwantung Army guarding the Manchukuo border against the Soviet Union. In June 1940, he was assigned command of the IJA 124th Infantry Regiment, which participated in combat operations in the Second Sino-Japanese War. He was then scouted by General Kiyotake Kawaguchi for the proposed invasion of Port Moresby in New Guinea and reassigned to the southwest Pacific front in 1942, landing on Guadalcanal together with the forces commanded by Colonel Kiyonao Ichiki.

Oka commanded a portion of Japanese troops from the 35th Infantry Brigade in a losing effort during the Battle of Edson's Ridge in September, 1942. He later successfully defended the Matanikau River area during the September, 1942 Matanikau action. During the Battle for Henderson Field, he led the 1,200 troops of the 124th Infantry Regiment across the Matanikau and attacked U.S. Marine defenses early on October 26, 1942, but his attack was thrown back with heavy losses to his men, contributing to the overall decisive Japanese defeat in this battle.

At the Battle of Mount Austen, the Galloping Horse, and the Sea Horse in January 1943, Oka and the 1st and 3rd Battalions from the 124th unsuccessfully attempted to defend a terrain feature called the Sea Horse from American attacks. After losing possession of the feature and surrounding areas, Oka and his surviving troops escaped to friendly lines. Japanese records indicate that he was killed soon after this, but some sources suggest he may have been evacuated with the rest of the Japanese forces during Operation Ke and survived the campaign. He was posthumously promoted to the rank of major general.
