= Battle of Lunga Point =

Battle of Lunga Point may refer to:

- Battle for Henderson Field, a land, sea, and air battle that took place October 23 – 26, 1942 during the Guadalcanal Campaign in the Pacific War of World War II.
- Battle of Tassafaronga, a naval battle that took place November 30, 1942 during the Guadalcanal Campaign in the Pacific War of World War II.
