= Masao Maruyama =

Masao Maruyama is the name of:

- Masao Maruyama (Japanese Army officer) (1889–1957), commander in the Imperial Japanese Army during World War II
- Masao Maruyama (scholar) (1914–1996), political theorist and historian
- Masao Maruyama (film producer) (born 1941), producer for animation company Studio Madhouse
