= Masao Maruyama (general) =

Japanese general (1889–1957)

- 丸山 政男
- Born: September 13, 1889; Nagano, Japan
- Died: November 11, 1957 (aged 68)
- Education: Imperial Japanese Army Academy; Army War College
- Military career
- Allegiance: Empire of Japan
- Branch: Imperial Japanese Army
- Service years: 1911–1944
- Rank: Lieutenant General
- Units: Imperial Japanese Army General Staff; Japanese embassy in London
- Commands: 4th Regiment of the Imperial Guards; IJA 6th Infantry Brigade; IJA 2nd Division
- Conflicts: Second Sino-Japanese War; Marco Polo Bridge incident; World War II; Guadalcanal campaign; October Matanikau action; Battle for Henderson Field
- Other work: Military attaché

Masao Maruyama (丸山 政男, Maruyama Masao; 13 September 1889 – 11 November 1957), was a lieutenant general and commander in the Imperial Japanese Army during World War II.

== Biography ==
Maruyama was a native of Nagano Prefecture and a graduate of the 23rd class of the Imperial Japanese Army Academy in 1911 and of the 31st class of the Army War College in 1919. He was a military attaché to the United Kingdom from 1923–1925, and to British India from 1929–1930. On his return to Japan, he was assigned to the Imperial Japanese Army General Staff, in charge of British and American military intelligence. He returned to England from 1934–1935, and was assigned to the Japanese embassy in London.

After his promotion to colonel in 1935, Maruyama returned to the General Staff in Tokyo. From 1937–1938, he was commander of the 4th Regiment of the Imperial Guards. With the start of the Second Sino-Japanese War, he was a field commander during the Marco Polo Bridge incident of July 1937. On 15 July 1938 he was promoted to major general, and assigned command of the IJA 6th Infantry Brigade.

As lieutenant general and commander of the IJA 2nd Division, Maruyama and his division were deployed to Guadalcanal from September and October, 1942 in response to the Allied landings on the island. During the resulting Guadalcanal campaign, Maruyama led troops during the October 1942 Matanikau action and the subsequent Battle for Henderson Field, in which Maruyama's troops were decisively defeated. Maruyama and the survivors of his division were evacuated from Guadalcanal in February 1943. Maruyama remained in command of 2nd Division until the beginning of June 1943, when he was transferred to the Imperial Japanese Army General Staff under Field Marshal Hajime Sugiyama.

Maruyama retired from active duty on 2 March 1944. He died on 11 November 1957.

== Other information ==
=== Books ===
- Fuller, Richard (1992). Shokan: Hirohito's Samurai. London: Arms and Armour Press. ISBN 1-85409-151-4.
- Griffith, Samuel B. (1966) [1963]. The Battle for Guadalcanal (1st ed.). New York: Ballantine Books. OCLC 2362805.
- Rottman, Gordon L. (2005). Duncan Anderson (ed.). Japanese Army in World War II: The South Pacific and New Guinea, 1942–43. Oxford and New York: Osprey. ISBN 1-84176-870-7.

=== Web ===
- Chen, Peter. "Maruyama Masao". WW2 Database.
- Hough, Frank O.; Ludwig, Verle E.; Shaw, Henry I. Jr. "Pearl Harbor to Guadalcanal". History of U.S. Marine Corps Operations in World War II.
- Miller, John Jr. (1949). Guadalcanal: The First Offensive. United States Army In World War II. United States Army Center of Military History. Archived from the original on 2007-12-25.
- Shaw, Henry I. "First Offensive: The Marine Campaign For Guadalcanal". Marines in World War II Commemorative Series.
- Zimmerman, John L. (1949). "The Guadalcanal Campaign". Marines in World War II Historical Monograph.
