= Robert Hall (National Guard officer) =

Robert Kerr Hall
- Born: November 21, 1895; Fargo, North Dakota
- Died: January 1, 1962 (aged 66); Los Angeles, California
- Military career
- Allegiance: United States
- Branch: United States Army
- Rank: Colonel
- Service number: 0-241961
- Commands: 3rd Battalion, 164th Infantry Regiment
- Conflicts: World War II: Battle for Henderson Field
- Awards: Navy Cross; Bronze Star Medal; Purple Heart

Robert Kerr Hall was an officer in the United States North Dakota Army National Guard. He commanded troops during the strategically important Guadalcanal campaign and contributed significantly to the U.S. victory in the Battle for Henderson Field.

== Pre-World War II ==
During the 1930s, as a captain in the part-time National Guard, he was known for his serious attitude towards training. "Hall's experience in WWI impressed the men, as did his serious demeanor and taciturn nature."

== Guadalcanal ==
As a lieutenant colonel, he commanded 3rd Battalion, 164th Infantry during the Battle for Henderson Field in the Guadalcanal Campaign. His regiment, part of the U.S. Army's Americal Division, had only just arrived on Guadalcanal as an emergency reinforcement. In the middle of a dark and rainy night on 24 October 1942, under close combat conditions, he and Lt. Col. Chesty Puller, commander of 1st Battalion, 7th Marines, made the decision to place Hall's men among the understrength Marines rather take their own place on the 7500-ft. line.

Puller and Hall personally placed the soldiers with Marines in existing positions. The soldiers, armed with the new M-1 rifles, added considerable firepower to the Marines, who were armed with the older M1903 Springfield rifles. "With daylight, Puller and Hall reordered the lines, putting (Hall's) 3rd Battalion, 164th into its own positions to Puller's left." Hall's troops were crucial in helping repulse numerous attacks by troops from the Imperial Japanese Army's 2nd Infantry Division. The Japanese defeat in the battle was the last serious attempt by Japanese army troops to retake Henderson Field, an important strategic victory for the United States and its allies. Acting on the recommendation of Puller, First Marine Division commander Alexander Vandegrift awarded Colonel Hall the Navy Cross for his role in the battle. The citation for the medal reads:

The President of the United States of America takes pleasure in presenting the Navy Cross to Lieutenant Colonel Robert "Robin" Kerr Hall (ASN: 0-241961), United States Army, for extraordinary heroism in connection with military operations against an armed enemy while Commanding the 3d Battalion, 164th Infantry Regiment, Americal Division, U.S. Army, in action against the enemy on 24 and 25 October 1942, at Lunga Point, Guadalcanal, Solomon Islands. When a Marine battalion was under heavy attack by overwhelming Japanese forces, Lieutenant Colonel Hall ordered his troops to advance by forced march to their relief, succeeding by his skill and leadership in repulsing a Japanese regiment. The outstanding leadership and gallant actions of Lieutenant Colonel Hall during this action reflect highest credit upon himself and the Armed Forces of the United States.

Hall was wounded on Guadalcanal in November 1942, but recovered to lead his battalion in the final battles for control of the island. He subsequently returned to the states and trained troops in jungle combat. He retired from the army at the end of the war.

== Awards & Decorations ==
Combat Infantryman Badge
Navy Cross
Bronze Star Medal
Purple Heart
Navy Presidential Unit Citation
Mexican Border Service Medal
World War I Victory Medal
American Defense Service Medal
American Campaign Medal
Asiatic-Pacific Campaign Medal with one bronze service star
World War II Victory Medal

== Legacy ==
The command relationship between Hall and Puller and their merged battalion is still studied in military schools. After the battle, the 164th Infantry was informally called "The 164th Marines," and members were welcomed at Marine reunions for many years.

== Sources ==
- The Story of the U.S. Marine Corps, J. Robert Moskin, Paddington Press, 1979
- The Battle for Guadalcanal, Samuel B. Griffith II, Lippincott, 1963
- Marines in World War II Commemorative Series, First Offensive, The Marine Campaign for Guadalcanal, Henry L. Shaw Jr., via Google
- Citizens as Soldiers: A History of the North Dakota National Guard, Jerry Cooper with Glenn Smith, via Google
- They Were Ready: The 164th Infantry in the Pacific War, 1942–1945, Terry L. Shoptaugh, 164th Infantry Association, 2010.
