= Samuel B. Griffith =

United States Marine Corps brigadier general

Samuel B. Griffith II
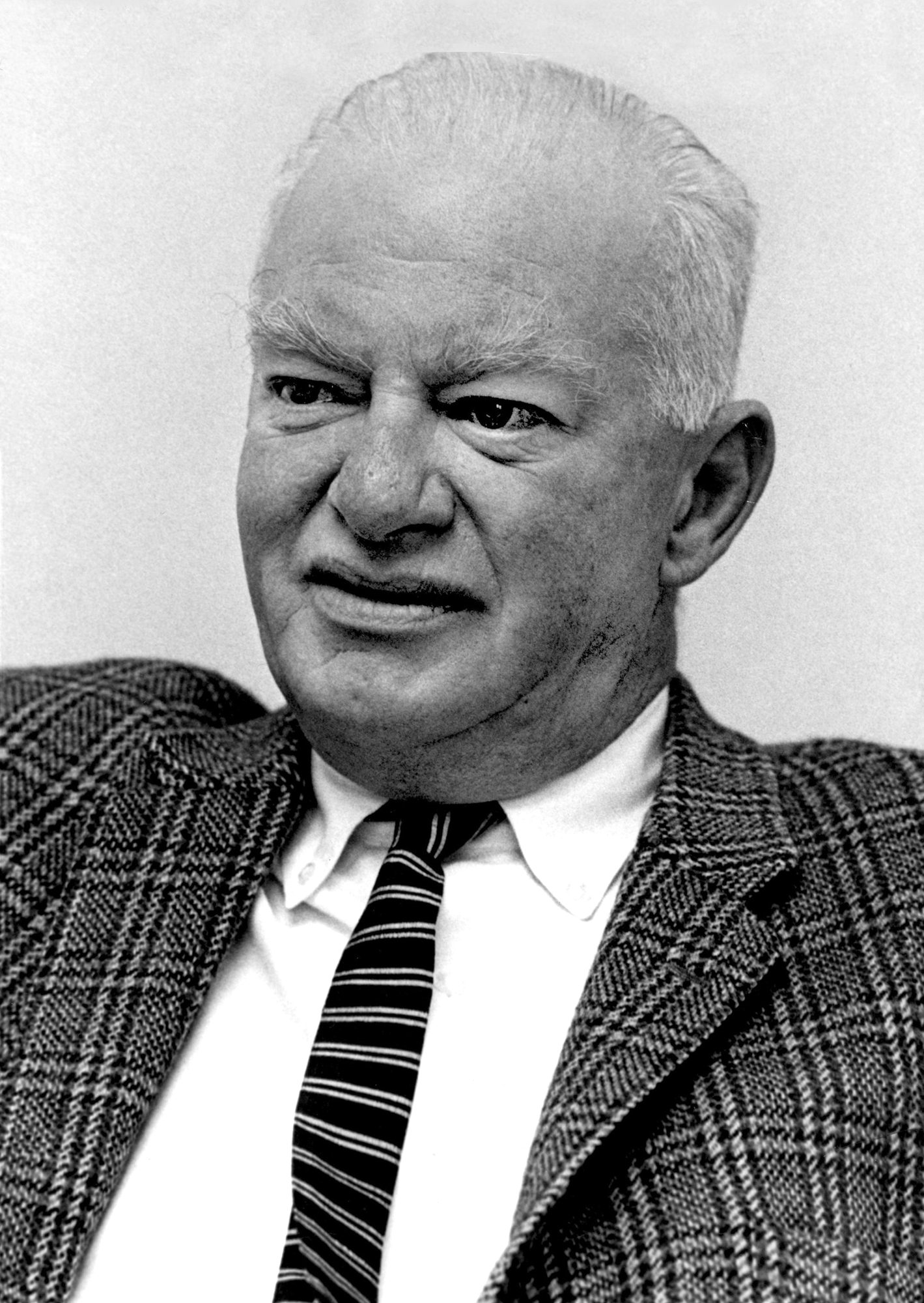
- Born: May 31, 1906; Lewistown, Pennsylvania, U.S.
- Died: March 27, 1983 (aged 76); Newport, Rhode Island, U.S.
- Military career
- Allegiance: United States
- Branch: United States Marine Corps
- Service years: 1929–1956
- Rank: Brigadier general
- Commands: 1st Raider Battalion; 3rd Marine Regiment; U.S. Marine Forces, Qingdao
- Conflicts: Banana Wars; Occupation of Nicaragua; World War II; Guadalcanal campaign; Battle of New Georgia
- Awards: Navy Cross; Distinguished Service Cross; Purple Heart

Samuel Blair Griffith II (May 31, 1906 – March 27, 1983) was a brigadier general in the United States Marine Corps, a decorated combat veteran, and a distinguished scholar of Chinese military history. Griffith is known for his translations of The Art of War by Sun Tzu and On Guerrilla Warfare by Mao Zedong, as well as his combat service. He fought in the Battle of Guadalcanal during World War II, suffered wounds, and became Executive Officer of the 1st Marine Raider Battalion. For his valor on the battlefield, Griffith earned the Navy Cross, the Distinguished Service Cross, and the Purple Heart. After his retirement, he earned a PhD in Chinese Military History from the University of Oxford in 1961.

His academic work is recognized for pioneering Western strategic studies and advancing the understanding of Chinese military thought, with his translations widely disseminated in the required and recommended reading lists of U.S. military staff colleges. His personal papers are regarded by the Marine Corps as valuable primary sources on the history of the branch, the Pacific War, and U.S.-China relations.

Griffith died on March 27, 1983, in Newport, Rhode Island.

== Early life and education ==
Samuel Blair Griffith II was born on May 31, 1906, in Lewistown, Pennsylvania. He spent most of his youth in a suburb of Pittsburgh, where his father was a senior executive officer with the Westinghouse Electric Corporation. His family had a background in law, with his grandfather and great-grandfather being Harvard-educated lawyers. Initially destined for Harvard himself, Griffith became interested in a military career after meeting personnel from the U.S. Naval Academy.

He attended public schools in Pittsburgh and preparatory schools in Pittsburgh and Ilchester, Maryland, before receiving an appointment to the U.S. Naval Academy in 1925. At the academy, he found mathematics to be his "bête noire" while showing aptitude for English, history, and languages. He played on the plebe soccer and lacrosse teams. Upon his graduation on June 6, 1929, with a Bachelor of Science in electrical engineering, he was commissioned as a second lieutenant in the United States Marine Corps. Part of his motivation for joining the Marines was to avoid the mandatory two years at sea required of Navy ensigns, having fallen in love with a girl from Kentucky.

== Military career ==
=== Pre-World War II Service ===
After a brief and unsuccessful attempt at flight training, Griffith attended The Basic School (TBS), a foundational training program for newly commissioned Marine Corps officers, at the Philadelphia Navy Yard in June 1929. Finding his time there "an absolute waste of time," he nevertheless met his tactics instructor, Capt. Merritt A. Edson, under whom he would later serve in combat. He also married Belle Gordon Nelson from Hopkinsville, Kentucky.

From March 1931 to January 1933, after finishing The Basic School, he was assigned to duty with the Guardia Nacional de Nicaragua during the Second Nicaraguan Campaign. Griffith cited how, before being transferred from Quantico to Nicaragua, he managed to get his orders delayed by 10 months after his wife gave birth to his first child. In Nicaragua, Griffith participated in operations against nationalist rebels (or bandidos). With his penchant for languages, he attained sufficient proficiency in Spanish to read Mexican novels, poetry, and Cervantes’ Don Quixote in the original language. Griffith later reflected that many of the tactical lessons from Nicaragua, such as the value of roving or long-range combat patrols, could have been applied "very early" in Vietnam.

In July 1935, following his promotion to first lieutenant in November 1934, Griffith was posted to the American Embassy in Peiping (now Beijing) as a language officer, where he spent three years studying Mandarin Chinese. For the first two years, he received no other official responsibilities aside from receiving six hours of daily Mandarin instruction. Griffith felt that he had first grasped Mandarin after 15 months of instruction. During his time there, he developed a deep appreciation for Chinese culture, citing the people—particularly their "capacity for happiness"—as the most enjoyable part of his experience.

In his final year, following the outbreak of the Second Sino-Japanese War in 1937, and after his promotion to the rank of Captain, he served as a military analyst for the naval attaché, where he observed both Japanese and Chinese forces. He particularly remembered the one-week trip he made to visit Japanese forces in the Shansi province as an observer, was briefed on Japanese operations in Japanese headquarters, and spoke to Chinese prisoners. He also recalled that Evans Carlson had been in China with the 8th Route Army close to where Griffith was stationed. Griffith expressed great admiration for Carlson.

Following his three-year tour as a language student in China, Griffith returned to the United States in July 1938 to attend the Marine Corps Junior Course at Quantico. Upon completion, he was assigned to the 1st Battalion, 5th Marines, participated in experimental boat landing exercises, and trained intensely. In April 1940, an opportunity to return to China as an assistant naval attaché in Chungking was abruptly canceled after Griffith gave a candid and pessimistic assessment of the Chinese Nationalist government's prospects to a senior admiral.

=== World War II ===
In late 1941, Griffith, along with Captain Wallace M. Greene Jr., was sent to the United Kingdom as a special naval observer to study the training and methods of the British Commandos. He and Greene were in Inveraray, Scotland, when they learned of the attack on Pearl Harbor.

Upon returning to the U.S. in the spring of 1942 as a Major, he was requested by Lieutenant Colonel Merritt A. Edson to serve as his executive officer of the newly formed 1st Marine Raider Battalion. Carlson, as the newly appointed commanding officer of the 2nd Raider Battalion, asked that Griffith conduct classes for officers on commando training methods.

The Raiders were an elite unit created for commando-style operations with an organizational structure distinct from other units and the ability for unit command to select their own officers and enlisted personnel. After participating in the selection process for the 1st Marine Raider Battalion, Griffith concluded that "the concept of a selected group, in the end [...] turned out probably unnecessary and undesirable. The Marine Corps simply couldn’t afford it; we were just taking the cream of too many outfits."

Influenced by Carlson's time with the Chinese 8th Route Army, Griffith embraced the Gung Ho ethos, which means "work together," and implemented Carlson's "fire team" concept and structure within the 1st Raider Battalion. Carlson's conception of the "fire team" consisted of dividing ten-man squads into three fire teams of three men each commanded by a squad leader. Griffith believed that squads living, training, and fighting as cohesive units improved morale, discipline, and tactical effectiveness. After the Guadalcanal campaign in 1943, Griffith reorganized the 1st Battalion along those lines.

==== Pacific Theater ====
The 1st Raider Battalion's first combat operation was the assault on Tulagi in the Solomon Islands on August 7, 1942, which was secured after two days of encountering little Japanese resistance. Griffith recalls being surprised by the tenacity of Japanese night attacks. The battalion was then moved to Guadalcanal. On September 12–14, the Raiders defended Henderson Field at the Battle of Edson's Ridge. Following Edson's promotion to lead the 5th Marines, Griffith took command of the Raider Battalion on September 22, 1942. Griffith was promoted to lieutenant colonel in August 1942.

On September 27, during the Guadalcanal campaign and the intense fighting near the Matanikau River, Lt. Colonel Griffith was wounded while leading, as the only field officer, his greatly outnumbered and nearly surrounded battalion, according to his citation. For his "extreme heroism" in this action, he was awarded the Navy Cross and the Purple Heart. After a period of recovery in New Zealand, he underwent thermal bath treatments to regain use of his right arm before rejoining his unit.

Griffith noted the heavy toll that the fighting took on his body and unit. He recalls that he had lost about 25 pounds with everyone in his battalion returning from Guadalcanal "looking like hell."

In July 1943, during the New Georgia campaign, he led his battalion in the attack on an enemy shore battery at Enogai Point. The terrain in New Georgia was even more rugged than on Guadalcanal, with the Marines taking an entire day to cover a single mile. The operation was further complicated by navigational errors, even with local guides, along with the loss of radio communication when a tree fell on their high-power transmitters and two Marines. At one point, Griffith embarked on a two-man forward reconnaissance mission that ran into Japanese machine gunners. Two Marines went missing, and future war hero Harry Liversedge unexpectedly joined the patrol despite earlier stating he would not. Griffith later described the situation as the most terrifying he had ever experienced. Following an engagement at Enogai, the unit successfully captured intact Japanese medium-caliber gun batteries, for which he was awarded the Distinguished Service Cross.

Griffith recalled that trail interdiction, also employed by U.S. forces in the Vietnam War to block enemy supply routes, was futile. If Japanese jungle trails were compromised, they would simply make a new trail.

Following the battalion's withdrawal from New Georgia to Guadalcanal in August, and the toll the battle had taken on Griffith's health, he was sent back to the United States in September after being out of the country for 18-months.

==== Return to the U.S. ====
Following his convalescence, Griffith returned to Quantico to the Candidates’ Class serving as the executive officer before becoming the commanding officer. He contributed major "shakeups" to training programs and became part of a Board that proposed the adoption of a fourteen-man "fire team" composed of three fire teams with four men each, in addition to a squad leader and corporal assistant squad leader.

After this assignment at Quantico, Griffith became commanding officer of the 21st Marine Regiment in 1945, which he described as "ripped to shreds" after combat on Iwo Jima. Aside from reconstituting the regiment in Guam, Griffith was tasked with preparing for Operation Olympic, the planned invasion of Kyushu. At the time, Washington was also considering a plan for a landing on the coast of China south of the Yangtze. Griffith later reflected that the idea of connecting with the Nationalist armies to reach Japan through South China "was certainly a goofy idea […] Holy God."

=== Navy Cross citation ===
Citation:

The president of the United States of America takes pleasure in presenting the Navy Cross to Lieutenant Colonel Samuel B. Griffith, II, USMC.,

"For extraordinary heroism and distinguished service while leading the FIRST Marine Raider Battalion against enemy Japanese forces in the vicinity of Matanikau, Guadalcanal, Solomon Islands, on 27 September 1942. With the only other field officer of the battalion killed that morning, and with his men greatly outnumbered and almost completely surrounded by the enemy, Lieutenant Colonel Griffith moved forward to a position where he could reconnoiter the ground in front of him, in order to effectively employ the troops and weapons under his command. While on this mission, he was painfully wounded by an enemy sniper bullet. Refusing to relinquish command of his troops or leave them without a field officer to control the situation, he returned to his post and personally directed the movements of the battalion throughout the remainder of the afternoon. Later, when relieved by a superior officer, he was finally evacuated to a hospital. By his outstanding leadership, great personal courage, and utter disregard for his own safety in a desperate situation, he maintained the confidence of his subordinate officers and the morale of his troops who fought valorously throughout the remainder of the day."

=== Distinguished Service Cross citation ===
Citation:

By direction of the president, under the provisions of the act of Congress approved 9 July 1918 (Bull. 43, WD, 1918), a Distinguished Service Cross is awarded by the Commanding General, United States Army Forces in the South Pacific Area, to the following-named officer:

Samuel B. Griffith, II, lieutenant colonel, United States Marine Corps, for extraordinary heroism in connection with military operations against an armed enemy while Commanding the FIRST Marine Raider Battalion in the attack on an enemy shore battery at Enogai Point, New Georgia, Solomon Islands, from 7 to 10 July 1943. Colonel Griffith frequently went alone on reconnaissance through areas covered by enemy fire as he skillfully led his battalion in its advance through swamp and dense jungle toward the objective. Although his men had been without food or water for thirty-six hours, his brilliant leadership and courage infused them with fresh energy to deliver paralyzing blows in the final assault during which four naval guns were seized and 350 of the enemy were killed.

=== Post-War Commands and Retirement (1945–1956) ===
Following World War II, Griffith was able to return to China in January 1946 for an 18-month tour. He held a variety of billets following the war, including service on Lt. Gen. Keller E. Rockey’s staff in Tientsin until March 1946. He then joined Adm. Charles M. Cooke Jr.'s staff—commander of the Seventh Fleet at the time—and served as his liaison officer in Nanking, before assuming command of the 3rd Battalion, 4th Marines in August 1946.

Griffith returned to the United States in May 1947 to attend the Naval War College for three years as a staffer, student, and instructor. While he was there, Griffith recalled that the Naval College had emerged from a "degenerated" state into a revitalized institution, thanks to the efforts of Rear Admiral Charles R. Brown and Commander George Miller.

In June 1950, Griffith was reassigned as chief of staff to Troop Training Unit, Amphibious Training Command, led by Gen. Robert H. Pepper, before moving to Fleet Marine Force, Atlantic (FMFLANT) in early September 1951. He trained with Greek and Turkish staff in the Mediterranean, recalling that the tour in Athens and Izmir "was a lot of fun" despite being "always under such terrible pressure" on the job.

Griffith also had special intelligence assignments at Headquarters Marine Corps, working for the CIA and as a deputy of Gen. Lucian Truscott, as a Senior CIA representative in Germany, and as Allan Dulles's deputy. As a Marine, Griffith called the Army officer who famously and successfully led the Anzio operation in 1944 as the "hero" of his 27 years of service.

Samuel B. Griffith retired from the Marine Corps on March 1, 1956, after more than 25 years of service. In recognition of his combat record, he was advanced to the rank of brigadier general following his illustrious combat service.

== Postwar career ==
After retiring from the Marine Corps, Griffith pursued postgraduate studies at Oxford University (New College), earning a Doctor of Philosophy in Chinese military history in 1961 as "the first grandfather ever to be admitted to New College, Oxford as a freshman." His doctoral thesis, "Sun Tzu, First of the Military Philosophers," was a translation of Sun Tzu’s ancient treatise The Art of War. He published a revised version in 1963. Griffith’s translation of The Art of War gained credibility in part due to his own military expertise and a preface by influential British strategist B. H. Liddell Hart. According to the renowned historian Dr. Peter Lorge, Griffith’s pioneering translation decisively cemented the Western understanding of Sun Tzu’s conception of strategy. This interpretation, emphasizing deception, maneuver, and striking at weakness, resembles Liddell Hart’s "indirect approach," an anti-Clausewitzian theory of strategy that rejected the head-on clashes characteristic of World War I trench warfare.

Griffith was also an early translator of Mao Zedong’s writings. In 1941, he produced what was likely the first English translation of Mao’s treatise On Guerrilla Warfare, publishing it in the Marine Corps Gazette that year. This translation was based on an inexpensive Chinese copy of Mao’s writings in China. This early effort suggests a degree of foresight, as in 1941—prior to the United States’ entry into World War II—the Chinese Communists were still relatively little known within the broader context of the Chinese Civil War and the Second World War. As part of his translation, Griffith identified Mao's assertion that "without a political goal, guerrilla warfare must fail" as the most salient and enduring principle of his work. Griffith later reissued it with a new introduction, and it was published as Mao Tse-tung on Guerrilla Warfare in 1961.

Griffith was among the first Western military figures to investigate the connection between Mao's strategic thought and that of the ancient strategist Sun Tzu. He asserted that Mao was "strongly influenced by Sun Tzu’s thought" and that "Red commanders had applied Sun Tzu’s precepts to their operations" well before Mao formalized his own theories.

Among his original works, Griffith's The Battle for Guadalcanal (1963) drew on both American and Japanese sources, incorporating postwar correspondence with former Japanese commanders to present both perspectives on the campaign.

== Other works ==
In his 1961 article for the Marine Corps Gazette, titled "Some Chinese Thoughts on War," Griffith sought to shed light on Chinese military doctrine, which he believed was inadequately analyzed in the West. Despite the significant technological and industrial gap at the time, Griffith cautioned against Western complacency toward China's military capabilities. To provide a framework for understanding, he proposed ten principles that he argued guided Chinese actions: morale, deception, surprise, mobility, timing, disruption, flexibility, concentration, momentum, and freedom of action. He explained that some of these concepts have distinctly Chinese meanings; for example, morale is tied to Confucian ideas of a sovereign's righteousness and the necessity of fighting only "just" wars.

== Legacy ==
According to USMC Maj. Peter Ban, Brig. Gen. Samuel B. Griffith instantiated the warrior-scholar archetype. As a highly decorated Marine who earned a degree from one of the world's most prestigious academic institutions, his most enduring legacy was shaping the field of Chinese military studies in the West. He transformed Sun Tzu's The Art of War from an obscure classic into a staple of military education, with his translations and analyses becoming required or recommended reading at U.S. service academies and staff colleges. Griffith's translation of The Art of War is cited in Marine Corps Doctrinal Publication 1 (MCDP-1), Warfighting.

Griffith was also extensively active in the policy and strategic community, serving as a research fellow in Chinese studies at the Council on Foreign Relations and as a member of the Institute for Defense Studies in London. Griffith lectured widely at institutions such as the Armed Forces Staff College, the United States Military Academy, the Foreign Policy Association, and the Marine Corps Schools. His articles appeared in journals, including Foreign Affairs, Marine Corps Gazette, and U.S. Naval Institute Proceedings, as well as in popular magazines like The New Yorker and Saturday Evening Post.

A significant portion of Griffith's personal archives is preserved in the Personal Papers Collection of the Marine Corps Historical Center, offering enduring insight into most notable Marine Corps operations.

Griffith was a life member of the 1st Marine Raider Association and the 1st Marine Division Association. He died unexpectedly on March 27, 1983, in Newport, Rhode Island.

In 2024, the Samuel B. Griffith Foundation was established to perpetuate the intellectual legacy of Brig. Gen. Griffith. The organization promotes the rigorous study of the People's Liberation Army with the aim of championing the education of active-duty personnel, reservists, and veterans who, regardless of rank or affiliation, are committed to their pursuit of understanding the Chinese military.

== Works ==
=== Books ===
- Griffith, Samuel B. Sun Tzu: The Art of War. Oxford: Oxford University Press, 1963.
- Griffith, Samuel B. The Battle for Guadalcanal, Lippincott, 1963.
- Griffith, Samuel B. Peking and People’s War. New York: Frederick A. Praeger Publishers, 1966.
- Griffith, Samuel B. The Chinese People’s Liberation Army. New York: McGraw-Hill Book Company, 1967.
- Mao Tse-tung. Mao Tse-tung on Guerrilla Warfare, ed. and trans. Samuel B. Griffith. New York: Praeger, 1961.

=== Other Published Works ===
- Griffith, Samuel B. "Some Chinese Thoughts on War," Marine Corps Gazette, April 1961.
- Griffith, Samuel B. "Guerrilla Warfare in China," Marine Corps Gazette, June 1941.
- Griffith, Samuel B. "That Man Suntzu," Marine Corps Gazette, August 1943.
- Griffith, Samuel B. "Show of Force," Marine Corps Gazette, December 1945.
- Griffith, Samuel B. "Action at Enogai: Operations of the First Raider Battalion in the New Georgia Campaign," Marine Corps Gazette, March 1944.
- Griffith, Samuel B. "Corry’s Boys," Marine Corps Gazette, May 1949.
- Griffith, Samuel B. "Guerrilla: Part I," Marine Corps Gazette, July 1950.
- Griffith, Samuel B. "Guerrilla: Part II," Marine Corps Gazette, August 1950.
- Griffith, Samuel B. "Memories and Impressions: Guadalcanal and Tulage, 1978," Marine Corps Gazette, November 1978.
- Griffith, Samuel B. "North China, 1937," Marine Corps Gazette, December 1938.
- Griffith, Samuel B. "Zhukov, Khruschchev and the Red Army," Marine Corps Gazette, November 1958.
- Griffith, Samuel B. "Organization for Guerrilla Hostilities in China," Marine Corps Gazette, July 1941.
- Griffith, Samuel B. "The Glorious Military Thought of Comrade Mao Tse-Tung," Foreign Affairs, July 1964.
- Griffith, Samuel B. "Communist China’s Capacity to Make War," Foreign Affairs, January 1965.

=== Unpublished Writings ===
(Author's Note: These writings are all available at the USMC Archives at the General Alfred M. Gray Marine Corps Research Center.)

- Griffith, Samuel B. "Communist China’s Military Challenge," 1966. There are indications that this paper was published in an August or September 1966 issue of a periodical called DIPLOMAT.
- Griffith, Samuel B. "On Understanding China," date written unknown.
- Griffith, Samuel B. "Sun Tzu and Western Military Thought," date written unknown.
- Griffith, Samuel B. "Mao, China and Asia," May 1968.
- Griffith, Samuel B. New Introduction to Mao Tse-tung, Mao Tse-tung on Guerrilla Warfare, date written unknown.
- Griffith, Samuel B. "West Point Address," circa 1962.
- Griffith, Samuel B. Untitled Work on Guerrilla Warfare, date written unknown.
