= Kokumbona =

Village in Guadalcanal, Solomon Islands

Coordinates: 9°25′38″S 159°54′52″E

Kokumbona (also Kakambona) is a village on the island of Guadalcanal in the Solomon Islands.
