= 4th Infantry Regiment (Imperial Japanese Army) =

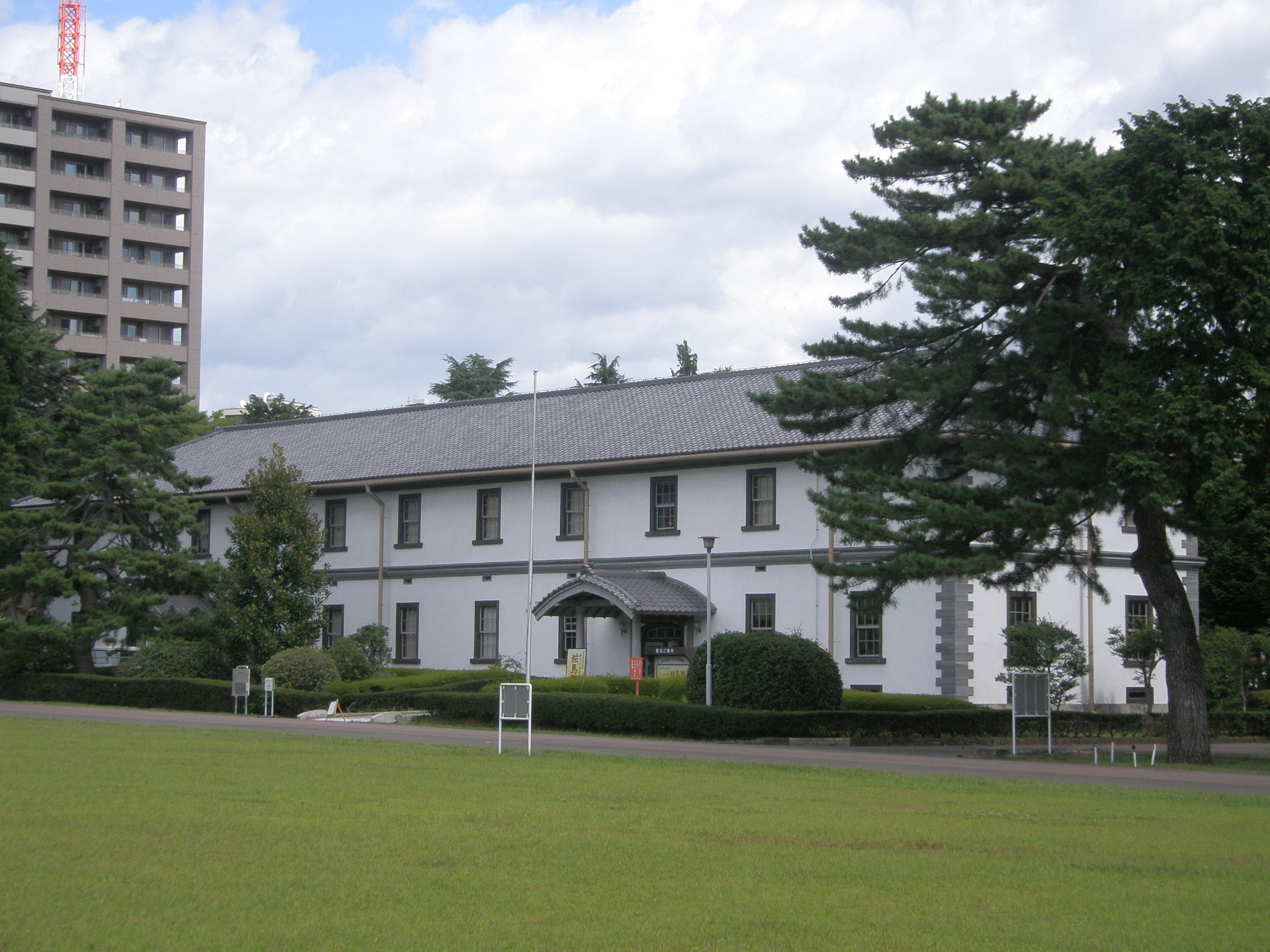
- Former barracks of the 4th Infantry Regiment, now used as a museum.
- Active: 1871-1945
- Country: Japan
- Allegiance: Emperor of Japan
- Branch: Imperial Army of Japan
- Type: infantry
- Part of: 2nd Division (Imperial Japanese Army)
- Garrison/HQ: Sendai
- Engagements: Satsuma Rebellion: First Sino-Japanese War; Russo-Japanese War; South Sakhalin Defense; World War II

The 4th Infantry Regiment was an infantry regiment in the Imperial Japanese Army. The regiment was attached to the 2nd Division. The regiment was raised at Sendai on 9 September 1975. The regiment participated in the Second Sino-Japanese War and The Pacific War.

== Organization ==
- 1st Battalion
- 2nd Battalion
- 3rd Battalion

== Works cited ==
- 加藤宏 (Hiroshi Katō) (12 February 2015). 第二師団と仙台 [The 2nd Division and Sendai]. In 山本和重 (Kazushige Yamamoto) (ed.). 北海道・東北 北の軍隊と軍都 [Hokkaidō and Tōhoku: The Northern Armies and Military Cities]. 地域のなかの軍隊 (in Japanese). Vol. 1. Yoshikawa Kōbunkan. ISBN 9784642064736.
