= Matanikau River =

River on the island of Guadalcanal, Solomon Islands

Coordinates: 9°26′5″S 159°58′1″E

Matanikau
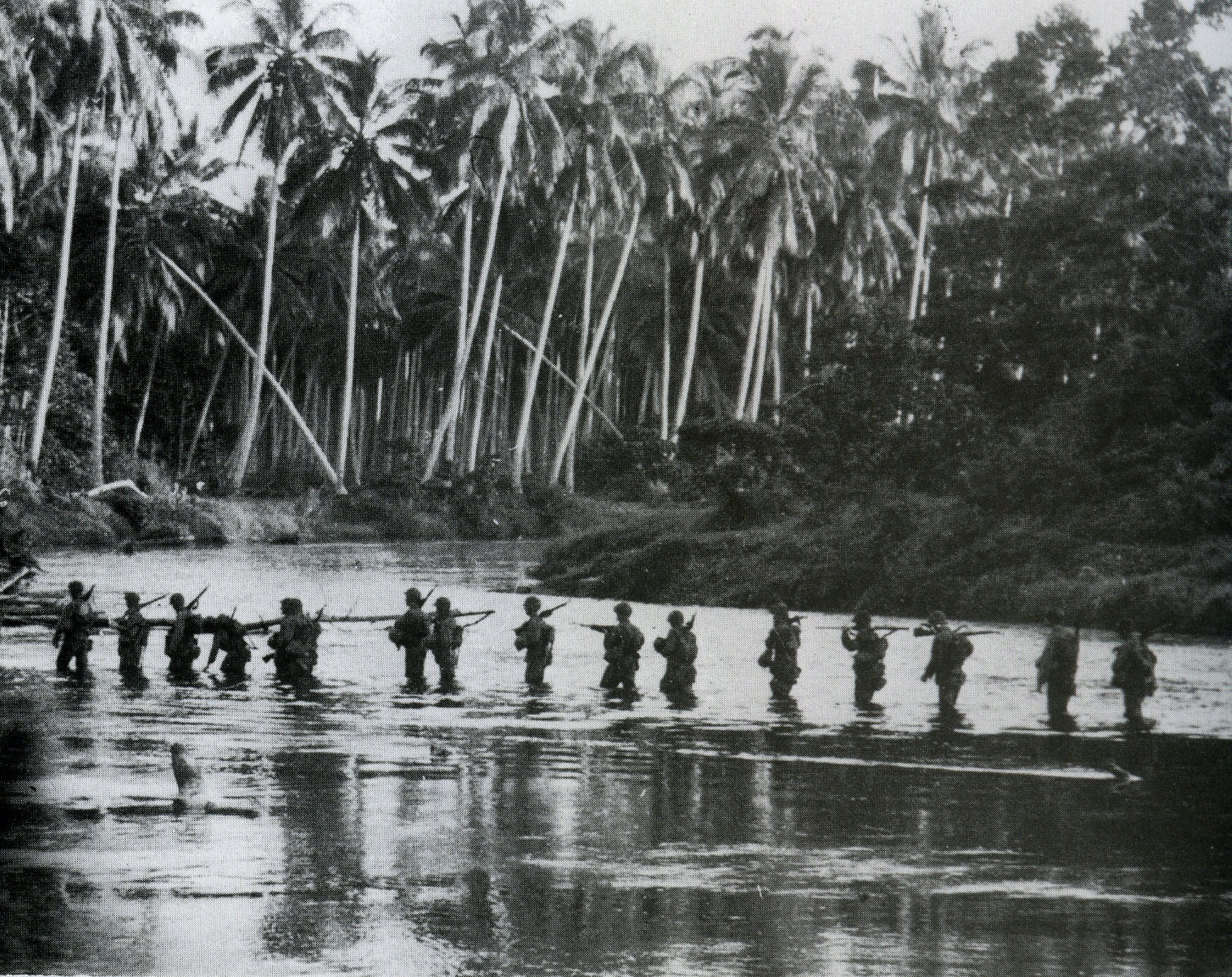
- A U.S. Marine patrol crosses the Lunga River on Guadalcanal in September 1942

Location
- Country: Solomon Islands

Physical characteristics
- Source
  - location: Guadalcanal
- Mouth
  - location: Savo Sound
- Length: 20.5 km (12.7 mi)
- Basin size: 60 km^{2} (23 sq mi)
- Discharge
  - location: mouth

The Matanikau River of Guadalcanal, Solomon Islands, is located in the northwest part of the island. During the World War II Guadalcanal campaign, several significant engagements occurred between United States and Japanese forces near the river.

== History ==
The Matanikau River was the scene of four important battles in the Guadalcanal Campaign of World War II, fought by elements of the United States Marine Corps and the Imperial Japanese Army from 19 August to 9 November 1942.
