= Jacob Pesman =

Jacob Jan Pesman
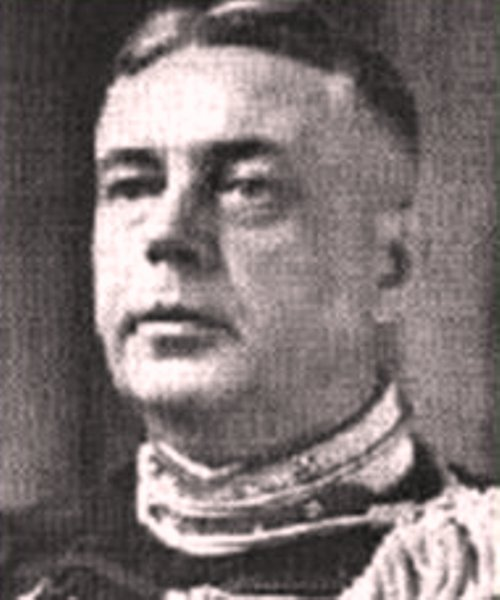
- Born: 4 January 1888; Thesinge, Groningen, Netherlands
- Died: 2 January 1950 (aged 61); Rijswijk, South Holland, Netherlands
- Military career
- Allegiance: Dutch East Indies
- Rank: Major general
- Unit: KNIL
- Conflicts: World War II; Dutch East Indies campaign; Battle of Java; Battle of Kalijati; Battle of Tjiater Pass

Major General Jacob Jan Pesman (4 January 1888 – 2 January 1950) was a Dutch military officer during the Second World War. He was a commander in the KNIL colonial forces of the Dutch East Indies, and was the commander of one of its units during the Japanese invasion of Java.

== Military career ==
Pesman had joined the armed forces by 1910, when he was a second lieutenant, and by July 1939 he had been promoted to major general.

During the Dutch East Indies campaign, Pesman was assigned command of the "Bandung Group" of the KNIL's forces in Java, comprising around 9,000 men. The unit fought in the Battle of Kalijati, in a counterattack attempt to recapture Kalijati Airfield which had been seized by Japanese invaders. The counterattack was heavily hindered by Japanese air superiority and the involved unit suffered significant casualties. The Bandung Group later attempted to check the Japanese advance towards Bandung in the Battle of Tjiater Pass, but failed and the Japanese forces broke through the KNIL defensive lines and captured Lembang.

The day following the fall of Lembang, Pesman met his Japanese counterpart Toshinari Shōji in Isola Hotel, Lembang, and surrendered Bandung. The rest of the Dutch and Allied forces in Java would surrender in the next few days. After his surrender, as a prisoner of war he was transported in late 1942 to Singapore, and later in January 1943 to Taiwan. He was eventually transported to the Mukden POW Camp in Manchuria.

He died on 2 January 1950 in Rijswijk.
