= Carlson's patrol =

WWII anti-Japanese operation in 1942

Coordinates: 9°26′6.33″S 159°57′4.46″E

Carlson's Patrol
- Part of the Pacific Theater of World War II
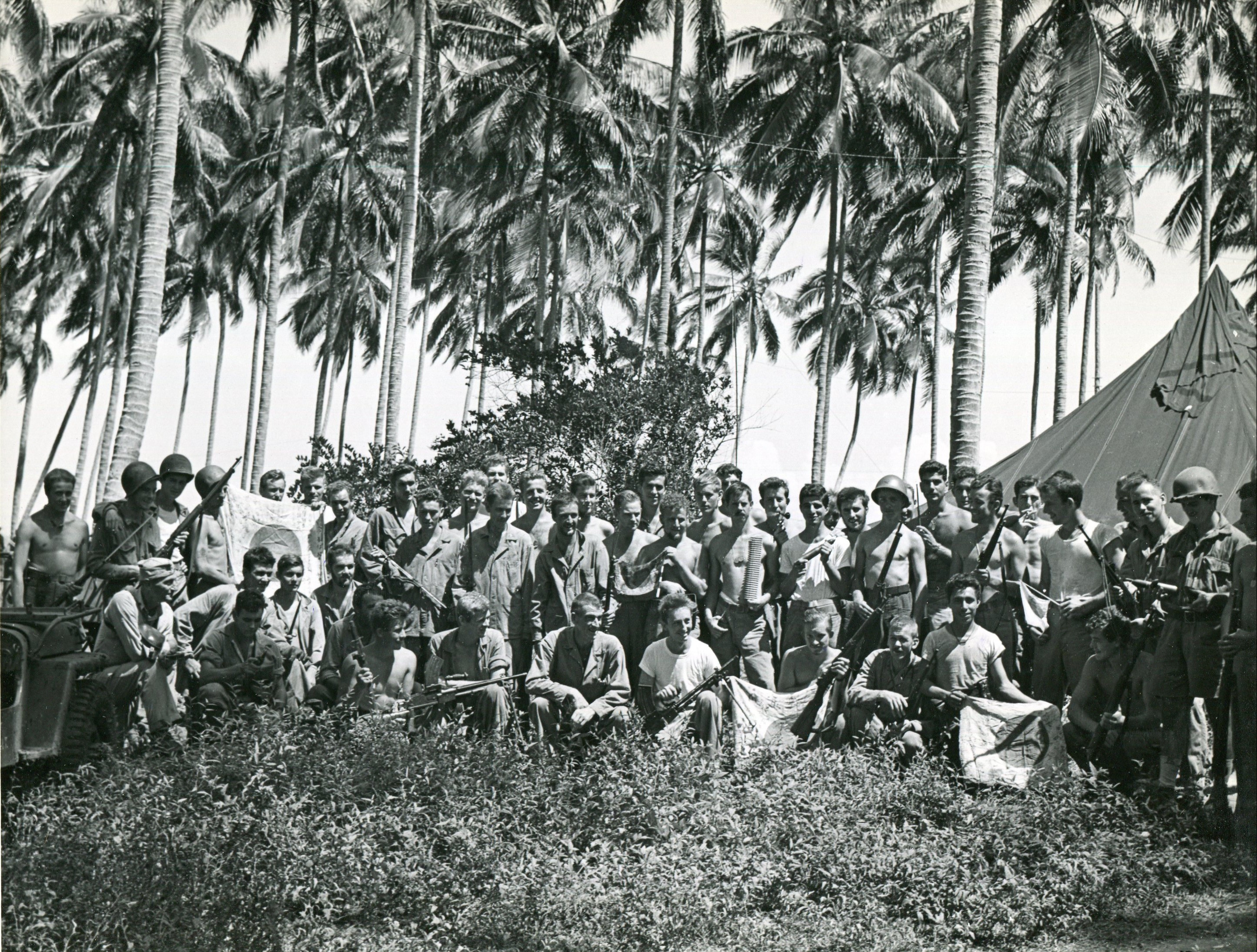
- Carlson and members of the 2nd Marine Raider Battalion with weapons and equipment captured from Japanese forces on Guadalcanal
Date	6 November – 4 December 1942
Location	Guadalcanal in the Solomon Islands
Result	Allied victory

Belligerents
United States; Australia; United Kingdom: Solomon Islands	Japan

Commanders and leaders
Alexander Vandegrift; Evans Carlson	Harukichi Hyakutake; Toshinari Shōji

Strength
700: 2nd Marine Raider Battalion	2,500

Casualties and losses
(United States) 16 killed 17 wounded 225 sick (United Kingdom) 2 wounded	488 killed

Carlson's patrol, also known as The Long Patrol or Carlson's long patrol, was an operation by the 2nd Marine Raider Battalion under the command of Evans Carlson during the Guadalcanal campaign against the Imperial Japanese Army from 6 November to 4 December 1942. In the operation, the 2nd Raiders attacked forces under the command of Toshinari Shōji, which were escaping from an attempted encirclement in the Koli Point area on Guadalcanal and attempting to rejoin other Japanese army units on the opposite side of the U.S. Lunga perimeter.

In a series of small unit engagements over 29 days, the 2nd Raiders killed almost 500 Japanese soldiers while suffering 16 killed, although many were afflicted by disease. The Raiders also captured a Japanese field gun that was harassing Henderson Field, the Allied airfield at Lunga Point on Guadalcanal.

== Background ==
=== Guadalcanal campaign ===
On 7 August 1942, Allied forces (primarily U.S. Marines) landed on Guadalcanal, Tulagi, and Florida Islands in the Solomon Islands. Their mission was to deny the Japanese use of the islands as bases for threatening the supply routes between the U.S. and Australia, and to secure the islands as starting points for a campaign to isolate the major Japanese base at Rabaul while also supporting the Allied New Guinea campaign. The landings initiated the six-month-long Guadalcanal campaign.

The Japanese were taken by surprise, and by nightfall on 8 August the 11,000 Allied troops—under the command of Lieutenant General Alexander Vandegrift—secured Tulagi and nearby small islands as well as an airfield under construction at Lunga Point on Guadalcanal. The Allies later renamed the airfield Henderson Field. To protect the airfield, the U.S. Marines established a perimeter defense around Lunga Point. Additional reinforcements over the next two months increased the number of U.S. troops at Lunga Point to more than 20,000.

In response to the Allied landings on Guadalcanal, the Japanese Imperial General Headquarters assigned the Imperial Japanese Army's 17th Army—a corps-sized command based at Rabaul and under the command of Lieutenant-General Harukichi Hyakutake—with the task of retaking Guadalcanal. Units of the 17th Army began to arrive on Guadalcanal on 19 August to drive Allied forces from the island.

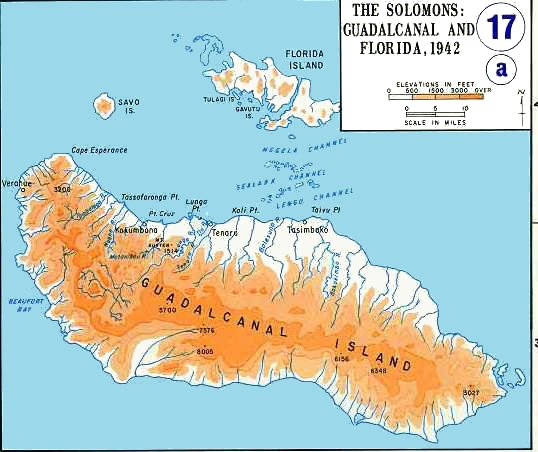
A map of Guadalcanal and nearby islands. The Lunga Point and Koli Point areas are in the north (upper center) of the island.

The first Japanese attempt to recapture Henderson Field failed when a 917-man force was defeated on 21 August in the Battle of the Tenaru. The next attempt took place from 12–14 September, ending in the defeat of the 6,000 soldiers under the command of Major General Kiyotake Kawaguchi at the Battle of Edson's Ridge. Kawaguchi and the surviving Japanese troops then regrouped west of the Matanikau River on Guadalcanal.

=== Battle for Henderson Field ===
Between 1 and 17 October, the Japanese delivered 15,000 troops to Guadalcanal, giving Hyakutake 20,000 total troops to employ for his planned offensive. After his staff officers observed the American defenses around Lunga Point, Hyakutake decided that the main thrust of his planned attack would be from south of Henderson Field. His 2nd Division (augmented by troops from the 38th Division), under Lieutenant General Masao Maruyama was ordered to march through the jungle and attack the American defenses from the south near the east bank of the Lunga River. The 7,000-member 2nd Division was split into three units; the Left Wing Unit under Major General Yumio Nasu containing the 29th Infantry Regiment, the right wing unit under Kawaguchi consisting of troops from the 230th Infantry Regiment (from the 38th Infantry Division), and the division reserve led by Maruyama comprising the 16th Infantry Regiment.

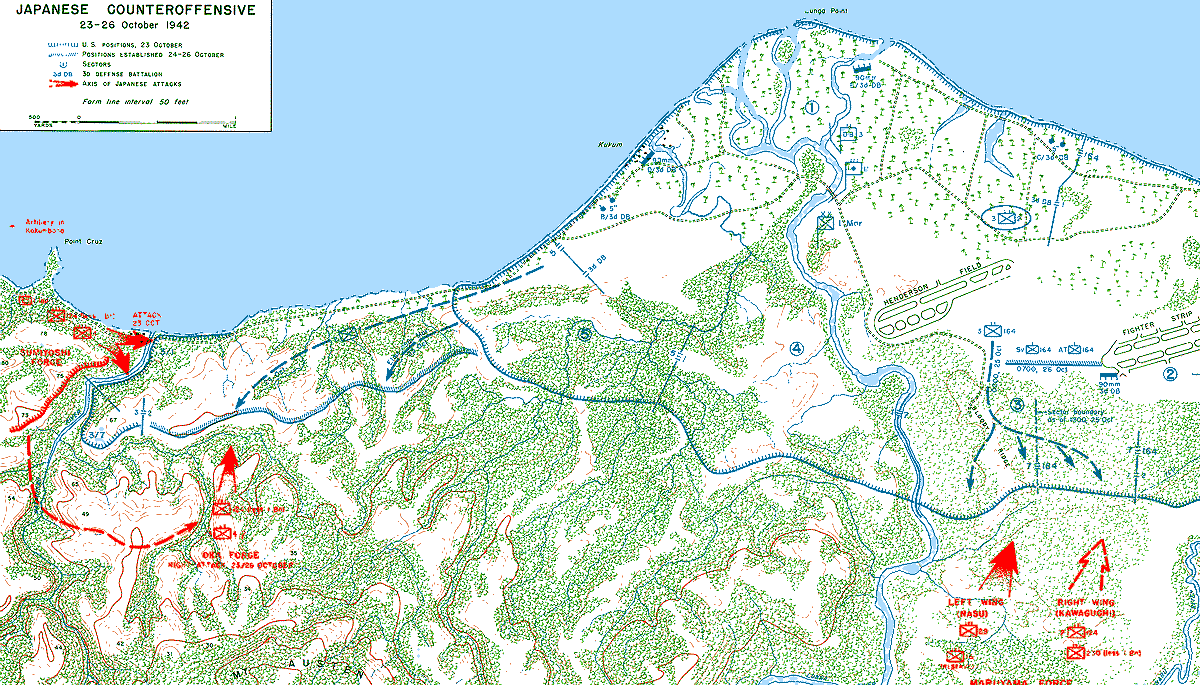
A map of the battle, 23–26 October. While other Japanese forces attack in the west at the Matanikau (left), Maruyama's 2nd division attacks the Lunga perimeter from the south (right)

On 23 October, Maruyama's forces struggled through the jungle to reach the American lines. Kawaguchi—on his own initiative—began to shift his right wing unit to the east, believing that the American defenses were weaker in that area. Maruyama, through one of his staff officers, ordered Kawaguchi to keep to the original attack plan. When he refused, Kawaguchi was relieved of command and replaced by Colonel Toshinari Shōji, commander of the 230th Infantry Regiment. That evening, after learning that the left and right wing forces were still struggling to reach the American lines, Hyakutake postponed the attack to 19:00 on 24 October. The Americans remained unaware of the approach of Maruyama's forces.

Finally, late on 24 October, Maruyama's forces reached the U.S. Lunga perimeter. Over two consecutive nights Maruyama's forces conducted numerous unsuccessful frontal assaults on positions defended by troops of the 1st Battalion, 7th Marines (1/7) under Lieutenant Colonel Chesty Puller and the U.S. Army's 3rd Battalion, 164th Infantry Regiment, commanded by Lieutenant Colonel Robert Hall. U.S. Marine and Army rifle, machine gun, mortar, artillery and direct canister fire from 37 mm (1.46 in) anti-tank guns "wrought terrible carnage" on the Japanese. More than 1,500 of Maruyama's troops were killed in the attacks while the Americans lost about 60 killed. Shōji's right wing units did not participate in the attacks, choosing to remain in place to cover Nasu's right flank against a possible attack in that area by U.S. forces that never materialized.

At 08:00 on 26 October, Hyakutake called off further attacks and ordered his forces to retreat. Maruyama's left wing and division reserve survivors were ordered to retreat back to the Matanikau River area while the right wing unit under Shōji was told to head for Koli Point, 13 mi (21 km) east of the Lunga River. Shōji and his troops began arriving at Koli Point on 3 November.

=== Aola Bay and the Koli Point action ===
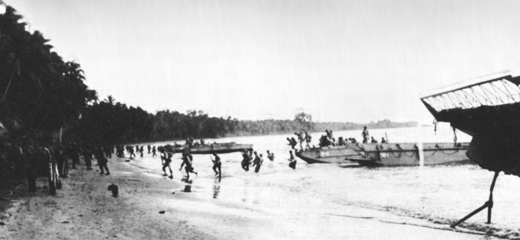
Carlson's Raiders come ashore at Aola Bay on 4 November.

At 05:30 on 4 November, two companies from the 2nd Marine Raider Battalion, commanded by Lieutenant Colonel Evans Carlson, landed by boat at Aola Bay, 40 mi (64 km) east of Lunga Point. Carlson's Raiders—along with troops from the U.S. Army's 147th Infantry Regiment—were to provide security for 500 Seabees as they attempted to construct an airfield. The Aola Bay airfield construction effort had been approved by William Halsey, Jr.—commander of Allied forces in the South Pacific Area—acting on a recommendation by Rear Admiral Richmond K. Turner, U.S. naval commander of amphibious forces for the South Pacific.

The 2nd Marine Raider Battalion was a unique unit in the Marine Corps. The battalion's original organization and tactics were based around Communist Chinese precepts Carlson had witnessed while serving as an observer with the Communists during the Second Sino-Japanese War in 1937-1938. These precepts included promoting equality between officers and enlisted men and making decisions through collective consensus.

Unlike the 1st Marine Raider Battalion which focused on commando tactics, the 2nd Battalion trained to operate as a guerrilla force. The training included an emphasis on infiltration tactics and often involved tactical exercises conducted at night. The battalion was organized into six self-contained rifle companies and a headquarters company. Before landing at Guadalcanal, elements of the battalion had seen action as part of the garrison of Midway Atoll during the Battle of Midway in May 1942 and the near disastrous Makin Island raid in August.

In early November, Vandegrift, fearing that the Japanese were planning an assault on the Lunga perimeter from the east using Shōji's forces plus additional reinforcements, launched an operation against the Japanese units at Koli Point. Beginning on 4 November, two battalions of U.S. Marines and two battalions of U.S. Army troops attacked and attempted to encircle Shōji's men at Gavaga Creek near the village of Tetere in the Koli Point area.

As the American troops were attempting to destroy Shōji's force, Vandegrift ordered Carlson's Raiders to march overland from Aola Bay toward Koli Point to cut off any of Shōji's forces that escaped the encirclement attempt. On 5 November, two transport ships headed for Espiritu Santo to pick up three companies from Carlson's battalion while Carlson prepared his two companies already on Guadalcanal to march overland towards Koli Point. Carlson arranged for rear echelon personnel at Aola to resupply his patrol with rations every four days at a prearranged point on the coast. A patrol with native carriers would meet the boat and carry supplies inland to Carlson's patrol base.

== Patrol ==
=== Initial actions ===
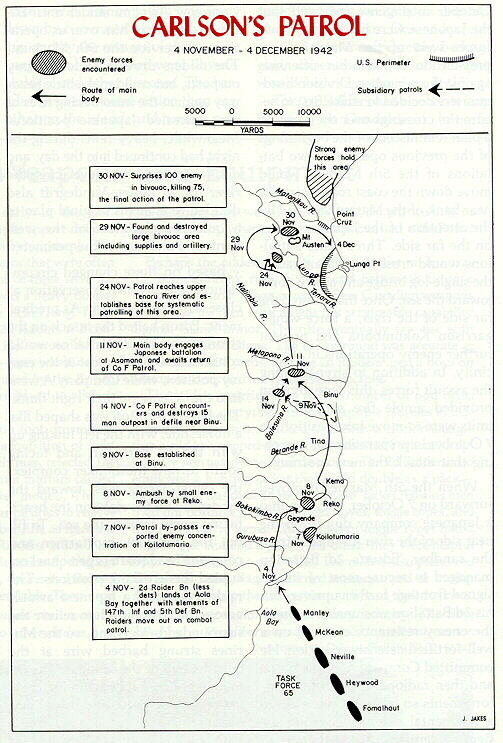
A map of Carlson's patrol, from Aola to the Lunga perimeter

At first light on 6 November, Carlson and his command group, two of his companies, and a group of native scouts and carriers commanded by Major John Mather of the Australian Army and Sergeant Major Jacob C. Vouza of the Solomon Islands Police Force set out from Aola on the patrol. The group marched along a jungle trail northwest to the Reko River, arriving on 7 November. At the Reko, Carlson learned that the local Christian mission had recently been raided by Japanese troops, who had killed two of the missionaries before moving west.

Pushing across the river with one platoon of troops, Carlson encountered a small group of Japanese who shot and severely wounded the native scout leading the Marine column. Returning fire, the Marines killed two Japanese soldiers and drove off another three or four. Carlson's main body then arrived, and the column bivouacked for the night.

On 8 November, the column continued through the jungle to the northwest, striking the coast at the Kena River, and made camp at the village of Tasimboko, 15 mi (24 km) from Aola Bay. The next day they crossed the Berande and Balasuna rivers and reached the village of Binu—10 mi (16 km) southwest of Tasimboko—in the afternoon. At Binu, about 3 mi (4.8 km) southeast of Koli Point, Carlson established his base camp and prepared to block the movement of any Japanese forces from Koli to the east and south.

The other three Raider companies arrived at Aola on 8 November. On 9 November, they moved by landing craft to Tasimboko and on 10 November marched overland—guided by native scouts—toward Binu. On the way, the Raiders encountered a small group of Japanese soldiers and killed three of them. before arriving at Binu in the afternoon of the same day.

In the meantime, Hyakutake ordered Shōji to abandon his positions at Koli and rejoin Japanese forces at Kokumbona in the Matanikau area. Although American forces had almost completely encircled Shōji's troops along Gavaga Creek at Koli, a gap existed by way of a swampy creek in the southern side of the American lines. Taking advantage of this route, Shōji's men began to escape. The Americans closed the gap in their lines on 11 November. By then, Shōji and between 2,000 and 3,000 of his men had escaped into the jungle to the south.

On 11 November, Carlson sent four of his battalion's companies—"C", "D", "E", and "F"—to fan out and patrol the area to the north and west of Binu. The remaining company, "B", stayed behind to provide security for the Binu base camp. At 10:00, Company C, which had marched directly west toward the village of Asamana, encountered a large body of Shōji's troops camped near the Metapona River. Company C was quickly pinned down by rifle, machinegun, and mortar fire. Carlson responded by directing Companies D and E to come to C's aid, attacking the Japanese forces from two different directions.

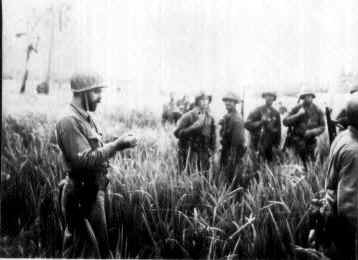
A Marine officer briefs Raider troops during the patrol

As Companies D and E moved in C's direction, both encountered large concentrations of Shōji's soldiers and by 12:30 were involved in intense firefights. At 15:00, Company D commander Captain Charles McAuliffe—with nine of his men—unexpectedly marched into the Binu base camp. McAuliffe reported to Carlson that soon after he had made contact with the Japanese forces, he and one of his squads had become cut off from the rest of his company. After extricating themselves with difficulty, McAuliffe and the men with him had decided to retreat back to the base camp. McAuliffe reported that as far as he knew the rest of his company had been annihilated. A short time later, however, the rest of D Company arrived at the base camp, led by Gunnery Sergeant George Schrier, after successfully disengaging from the firefight. Carlson summarily relieved McAuliffe for what he later described as "total ineptitude for leadership in battle" and placed Captain Joe Griffith in command of Company D.

Along with Company F, which had returned to the base camp, Carlson proceeded to the area where Company C was engaged, arriving at 16:30. Carlson ordered Company F to attack the Japanese positions facing Company C at 17:15. In the meantime, the Japanese troops departed the area, which Company F soon confirmed. Leaving Company F at the scene, Carlson returned to Binu with Company C, arriving at 22:00. Company E arrived at Binu about the same time and reported that they had caught a Japanese company crossing a river in the open and killed many of them before withdrawing. Carlson then took Company B and returned to the area that Company F was guarding, arriving at daybreak on 12 November. The Marines had suffered 10 killed in the day's actions and estimated that they had killed 120 Japanese soldiers.

Carlson and the two companies, with Company B leading, marched west towards the village of Asamana on the Metapona River. While crossing the river, the Marines captured two Japanese soldiers and killed a third who happened by in a native boat. They then attacked and occupied Asamana, surprising and killing several Japanese soldiers in the village. Signs in Japanese in the village indicated that it was being used as a rallying location for Shōji's forces. Occupying defensive positions around the village and river crossing, the Raiders killed 25 Japanese soldiers that approached the village during the remainder of the day.

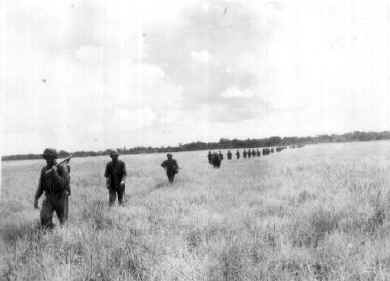
Carlson's Raiders cross an open field during the patrol

The next day, when a company-sized column of Japanese soldiers approached Asamana, the Raiders called in 75 mm (2.95 in) artillery fire from the 1st Battalion, 10th Marine Regiment, killing many of the Japanese and causing the rest to scatter and retreat away from the village. Carlson and the Marines with him returned to Binu on 14 November to rest and reprovision. In the same day, a patrol from Company F wiped out a 15-man Japanese encampment discovered by the native scouts.

On 15 November, Carlson moved the base camp from Binu to Asamana. By this time, Shōji's units were no longer in the area, having continued their march deep into the interior of Guadalcanal en route to the Matanikau. Raider patrols around Asamana over the next two days found and killed a few scattered Japanese stragglers.

=== New mission ===
Carlson's battalion was ordered to move to the upper Tenaru River and patrol around the Lunga River—south of the Lunga perimeter—to locate the trail the Japanese had used to position their men and materiel for their assaults during the Battle for Henderson Field. Carlson's Raiders were also to seek out and destroy several Japanese artillery pieces that had been delivering harassing fire against Henderson Field for several weeks. The Raiders set up a base camp about 2 mi (3.2 km) southeast of the Lunga perimeter on 20 November and rested and replenished until 24 November.

On 25 November, Carlson's Company A arrived from Espiritu Santo and joined the Raiders. On 27 November, the battalion relocated 4 mi (6.4 km) further up the Tenaru River and established two auxiliary patrol bases 2 mi (3.2 km) upstream and downstream, respectively.

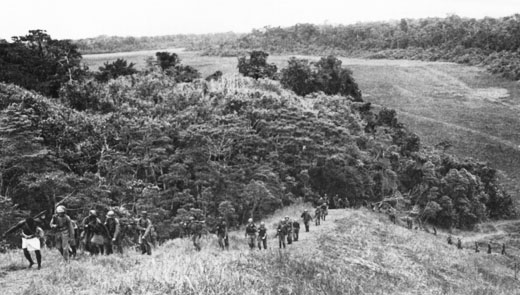
Native Solomon Islanders guide US 2nd Marine Raiders in pursuit of Japanese forces on Guadalcanal in November 1942

On 28 November, Companies B and D patrolled across the Lunga River and bivouacked in the Mount Austen area, southwest of the Lunga perimeter. The same day, Companies A and F patrolled further south between the Lunga and the Tenaru. On 30 November, the Raiders found a Japanese 75 mm mountain gun and 37 mm (1.46 in) anti-tank gun emplaced on a ridge about 4 mi (6.4 km) south of the Lunga perimeter. As one squad of six Marines from Company F patrolled near where the guns were discovered, they entered a hidden Japanese camp and found themselves among about 100 Japanese soldiers resting under shelters with their weapons stacked around trees in the center of the camp. In the resulting melee, the Raider squad killed about 75 of the Japanese. The rest escaped.

The Raiders rested on 1 December and received some provisions by airdrop. On 2 December, Carlson fanned out his patrols around the Lunga River. Company B discovered 10 Japanese camped by the river and killed all of them. None of the other companies encountered any Japanese, but one discovered another 75 mm mountain gun. Late in the day, Carlson received orders to terminate the patrol and take his troops into the Lunga perimeter the next day.

On 3 December, Carlson sent Companies C, D, and E east towards the Tenaru river while Companies A, B, and F headed west towards Mount Austen. Companies C, D, and E reached the lower Tenaru and entered friendly lines at Lunga Point without incident. Companies A, B, and F, however, encountered a Japanese patrol near the summit of Mount Austen. In a close-quarters fight in the jungle, 25 Japanese were killed and four Marines were seriously wounded, one of whom died later.

The next day, Companies A, B, and F set out with the intention of entering the Lunga perimeter near the Matanikau River. Along the way, the Marine column was ambushed by a Japanese machinegun team that killed four Raiders. Seven Japanese were killed in this skirmish. The patrol encountered no further opposition and entered friendly lines at Lunga Point by mid-afternoon.

== Aftermath ==
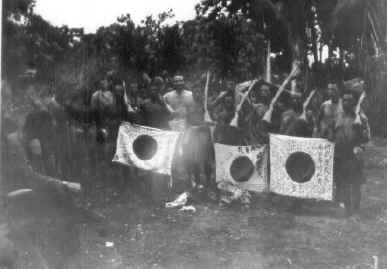
Solomon Island native scouts display Japanese weapons and flags captured during the patrol

As Carlson's battalion was ending its patrol, Shōji and his surviving troops were reaching friendly positions west of the Matanikau. In addition to the losses sustained from attacks by Carlson's Raiders, a lack of food and tropical diseases felled many more of Shōji's men. By the time Shōji's forces reached the Lunga River in mid-November, about halfway to the Matanikau, only 1,300 men remained with the main body. When Shōji reached the 17th Army positions west of the Matanikau, only 700-800 survivors were still with him. Survivors from Shōji's force later participated in the Battle of Mount Austen, the Galloping Horse, and the Sea Horse in December 1942 and January 1943.

During the 29 days of the patrol, Carlson's Raiders hiked approximately 150 mi (240 km) to cover a straight-line distance of about 40 mi (64 km) from Aola Bay to the Matanikau River. Carlson claimed that his troops killed 488 Japanese soldiers and captured or destroyed large amounts of equipment, including two howitzers and various small arms and ammunition.

The 2nd Raiders suffered 16 killed and 17 wounded, plus 2 wounded native guides. Non-battle casualties totaled 225, of which 125 suffered from malaria, 29 from dysentery, and 71 from ringworm or jungle rot. Most of the remaining Raiders were also suffering some type of physical ailment. On 17 December, the Raiders departed Guadalcanal by ship and arrived back at their home camp on Espiritu Santo on 20 December. At Espiritu Santo, the unit continued to be affected by the lingering tropical diseases many had contracted during the Guadalcanal patrol.

In the second week of March 1943, the 2nd Raiders were declared unfit for combat duty, although this finding was never announced in an official document. The 2nd Marine Raiders did not participate again as a unit in a combat operation, until the Bougainville campaign beginning on 1 November 1943. In spite of the high fallout from disease, Carlson's troops generally felt that they had performed well as a unit during the patrol and had accomplished their mission.

Lieutenant Cleland E. Early of Company E described the long Guadalcanal patrol and the effect on his unit: "Enduring the living conditions was worse than the combat. My platoon went in with 30 men, one corpsman and one officer. When we came out we had one officer, one corpsman, and 18 enlisted, all of whom had malaria, worms, diarrhea, jungle rot and high morale.
