= Nakajima Ki-49 Donryū =

Bomber aircraft in Japan

Ki-49 Donryū
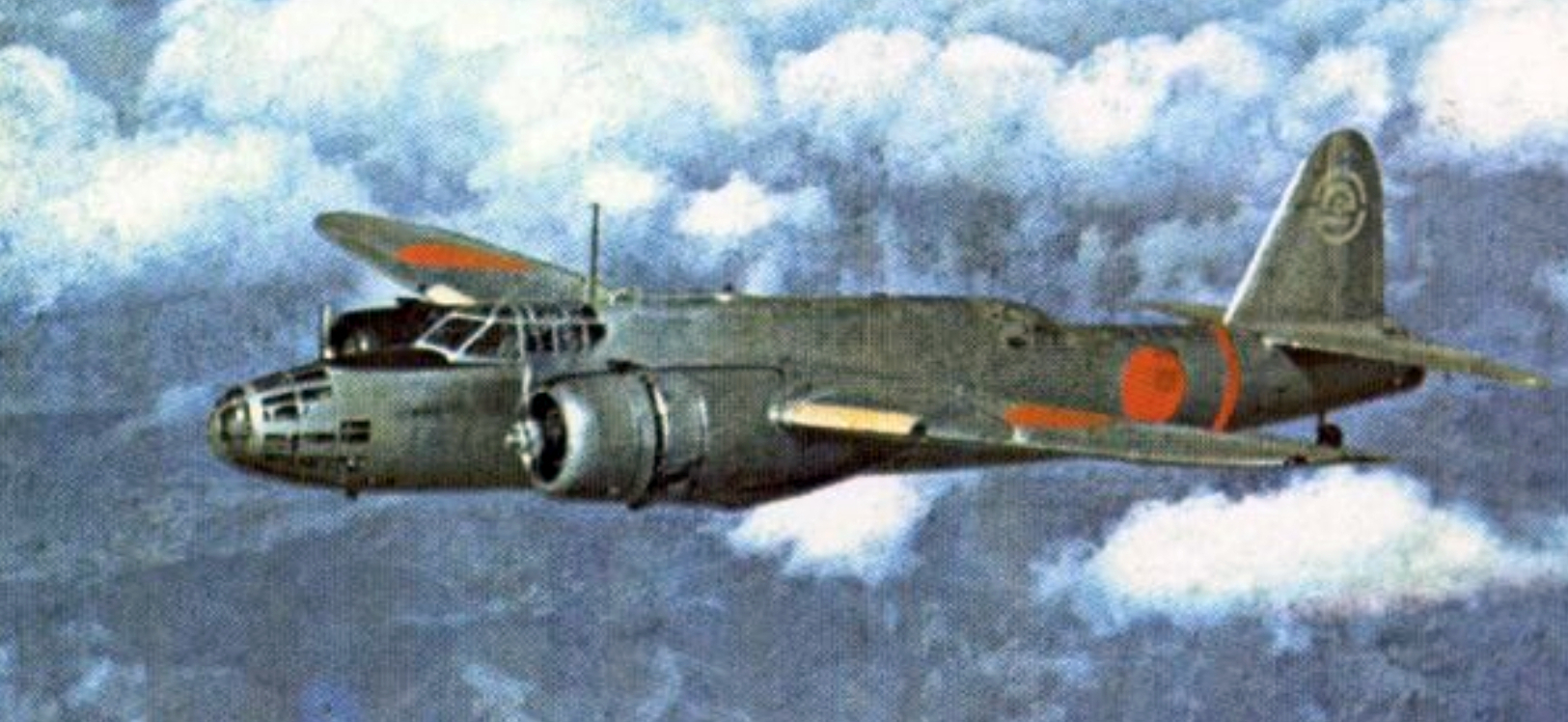

General information
- Type: Heavy bomber
- National origin: Japan
- Manufacturer: Nakajima Aircraft Company
- Designer: Yasushi Koyama
- Status: Retired
- Primary users: Imperial Japanese Army Air Service Indonesian Air Force
- Number built: 819

History
- Manufactured: 1941–1944
- Introduction date: 1941
- First flight: August 1939
- Retired: 1945

The Nakajima Ki-49 Donryū (呑龍, "Storm Dragon") was a twin-engine heavy bomber designed and produced by the Japanese aviation manufacturer Nakajima Aircraft Company. Operated by the Imperial Japanese Army Air Service (IJAAS) as the Army Type 100 Heavy Bomber Model 1, it was known to the Allied by the reporting name "Helen".

The design of the Ki-49 was greatly shaped by a forerunning bomber operated by the IJAAS, the Mitsubishi Ki-21. Specifically, officials came to recognise that, no matter how advanced the Ki-21 may have been at the time of its introduction, it would not be long before the bomber would be unable to operate without support from friendly fighters. Accordingly, in 1938, a specification for a replacement bomber was issued, which stipulated that such an aircraft should have the speed and defensive weaponry to enable it to operate independently, even during daylight bombing missions, without the protection of escort fighters. Consequently, the Ki-49 was furnished with formidable defensive armament and armor, although these features restricted the Ki-49 to payloads comparable to those of lighter medium bombers – the initial production variant could carry only 1,000 kg (2,200 lb) of bombs. A mid-wing, cantilever monoplane of all-metal construction, the Ki-49 was one of the first Japanese aircraft fitted with a retractable tailwheel and a tail turret.

Performing its maiden flight in August 1939, the type was introduced to service two years later and made it combat debut during the Second Sino-Japanese War. Upon Japan's entry into World War II, the Ki-49 became a staple of the Pacific War, being active in the New Guinea and conducting numerous air raids against Australia. Improved versions of the aircraft were introduced during the conflict, such as the up-engined Army Type 100 Heavy Bomber Model 2. It was active during Battle of the Philippines up to December 1944, at which point most surviving Ki-49s were used to conduct kamikaze attacks the advancing Allied forces. Production of the Ki-49 was terminated in December 1944.

== Development ==
The origins of the Ki-49 can be traced back to the issuing of a specification in 1938 for a replacement to the Mitsubishi Ki-21 ("Sally"), which was introduced to service with the Imperial Japanese Army Air Service (IJAAS) that same year. This specification called for a bomber that had sufficient speed and armament to not be reliant upon escorting fighter for its defence. Specific performance criteria included a maximum speed of at least 500 kmph (311 mph), a range of 3,000 km (1,864 miles), a bombload of 1,000 kg (2,200 lb) (2,205 lb), and multiple flexibly-mounted machine guns for self-defence, including at least one in the tail. Furthermore, the envisioned aircraft was also to have sufficient protection from enemy fire; this included the incorporation of self-sealing fuel tanks.

In Summer 1938, Nakajima Aircraft Company assembled a design team that included multiple of its senior engineers to produce its response. During the procurement of the Ki-21, the company had received valuable information on the Mitsubishi aircraft, and made use of this data in their design process. The defensive armament consisted of one 20 mm Ho-1 cannon installed within a dorsal turret, and several 7.7 mm Type 89 machine guns located in the aircraft's nose, ventral, port, and starboard positions as well as in a tail turret; the latter was a novel feature for the IJAAS at the time of its introduction. A single bomb bay was contained within the fuselage, which was almost as long as the centre-section of the wing.

One key area of focus during the design process was the aircraft's handling characteristics; this contributed to the selection of a mid-wing configuration that had an atypically low aspect ratio that was both relatively stable and provided for favourable manoeuvrability when flown at medium or low altitudes. This wing's centre-section had a wider chord than the outer sections, the internal volume of which was used to accomidate a total of six self-sealing fuel tanks. Other attributes of the wing included its relatively low drag properties and the positioning of the Fowler flaps well aft of the engine nacelles. An additional pair of fuel tanks, as well as a single oil tank, were located within each of the outer wing sections.

In August 1939, the first prototype performed its maiden flight; this aircraft would be largely used for handling trials, during which positive feedback was received from service pilots. An additional two prototypes and seven pre-production aircraft would be procured. While the first prototype was powered by a pair of 708 kW (949 hp) Nakajima Ha-5 KA-I radial engines, the next two prototypes were outfitted with the 932 kW (1,250 hp) Nakajima Ha-41 engines that were intended for the production version. The pre-production aircraft, which were almost identical to the latter pair of prototypes aside from the fitting of constant-speed three-bladed propellers, were completed during 1940 and underwent an extensive flight testing process, which involved only minor changes in armament, protection, and seating arrangements being evaluated.

In March 1941, Nakajima was informed that the Ki-49 had been accepted into production as the Army Type 100 Heavy Bomber Model 1. Akin to the prototype, early production aircraft were armed with five 7.7 mm (0.303 in) machine guns and one 20 mm (0.787 in) cannon. Combat experience in China and New Guinea showed the aircraft to be somewhat underpowered, restricting both bomb capacity and airspeed as a result. This was addressed during the spring of 1942 by the arrival of an up-engined model of the Ki-49, fitted with more powerful Ha-109 engines and this became the production Army Type 100 Heavy Bomber Model 2 or Ki-49-IIa. The Model 2 also introduced improved armor and self-sealing fuel tanks; it was followed by the Ki-49-IIb in which 12.7 mm (0.5 in) Ho-103 machine guns replaced three of the 7.7 mm (0.303 in) Type 89 machine guns. In early 1943, further power increases were delayed on account of development difficulties with the 1,805 kW (2,421 hp) Nakajima Ha-117 engines, leading to the Ki-49-III never entering production and only six prototypes being built.

After 819 aircraft had been completed, production of the Ki-49 was terminated in December 1944. In addition to Nakajima's own production activities, fifty Ki-49s were completed by the Tachikawa Aircraft Company, although their efforts were hindered by poor quality jigs. Plans for the type to be produced by Manshukoku Hikoki Seizo KK never came to fruition.

== Operational history ==
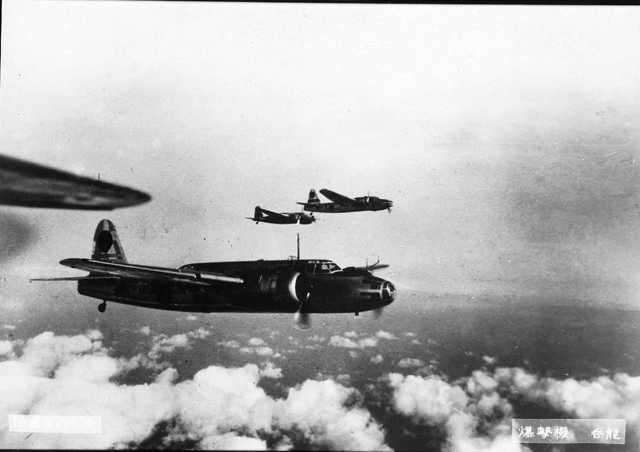
A formation of Ki-49s

The first Ki-49s became operational in autumn 1941 and flew its first combat missions in the Chinese theatre. Following the outbreak of the Pacific War, the Ki-49 was also active in the New Guinea area. Furthermore, it was one of the primary aircraft used to conduct air raids against Australia between 1942 and 1943.

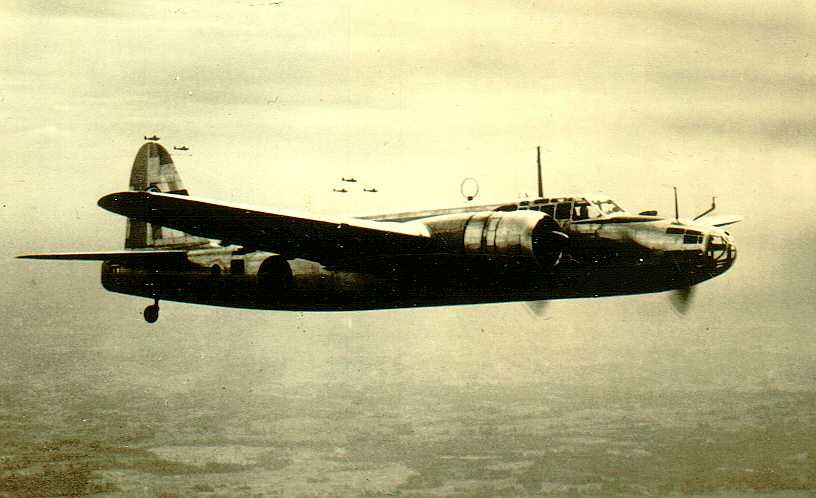
Ki-49 in flight over Japan, 1945

Combat experiences contributed to IJAAS officials not being fully satisfied with the Ki-49; feedback from operational units was fed back to Nakajima and led to various design improvements during the production run of the type. While the Ki-49 did supplement the older Ki-21, it was unable to entirely supplant the older bomber as had been intended. In spite of these improvements, losses continued to mount, as the quantity and quality of fighter opposition rose. In the face of its increasing vulnerability to opposing fighter aircraft while performing its intended role, the Ki-49 was used in other roles towards the end of the Pacific War, including anti-submarine warfare patrol, troop transport, and even night fighter missions.

When the Allies launched the Battle of the Philippines in 1944, the Ki-49 was used extensively in the IJAAS's efforts to resist the advance. During December 1944, most of the surviving aircraft were expended in kamikaze attacks upon Allied naval vessels supporting the landing at Mindoro. Typically, those Ki-49s intended for suicide attacks were stripped of all armaments, the crew reduced to only the two pilots, and an increase payload of 1,600 kg (3,500 lb) (or 3,527lb) of bombs carried.

== Variants ==
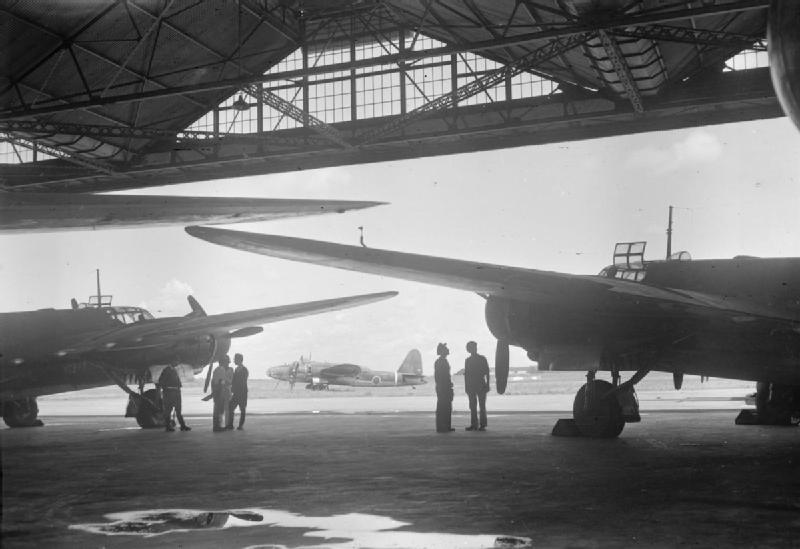
British troops inspect captured Ki-49s at Kalidjati airfield, Java c. 1945

Ki-49
Prototypes and pre-series models with a 708 kW (949 hp) Nakajima Ha-5 KAI or the 930 kW (1,250 hp) Ha-4. The pre-series with little modifications from the prototype.
Ki-49-I
Army Type 100 Heavy Bomber Model 1, initial production version.
Ki-49-II
Two prototypes fitted with two Nakajima Ha-109 radial piston engines.
Ki-49-IIa
Army Type 100 Heavy Bomber Model 2A - Production version with Ha-109 engines and armament as Model 1.
Ki-49-IIb
Version of Model 2 with 12.7 mm (0.50 in) Ho-103 machine guns replacing rifle caliber weapons.
Ki-49-III
Six prototypes fitted with two 1,805 kW (2,421 hp) Nakajima Ha-117 engines.
Ki-58
Escort fighter with Ha-109 engines, 5 x 20 mm (0.787 in) cannon, 3 x 12.7 mm (0.5 in) machine guns. Three prototypes built.
Ki-80
Specialized pathfinder aircraft - two prototypes; employed as engine test-beds.

== Operators ==
=== Wartime ===
Japan

- Imperial Japanese Army Air Service
  - No. 61 Hikō Sentai IJAAS
  - No. 62 Hikō Sentai IJAAS
  - No. 74 Hikō Sentai IJAAS
  - No. 95 Hikō Sentai IJAAS
  - No. 110 Hikō Sentai IJAAS
  - No. 11 Hikōshidan IJAAS
  - Hamamatsu Army Heavy Bomber School

=== Post-war ===
France

- Three captured aircraft were used between 1946 and 1949 in Indochina

Indonesia

- Indonesian Air Force - Ex-Japanese Aircraft were operated by Indonesian guerilla forces after the conflict.

Thailand

- Royal Thai Air Force - Flew a single Ki-49 as a transport, during 1945-1946 (postwar)

== Specifications (Ki-49-IIa) ==
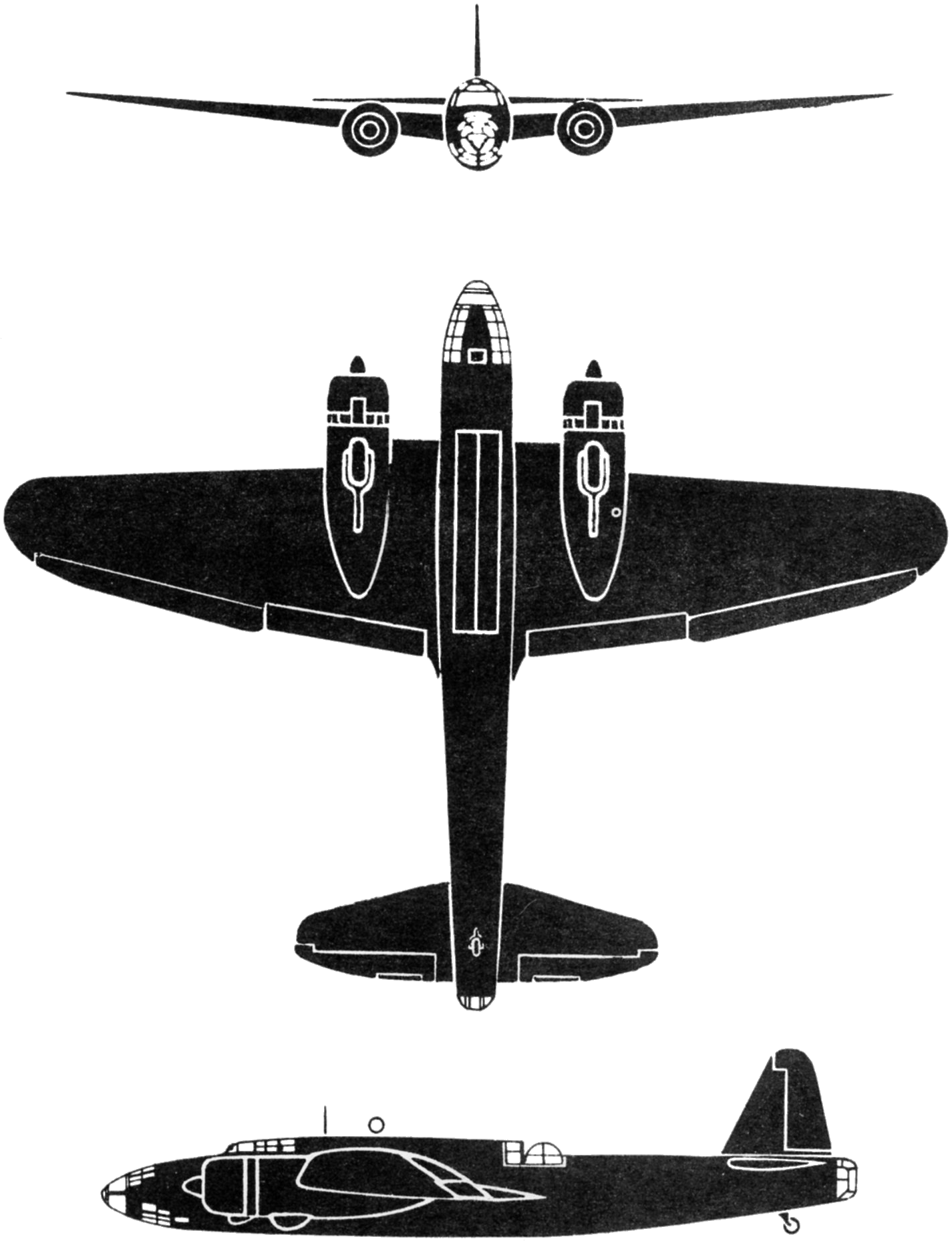
3-view silhouette of the Nakajima Ki-49

Data from Japanese Aircraft of the Pacific War, Axis Aircraft of World War II

General characteristics

- Crew: 8 (pilot, co-pilot, bombardier, navigator, radio operator/gunner and three gunners)
- Length: 16.5 m (54 ft 2 in)
- Wingspan: 20.42 m (67 ft 0 in)
- Height: 4.25 m (13 ft 11 in)
- Wing area: 69.05 m^{2} (743.2 sq ft)
- Empty weight: 6,530 kg (14,396 lb)
- Gross weight: 10,680 kg (23,545 lb)
- Max takeoff weight: 11,400 kg (25,133 lb)
- Powerplant: 2 × Nakajima Ha-109 Army Type 2 fourteen-cylinder air-cooled radial 14-cylinder air-cooled radial piston engines, 1,100 kW (1,500 hp) each for take-off

or 969 kW (1,300 hp) at 5,280 m (17,320 ft)

- Propellers: 3-bladed constant-speed metal propellers

Performance

- Maximum speed: 492 km/h (306 mph, 266 kn) at 5,000 m (16,000 ft)
- Cruise speed: 350 km/h (220 mph, 190 kn) at 3,000 m (9,800 ft)
- Range: 2,000 km (1,200 mi, 1,100 nmi)
- Ferry range: 2,950 km (1,830 mi, 1,590 nmi)
- Service ceiling: 9,300 m (30,500 ft)
- Time to altitude: 5,000 m (16,000 ft) in 13 minutes and 39 seconds
- Wing loading: 154.7 kg/m^{2} (31.7 lb/sq ft)
- Power/mass: 0.210 kW/kg (0.128 hp/lb)

Armament

- Guns: 1 × 20 mm (0.787 in) Ho-1 cannon in a dorsal gun position and 5 × 7.7 mm (0.303 in) Type 89 machine guns (one nose, two waist, one ventral, and one in a tail position).
- Bombs: 1,000 kg (2,200 lb) bomb load

== See also ==
Aircraft of comparable role, configuration, and era

- CANT Z.1007 Alcione
- Fokker T.V
- Heinkel He 111
- Ilyushin Il-4
- Junkers Ju 188
- Martin B-26 Marauder
- Mitsubishi G4M
- Mitsubishi Ki-67
- North American B-25 Mitchell
- Vickers Wellington

Related lists

- List of aircraft of World War II
- List of bomber aircraft
