= Battle of Tjiater Pass =

Battle during the Second World War

- Part of Battle of Java in the Dutch East Indies campaign
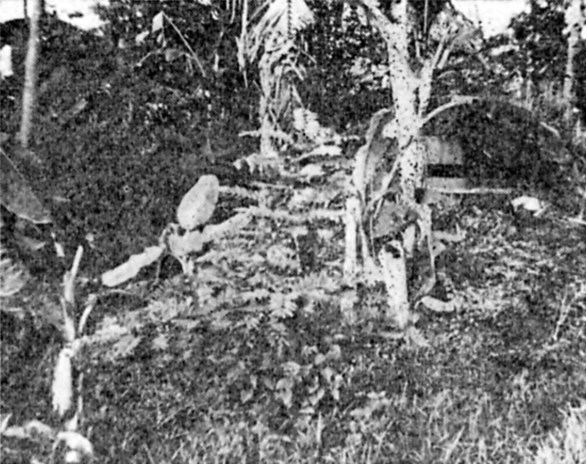
- A Dutch pillbox at Tjiater pass
Date	5–7 March 1942
Location	Tjiater Pass, West Java 6°46′S 107°38′E
Result	Japanese victory

Belligerents
Netherlands: Dutch East Indies; United Kingdom	Japan

Commanders and leaders
(Dutch government-in-exile) Jacob Pesman (surrendered) (Dutch government-in-exile) W.J. de Veer †	(Empire of Japan) Toshinari Shōji

Units involved
(Dutch government-in-exile) KNIL (United Kingdom) Royal Air Force	(Empire of Japan) 16th Army (Empire of Japan) 3rd Air Division

Strength
9,000; 27 aircraft	3,000; 39 aircraft

The Battle of Tjiater Pass occurred between 5 and 7 March 1942 during the Dutch East Indies campaign between invading Japanese forces and the Dutch colonial forces, supported by warplanes from the Royal Air Force. It was fought over control of the Tjiater Pass (now Ciater, part of Subang Regency), as part of an attempted defense of the city of Bandung.

Following Dutch withdrawal from most urban centers in Java in the aftermath of Japanese landings and the loss of the Kalijati airfield, remaining units of the Royal Netherlands East Indies Army (KNIL) established a defensive perimeter in the mountain passes around Bandung in the hopes of regrouping with retreating KNIL and Australian units abandoning Batavia and Buitenzorg. Despite the Japanese forces, led by Colonel Toshinari Shōji, being numerically inferior, they opted to launch an attack on the spread-out Dutch forces in order to prevent a possible counterattack.

Benefiting from air superiority and better training than their KNIL counterparts, Japanese soldiers successfully stormed and captured the undermanned defensive positions guarding the pass after three days of fighting, securing their path to Bandung after capturing the town of Lembang. Dutch forces, on the other hand, were demoralized by constant air raids and the intensive fighting. Wishing to avoid combat in Bandung, Dutch forces surrendered shortly after the battle. This led to the eventual capitulation of the entirety of the Dutch East Indies to Japan.

== Prelude ==
After a victory in the Battle of the Java Sea, Japanese land forces landed in the island of Java in three main locations, including one detachment led by Colonel Toshinari Shōji landing at Eretan Wetan, in what is today Indramayu, on dawn of 1 March 1942. The detachment quickly secured the Kalijati airfield and surrounding territories, allowing for the forward deployment of the Japanese air support (from the 3rd Air Division under Major General Endō Saburō). From Japanese-controlled territories in Subang, there were two paths leading to the Bandung plateau - through Purwakarta, or through the less-developed roads of the Tjiater Pass on the foothills of the Tangkuban Perahu. Dutch forces attempted to launch counterattacks via the Tjiater Pass on 2 and 3 March to recapture the Kalijati airfield, but the attempts failed.

The failed counteroffensive had exhausted Allied reserves, and the "West Group" of the Allied forces (including one KNIL infantry regiment and the Australian "Blackforce" brigade) had been ordered to abandon Batavia and Buitenzorg on 4 March. Another group of the KNIL, the "Bandoeng Group", was tasked with defending the Bandung plateau until the West Group could withdraw to Bandung and merge with them, forming a new unit which was expected to be able to hold the Japanese advance better. The Bandoeng Group was commanded by Major General Jacob Pesman. The Dutch forces were however successful in preventing the Japanese from severing the land connection between Batavia and Bandung.

== Forces ==
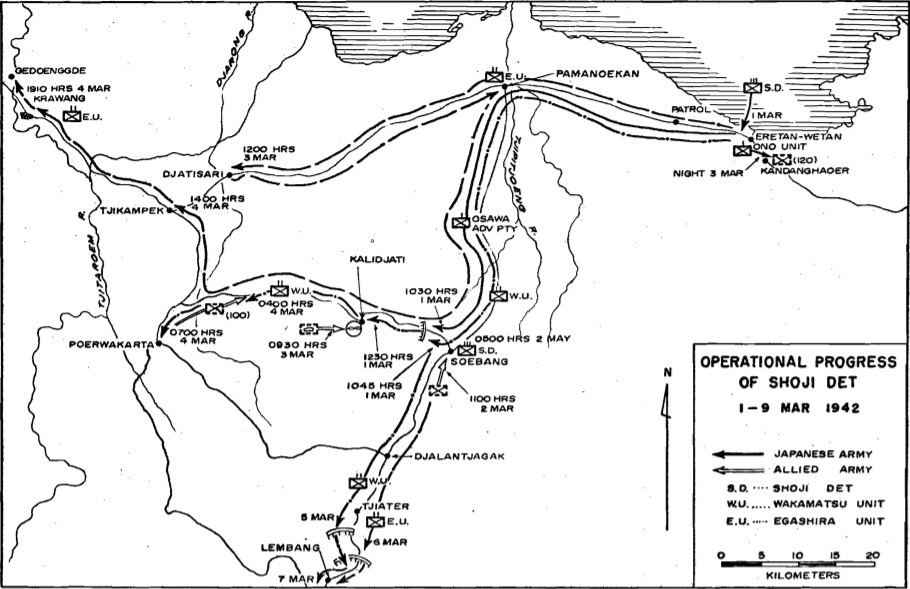
Movement of the Shoji Detachment after its landing

Pesman had at his disposal around 9,000 men, including 5,900 from his original force within the KNIL and augmented by the attachment of KNIL's 2nd infantry regiment and a battalion, but the units were split as they had to defend multiple locations at once. Additionally, the attached regiment had lost much of its combat effectiveness. In terms of air forces, there were 27 operational combat airplanes available to the KNIL forces - comprising 12 bombers, 11 fighters, and 4 reconnaissance aircraft. The West Group, under the command of Major General Wijbrandus Schilling, was retreating from its positions west of Bandung, with expectations of arriving in the area between 6 and 7 March and being combat effective by 10 March, until which the Bandung Group was tasked to "fill the gaps" in the defensive lines. Both passes which allowed motor access into Bandung were fortified by the Dutch, and the men guarding the fortifications were commanded by Colonel W.J. de Veer, who had commanded the KNIL's 4th infantry regiment.

Shōji's forces had been expected by the command of the Sixteenth Army to simply hold onto captured positions in Kalijati and onto crossings for the Citarum River, and to wait for further reinforcements in form of the 2nd Division, approaching from the west. However, due to constant air raids from allied aircraft sapping the potency of his air support and the threat of further counterattacks, Shōji opted to launch an attack on Bandung instead, concentrating his forces in order to launch an attack through Tjiater. Although there were concerns within the Japanese command with a potential stalemate at Tjiater, Shōji's operation was approved. His detachment comprised around 3,000 men who were better trained and more experienced than their KNIL counterparts, and out of these somewhere around 2,000 to 2,400 men were deployed in the battle. The Japanese were estimated to have 39 aircraft available for operations - including 14 bombers, 14 assault airplanes, 10 fighters, and a single reconnaissance aircraft.

Tjiater's fortifications on the northern end of the mountain pass had been designed to be held by an infantry regiment, and consisted of trenches, two lines of casemates, and barbed wire obstacle, with the first defensive line measuring about two kilometers in length and located right in front of a ravine. At the start of the battle, it was manned by one infantry battalion, reinforced by two additional platoons and several support units. There was also a secondary defensive line at the southern end of the mountain pass, though it was not fully constructed. The northern fortifications were undermanned, with only one infantry company holding the first line and the fortification itself having only limited operationality due to a lack of laborers following the Japanese invasion.

== Battle ==
On the morning of 4 March, both sides launched air raids on one another, the Dutch and the Royal Air Force aircraft targeting potential new Japanese troop landings and the Kalijati airfield while the Japanese targeted the Dutch airbase at Andir and forward Dutch defenses. Due to further air raids, the depleted Dutch forward units withdrew towards the main concentration of Dutch forces in Lembang. Later in that day, both sides continued to launch air raids. Air raids continued on both Andir and Kalijati in the early morning of the following day, accompanied by aerial reconnaissance missions.

The land battle for the pass began around noon of 5 March, when Japanese vanguard light tanks encountered Dutch fortifications in form of pillboxes and a 5-cm gun. Dutch defenders were supported by just a single battery of four guns, which did not have a significant effect on the fighting. The effectiveness of the pillboxes were also hindered by foliage. After around three hours of combat, Japanese infantrymen had approached the forward defenses and around 50 men were withdrawn, with the 5-cm gun being destroyed and a bridge crossing the ravine ahead of the fortifications blown up. As the Dutch soldiers retreated, the main first line of defenses began firing at the Japanese soldiers with mortars and machine guns, initially doing some damage before the Japanese responded with their own mortars. Within half an hour, Japanese infantrymen had infiltrated unmanned sections of the defensive line and attempted to encircle the defending company, forcing a retreat to the second line, around 500 meters away. The second line had poor visibility for artillery observers and some equipment such as searchlights and radio had been abandoned in the retreat. By 4 PM, Japanese soldiers were firmly entrenched in the first line and exchanged fire with Dutch troops in the second line, but did not manage to dislodge the defenders.

After receiving reports of the Japanese attack, Pesman deployed his reserves to Tjiater. They were however delayed by a traffic jam in the road leading to the defenses. As dusk approached, the reinforcements arrived in the vicinity, but were prevented from entering the second line due to some Japanese soldiers who managed to infiltrate the lines. As more Dutch soldiers arrived, the men in second line were eventually evacuated before daylight the following day. A new line of defense was established behind the fortifications, manned by some 950 soldiers. Behind the defense lines, there were just 400 inexperienced soldiers defending the southern exit of the pass. The Japanese had captured five pillboxes, and opted to pause their attack for the day. A KNIL motorized column moving north from Bandung was also intercepted by Japanese aerial bombardment.

On 6 March, the Japanese initially assessed that the defensive line was held by some 3,000 soldiers with a number of guns, but after the interrogation of a captured prisoner of war they found out that the defenders were considerably less than their assessment. The Japanese themselves had around 1,000 men in the pass, and still had an advantage in mortars and armor. There were also a large number of Japanese air raids, with hundreds of bombs being dropped, destroying vehicles and eroding Dutch morale. The initial infantry attacks on 6 March were launched against the western section of the defensive line at around 5:30 AM, which was initially repelled, and so was a second assault which was launched following an air raid. Japanese commanders, however, followed with a third wave supported by mortar fire and three tanks, which was successful in breaking the two infantry companies holding the section under attack. During the attacks, the Japanese had taken advantage of a thick fog in order to surprise the defenders. Between 30 and 50 were killed in combat from the two companies, and a further 75 were captured and massacred by the Japanese, leaving just six survivors. Later tallying in 1948 calculated 120 soldiers killed from the two companies from both combat and the massacre. Around midday, forward Japanese patrols had exchanged some machine gun fire with soldiers in the unfinished fortifications. In the afternoon, the Japanese had managed to outflank the defenses, launching an attack against the defenders which was pushed back by a Dutch counterattack. However, de Veer was killed in the counterattack and the fortifications were evacuated after the assault was repelled, and the remaining defenders were ordered to withdraw to Lembang.

Once the positions were captured, the Japanese were in control of the ridgeline of the mountain pass, and the Dutch forces were left in poor reserve defenses. Fighting on 7 March largely consisted of Japanese mopping-up operations, eliminating Dutch units close to the ridgeline. Japanese soldiers also continued to move towards Lembang, though their advance was halted at a destroyed bridge for some time. After some more fighting, the units in Lembang began to further retreat towards Bandung.

== Aftermath ==
With the Japanese securing the mountain pass, the allied forces in West Java found their position untenable. At night on 7 March, the Japanese forces moved in and occupied Lembang, and there at around 7:30 PM they received a Dutch messenger carrying a flag of truce. While the Dutch initially intended to discuss the capitulation of KNIL soldiers exclusively in the Bandung area, Japanese 16th Army Commander Hitoshi Imamura decided to demand the total capitulation of allied forces in the Dutch East Indies, during negotiations held the following day in Kalijati Airfield. There, governor-general Tjarda van Starkenborgh Stachouwer and Dutch East Indies military commander Hein ter Poorten initially refused a total capitulation.

Units of the West Group, excluding the Australian brigade, had arrived in Bandung. Its commander Arthur Blackburn initially intended to launch a guerilla campaign against the Japanese, but gave up due to unfavourable conditions. Due to the threat of continued fighting in Bandung, which was filled with a large number of refugees, the Dutch authorities broadcast their general surrender on noon on 9 March. Formal instruments of surrender were signed less than three hours later.

== Bibliography ==
- Boer, P. C. (2011). The Loss of Java: The Final Battles for the Possession of Java Fought by Allied Air, Naval and Land Forces in the Period of 18 February - 7 March 1942. Singapore: NUS Press. ISBN 978-9971-69-513-2.
- de Jong, Louis (1985). Het Konikrijk der Nederlanden in de Tweede Wereldoorlog Deel 11a: Nederlands-Indië II [The Kingdom of the Netherlands During World War II Part 11a: Dutch East Indies II] (PDF) (in Dutch). Leiden: Martinus Nijhoff. Archived from the original (PDF) on 2022-09-26.
- United States Army Forces in the Far East; Eighth U.S. Army (1958). The Invasion of the Netherlands East Indies (16th Army) (PDF). Office of the Chief of Military History. Archived (PDF) from the original on January 28, 2020.
- National Defense College of Japan (2015) [1967]. The invasion of the Dutch East Indies (PDF). Translated by William Remmelink. Leiden: Leiden University Press. ISBN 978-9087-28-237-0.
