= Toshinari Shōji =

Japanese officer, war criminal 1890-1974

- 東海林 俊成
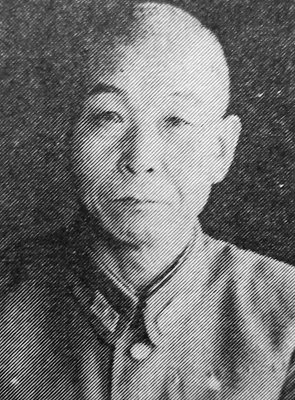
- Born: October 27, 1890; Sendai, Miyagi, Japan
- Died: December 10, 1974 (aged 84)
- Military career
- Allegiance: Empire of Japan
- Branch: Imperial Japanese Army
- Service years: 1912-1945
- Rank: Major General
- Commands: 230th Infantry Regiment
- Conflicts: World War II; Dutch East Indies campaign; Guadalcanal campaign

Toshinari Shōji, also known as Toshishige Shoji (東海林 俊成, Shōji Toshinari (Toshishige); October 27, 1890 – December 10, 1974) was a major general in the Imperial Japanese Army during the Pacific campaign in World War II.

== Biography ==
A native of Miyagi Prefecture, Shōji graduated from the 25th class of the Imperial Japanese Army Academy in 1912. He subsequently graduated from the Army Staff College in 1912.

Shōji was promoted to rank of colonel on August 1, 1939. Beginning in 1941, he commanded the Imperial Japanese Army 230th Infantry Regiment, sometimes called the Shōji Detachment, which was part of the 38th Division. From February through March 1942, this unit participated in the invasion of Java as part of the Netherlands East Indies campaign. There, his unit captured an airfield on the day of his landing in the Battle of Kalijati and later launched a successful gamble to break through Dutch fortifications surrounding Bandung in the Battle of Tjiater Pass, leading to the Dutch capitulation.

In October 1942, he and his regiment were deployed to Guadalcanal as part of the strategically significant Guadalcanal campaign. After participating to a minor degree in the Battle for Henderson Field, Shōji's regiment took heavy losses in the Koli Point action, Carlson's patrol, and Battle of Mount Austen, the Galloping Horse, and the Sea Horse.

Surviving the Japanese defeat in the campaign and withdrawal from Guadalcanal, Shōji was promoted to major general in March 1944. After his return to the Japanese home islands in 1945, he was appointed commander of the Sendai Area Command under the Japanese Fifth Area Army in the final stages of World War II.

In the aftermath of the war, Shōji was sent to Batavia to stand trial for war crimes committed against prisoners of war and civilians by men under his command in the Netherlands East Indies, and he was sentenced to death in January 1949. His sentence was reduced in December to 10 years of imprisonment, and he was sent to Sugamo Prison in Tokyo. He died in December 1974.
