= Lunga River (Solomon Islands) =

River in the Solomon Islands

Coordinates: 9°26′05.67″S 160°02′01.12″E

Lunga
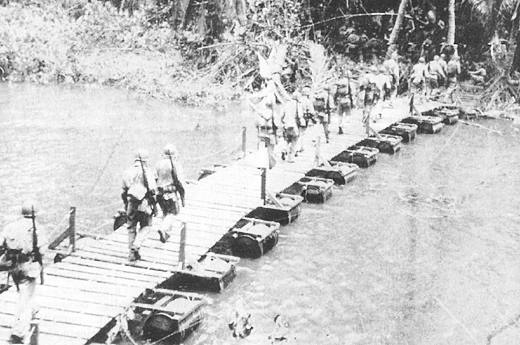
- A U.S. Marine patrol crosses a pontoon bridge across the Lunga River on Guadalcanal in September or October 1942

Location
- Country: Solomon Islands

Physical characteristics
- Source
  - location: Guadalcanal
- Mouth
  - location: Ironbottom Sound
- Discharge
  - location: mouth

The Lunga River is a river on the northern coast of Guadalcanal, Solomon Islands. It empties into Ironbottom Sound (called Savo Sound prior to World War II) at Lunga Point.
