= Suryadarma Air Force Base =

Military airport in Subang, West Java, Indonesia

- Pangkalan Angkatan Udara Suryadarma
- Kalijati, Subang Regency, West Java in Indonesia
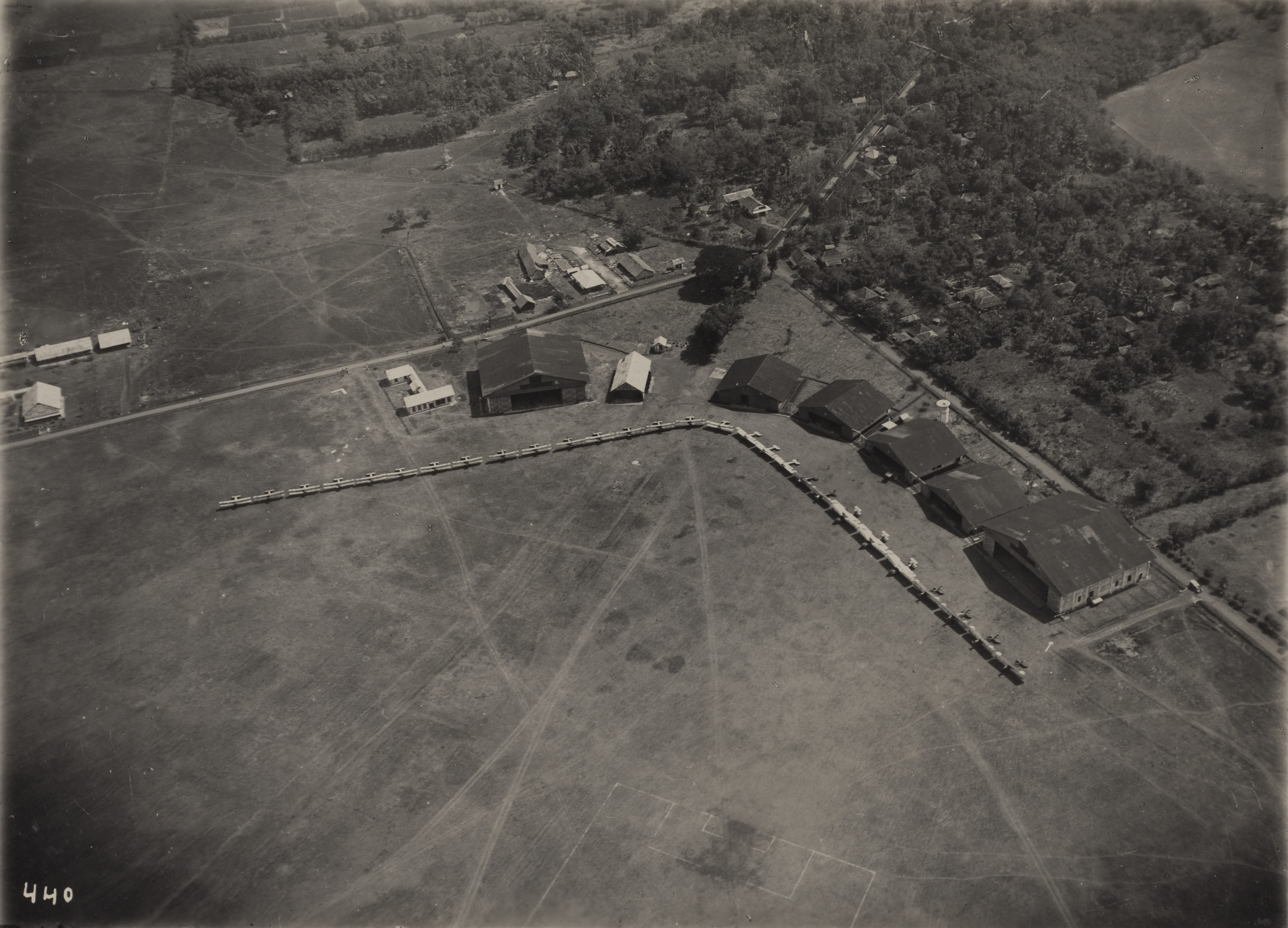
- Aerial view of Kalijati Airfield in early 1930s

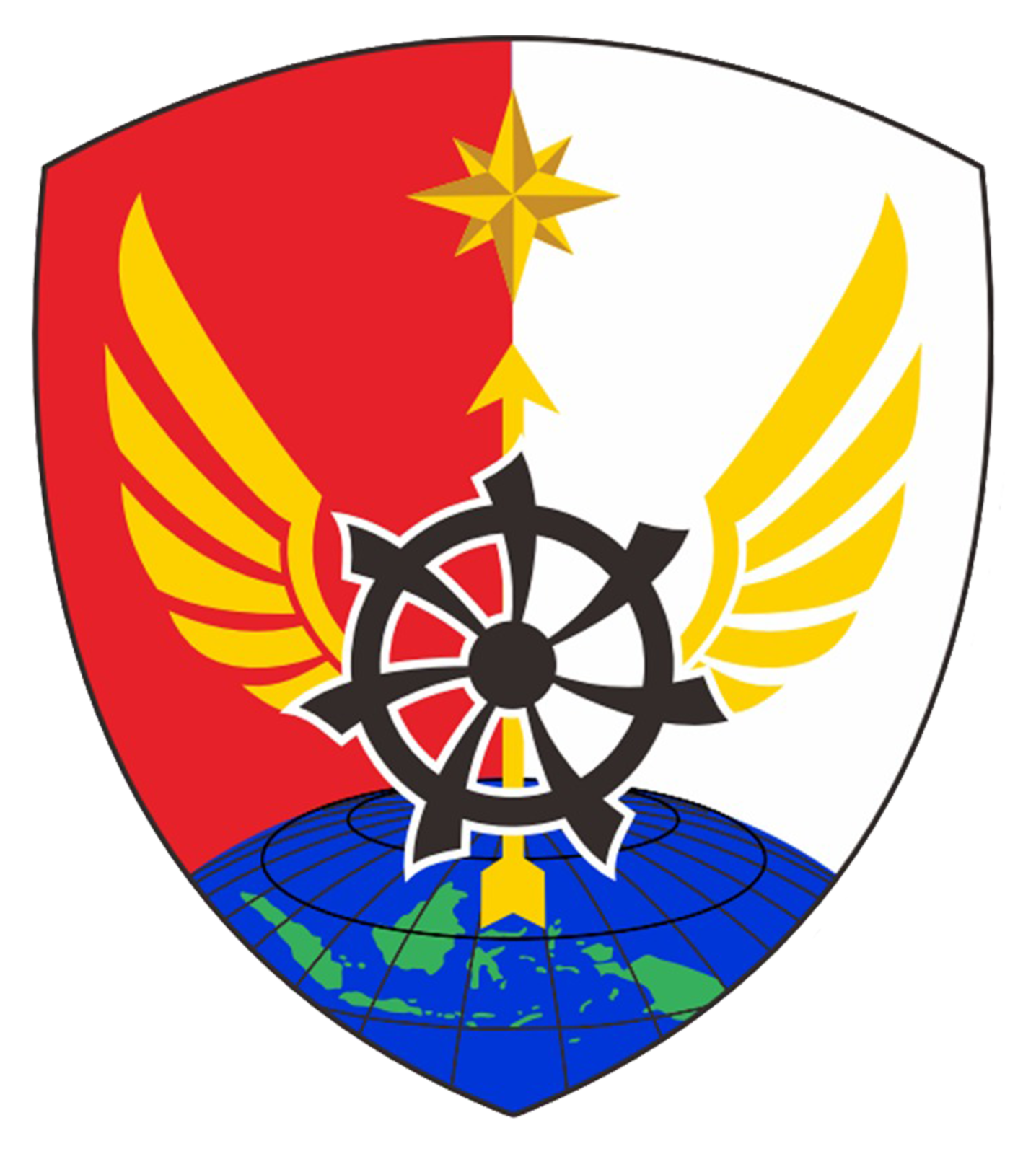

Site information
- Type: Type A Air Force Base
- Owner: Indonesian Air Force
- Controlled by: National Air Operations Command
- Open to the public: Museum Rumah Sejarah; Museum Amerta Dirgantara Mandala
- Condition: Operational
- Website: lanud-suryadarma.tni-au.mil.id

Location
- Location within West Java Location within Indonesia
- Coordinates: 6°31′53″S 107°39′33″E

Site history
- Built: January 1916 (as Kalidjati Vliegveld)
- Built by: Royal Netherlands East Indies Army Air Force
- In use: 1916–present
- Battles/wars: Dutch East Indies campaign; Battle of Java (1942); Battle of Kalijati; Indonesian National Revolution

Garrison information
- Current commander: Air Commodore Sapuan
- Garrison: 8th Air Wing; 7th Air Squadron; Agricultural Air Unit

Airfield information
- Identifiers: ICAO: WIHK
- Elevation: 110 metres (361 ft) AMSL
Runways
Direction	Length and surface
09/27	1,200 metres (3,937 ft) Grass

Suryadarma Air Force Base (ICAO: WIHK) formely ICAO code as WIIK is one of the Indonesian Air Force bases on Java. Formerly known as Kalijati Airfield (alternatively spelled as Kalidjati), it is located in the village of Kalijati, in the kabupaten of Subang in West Java.

The base was named after Suryadi Suryadarma, the first Commander-in-Chief of the Indonesian Air Force. The base was the first military airfield to be built in Indonesia, constructed in 1916.

== History ==
=== Dutch East Indies ===
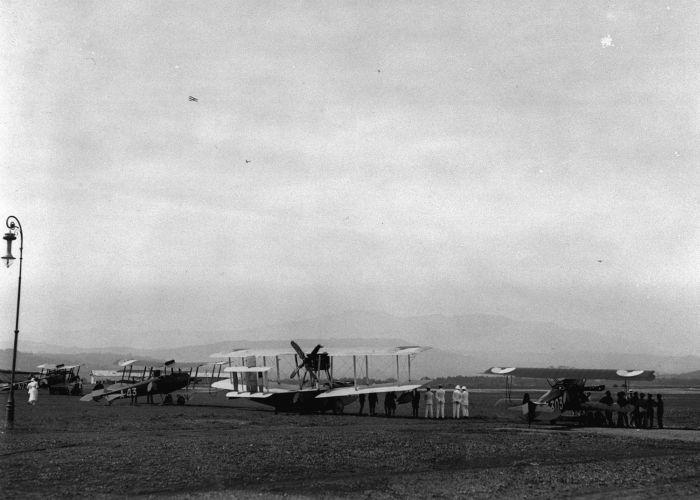
Visit of D. Fock, governor-general of the Netherlands Indies, to Kalijati in 1922

The Proefvliegafdeling-KNIL (PVA-KNIL), an aircraft testing unit within the Royal Netherlands East Indies Army and the precursor to the ML-KNIL, was created on 30 May 1914. One of the first aircraft type used by the KNIL was the Glenn Martin TA hydroplane, which was based at a seaplane base in Tanjung Priok, Batavia. Due to the wooden construction of the aircraft, it was thought that the seawater might impact the aircraft's flying performance, and so the PVA was looking to construct a land-based aerodrome. A patch of forest near Kalijati, located 100 km east of Batavia and 50 km north of Bandung, was chosen due to its flat topography. The Kalijati Airfield (Van Ophuijsen: Kalidjati) was established in January 1916. In its first years, the airfield building consisted of bamboo wards with grass runway. The buildings and airfield facility was completed in 1917.

Luitenant Hein ter Poorten flew a Glenn Martin TA aircraft from Kalijati on 8 February 1916, becoming the first person to flew an aircraft from Kalijati. The aircraft was a hydroplane modified by swapping its pontoons for landing gears. His second flight was on 14 February. Also onboard the aircraft was Luitenant-generaal Johan Pieter Michielsen, the commander of the colonial army. The flight ended in a crash, killing Michielsen, with Ter Poorten suffering injury in the head.

The PVA-KNIL would later stationed some of its converted Glenn Martin TA hydroplanes at Kalijati.

In March 1917, the PVA-KNIL received eight Wright-Martin Model R recon aircraft and four Glenn Martin TT training aircraft and stationed them in Kalijati, later followed by the opening of the flight school at the airfield. Due to its importance as the training site for pilots, in the same year the runway was lengthened to 1,400 metres.

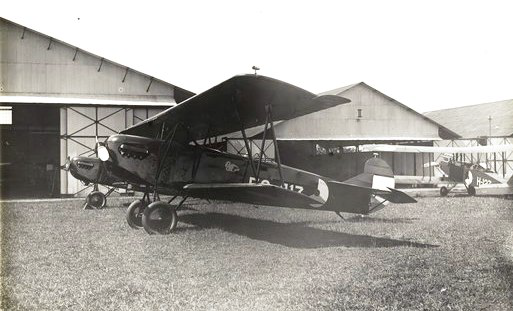
Two Fokker C.IV and an Airco DH.9 in front of hangars at Kalijati, c. 1930

During the 1919 England to Australia flight, one of the contestants' aircraft, the Vickers Vimy "G-EAOU", transited at Kalijati on 6 December 1919. The arrival of the aircraft was welcomed by the Governor-General Johan Paul van Limburg Stirum.

On 29 December 1930, Onderluitenant J.A.J. Oonincx was testing a new parachute for the air force by jumping from a Fokker C.IV flying above the airfield. It was the first time a parachute was used in Dutch East Indies and later Indonesia.

Kalijati Airfield was inactivated for some time due to budget cuts caused by the Great Depression in the 1920s. In the mid-1930s, the 3e Vliegtuig Afdeling, a squadron equipped with the obsolete Curtiss P-6 Hawk, was stationed at Kalijati. At the same time, some of the ML-KNIL's new Martin 139 bomber fleet was stationed at Kalijati due to overcapacity at the Andir Airfield in Bandung.

=== World War II ===
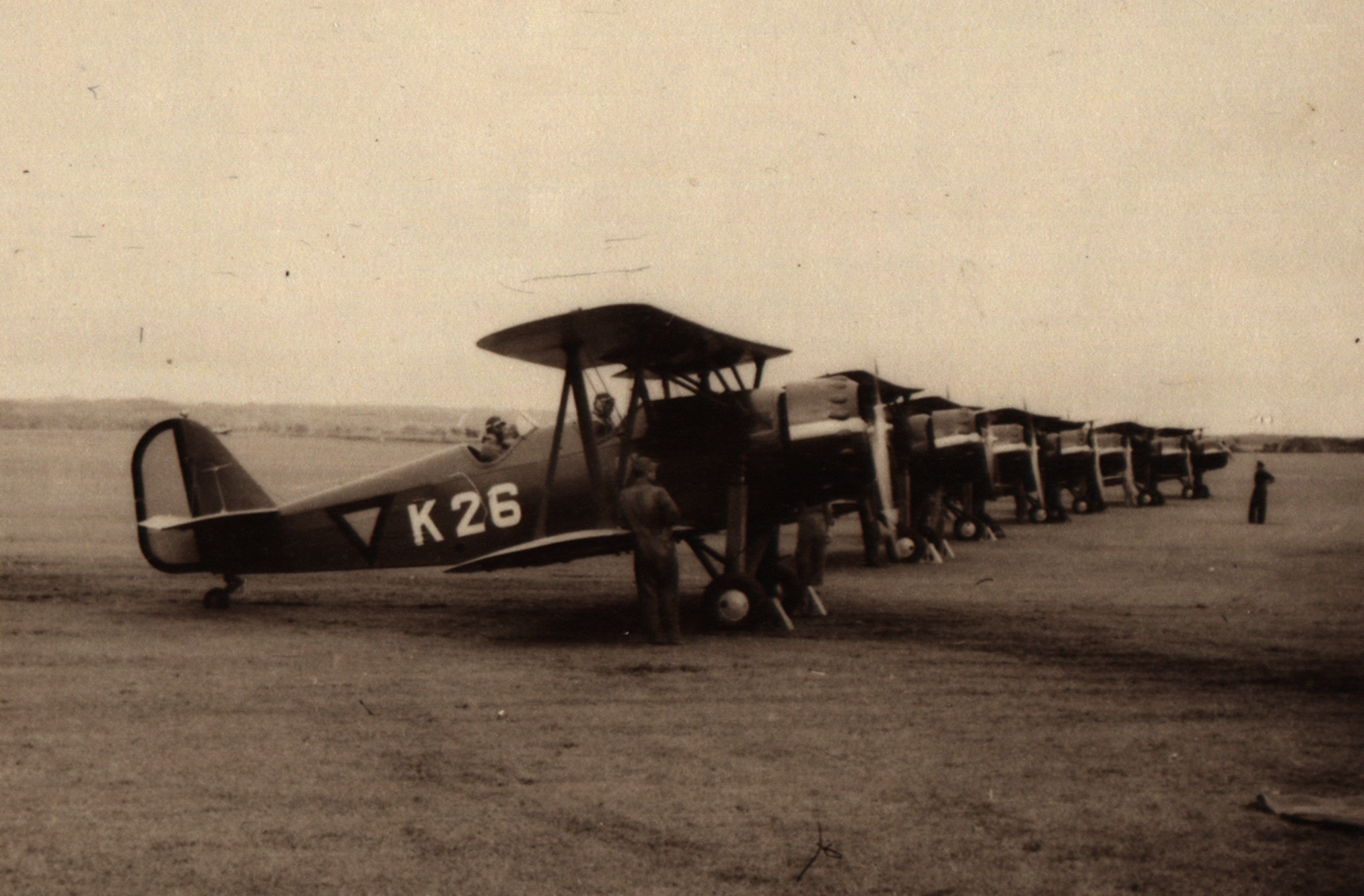
Rows of Koolhoven F.K.51 at Kalijati, c. 1940–1941

At the start of the Pacific War in December 1941, Kalijati was the home base for the following units:

- A patrouille of the IIe Vliegtuiggroep (VLG-II), equipped with four Martin 139 bombers, under the command of Netherlands Naval Aviation Service. Its personnel were mobilized from the Kalijati flight school.
- 3e and 5e Verkenningsafdeeling (Recon Squadron), each equipped with 12 Koolhoven F.K.51.
- 5e Verkenningsafdeeling, equipped with 12 Lockheed 212.

After the fall of Sumatra, Bristol Blenheims of the No. 84 Squadron RAF were relocated to Kalijati.

Japanese raids

At the start of the Battle of Java, there were 43 Dutch fighters stationed at Kalijati, consisted of 24 Brewster Buffalo, two Curtiss Hawk 75A, six Curtiss-Wright CW-21B and 11 Hurricane Mk IIB, although only 26 of them were operational. Some anti-aircraft guns were also provided for airfield defence.

The first Japanese air raid against Kalijati during the Dutch East Indies campaign occurred on 20 February 1942. A mixed force of 34 Ki-43 fighters and 10 Ki-48 bombers from the 59th, 64th, and 90th Sentais of the IJAAF Third Air Army based in Palembang attacked the airfield and claimed the destruction of eight Allied aircraft, although the Allied forces only claim two Dutch bombers destroyed, with two others damaged. Another raid from 29 Ki-43 fighters and 15 Ki-48 bombers from the previous units took place the next day on 21 February. The Japanese claiming six Allied aircraft destroyed with the loss of one Japanese aircraft, while the Allies claimed to shot down a Ki-43 and two Ki-48, with their losses included a Buffalo and a CW-21B destroyed, with two Buffalos heavily damaged.

On the 23 February, six RAAF Lockheed Hudson was transferred to Kalijati from Semplak airfield.

On the morning 24 February, 16 Ki-48 of the 75th Sentai escorted by 13 Ki-43 fighters of 64th Sentai launched a raid against Kalijati, destroying two Hudsons with three Ki-48 shot down by anti-aircraft fire. On the next day, a total of 56 aircraft from the previous units attacked the airfield and claimed to destroy seven Allied aircraft, though actually only two RAF Blenheims were destroyed on the ground and three Dutch Hurricanes shot down, in exchange for a Ki-43 and two Ki-48 shot down.

Battle of Kalijati

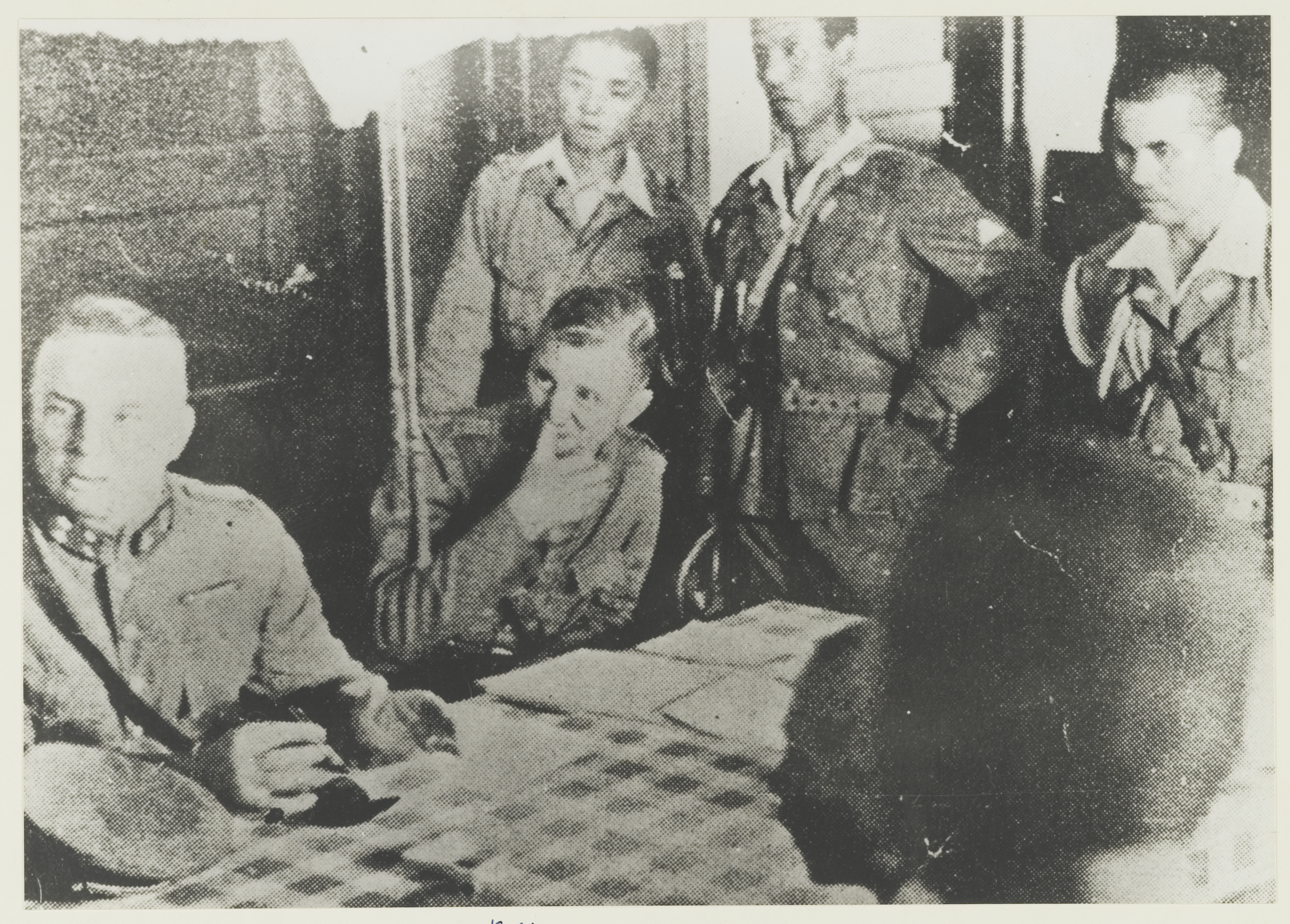
Dutch delegation at Kalijati during the negotiation for Dutch surrender

The Japanese considered Kalijati Airfield as one of the strategic targets to capture in western Java, as it would enable them to control the communication route between Bandung and Batavia that run through Subang, located just north of Bandung. The airfield would also be utilized to base large numbers of aircraft for the offensive to seize Bandung. On 1 March 1942, a detachment of Japanese forces landed at Eretan Wetan in Indramayu, and within few hours the Kalijati Airfield would fall into Japanese hands. Alongside the airfield itself, the Japanese captured 23 British Blenheims, 50 Dutch Ryan STMs, a Martin 139 and a Dutch Hurricane, alongside amounts of aviation fuel and munitions. The Japanese forces also summarily executed Allied personnel captured at Kalijati. The Allied forces would launch several counterattacks in the next two days to recapture the airfield, but the Japanese were able to repel them with the help of air support.

On the afternoon of 2 March, three Ki-43 fighters of the 59th Sentai and Ki-51 attackers of 27th Sentai arrived at Kalijati. At 18:15 hours that day, the newly captured airfield was attacked by four Buffalos, two CW-21B and seven Hurricanes, which heavily damaged seven aircraft and another four suffered light damage. Another attack at 22:30 hours by two Martin 139s destroyed a transport aircraft.

On the next day, at 05:15 hours, two Martin 139s and two CW-21B attacked Kalijati and destroyed an anti-aircraft gun. Five Buffalos and six Hurricanes arrived half an hour later and damaged the captured Blenheims and transport aircraft. At 06:00, four Martin 139s attacked, damaging hangars and destroying barracks. One of the Martin 139 bombers was shot down. A lone Martin 139 raided the airfield an hour later, which was intercepted by a Ki-43 and managed to flee. At 10:00, the Dutch forces started a counterattack, covered by 10 Hurricanes from No. 242 Squadron RAF based at Cililitan. The Hurricanes managed to destroy 12 bombers and transports on the ground. The Hurricanes were met by 4-5 Ki-43 and dogfight ensued, with each sides losing an aircraft. In midday, more Ki-43 of the 59th Sentai and Ki-48 bombers of 75th Sentai arrived at the airfield. 27 aircraft of Third Air Army based at Kalijati flew six missions between 14:30 and 18:00 to repel Dutch counterattack, destroying 158 vehicles, including 10 tanks and 44 armored vehicles.

At 4 March, a total of 11 Allied aircraft attacked Kalijati three times, destroying one aircraft and damaged six others. Later in the day, a retaliatory strike was launched from Kalijati against Andir airfield in Bandung. In the morning of next day, two Allied aircraft raided the airfield. On the 7 March, another Allied raid was launched against Kalijati, causing more than 20 casualties. Later in the day, aircraft from Kalijati would launch strikes against Bandung and Tasikmalaya.

Negotiations and the formal signing for the surrender of the Dutch East Indies took place at the airfield on 8–9 March 1942.

Japanese occupation

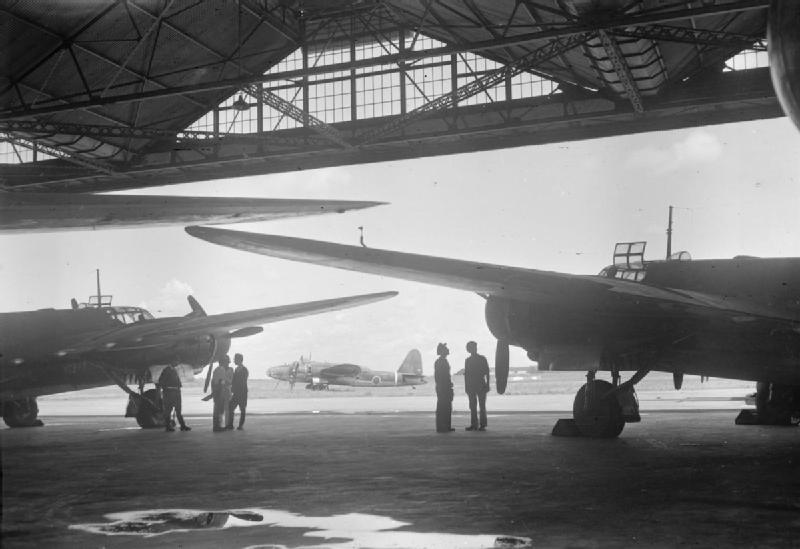
British personnel inspecting Japanese Ki-49 bombers at Kalijati, c. 1945–1946

The 7th Sentai, a heavy bomber unit equipped with Nakajima Ki-49, was stationed at the Kalijati. The 28 aircraft of the 7th Sentai left Manchuria on 12 September 1942 and arrived at Kalijati on 3 October.

=== Post-World War II ===
The ownership of Kalijati Airfield was transferred from Royal Dutch East Indies Army Air Force to the Indonesian Air Force on 27 December 1949, at the conclusion of the Indonesian National Revolution. Kalijati was again used as Air Force's flight school until 1960, when the program was merged with the Indonesian Air Force Academy in Yogyakarta.

On 16 June 1971, the Agricultural Air Unit (Satuan Udara Pertanian) of the Indonesian Air Force was created to help with domestic agricultural pest control, with Kalijati as its home base. The unit was first equipped with LIPNUR Gelatik, and later was supplanted with Cessna 188 and Pilatus PC-6 Porter.

In 1989, the 7th Air Squadron, a helicopter training squadron consisted of Bell 47G Soloy, Hughes 500 and Bell 204, was gradually transferred from Atang Sendjaja Air Force Base in three waves, starting on 17 April 1989. Kalijati was officially made the home base of 7th Air Squadron on 1 January 1991. As those helicopters were retired, the squadron currently (as of 2024) only operated Eurocopter EC120 Colibri.

Kalijati Air Force Base was officially renamed to Suryadarma Air Force Base on 7 September 2001, in honor of the first Chief of Staff of the Indonesian Air Force, Air Chief Marshall Soerjadi Soerjadarma.
