= Battle of Mount Austen, the Galloping Horse, and the Sea Horse =

World War II battle on Guadalcanal

Coordinates: 9°27′51″S 159°57′28″E

- Part of the Pacific Theater of World War II
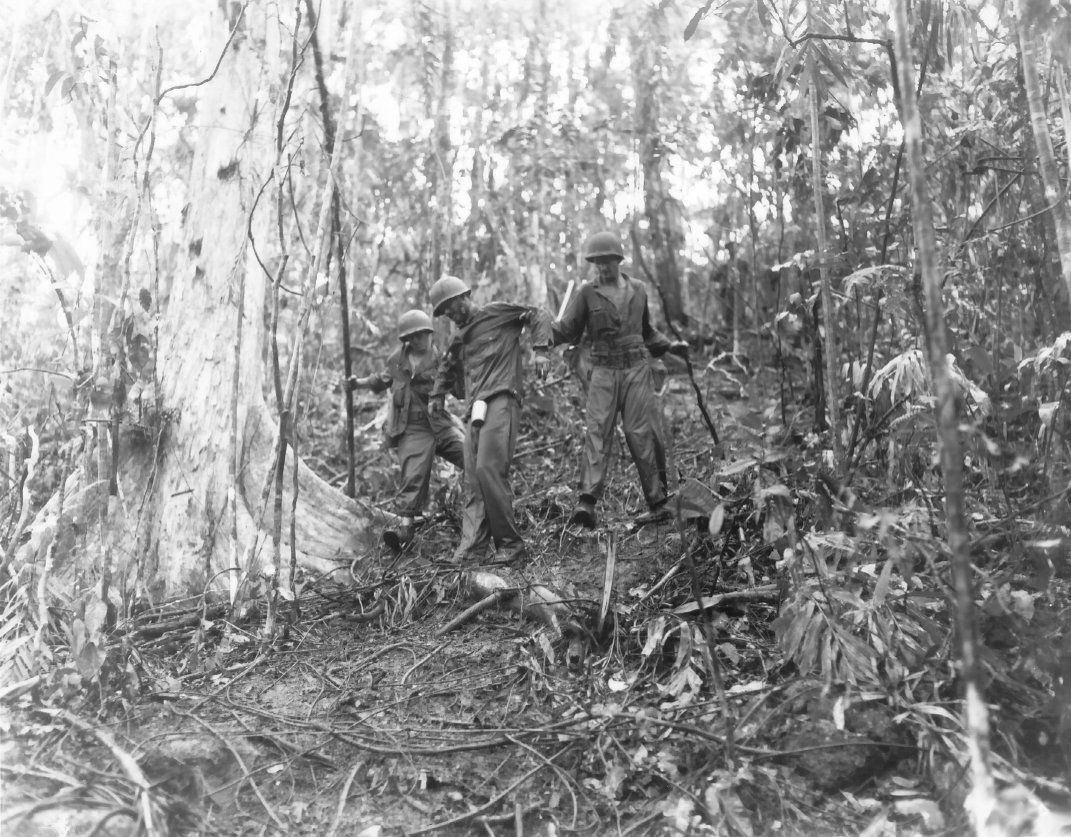
- A wounded United States Army soldier is assisted off of the line in the hills near the Matanikau River on 15 January 1943.
Date	15 December 1942 – 23 January 1943; (1 month, 1 week, and 1 day)
Location	Guadalcanal, Solomon Islands
Result	Allied victory

Belligerents
Allied forces including: United States; British Solomon Islands; Colony of Fiji; New Zealand	Japan

Commanders and leaders
(United States) Alexander Patch; William C. Wright †; Leroy E. Nelson	(Empire of Japan) Harukichi Hyakutake; Takeyoshi Inagaki †

Units involved
(United States) XIV Corps: 2nd Marine Division; Americal Division; 25th Infantry Division; 147th Infantry Regiment; New Zealand Expeditionary Force	(Empire of Japan) 17th Army: 2nd Infantry Division; 2nd Battalion, 228th Infantry; 38th Infantry Division; 18th Infantry Division; 35th Infantry Brigade; 2nd Battalion, 124th Infantry; (Empire of Japan) 8th Fleet

Strength
50,078	20,000: 500–600 defenders at Mt. Austen

Casualties and losses
250 killed	2,700–3,300 killed

The Battle of Mount Austen, the Galloping Horse, and the Sea Horse, part of which is sometimes called the Battle of the Gifu, or the Battle of the Mountain of Blood among the Japanese, took place from 15 December 1942 to 23 January 1943 and was primarily an engagement between United States and Imperial Japanese forces in the hills near the Matanikau River area on Guadalcanal during the Guadalcanal campaign. The U.S. forces were under the overall command of Major General Alexander Patch and the Japanese forces were under the overall command of Lieutenant General Harukichi Hyakutake.

In the battle, U.S. soldiers and Marines, assisted by native Solomon Islanders, attacked Imperial Japanese Army forces defending well-fortified and entrenched positions on several hills and ridges. The most prominent hills were called Mount Austen, the Galloping Horse, and the Sea Horse by the Americans. The U.S. was attempting to destroy the Japanese forces on Guadalcanal, and the Japanese were trying to hold their defensive positions until reinforcements could arrive.

Both sides experienced extreme difficulties in fighting in the thick jungles and tropical environment of the battle area. Many American troops were also involved in their first combat operations. The Japanese were mostly cut off from resupply and suffered greatly from malnourishment and lack of medical care. After some difficulty, the U.S. succeeded in taking Mount Austen, in the process reducing a strongly defended position called the Gifu, as well as the Galloping Horse and the Sea Horse. In the meantime, the Japanese decided to abandon Guadalcanal and withdrew to the west coast of the island. From there most of the surviving Japanese troops were successfully evacuated during the first week of February 1943.

== Background ==
=== Guadalcanal campaign ===
Eight months after the beginning of the Pacific War, on 7 August 1942 Allied forces (primarily U.S.) landed on Guadalcanal, Tulagi, and Florida Islands in the Solomon Islands. The landings on the islands were meant to deny their use by the Japanese as bases for threatening the supply routes between the U.S. and Australia, and to secure the islands as starting points for a campaign with the eventual goal of isolating the major Japanese base at Rabaul while also supporting the Allied New Guinea campaign. The landings initiated the six-month-long Guadalcanal campaign.

The Japanese were taken by surprise. By nightfall on 8 August, the 11,000 Allied troops—primarily from the 1st Marine Division of the United States Marine Corps under the command of Lieutenant General Alexander Vandegrift—secured Tulagi and nearby small islands as well as the Japanese airfield under construction at Lunga Point on Guadalcanal. The Allies later renamed the airfield Henderson Field. Allied aircraft operating out of Henderson were called the "Cactus Air Force" (CAF) after the Allied code name for Guadalcanal. To protect the airfield, the U.S. established a perimeter defense around Lunga Point. Additional reinforcements over the next two months increased the number of U.S. troops at Lunga Point on Guadalcanal to more than 20,000.

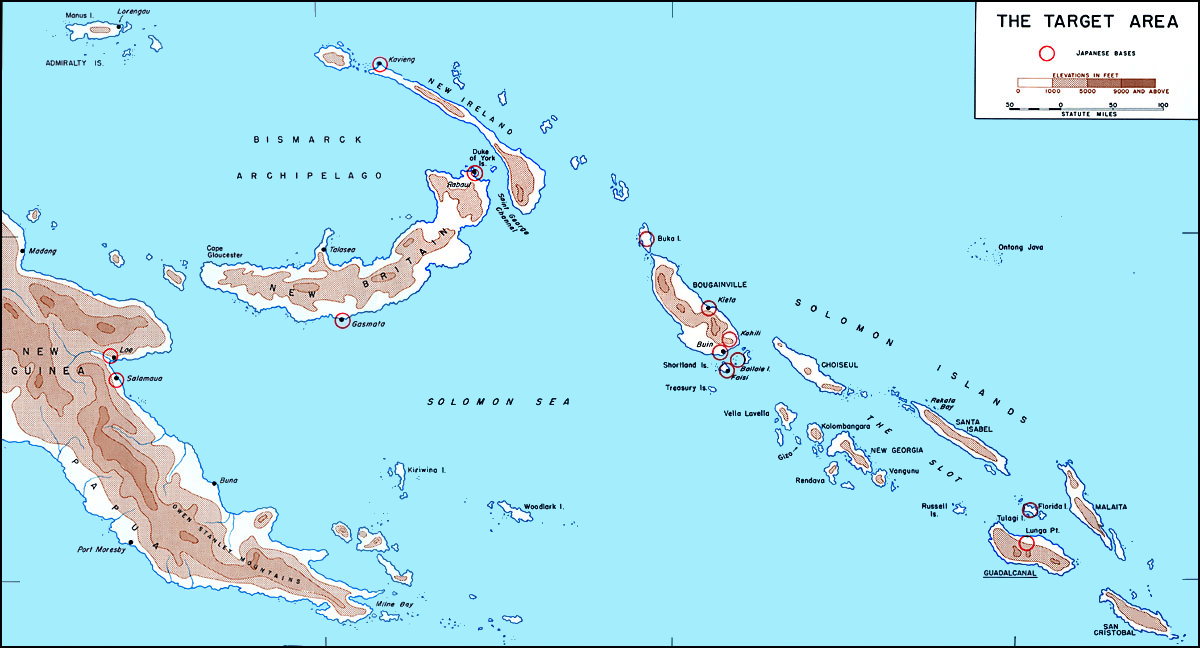
The Solomon Islands. "The Slot" (New Georgia Sound) runs down the center of the islands, from Bougainville and the Shortlands (center) to Guadalcanal (lower right). Rabaul on New Britain is at the upper center.

In response to the Allied landings on Guadalcanal, the Japanese Imperial General Headquarters assigned the Imperial Japanese Army's 17th Army—a corps-sized command based at Rabaul and under the command of Lieutenant General Harukichi Hyakutake—with the task of retaking Guadalcanal. Units of the 17th Army began to arrive on Guadalcanal on 19 August to drive Allied forces from the island.

Because of the threat by CAF aircraft based at Henderson Field, the Japanese were unable to use large, slow transport ships to deliver troops and supplies to the island. Instead, the Japanese used warships based at Rabaul and the Shortland Islands to carry their forces to Guadalcanal. The Japanese warships—mainly light cruisers or destroyers from the Eighth Fleet under the command of Vice Admiral Gunichi Mikawa—were usually able to make the round trip down "The Slot" to Guadalcanal and back in a single night, thereby minimizing their exposure to CAF air attack. Delivering the troops in this manner, however, prevented most of the soldiers' heavy equipment and supplies, such as heavy artillery, vehicles, and much food and ammunition, from being carried to Guadalcanal with them. These high-speed warship runs to Guadalcanal occurred throughout the campaign and were later called the "Tokyo Express" by the Allies and "Rat Transportation" by the Japanese.

Using forces delivered to Guadalcanal in this manner, the Japanese tried three times to retake Henderson Field, but they were defeated each time. First, a reinforced battalion from the 28th Infantry Regiment was defeated in the Battle of the Tenaru on 21 August. Next, the augmented 35th Infantry Brigade was defeated in the Battle of Edson's Ridge on 12–14 September. Finally, the 2nd Infantry Division augmented by one regiment from the 38th Infantry Division was defeated with heavy losses in the Battle for Henderson Field on 23–26 October.

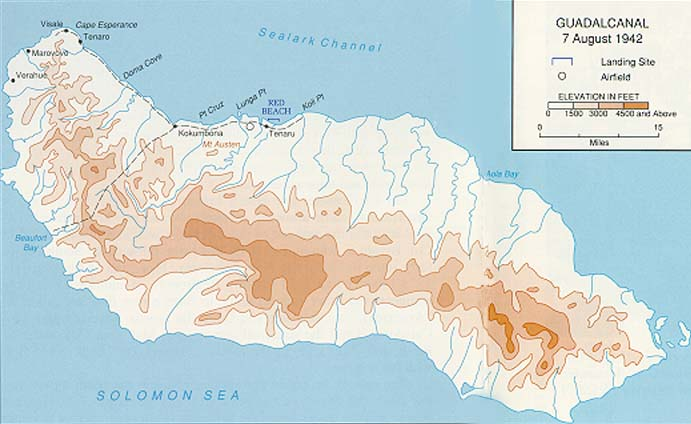
Guadalcanal. Lunga Point and Mount Austen are at the upper-center-left of the map.

Throughout the campaign, the Japanese used Mount Austen (called Bear Height by the Japanese and Mount Mambulu by the local Solomon Islanders), west of the Lunga River and about 6 mi (9.7 km) southwest of Henderson Field, to observe the American defenses around Lunga Point. Emplaced artillery on Mount Austen delivered harassing fire on Henderson Field. The hill was also used as a defensive point to protect their positions around the upper Matanikau valley as well as to protect the Maruyama Road, which was a trail used by the Japanese to move men and supplies into the interior of the island. Mount Austen—with a summit of 1,514 ft (461 m)—was not a single peak but a mixed ridgeline of rocky exposed and jungle-covered ridges and hilltops. After the defeat in the Battle for Henderson Field, the Army Section of Imperial General Headquarters directed Hyakutake to increase the numbers of troops and artillery emplaced on the ridgeline to help prepare for the next planned attack on the Americans. Hyakutake directed some of the units that were retreating from the Henderson Field battle area to fortify Mount Austen and nearby hilltops. The forces deployed to Mount Austen included the 124th Infantry Regiment under Colonel Akinosuka Oka and several artillery units. Later, surviving troops from the 230th Infantry Regiment—which had taken heavy losses during the Koli Point action and subsequent retreat—joined Oka's forces around Mount Austen.

=== Reinforcement and resupply ===
On 5, 7, and 8 November, Tokyo Express missions landed most of the 38th Division's 228th Infantry Regiment and the 1st Battalion, 229th Infantry Regiment on Guadalcanal. On 10 November, Japanese destroyers landed Lieutenant General Tadayoshi Sano—commander of the 38th Infantry Division—plus his staff and 600 more troops from the 38th. Hyakutake used the newly arrived troops to help stop an American attack west of the Matanikau from 8–11 November, then sent the 228th and 229th Regiment's units on 11 November to reinforce Oka's forces. Japanese Major General Takeo Itō—commander of the 38th Division's Infantry Group—later took command of the defenses around Mount Austen.

An attempt by the Japanese to deliver the rest of the 38th Division and its heavy equipment failed during the Naval Battle of Guadalcanal on 12–15 November. Only 2,000–3,000 of the remaining 7,000 troops from the division reached the island; most of their supplies, ammunition, and equipment were lost. Because of this failure, the Japanese canceled their next planned attempt to recapture Henderson Field.

As December began, the Japanese experienced considerable difficulty in keeping their troops on Guadalcanal resupplied because of Allied air and naval attacks on the Japanese supply chain of ships and bases. The few supplies delivered to the island were not enough to sustain Japanese troops, who by 7 December were losing about 50 men each day from malnutrition, disease, and Allied ground or air attacks. The Japanese had delivered almost 30,000 soldiers to Guadalcanal since the campaign began, but by December only about 20,000 were still alive, with about 12,000 more or less fit for combat duty. On 12 December, the Japanese Navy proposed that Guadalcanal be abandoned. Despite opposition from Japanese Army leaders who still hoped that Guadalcanal could eventually be retaken, Imperial General Headquarters, with approval from Emperor Hirohito on 31 December, agreed to the evacuation of all Japanese forces from the island and establishment of a new line of defense for the Solomons on New Georgia. The Japanese titled the evacuation effort of their forces from Guadalcanal Operation Ke (ケ号作戦) and planned to execute the operation beginning on 14 January 1943.

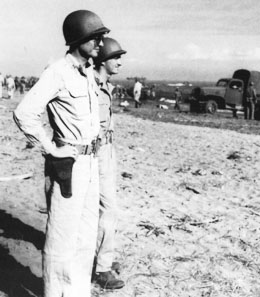
U.S. Army Major General Alexander Patch (foreground) observes the landing of troops and supplies on Guadalcanal on 8 December.

In the meantime, the U.S. continued to deliver additional troops to Guadalcanal. The three infantry regiments of the U.S. Army's Americal Division, the 164th, the 182nd and the 132nd, were delivered to Guadalcanal on 13 October, 12 November, and 8 December, respectively. In addition, the U.S. Army's independent 147th Infantry Regiment plus the 2nd Marine Division's 8th Marine Regiment landed on 4 November. The reinforcements also included additional artillery, construction, aviation, naval, and support units.

On 9 December, U.S. Army Major General Alexander Patch—commanding general of the Americal Division—succeeded Vandegrift as commander of Allied forces on Guadalcanal and Tulagi. That same day, the 5th Marine Regiment departed the island, followed by the rest of the 1st Marine Division by the end of the month. Patch was ordered to eliminate all Japanese forces remaining on Guadalcanal. Patch told his superior—Millard Harmon, who commanded all U.S. Army forces in the South Pacific—that he needed more troops to accomplish his mission. In response, Harmon ordered the 25th Infantry Division, which was in the process of relocating from Hawaii to the South Pacific Area, to ship directly to Guadalcanal. The 25th's units would arrive at Guadalcanal in stages during the last two weeks of December and the first week of January 1943. In addition, the rest of the 2nd Marine Division's units—including the 6th Marine Regiment—were ordered to Guadalcanal during the same time period. By 7 January, American forces on Guadalcanal would total just over 50,000 men.

== Battles ==
=== First Battle of Mount Austen ===
On 12 December 1942, a small group of Japanese soldiers from the 38th Field Engineer Regiment successfully infiltrated the American lines from the south, destroying a fighter aircraft and a fuel truck on Henderson Field before escaping back to friendly lines. Two days later, a U.S. Army patrol from the 132nd Infantry Regiment skirmished with a group of Japanese on the eastern slopes of Mount Austen. On 15 December, in yet another night infiltration raid onto Henderson Field, a Lieutenant Ono led four men equipped with picric acid blocks past American sentry positions, destroying several P-39 Airacobra fighters. Throughout the Guadalcanal campaign, Japanese forces would continue night infiltration tactics against U.S. forces, causing few American casualties.

General Patch, however, was convinced that these events illustrated an unacceptable risk to Henderson Field by Japanese troops stationed on and around nearby Mount Austen. Thus, on 16 December, in preparation for a planned general offensive to try to destroy all Japanese forces remaining on Guadalcanal, Patch elected to first secure the Mount Austen area. He therefore ordered the 132nd Infantry Regiment to immediately seize the objective. While the 132nd Infantry Regiment had little modern combat experience aside from jungle skirmishes and patrols, it was proud of its combat history, having participated in both the Civil War and World War I, and its young reserve officers and non-commissioned officers considered themselves skilled in rifle and machine-gun tactics and marksmanship.

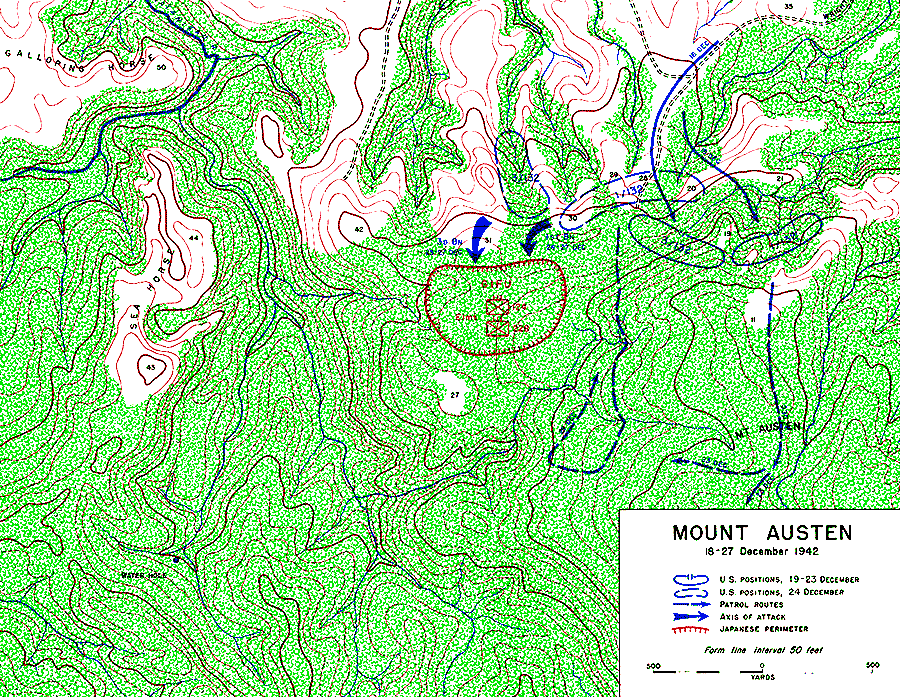
Map of the First Battle of Mount Austen

The 132nd's commander—Colonel Leroy E. Nelson—directed his 3rd Battalion to lead the American assault on the first of several hills, followed by the regiment's 1st Battalion. Artillery support was provided by 105 mm howitzers from the U.S. Army's 246th Field Artillery Battalion and the 75 mm pack howitzers of the 2nd Battalion, 10th Marines.

The exposed hills making up the Mount Austen complex were arbitrarily numbered by the Americans for reference purposes (see map at right). On 17 December, Nelson's 3rd Battalion—commanded by Lieutenant Colonel William C. Wright—advanced south of Hill 35 and began to climb toward Mount Austen's summit near Hills 20 and 21. In order to achieve its timetable set by the division commander, the battalion was forced to leave behind many of its support weapons, such as heavy mortars and machine guns, and to take only limited quantities of ammunition and supplies, all of which had to be hand-carried along hacked-out paths through thick jungle. At 09:30 on 18 December, as Wright's lead elements approached, Japanese defenders pinned down the Americans with machine-gun and rifle fire. Exhausted and dehydrated by their trek through the thick jungle, Wright's troops—unable to deploy quickly out of column formation—made no headway against the Japanese defenses.

The next morning, after an artillery barrage and air strike from the CAF, Wright went forward with several artillery observers to investigate the terrain in front of his forces. Using concealed fire lanes, a Japanese machine-gun team killed Wright with a burst of fire at 09:30. Wright's second in command, Major Louis Franco, was unable to get forward and take command until late in the day, preventing the battalion from continuing the attack. At the same time, Japanese riflemen infiltrated the American positions and effectively harassed the command posts of both the 3rd and 1st Battalions as well as the column of heavily loaded American supply and engineer parties on the hacked-out jungle trail linking the battalions with the Lunga perimeter. Both U.S. battalions dug in for the night while artillery bombarded the Japanese positions.

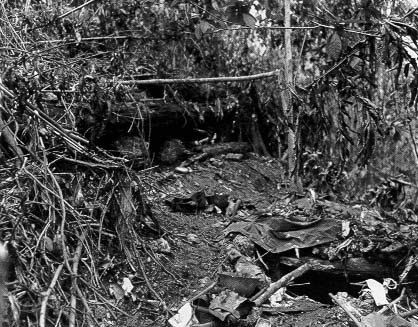
One of the Japanese pillboxes that made up the Gifu position

Between 20 and 23 December, the Japanese apparently withdrew from the area, as aggressive U.S. Army patrols encountered no more enemy in the area of Hills 20 and 21 and further to the south. Nelson ordered the two battalions to move west to Hill 31 and then attack south towards Hill 27. On 24 December, the 3rd Battalion was halted on the slopes of Hill 31 by intense machine-gun fire from well-concealed positions.

=== The Gifu ===
Facing the Americans was the most strongly fortified Japanese position on Guadalcanal, nicknamed the Gifu (after Gifu Prefecture in Japan) by the Japanese. The Gifu position sat between the summits of Mount Austen and Hills 27 and 31 and consisted of a 1,500 yd (1,400 m) line of 45–50 interconnected, mutually supporting, well-camouflaged pillboxes dug into the ground and forming a horseshoe shape with the open end to the west. Only about 3 ft (1 m) of each pillbox was above ground with walls and roofs, constructed from logs and dirt, up to 2 ft (0.6 m) thick. Each pillbox contained one to two machine guns and several riflemen; some were sited underneath huge jungle trees. Each of these pillbox emplacements was sited to provide mutual support to the others. Numerous foxholes and trenches provided additional support and cover for additional riflemen and machine-gunners. Behind the pillboxes, the Japanese had sited 81 mm and long-range 90mm mortars. Though a powerful defensive position, the Gifu still had weaknesses; the western end of it opened into a hook, and the defenders were badly starved and badly undersupplied with ammunition and heavy weapons. The Gifu was commanded by Major Takeyoshi Inagaki with around 500 to 600 men from the 2nd Battalion, 228th Regiment and the 2nd Battalion, 124th Infantry.

Between 25 and 29 December, the Japanese defenders prevented the Americans from making any headway in their attempt to overrun the Gifu position. While the U.S. 3rd Battalion—with artillery support—conducted frontal attacks against the position to pin the defenders, the U.S. 1st Battalion attempted to flank the Gifu on the east. However, as the Japanese defenses were fully integrated, the flanking attempt was unsuccessful. By 29 December, U.S. losses had reached 53 killed, 129 wounded, and 131 sick, though morale remained high.

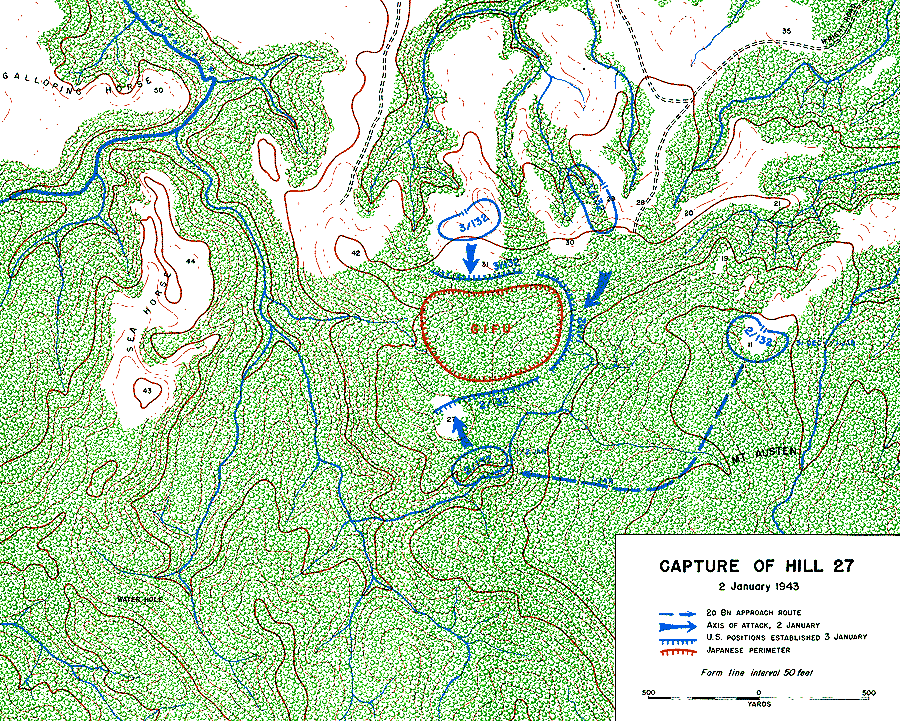
U.S. actions around the Gifu on 2 January

On 2 January, Nelson added his 2nd Battalion—commanded by Lieutenant Colonel George F. Ferry—to the offensive and sent them on a march around the Gifu toward Hill 27. The battalion reached the lower slopes of the hill by 16:00 without meeting serious resistance from the Japanese. This same day, Nelson—who was physically and mentally exhausted and may have been suffering from malaria—was replaced as commander of the 132nd by Lieutenant Colonel Alexander M. George. Sources are unclear whether he requested his own relief or was ordered to relinquish command.

The next day, elements of the 132nd's 2nd Battalion occupied the summit of Hill 27, surprised and killed a Japanese 75 mm artillery crew, and successfully repulsed, with help from heavy artillery fire, six Japanese counterattacks on their positions. By this time, the soldiers atop Hill 27 were running extremely short of ammunition and grenades, with Japanese forces returning ten shots to each one fired by the Americans, and medical supplies were exhausted. The 2nd's efforts to improve its position were made more difficult by the hard coral underneath the hill's sod, which made the digging of foxholes difficult. The remainder of the 2nd Battalion, carrying ammunition, food, and medical supplies, reached Hill 27 and joined the battle, where they soon gained combat superiority over the attacking Japanese. At the same time, with the infusion of new leadership by Lieutenant Colonel George, the 1st and 3rd Battalions attacked and pushed a short way into the Gifu, killing 25 Japanese in the process, then closed the gaps between their units and consolidated their positions, while killing many of the Japanese defenders. One officer from the 2nd Battalion, who had brought his personal sniper rifle to the battle, witnessed the final disintegration of Japanese units attacking Hill 27 with a final flurry of suicidal frontal charges. The Japanese soldiers in the Gifu, who had apparently not been resupplied or replenished during the battle, consumed their last remaining food rations on 1 January.

Since the beginning of its offensive on Mount Austen, the 132nd had lost 115 killed and 272 wounded. The relatively high number of combat deaths were caused in part by wound infections in the tropical conditions and inability to evacuate men wounded in the early stages of the operation. Even after intervention by the 2nd Battalion, wounded men continued to die, unable to withstand the arduous and slippery portage back down improvised jungle trails on a stretcher carried by two men. These losses, plus the effects of tropical diseases, heat, and combat exhaustion, temporarily rendered the 132nd's 1st and 3rd Battalions incapable of further offensive action. Thus, on 4 January, the 1st and 3rd Battalions were ordered to dig in and hold positions surrounding the Gifu on the north, east, and south.

Reviewing the first Mount Austen offensive, Marine officer and historian Samuel B. Griffith concludes, "As the thoroughly butchered Mount Austen operation dragged on into January, it became apparent that both Major General Patch and his assistant Division commander [Brigadier General Edmund Sebree] had much to unlearn, and perhaps even more to learn." However, while Patch's decision to attack Mount Austen was criticized, one participant noted the difficulties faced by the 132nd Regiment and its commanders, including the terrain, limited equipment (light mortars and machine guns with limited ammunition supply, no flamethrowers or pole charges), and the necessity of assaulting thoroughly integrated, prepared, and roofed-over Japanese defenses, which resisted direct hits by 75 mm and in some cases 105 mm shells. For its part, once the 132nd was able to treat its wounded, morale remained high in the newly bloodied regiment, which played a significant role in later combat operations on Guadalcanal. The 2nd Battalion, with just 27 killed, was immediately assigned to further offensive combat operations.

=== Arrival of American reinforcements ===
On 2 January, with the arrival of the U.S. Army's 25th Division and the rest of the U.S. Marine 2nd Division, all of the American units on Guadalcanal and Tulagi were together designated as the XIV Corps with Patch in command. Sebree took over as commander of the Americal Division. On 5 January, Patch issued his plan to begin operations to clear Guadalcanal of Japanese forces. The 2nd Marine Division was to push westward from the Matanikau River along the coast while the 25th Division was to finish clearing Mount Austen and to secure the hilltops and ridges located around the inland forks of the Matanikau. The Americal Division and the 147th Infantry Regiment would guard the Lunga perimeter.

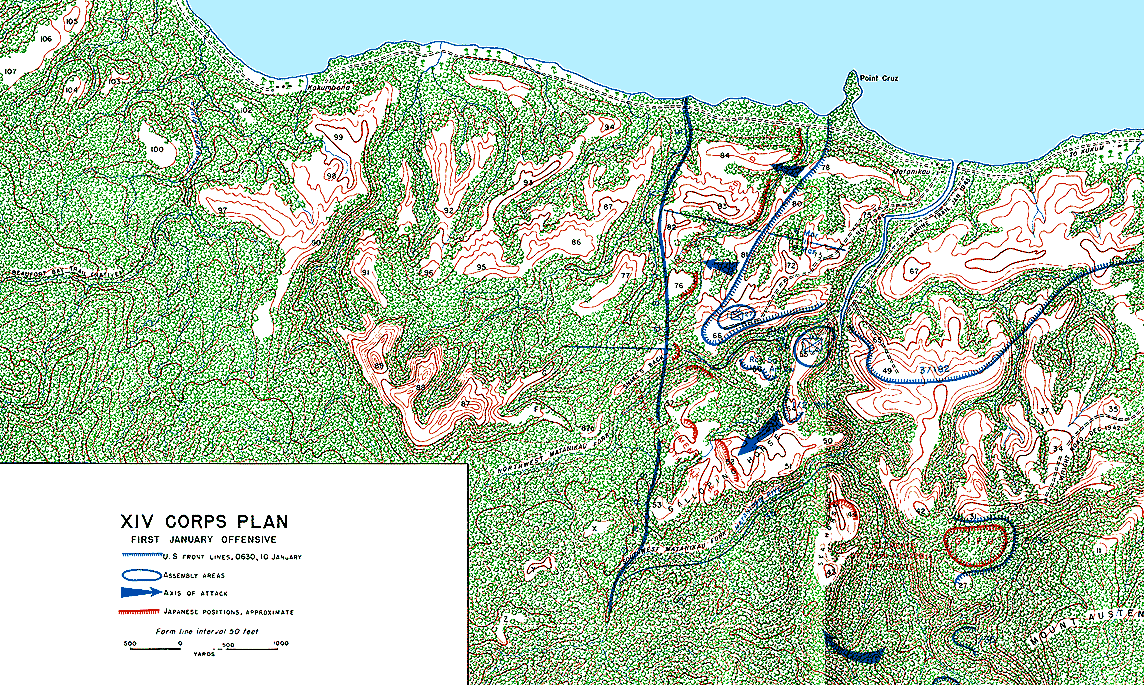
Map of the Matanikau River area showing Japanese (red) and American (blue) positions and the American plan of attack along the coast and into the inland hills

The deep river ravines of the Matanikau's upper forks naturally divided the U.S. 25th Division's operations area into three distinct areas, with one main terrain feature dominating each area. East of the Matanikau was Mount Austen. In the wedge between the southeast and southwest forks of the Matanikau Hills 44 and 43 together formed a terrain feature that the Americans called the "Sea Horse", because of its shape when viewed from above. Between the Matanikau's southwest and northwest forks was a much larger hill mass labelled, also because of its shape, the "Galloping Horse".

Major General J. Lawton Collins—commander of the 25th Division—assigned his 35th Infantry Regiment to clear the Gifu, secure the rest of Mount Austen, and to capture the Sea Horse. He ordered the 27th Infantry Regiment to seize the Galloping Horse from the north. The 35th and the 27th were then to link up on Hill 53 (the Galloping Horse's "Head") to finish clearing the nearby hills and ridges. Collins placed his 161st Infantry Regiment in reserve. Ammunition and supplies for the attacking troops would be transported along rough jeep trails as far forward as possible and then carried the rest of the way by native Solomon Islanders.

Having observed the arrival of the American reinforcements to the island, the Japanese were expecting the offensive. Hyakutake ordered the units on the hilltops around the Matanikau and in the Gifu to hold in place in their prepared positions. The Japanese hoped that as the Americans surrounded and intermingled with the Japanese defensive pockets that the close quarters fighting would prevent the Americans from employing their superior firepower in artillery and close air support. At night, the Japanese planned to infiltrate the American rear areas and interdict their supply lines to prevent the American assault forces from receiving sufficient ammunition and provisions to continue their attacks. The Japanese hoped to delay the Americans long enough for more reinforcements to arrive from Rabaul or elsewhere.

=== Galloping Horse ===
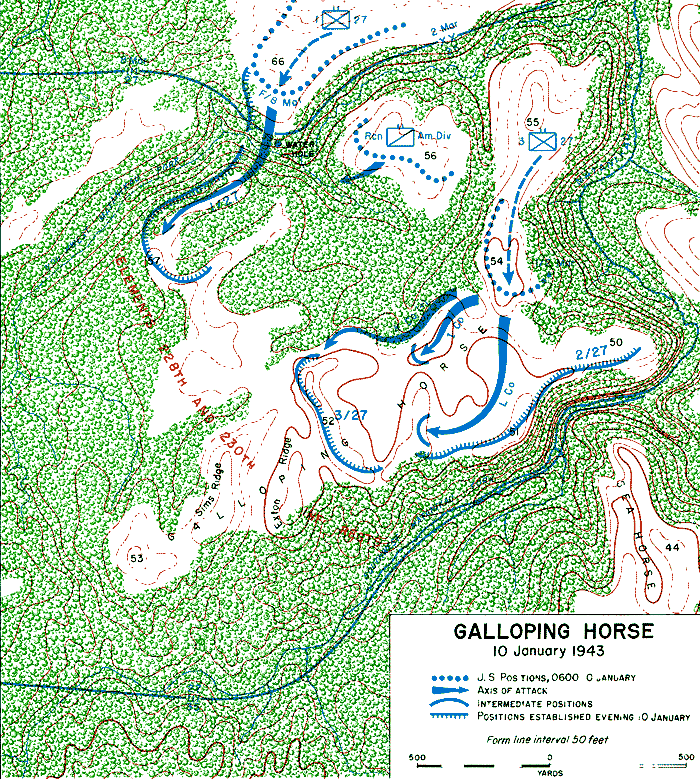
Map of the initial American attacks on the Galloping Horse, 10 January

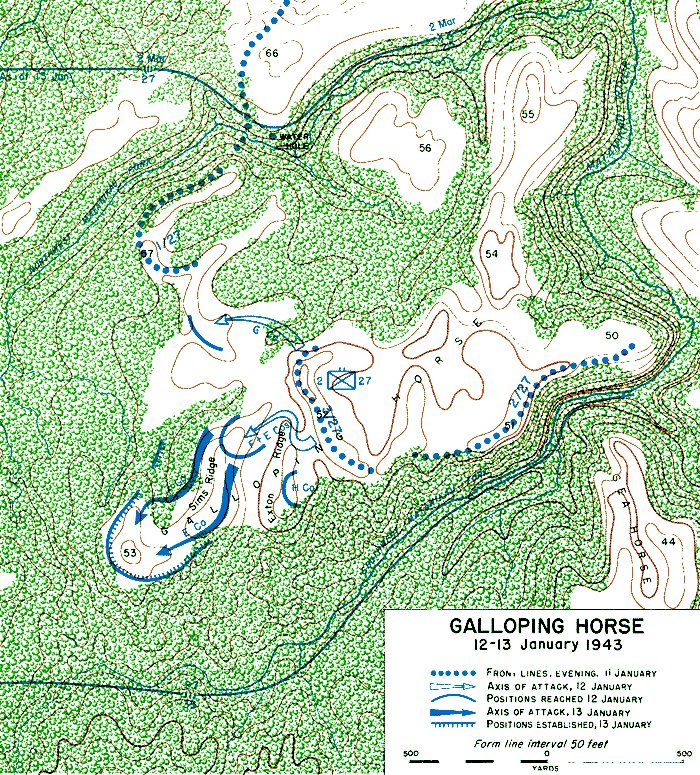
Map of the American attacks on the Galloping Horse, 12–13 January

Viewed from overhead with north upward, the Galloping Horse ridge appeared upside down, with Hills 54 and 55 forming the horse's rear legs, and Hill 57 forming the front legs. From east to west, Hills 50, 51, and 52 formed the horse's body with the 900 ft (270 m) high Hill 53 at the head. Colonel William A. McCulloch—commander of the 27th Regiment—ordered his 1st Battalion to attack Hill 57 and his 3rd Battalion to assault Hills 51 and 52 from Hill 54, which was already in American hands. Defending the Galloping Horse and the nearby fork of the Matanikau were 600 Japanese soldiers from the 3rd Battalion, 228th Infantry Regiment under Major Haruka Nishiyama.

The American attack commenced at 05:50 on 10 January with a bombardment by six battalions of artillery and airstrikes by 24 CAF aircraft on suspected Japanese positions in the valley between Hill 57 and the jumping-off point for the 1st Battalion. Beginning their advance at 07:30, the 1st Battalion successfully gained the summit of Hill 57 by 11:40 against light resistance.

From Hill 54, the 3rd Battalion's attack route was in the open and dominated by the high ground of Hills 52 and 53. At 06:35, the battalion commenced its assault and occupied Hill 51 without resistance. Continuing its advance, the battalion was stopped by heavy Japanese machine-gun fire 200 yd (180 m) short of Hill 52's summit. After an airstrike by six CAF aircraft on Hill 52 and an artillery bombardment, the 3rd Battalion resumed their attack and successfully captured the summit by 16:25, destroying six machine gun positions and killing about 30 Japanese on the hill.

At 09:00 on 11 January, the 3rd Battalion began its attack on Hill 53. The Japanese quickly stopped the American advance with machine-gun and mortar fire. The Americans—who had not received adequate replenishment in water—began to suffer extensive heat casualties. In one platoon, only ten men remained conscious by the afternoon.

The next day, the 27th's 2nd Battalion took over the assault on Hill 53. Advancing up the hill, the Americans were stopped short of Hill 53's summit. During the night, Japanese infiltrators cut the telephone line between the 2nd Battalion and its regimental headquarters, affecting unit communications. On 13 January, the Americans renewed the attack but were again halted by heavy Japanese machine-gun and mortar fire.

A knoll on the south edge of the ridge (the "horse's neck") leading to Hill 53 was the fulcrum of the Japanese defenses. The knoll contained several machine gun and mortar positions which had effectively held off the American attacks across the ridge. The 2nd Battalion's executive officer—Captain Charles W. Davis—volunteered to lead four other men against the knoll. Crawling on their bellies, Davis and his party crept to within 10 yards (9 m.) of the enemy position. The Japanese defenders threw two grenades at them, but the grenades failed to explode. Davis and his men threw eight grenades at the Japanese, destroying several of their positions. Davis then stood up, and while shooting his rifle, then pistol with one hand, waved his men forward with the other as he advanced further onto the knoll. Davis and his men then killed or chased away the rest of the Japanese on the knoll. Silhouetted against the sky during the action, Davis was visible to the Americans all up and down the ridge. Inspired by his actions, plus replenished with water by a sudden thunderstorm, the American troops "came to life" and quickly assaulted and captured Hill 53 by noon. The Americans counted the bodies of 170 Japanese soldiers on and around the Galloping Horse. The Americans suffered fewer than 100 killed.

Between 15 and 22 January, the 161st Infantry Regiment hunted the remainder of Nishiyama's battalion in the nearby gorge of the southwest Matanikau fork. In total, 400 Japanese were killed defending the Galloping Horse and surrounding area. Two hundred Japanese survivors, including Nishiyama, escaped to friendly lines on 19 January.

=== Sea Horse ===
The Sea Horse consisted of two hills, Hill 43 on the south with Hill 44 adjoining to the north. Viewed from overhead with north upward, the Sea Horse ridge appeared upside down, with Hill 43 forming the seahorse's head and Hill 44 forming the abdomen. The American 35th Infantry Regiment, commanded by Colonel Robert B. McClure, was assigned to capture the Sea Horse and complete the reduction of the Gifu on Mount Austen. McClure assigned his 2nd Battalion to the assault on the Gifu and sent his 1st and 3rd Battalions on a long march through the jungle to attack the Sea Horse from the south. Defending the Sea Horse and nearby valleys were the Japanese 124th Regiment's 1st and 3rd Battalions, with Oka's command post located nearby.

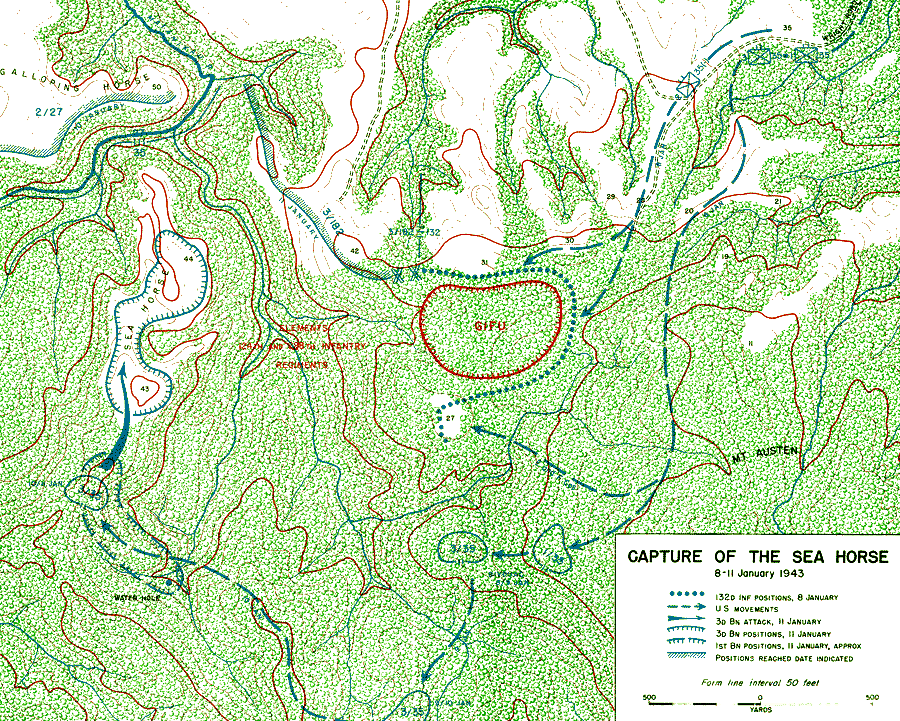
The American march to and assault on the Sea Horse (left)

After taking a 7,000 yd (6,000 m) circuitous route through the jungle around Mount Austen, at 06:35 on 10 January, McClure's 3rd Battalion launched its attack on Hill 43. As the Americans closed on Hill 43 from the south, a group of Japanese soldiers near Oka's command post spotted the U.S. soldiers as they crossed a stream and attacked immediately, threatening the flank of the American column. Two American soldiers—William G. Fournier and Lewis Hall—successfully repelled the Japanese attack with a machine gun but were killed in the process. Making progress against light resistance, the 3rd Battalion dug in for the night about 700 yd (600 m) short of Hill 43's summit.

The next day, the 1st Battalion of the 35th was added to the attack, and the two units—with artillery support—drove through several Japanese machine-gun positions and took Hill 43 by early afternoon. Continuing on towards Hill 44 against light opposition, the Americans captured the rest of the Sea Horse by nightfall, cutting off Japanese forces in the Gifu. The native Solomon Islanders who had been man-packing supplies to the two American battalions during the attack were having difficulty delivering sufficient food and ammunition over the long trail between the Sea Horse and the Lunga perimeter. Thus, B-17 Flying Fortress heavy bombers were used to air drop supplies to the American troops around the Sea Horse.

On 12 January, the two American battalions of the 35th continued their attack to the west toward the Galloping Horse but were stopped by a Japanese strongpoint on a narrow ridge about 600 yd (500 m) west of their point of departure. After trying to flank the position for two days, the Americans were able to smash the strongpoint with mortar and artillery fire, killing 13 Japanese defenders, and they advanced to a ridge overlooking the southwest fork of the Matanikau by 15:00 on 15 January. That same day, Japanese survivors from the Sea Horse battle—including Oka and most of the 124th's headquarters staff section and the 1st Battalion—were able to slip past the American forces and reach friendly lines further west. The Americans counted 558 Japanese dead around the Sea Horse, mostly from the 124th's 3rd Battalion, and captured 17.

=== Second Mount Austen / Attack on the Gifu ===
A renewed attack was made on the Gifu on January 9, comprising the 35th infantry, commanded by Col. Ernest Peters, which replaced the 132nd Infantry Regiment, as the latter had suffered substantial losses attacking the Gifu, and made no headway. The 132nd passed its incomplete and inaccurate maps as well as estimates of 100 defenders and 'two known machine guns' infusing the Gifu. Peters set the date of 15th January for a general attack, and the 10th for advancing the front line with the limited objective of providing better protection for the supply trail to Hill 27 as well as feeling out Japanese positions, but grenades and gunfire repulsed each advance. Peters quickly raised the estimate of the defenders of the Gifu to 400 soldiers and twenty machineguns. Patrol actions resumed for the next several days, while the Japanese mounted customary night infiltrations. The attack was supplanted with a preliminary bombardment by mortars and artillery, but crumbled quickly in face of Japanese resistance. Peters was subsequently relieved of command and replaced with Maj. Stanley R. Larsen, who made a reconnaissance of the Gifu and quickly concluded that the Japanese had a strong ring of well-camouflaged, mutually-supporting pillboxes. Based on his assessment, he made an extended and tightly woven line from Hill 27 to Hill 42 to invest the entire Gifu, and also prepared a massive bombardment of the Gifu on the 17th.

By 13 January, the 2nd Battalion had lost 57 killed or wounded. The battle casualties plus malaria reduced the battalion to 75% of its effective strength by the next day. To assist the battalion, the 35th Regiment's anti-tank gun company personnel were attached to the battalion as infantry.

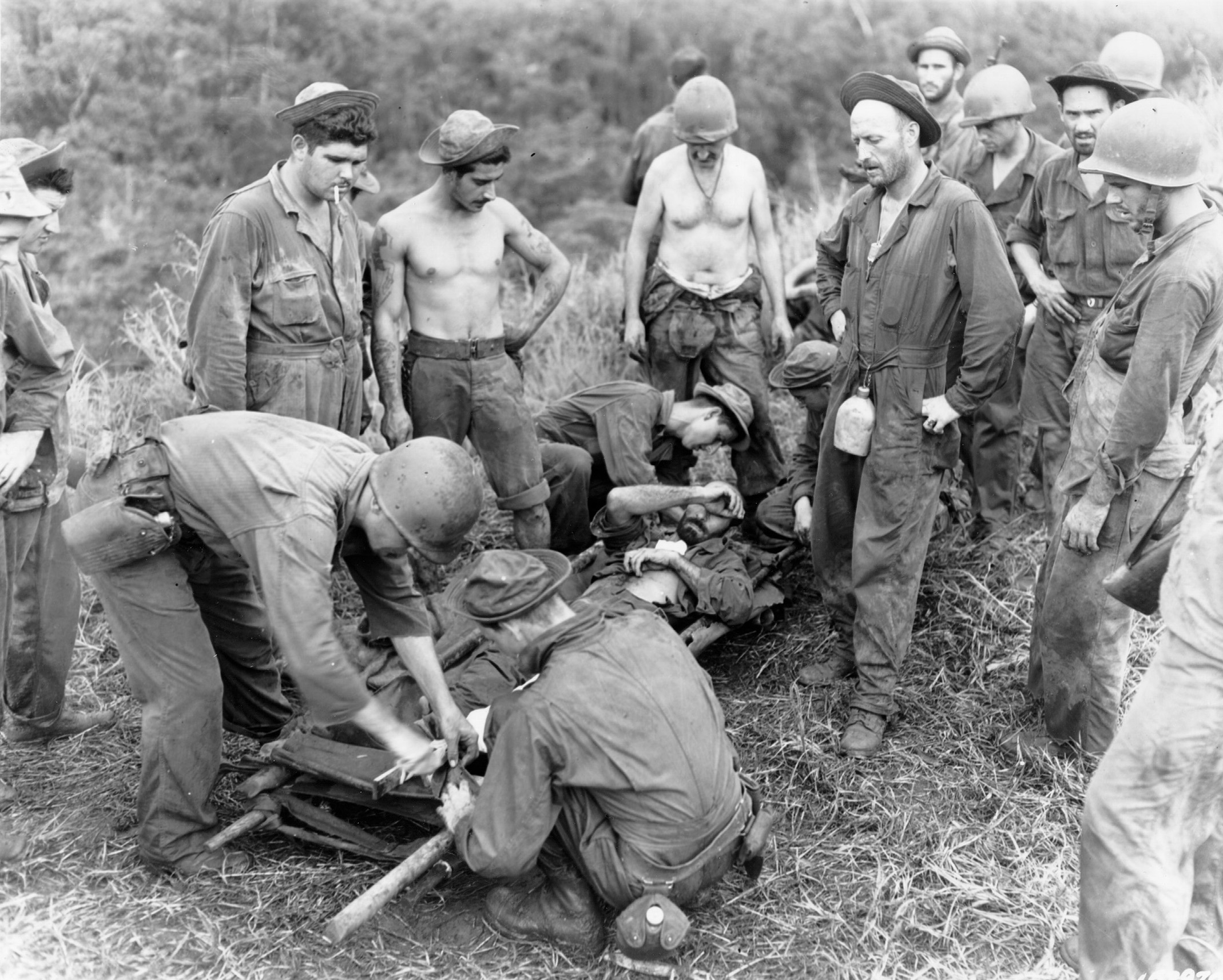
A wounded American soldier from the 35th Infantry Regiment is prepared for evacuation from the battle area on 15 January.

With the capture of the Sea Horse by the Americans, the Japanese in the Gifu were isolated from the rest of the 17th Army. In a last message over his field phone before the line was cut, Inagaki refused an order from Oka to abandon his position and attempt to infiltrate back to friendly lines, instead vowing that his command would "fight to the last". Inagaki apparently refused the order because to do so would have meant leaving his sick and injured men behind.

An American attack on the Gifu by the entire 2nd Battalion on 15 January was completely repulsed by the Japanese. In response, McClure relieved Peters of command on 16 January and replaced him with Major Stanley R. Larsen. Larsen decided to completely surround the Gifu and try to reduce it with a massive artillery bombardment on 17 January.

In the meantime, the Americans used a loudspeaker to broadcast a surrender appeal in Japanese to the Gifu's defenders. Only five Japanese soldiers responded. One of the five reported that his company actually gathered to discuss the appeal but decided not to surrender because they were too weak to carry their injured, non-ambulatory comrades with them to the American lines. Instead, they elected to perish together as a unit. One Japanese officer defending the Gifu wrote in his diary, "I heard the enemy talking in Japanese over a loud speaker. He is probably telling us to come out—what fools the enemy are. The Japanese Army will stick it out to the end. Position must be defended in all conditions with our lives."

At 14:30 on 17 January, twelve 155 mm and thirty-seven 105 mm guns opened fire on the Gifu. Over the next one and a half hours, the American artillery fired 1,700 shells into an area about 1,000 yd (1,000 m) square. Because of the lateness of the hour, the Americans were unable to follow the barrage with an immediate attack but instead had to wait until the next day, which allowed the Japanese time to recover. On 18 January, the Americans attacked into the weaker west side of the Gifu, making some headway and destroying several Japanese pillboxes over the next two days until heavy rain stopped the attack on 20 January, The 20th was passed in heavy rain, with Japanese units feeling for weak spots in the American lines. That night, eleven Japanese were killed trying to escape from the Gifu.

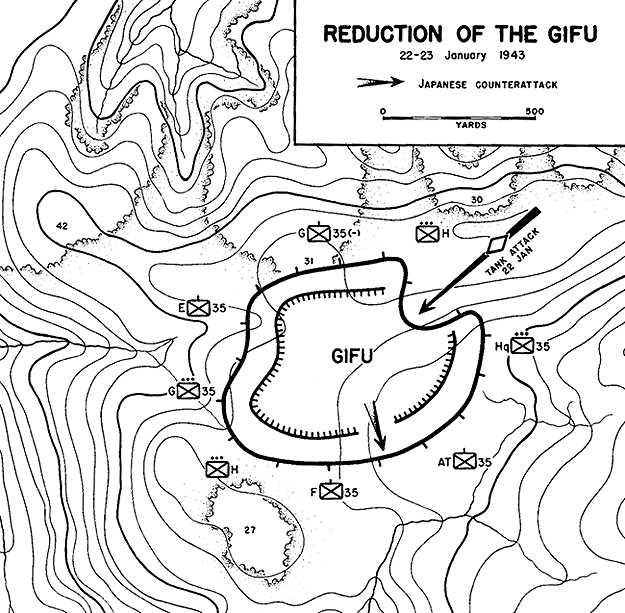
Tank support cracks the Gifu for American forces.

On the 22nd three Marine Stuart Light tanks were released from the 25th Division Reconnaissance squad, though the rigorous trail to the Gifu pocket left only one operational, the Americans were able to move the Stuart light tank up their supply trail to Mount Austen. The tank proved to be the decisive factor in the battle. At 10:20, the tank—protected by 16–18 riflemen—blasted three Japanese pillboxes, including one that sustained four hits from 37mm explosive shells before crumbling, and penetrated into the Gifu pocket. Proceeding onward, the tank completely traversed the Gifu and destroyed five more pillboxes, breaching a gap 200 yd (180 m) wide in the Japanese line. The American infantry surged through the gap and took positions in the middle of the Gifu.

That night around 02:30 on 23 January, apparently realizing the battle was lost, Inagaki led his staff and most of the remaining survivors of his command—about 100 men—in a final charge on the Americans. In the charge, Inagaki and the remainder of his troops were killed almost to the last man. At sunrise, the Americans secured the rest of the Gifu.

Sixty-four men from the American 2nd Battalion, 35th Infantry were killed during the assaults on the Gifu between 9 and 23 January, bringing the total number of Americans killed taking Mount Austen to 175. The Americans counted the bodies of 431 Japanese in the remains of the Gifu's fortifications and 87 elsewhere around Mount Austen. Total Japanese losses in the Sea Horse and both Mount Austen battles were probably between 1,100 and 1,500 men.

Losses among the Gifu defenders are unknown but were estimated by one 2nd Battalion officer as of 9 January 1943 at 431 killed and wounded; most of the latter would later die of their wounds when combined with illness and starvation. A Japanese officer's recovered diary stated that the Japanese had suffered heavy casualties. Japanese prisoners captured in later operations referred to the combat at Hills 27 and 31 as The Battle of the Mountain of Blood. American troops killed during the offensive on the Gifu totaled 175 across five battalions, with a large number of wounded. John B. George, a Junior Infantry officer who served with the 132nd infantry in the Gifu wrote; "most of us who have fought in the Pacific are ready to admit here and now, away from all the convincing firsthand evidence we have seen — mass starvation, untold suffering, shell shock, cannibalism, mass suicide— that for sheer, bloody, hardened steel guts, the stocky and hard-muscled little Jap doughboy has it all over any of us."

=== Coastal drive ===
At the same time that the U.S. Army offensive was taking place in the hills around the upper Matanikau, the U.S. 2nd Marine Division—under the command of Brigadier General Alphonse DeCarre—was attacking along the north coast of Guadalcanal. Facing the Marines in the hills and ravines south of Point Cruz were the remains of the Japanese 2nd Infantry Division, commanded by Lieutenant General Masao Maruyama, plus the 1st Battalion, 228th Infantry Regiment from the 38th Infantry Division under Major Kikuo Hayakawa.

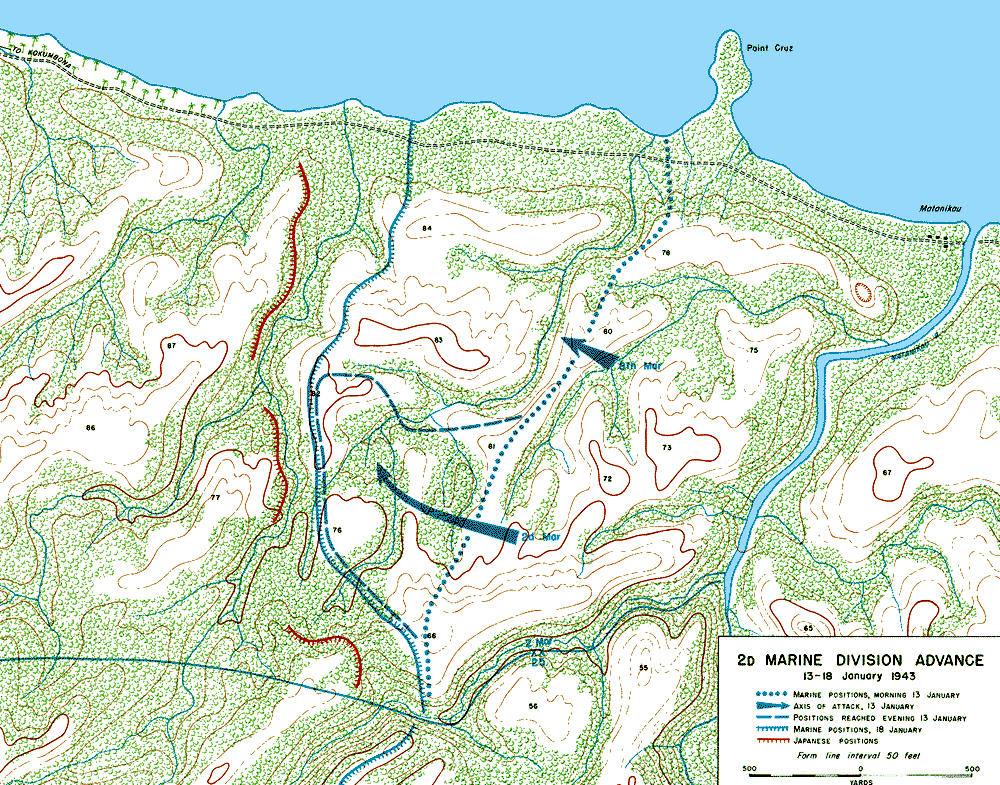
U.S. Marine drive along the coast

On 13 January, the 2nd and 8th Marine regiments began their offensive with the 8th Marines attacking along the coast and the 2nd Marines advancing further inland. The Japanese were pushed back in some places but held in others, with heavy fighting occurring at several locations in the hills and ravines near the coast. On 14 January, the 2nd Marines were relieved by the 6th Marine Regiment under the command of Colonel Gilder D. Jackson.

The Marines renewed the offensive on 15 January. The Japanese stymied the 8th Marines' advance along the coast. Inland, however, the 6th Marines were able to successfully advance about 1,500 yd (1,400 m) and threatened the flank of the Japanese forces emplaced in front of the 8th Marines. At 17:00, Maruyama ordered his troops to retreat to a pre-coordinated line about 1,300 yd (1,200 m) to the west.

Early on 16 January, as many of Maruyama's men attempted to comply with the order to retreat, the 6th Marines turned and drove to the coast, trapping most of Maruyama's 4th and 16th Regiments between themselves and the 8th Marines. By 14:00 on 17 January, the Marines had destroyed the Japanese forces trapped in the pocket, killing 643 and capturing two.

== Aftermath ==
On 15 January, an IJA representative from Rabaul reached Guadalcanal on a Tokyo Express mission and informed Hyakutake of the decision to withdraw Japanese forces from the island. Grudgingly accepting the order, the 17th Army staff communicated the Ke evacuation plan to their forces on 18 January. The plan directed the 38th Division to disengage and withdraw towards Cape Esperance on the western end of Guadalcanal beginning on 20 January. The 38th's retirement would be covered by the 2nd Division and other units, which would then follow the 38th westward. Any troops unable to move were encouraged to kill themselves to "uphold the honor of the Imperial Army". From Cape Esperance the Japanese navy planned to evacuate the army forces over the last few days of January and first week of February with a projected completion date of the evacuation of 10 February.

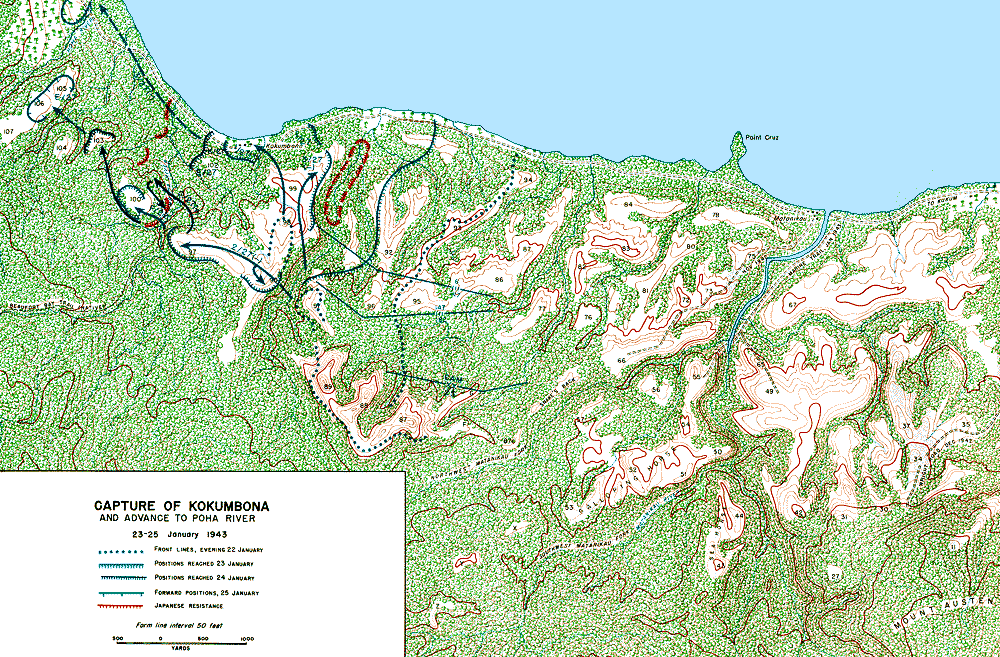
American advance westward, 23–25 January

The U.S. and its Allies mistook Japanese preparations for Ke as another reinforcement attempt. With this in mind, Patch ordered his forces to launch another offensive against the Japanese forces west of the Matanikau. On 21 January, the 27th and 161st Regiments pushed westward from the area of the Galloping Horse. The Americans—unaware that the 38th Division was withdrawing in preparation to evacuate the island—were surprised to encounter light resistance. Advancing more quickly through the inland hills and ridges than the Japanese had anticipated, by 22 January the Americans were in position to capture Kokumbona on the coast, headquarters of the 17th Army, and completely cut off the remainder of the 2nd Division.

Reacting quickly to the situation, the Japanese hurriedly evacuated Kokumbona and ordered the 2nd Division to retire westward immediately. The Americans captured Kokumbona on 23 January. Although some small Japanese units were trapped between the American forces and destroyed, most of the 2nd Division's survivors escaped.

Over the next week, the Japanese rear-guard—assisted by difficult terrain—effectively delayed the American advance westward from Kokumbona. General Patch—still believing that a Japanese reinforcement effort was imminent—kept most of his forces back to guard Henderson Field, sending only one regiment at a time to continue the advance. Thus, the majority of the surviving Japanese army forces was able to gather at Cape Esperance by the end of January. On 1, 4, and 7 February, Japanese warships successfully evacuated 10,652 army troops from the island. On 9 February, the Americans discovered that the Japanese were gone and declared Guadalcanal secure.

In hindsight, some historians have faulted the Americans—especially Patch and Admiral William Halsey, commander of Allied forces in the South Pacific—for not taking advantage of their ground, aerial, and naval superiority to prevent the successful Japanese evacuation of most of their surviving forces from Guadalcanal. Halsey had been recently repulsed at the Battle of Rennell Island. Patch and Harmon's insistence on taking Mount Austen has been cited as one of the factors that delayed the American's main attack to the west, giving the 17th Army a chance to escape. Said Merrill B. Twining of the Japanese forces deployed on and around Mount Austen, "Theoretically these Japanese did offer a threat to our major force advancing westward along the coast, but as a practical matter these isolated groups were composed of sick and starving men unable to do anything more than die in place. Under the circumstances disclosed by subsequent events, it is obvious that Mt. Austen was just part of the scenery and of no significant import to either of the antagonists."

Nevertheless, the larger successful campaign to recapture Guadalcanal from the Japanese was an important strategic victory for the U.S. and its allies. Building on their success at Guadalcanal and elsewhere, the Allies continued their campaign against Japan, ultimately culminating in Japan's surrender and the end of World War II.
