= Tadayoshi Sano =

Japanese military commander

- 佐野 忠義
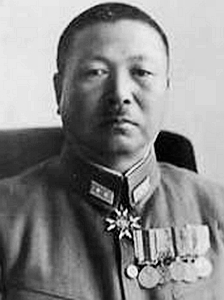
- Born: 7 March 1889; Shizuoka Prefecture, Japan
- Died: 3 July 1945 (aged 56); Sendai, Miyagi, Japan
- Military career
- Allegiance: Empire of Japan
- Branch: Imperial Japanese Army
- Service years: 1911–1945
- Rank: Lieutenant General
- Commands: 38th Division, IJA 34th Army
- Conflicts: World War II; Battle of Hong Kong; Dutch East Indies campaign; Guadalcanal campaign

Tadayoshi Sano (佐野 忠義, Sano Tadayoshi; 7 March 1889 – 3 July 1945) was a lieutenant general and commander in the Imperial Japanese Army (IJA) during World War II.

== Biography ==
=== Early career ===
Sano was born in Shizuoka Prefecture. He attended the 23rd class Imperial Japanese Army Academy and graduated in 1911. He served as a junior officer with the IJA 16 Field Artillery Regiment. In 1913, he attended the IJA's Artillery and Engineering school, graduating in 1914, and graduated from the 31st class of the Army Staff College in 1922. He was promoted to major in 1926, he was assigned as a military attaché to Great Britain from 1927 through 1928.

From August 1931, Sano was assigned to the IJA 4th Field Artillery Regiment and from January 1933 was assigned to the staff of the Hiroshima-based IJA 5th Division, He was promoted to colonel and commanded the IJA 25th Field Artillery Regiment from March 1935. From December 1935 Sano was assigned to the staff of the Kokura-based IJA 12th Division. He once again commanded the IJA 25th Artillery from March 1936.

With the start of the Second Sino-Japanese War, Sano served as Chief of Staff of the IJA 14th Division from August 1937. Under the command of Lieutenant General Kenji Doihara, the division participated in the Beiping–Hankou Railway Operation and in the Northern and Eastern Honan campaign including the Battle of Lanfeng. In July 1938, Sano was promoted to major general and transferred to command the IJA 4th Heavy Field Artillery Brigade. He became commandant of the Army Field Artillery School from August 1940. In March 1941, he was promoted to lieutenant general.

=== Pacific War ===
==== Hong Kong and Sumatra ====
In 1941, Sano assumed command of the IJA 38th Division. Early in the Pacific War, Sano and his division participated in the Battle of Hong Kong by invading Hong Kong Island on 18 December 1941. The British garrison surrendered on 25 December 1941. Sano's troops were reported to have committed atrocities against civilians in Hong Kong and British prisoners of war (Major General Takeo Itō, Sano's subordinate and commander of the 38th's Infantry Group, was tried and convicted after the war for war crimes). The division then transferred to Sumatra and participated in the Netherlands East Indies campaign.

==== Guadalcanal ====
The 38th Division was then transferred to Rabaul, New Britain in the Southwest Pacific in September 1942 in order to participate in the Japanese attempts to retake Guadalcanal from Allied forces during the Guadalcanal campaign. Two battalions from Sano's division were delivered to Guadalcanal by Tokyo Express missions in October 1942 and participated in the Battle for Henderson Field, which resulted in a decisive defeat for the Japanese forces.

In November 1942, Tokyo Express missions delivered the 38th Division's 228th Infantry Regiment to Guadalcanal along with Sano and his staff. The Japanese attempted to deliver the remaining 7,000 troops of the 38th Division by slow transport but the effort was defeated during the Naval Battle of Guadalcanal from 12 November through 15 November 1942. Only about 3,000 of Sano's troops successfully reached the island and most of their supplies and heavy equipment were lost. After suffering losses during the Battle of Mount Austen, the Galloping Horse, and the Sea Horse, Sano and the remainder of his troops on Guadalcanal, about 2,316 men, were evacuated during Operation Ke on 2 February 1943, giving control of the island completely to Allied forces.

==== Japan, China, and death ====
After returning to Rabaul with his troops, Sano was reassigned to Japan and assigned as Chief of Staff of the General Defense Command (GDC) in June 1943. The GDC administered all IJA line and training units in the Japanese home islands and Korea. He then served on the General Staff from March 1944.

Sano returned to the China theatre of operations as commander of the IJA 34th Army in Hankou in July 1944. This was a newly formed army in Hebei province, in Japanese-occupied China created out of reserve elements of the IJA 11th Army to protect Japanese rear lines when the IJA 11th Army moved south to participate in the Battle of Guilin–Liuzhou during Operation Ichi-Go. Afterwards, it was transferred to the operational control of the Japanese Sixth Area Army, and continued in its role as a garrison force for Wuhan and the surrounding region. In January 1945, Sano was attached to the staff of the China Expeditionary Army. Sano became ill and died in Sendai, Japan on 3 July 1945.
