= Yoshimitsu =

Yoshimitsu may refer to:

== People ==
- Yoshimitsu Abe (1868–1969)
- Yoshimitsu Aragaki (新垣 吉光; born 1949), Japanese boxer
- Yoshimitsu Banno (1931–2017)
- Yoshimitsu Fukuzawa (福沢 義光; born 1963), Japanese golfer
- Yoshimitsu Kadowaki (門脇 慶充; born 1953), Japanese bobsledder
- Yoshimitsu Morita (1950–2011)
- Yoshimitsu Nishimoto (西本 宣充; born 1968), Japanese weightlifter
- Yoshimitsu Shimoyama (born 1976)
- Yoshimitsu Takashima (born 1941)
- Yoshimitsu Yamada (born 1938)
- Ashikaga Yoshimitsu (1358–1408), the Muromachi shōgun
- Minamoto no Yoshimitsu (1045–1127), the Heian period samurai

== Characters ==
- Yoshimitsu (Tekken), a ninja character in the Tekken series;
- Yoshimitsu, a ninja character in the Soulcalibur series, see Characters of the Soulcalibur series
