= Thirty-Fourth Army (Japan) =

Japanese Thirty Fourth Army
- Active: 3 July 1944 - 15 August 1945
- Country: Empire of Japan
- Branch: Imperial Japanese Army
- Type: Infantry
- Role: Corps
- Garrison/HQ: Wuhan. China
- Nickname(s): 呂武
- Engagements: Soviet invasion of Manchuria

The Japanese 34th Army (第34軍, Dai Sanjū-yon gun) was an army of the Imperial Japanese Army during the final stages of World War II.

== History ==
The IJA 34th Army was formed in Hebei province, in Japanese-occupied China on 3 July 1944 from the Wuhan Defense Army (武漢防衛軍, Bukan Bōei-gun), a force created out of reserve elements of the IJA 11th Army to protect Japanese rear lines when the IJA 11th Army moved south to participate in the Battle of Guilin–Liuzhou during Operation Ichi-Go. Afterwards, it was transferred to the operational control of the Japanese Sixth Area Army, and continued in its role as a garrison force for Wuhan and the surrounding region. In March 1945, it participated in counter-insurgency operations with the IJA 12th Army and in June was transferred to the operational control of the Kwantung Army. The following month, it completed a transfer from China to Hamhung, in northern Korea, where it was assigned border patrol against possible incursions by the Soviet Union into Korea and part of southern Manchukuo. It was overrun by the Soviet Red Army during the Soviet invasion of Manchuria at the end of World War II.

== List of commanders ==
=== Commanding officer ===
	Name	From	To
1	Lieutenant General Tadayoshi Sano	5 July 1944	12 January 1945
2	Lieutenant General Senichi Kushibuchi	12 January 1945	September 1945

=== Chief of staff ===
	Name	From	To
1	Major General Masataka Kaburagi	7 July 1944	12 June 1945
2	Major General Taro Kawame	15 June 1945	September 1945
