= Lewis Hall (soldier) =

United States Army Medal of Honor recipient

Lewis R. Hall
- Born: March 2, 1895; Bloom Township, Ohio, US
- Died: January 10, 1943 (aged 47); Mount Austen, Guadalcanal
- Burial place: Glen Rest Memorial Estate, Reynoldsburg, Ohio
- Military career
- Allegiance: United States
- Branch: United States Army
- Rank: Technician Fifth Grade
- Units: 35th Infantry Regiment, 25th Infantry Division
- Conflicts: World War II
- Awards: Medal of Honor

Lewis R. Hall (March 2, 1895 – January 10, 1943) was a United States Army soldier and a recipient of the United States military's highest decoration—the Medal of Honor—for his actions in World War II.

== Biography ==
Hall joined the Army from Obetz, Ohio, and by January 10, 1943, was serving as a technician fifth grade in Company M, 35th Infantry Regiment, 25th Infantry Division. During a Japanese attack on that day, at Mount Austen, Guadalcanal, in the Solomon Islands, he refused an order to withdraw after many men in his unit had been killed or wounded and, with fellow soldier Sergeant William G. Fournier, stayed behind to man a machine gun. Hall was killed at the gun, while Fournier was badly wounded and died three days later. Both men were posthumously awarded the Medal of Honor on June 5, 1943.

Hall, aged 47 at his death, was buried in Glen Rest Memorial Estate, Reynoldsburg, Ohio.

== Medal of Honor citation ==
Technician Fifth Grade Hall's official Medal of Honor citation reads:

For gallantry and intrepidity above and beyond the call of duty. As leader of a machinegun squad charged with the protection of other battalion units, his group was attacked by a superior number of Japanese, his gunner killed, his assistant gunner wounded, and an adjoining guncrew put out of action. Ordered to withdraw from his hazardous position, he refused to retire but rushed forward to the idle gun and with the aid of another soldier who joined him and held up the machinegun by the tripod to increase its field of action he opened fire and inflicted heavy casualties upon the enemy. While so engaged both these gallant soldiers were killed, but their sturdy defense was a decisive factor in the following success of the attacking battalion.

== Awards and decorations ==

1st row	Medal of Honor	Purple Heart	Army Good Conduct Medal
2nd row	American Campaign Medal	European–African–Middle Eastern Campaign Medal with 1 campaign star	World War II Victory Medal

== See also ==
- List of Medal of Honor recipients
- List of Medal of Honor recipients for World War II
