= Takeo Itō =

Japanese officer, war criminal 1889-1965

- 伊東 武夫
- Born: July 6, 1889; Fukuoka, Japan
- Died: February 24, 1965 (aged 75); Japan
- Military career
- Allegiance: Empire of Japan
- Branch: Imperial Japanese Army
- Service years: 1911–1945
- Rank: Lieutenant general
- Unit: IJA 38th Division
- Commands: IJA 228th Infantry Regiment; IJA 114th Infantry Regiment; IJA 38th Division (Infantry group); Itō Detachment; 40th Independent Mixed Brigade
- Conflicts: Second Sino-Japanese War; World War II; Battle of Hong Kong; Battle of Ambon; Battle of Timor; Guadalcanal campaign; Matanikau Offensive; Battle of Mount Austen, the Galloping Horse, and the Sea Horse; Operation Ke

Takeo Itō (伊東 武夫, Itō Takeo; 6 July 1889 – 24 February 1965) was a general in the Imperial Japanese Army during World War II.

== Biography ==
Takeo Itō was born in the city of Fukuoka in the Fukuoka Prefecture. The commanding officer of the IJA 228th Infantry Regiment at the start of the Second Sino-Japanese War, he assumed command of IJA 114th Infantry Regiment in August 1940. Upon attaining the rank of major general on August 25, 1941, Itō was given command of the IJA 38th Division's infantry group, which was the primary Japanese division in the invasion of Hong Kong.

In early 1942, Itō was reassigned to an independent command in his own name, the "Itō Detachment", consisted mainly of 228th Infantry Regiment, 38th Infantry Division and the 1st Kure SNLF, which took part in the Battle of Ambon in the Dutch East Indies (30 January–3 February 1942), and in the occupation of Timor. All of these campaigns were characterized by extreme ruthlessness and the massacre of prisoners.

In November, Itō, along with one regiment of the 38th Division, was shipped to Guadalcanal. On 11 November, during the pivotal Guadalcanal campaign, Itō was positioned by Lieutenant-General Harukichi Hyakutake to attack Marines under the command of United States General Alexander Archer Vandegrift who were involved in the Matanikau Offensive against Japanese positions. However, Vandegrift called off his offensive that day after receiving intelligence reports of Hyakutake's plans. Itō later helped command 38th Division troops during the Battle of Mount Austen, the Galloping Horse, and the Sea Horse. He and the 38th's survivors on Guadalcanal were evacuated by the Japanese navy during the first week of February 1943. Itō became commander of the 40th Independent Mixed Brigade, stationed at New Ireland on 8 July 1944. He was promoted to lieutenant-general on November 26 of that year.

At the end of the war, Itō was taken into custody by Australian forces, and was tried as a war criminal in a military tribunal for the murder of Chinese civilians. He was sentenced to death at Rabaul, New Britain on 24 May 1946. However, Ito was released on 28 October, and sent to Hong Kong. In 1948, Itō was accused of war crimes at the Hong Kong's War Crimes Court, found guilty and sentenced to 12 years in prison. He died on 24 February 1965.

== See also ==
- Japanese war crimes
  - St. Stephen's College massacre, committed by the IJA 38th Division under Itō
