= Nomasu Nakaguma =

- 中熊 直正
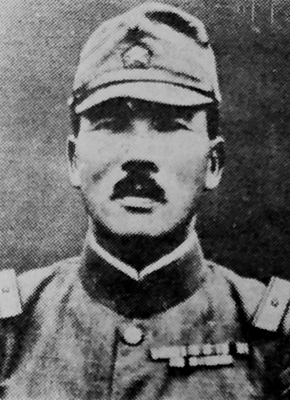
- Born: July 18, 1893; Kumamoto Prefecture, Japan
- Died: November 7, 1942 (aged 49); Guadalcanal, Solomon Islands
- Military career
- Allegiance: Empire of Japan
- Branch: Imperial Japanese Army
- Rank: Colonel
- Unit: IJA 2nd Division
- Commands: 4th Infantry Regiment
- Conflicts: World War II; Pacific War; Guadalcanal campaign; Actions along the Matanikau; Battle for Henderson Field; Matanikau Offensive †

Nomasu Nakaguma (中熊 直正, Nakaguma Nomasu; July 18, 1893 – November 7, 1942) also known as Naomasa or Tadamasu Nakaguma, was a colonel and a commander in the Imperial Japanese Army during the Pacific campaign of World War II. He commanded the 2nd Infantry Division's 4th Infantry Regiment during the strategically significant Guadalcanal campaign. His regiment suffered heavy losses during the Matanikau actions and the decisive Japanese defeat in the Battle for Henderson Field in October 1942, and further losses during the Matanikau Offensive in November 1942. Nakaguma was killed by American artillery fire on or around November 7, 1942.
