= St. Stephen's College massacre =

1941 massacre in Hong Kong by Japan

- Part of World War II
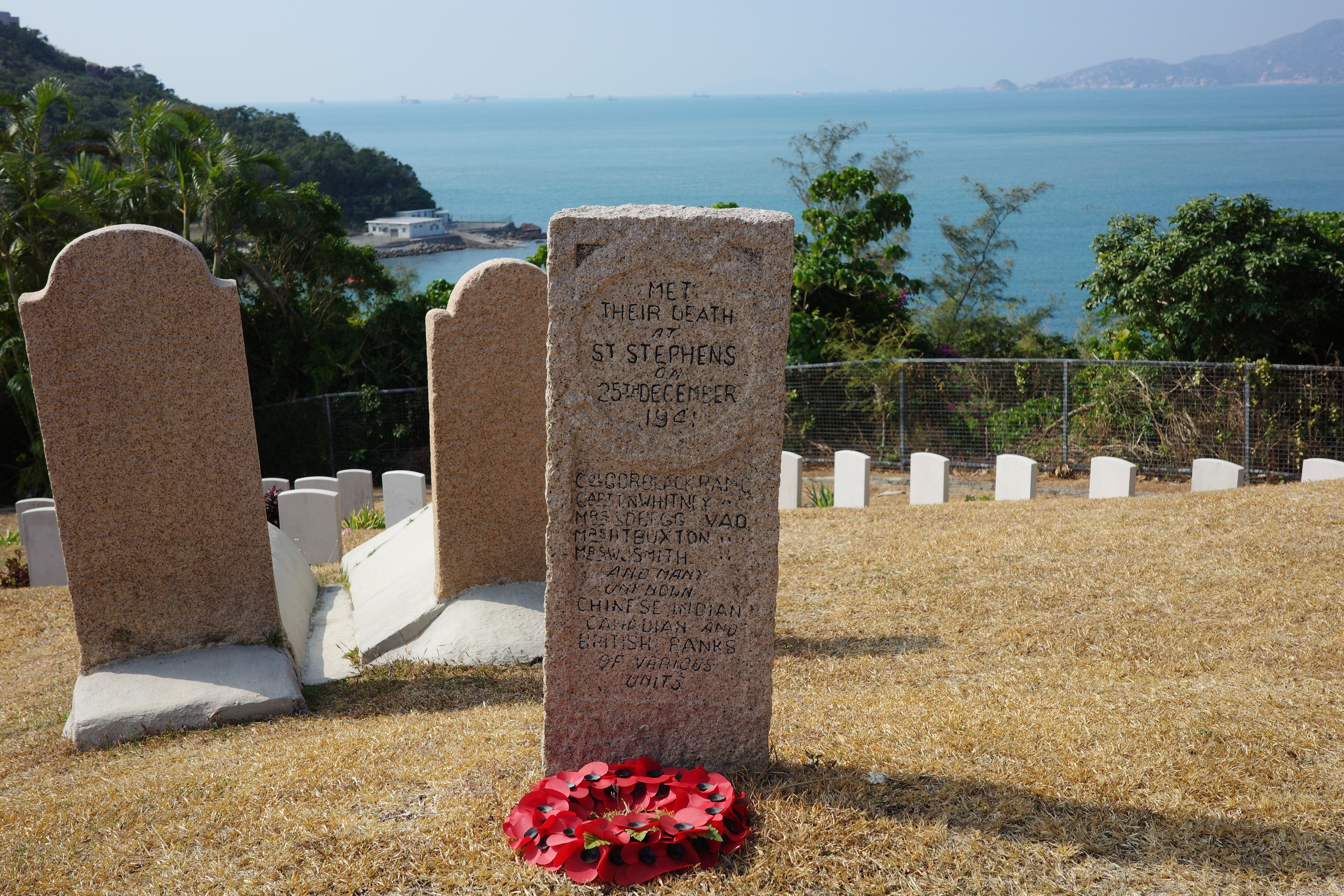
- The memorial to the victims of the St Stephen's College massacre at the Stanley Military Cemetery
- Location: St. Stephen's College, Hong Kong
- Date: 25 December 1941
- Target: Wounded British, Canadian and Indian soldiers and Nurses
- Attack type: Massacre, mutilation, gang rape
- Deaths: 100
- Perpetrator: 38th Division of the Imperial Japanese Army

St. Stephen's College massacre
- Traditional Chinese: 聖士提反書院大屠殺
- Simplified Chinese: 圣士提反书院大屠杀
Transcriptions
Standard Mandarin
- Hanyu Pinyin: Shèng Shìtífǎn Shūyuàn Dàtúshā
Yue: Cantonese
- Yale Romanization: Sing sih tàih fáan syū yuhn daaih tòuh saat
- Jyutping: Sing3 si6 tai4 faan2 syu1 jyun6*2 daai6 tou4 saat3

The St. Stephen's College massacre involved a series of war crimes committed by the Imperial Japanese Army on 25 December 1941 at St Stephen's College during the Japanese occupation of Hong Kong.

== Incident ==
Several hours before the British surrendered on Christmas at the end of the Battle of Hong Kong, Japanese soldiers entered St. Stephen's College, which was being used as a hospital on the front line at the time. The Japanese were met by two doctors, Black and Witney, who were marched away, and were later found dead and mutilated. They then burst into the wards and bayoneted a number of British, Canadian and Indian wounded soldiers who were incapable of hiding. The survivors and their nurses were imprisoned in two rooms upstairs. Later, a second wave of Japanese troops arrived after the fighting had moved further south, away from the school. They removed two Canadians from one of the rooms, and mutilated and killed them outside. Many of the nurses next door were then dragged off to be gang raped, and later found mutilated. The following morning, after the surrender, the Japanese ordered that all these bodies should be cremated just outside the hall. Other soldiers who had died in the defence of Stanley were burned with those killed in the massacre, making well over 100 altogether.

== Aftermath ==
When the college and the grounds of Stanley Prison became a civilian internment camp, the internees gathered up the burnt remains, shards of bones, buttons and charred effects from the cremation, and then buried them. A gravestone marks the spot where these items were interred at Stanley Cemetery.

Lieutenant General Takeo Itō (伊東 武夫), the commander of the 38 Infantry Division during the incident, was held responsible for the atrocities committed by the unit. He was found guilty on the Military Court for the Trial of War Criminals in 1948 and was sentenced to twelve years of imprisonment.
