= Mount Austen =

- Suburb
- Location in Guadalcanal
- Coordinates: 9°26′S 159°57′E
- Country: Solomon Islands
- Province: Honiara Town
- Island: Guadalcanal
- Elevation: 29 m (95 ft)
- Time zone: UTC+11 (UTC)

Mount Austen is a suburb of Honiara, Solomon Islands and is located South of Kukum.

Mt. Austen is a natural area.

== See also ==
- Battle of Mount Austen, the Galloping Horse, and the Sea Horse
