= William G. Fournier =

U.S. Army soldier (1913–1943)

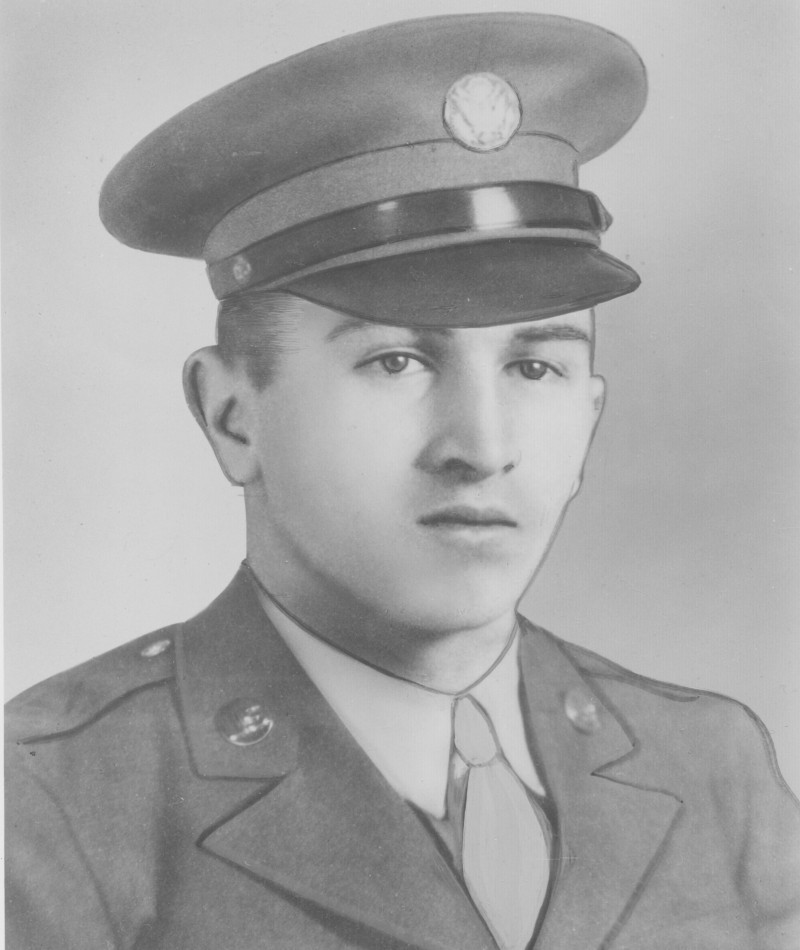
- Born: June 21, 1913; Norwich, Connecticut, US
- Died: January 13, 1943 (aged 29); Guadalcanal, Solomon Islands
- Burial place: National Memorial Cemetery of the Pacific, Honolulu, Hawaii
- Military career
- Allegiance: United States
- Branch: United States Army
- Service years: 1940–1943
- Rank: Sergeant
- Units: 35th Infantry Regiment, 25th Infantry Division
- Conflicts: World War II
- Awards: Medal of Honor

William Grant Fournier (June 21, 1913 – January 13, 1943) was a United States Army soldier and a recipient of the United States military's highest decoration—the Medal of Honor—for his actions in World War II.

== Biography ==
Fournier was raised by his aunts and uncles in the town of South Kingstown, Rhode Island and enlisted in the Navy in 1931, at the age of 18, where he served for nearly a decade before retiring.

Fournier re-enlisted in the military before the beginning of World War II, this time in the Army, from Winterport, Maine in September 1940, and by January 10, 1943, was serving as a Sergeant in Company M, 35th Infantry Regiment, 25th Infantry Division. During a Japanese attack on that day, at Mount Austen, Guadalcanal, in the Solomon Islands, he refused an order to withdraw after many men in his unit had been killed or wounded and, with fellow soldier Technician Fifth Grade Lewis Hall, stayed behind to man a machine gun. Hall was killed at the gun, while Fournier was badly wounded and died three days later. Both men were posthumously awarded the Medal of Honor on June 5, 1943.

Fournier, aged 29 at his death, was buried at the National Memorial Cemetery of the Pacific in Honolulu, Hawaii.

== Medal of Honor citation ==
Sergeant Fournier's official Medal of Honor citation reads:

For gallantry and intrepidity above and beyond the call of duty. As leader of a machinegun section charged with the protection of other battalion units, his group was attacked by a superior number of Japanese, his gunner killed, his assistant gunner wounded, and an adjoining guncrew put out of action. Ordered to withdraw from this hazardous position, Sgt. Fournier refused to retire but rushed forward to the idle gun and, with the aid of another soldier who joined him, held up the machinegun by the tripod to increase its field action. They opened fire and inflicted heavy casualties upon the enemy. While so engaged both these gallant soldiers were killed, but their sturdy defensive was a decisive factor in the following success of the attacking battalion.

== Awards and decorations ==

Badge	Combat Infantryman Badge		
1st row	Medal of Honor	Bronze Star Medal	Purple Heart
2nd row	Army Good Conduct Medal	Navy Good Conduct Medal	American Defense Service Medal
3rd row	American Campaign Medal	Asiatic-Pacific Campaign Medal with one bronze campaign star	World War II Victory Medal

== See also ==
- List of Medal of Honor recipients
- List of Medal of Honor recipients for World War II
