= Tadashi Sumiyoshi =

- 住吉 正
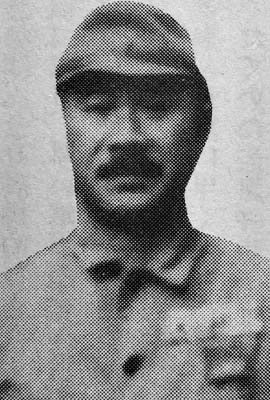
- Born: February 10, 1893; Kisa, Hiroshima, Japan
- Died: March 24, 1976 (aged 83)
- Military career
- Allegiance: Empire of Japan
- Branch: Imperial Japanese Army
- Service years: 1914–1945
- Rank: Major General
- Conflicts: Second Sino-Japanese War; World War II; Guadalcanal campaign

Tadashi Sumiyoshi (住吉 正, Sumiyoshi Tadashi; February 10, 1893 – March 24, 1976) was a major general in the Imperial Japanese Army during the Pacific campaign in World War II.

== Biography ==
Sumiyoshi was born in Kisa, Hiroshima (now part of the city of Miyoshi) and attended military preparatory schools in Hiroshima. He graduated from the 26th class of the Imperial Japanese Army Academy in May 1914. He specialized in artillery operations, and went on to graduate from the 35th class of the Army Staff College in 1923.

After serving in various staff positions at the Imperial Japanese Army General Staff, as an instructor at the Artillery School and even in a barrage balloon regiment, Sumiyoshi was promoted to colonel and appointed commander of the IJA 3rd Heavy Field Artillery Brigade in March 1938, and saw combat in the Second Sino-Japanese War. He rose to the position of senior staff officer for artillery in the Kwantung Army in December 1939 and was vice commandant of the Army Artillery School from December 1940.

In March 1941, Sumiyoshi was promoted to major general and commander of the divisional artillery of the IJA 3rd Division in July 1941. At the time, the division was till heavily involved in the fighting in China, participating in the First Battle of Changsha in September 1941 and Second Battle of Changsha in December 1941, and the Zhejiang-Jiangxi Campaign in May 1942, In September 1942, he was transferred to command the heavy artillery of the IJA 17th Army during the strategically significant Guadalcanal campaign in the Solomon Islands, including the Battle for Henderson Field. Surviving the Japanese defeat on Guadalcanal, Sumiyoshi was withdrawn to Tokyo in April 1943 placed in the staff of the Eastern District Army until October of that year. This was essentially a home guard and garrison, responsible for recruitment and civil defense training to ensure the security of Tokyo, Yokohama, and the surrounding areas. He went into the reserves from October 1943.

However, in August 1944, he was recalled to active duty and placed in command of the artillery of the Eastern District Army. He retired again in June 1945.
