= Yoshimitsu Abe =

Japanese officer in World War II

- 阿部芳光 / あべ・よしみつ
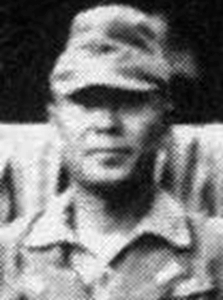
- Born: 1898; Ehime Prefecture, Japan
- Died: 1969 (aged 70–71)
- Military career
- Allegiance: Empire of Japan
- Branch: Imperial Japanese Army
- Service years: 1920-1945
- Rank: Major General
- Commands: Hiroshima Railroad Area
- Conflicts: World War II

Major General Yoshimitsu Abe (阿部芳光, Abe Yoshimitsu; 1898–1969) was a senior officer in the Imperial Japanese Army during World War II.

== Military career ==
From	To	Appointment
DD.MM.YYYY	26.05.1920	Military Academy
12.12.1920	29.11.1933	Army War College
02.12.1940	23.03.1943	Chief of Staff 38th Division
23.03.1943	08.07.1944	Instructor at the Infantry School
08.07.1944	26.05.1945	Chief of Staff, Inland Railroad Command
26.05.1945	DD.MM.YYYY	Hiroshima Railroad Area Commander

== Ranks Promotions ==
Date of Award	Military Rank
26.12.1920	2nd Lieutenant
01.03.1941	Colonel
10.06.1945	Major General
