= 38th Division (Imperial Japanese Army) =

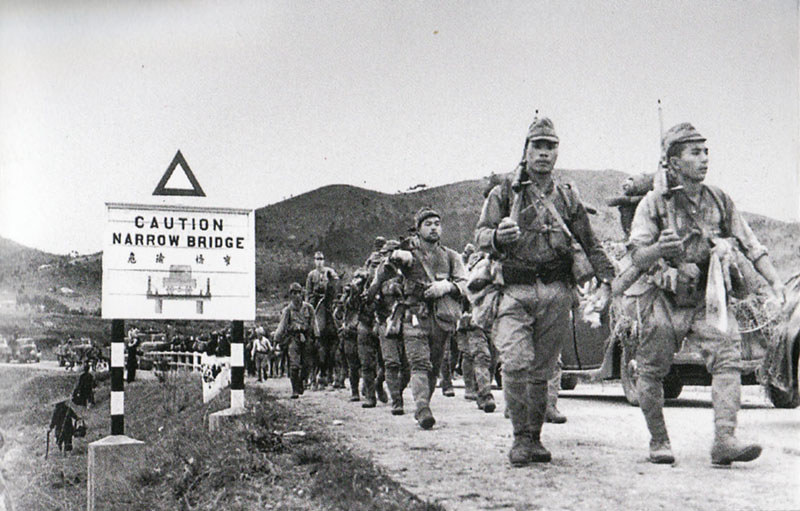
- Soldiers of the 228th Regiment of 38th Division entering Hong Kong, December 1941
- Active: 1939–1945
- Country: Empire of Japan
- Branch: Imperial Japanese Army
- Type: Infantry
- Garrison/HQ: Nagoya, Japan
- Nickname: Swamp Division
- Engagements: Battle of Hong Kong; Dutch East Indies campaign Guadalcanal campaign New Georgia Campaign; New Britain campaign Admiralty Islands campaign

Commanders
- Notable commanders: Tadayoshi Sano; Yoshimitsu Abe; Takeo Itō

The 38th Division (第38師団, Dai sanjūhachi shidan) was an infantry division of the Imperial Japanese Army, activated 30 June 1939 in Nagoya, simultaneously with the 39th, 40th and 41st Divisions. Its call sign was the Swamp Division (沼兵団, Numa Heidan).

== Action ==
The division was initially assigned in October 1939 to the 21st Army to provide security services in Guangdong province in the wake of Imperial Army's Canton Operation. On 9 February 1940 the 21st Army was dissolved and 38th Division was reassigned to South Army. On 28 June 1941 the South Army was also dissolved and the 38th Division was incorporated into the 23rd Army.

The division saw heavy action during the Pacific campaign of World War II. Its main combat units were three infantry regiments: the 228th, 229th and 230th. These were supported by the 38th Mountain Artillery Regiment, the 38th Engineer Regiment, the 38th Transport Regiment and a tankette company.

Initially, the division participated in conquest of Hong Kong in 1941. On 4 January 1942, the 38th Division was assigned to the 16th Army and its 230th Infantry Regiment (converted for this occasion into the 3rd Mixed Regiment) took part in the Battle of Java (1942). In November 1942 the 3rd Battalion of the 229th Infantry Regiment was sent to participate in the New Guinea campaign, where, by January 1943, it was completely decimated following multiple engagements on the island chain with Australian forces.

The remnants of the division fell back to Rabaul after these losses and took part in the fortification of the port. From October 1942 to February 1943, the rest of 38th Division also took heavy losses in the Guadalcanal Campaign and was thereafter assigned to the defense of the New Georgia, the Admiralty Islands, New Britain, and New Ireland occupational garrisons until the end of the war. In particular, the 229th Infantry Regiment participated in the New Georgia Campaign throughout July and August. The majority of the 38th Division capitulated after the surrender of Japan on 15 August 1945 in Rabaul.

The division's soldiers were accused of committing war crimes during their operations in the Pacific theater. One of the division's senior officers, Takeo Itō, was convicted of war crimes by an Allied military tribunal after the war.

== See also ==
- Japanese war crimes
  - St. Stephen's College massacre, committed by the 38th Division
- List of Japanese Infantry Divisions
