= Julian N. Frisbie =

United States Marine Corps general

Julian Neil Frisbie
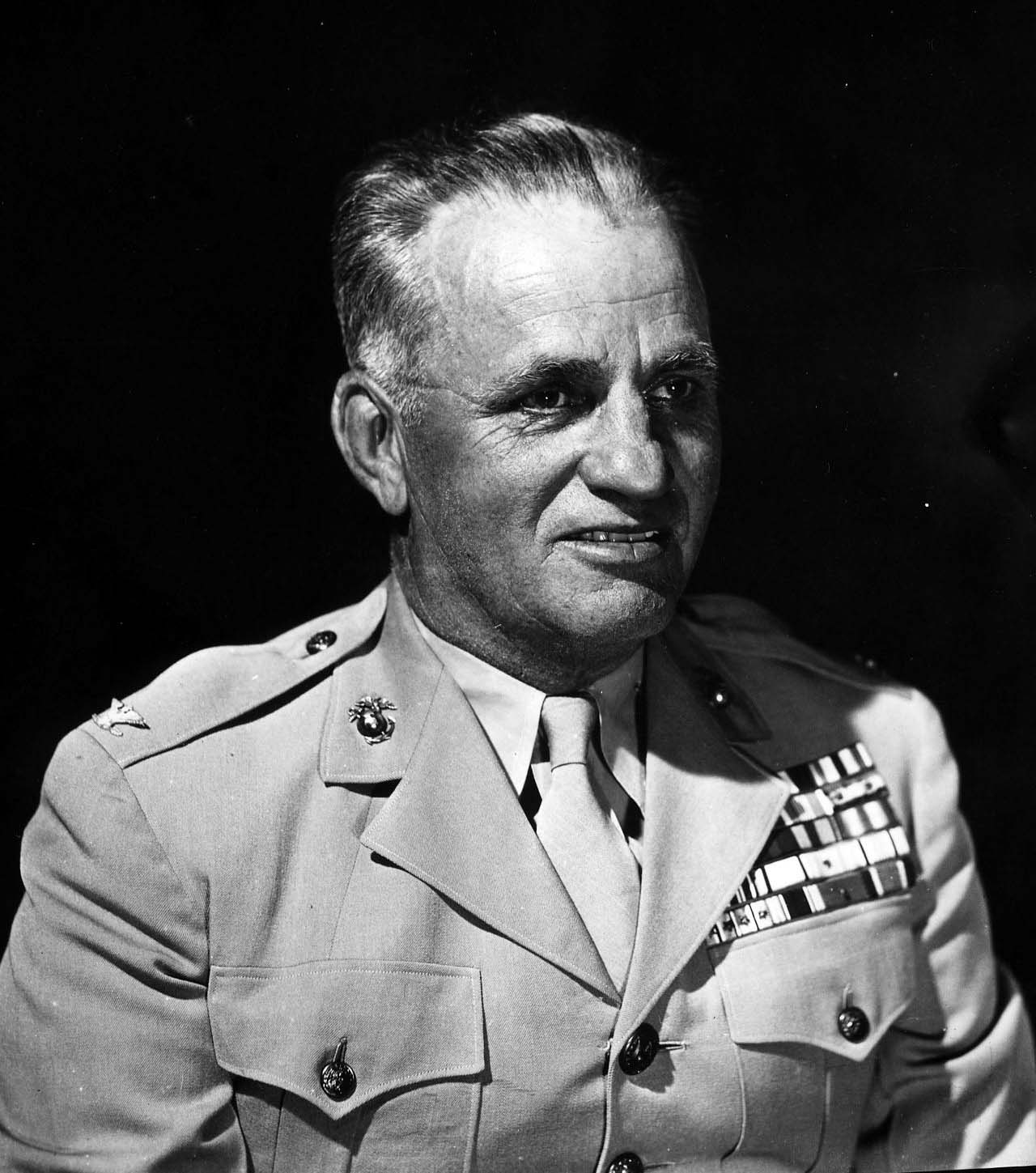
- Julian N. Frisbie as colonel, USMC
- Born: November 30, 1894; Virden, Illinois, US
- Died: April 28, 1963 (aged 68); Oakland, California, US
- Burial place: Golden Gate National Cemetery
- Military career
- Allegiance: United States of America
- Branch: United States Marine Corps
- Service years: 1917–1948
- Rank: Brigadier general
- Service number: 0-313
- Commands: Portsmouth Naval Prison; 7th Marine Regiment; 5th Marine Regiment; CoS of 1st Marine Division
- Conflicts: World War I; Banana Wars; Dominican intervention; Nicaraguan intervention; World War II; Guadalcanal Campaign; Operation Cartwheel; Solomons campaign; Battle of Cape Gloucester; Chinese Civil War; Operation Beleaguer
- Awards: Navy Cross; Silver Star; Legion of Merit
- Other work: Warden of Southern Michigan Prison

Julian Neil Frisbie (November 30, 1894 – April 28, 1963) was a highly decorated officer of the United States Marine Corps with the rank of brigadier general, who is most noted for his service as commanding officer of the 7th Marine Regiment during the Battle of Cape Gloucester and later as warden of Southern Michigan Prison during 1952 riots.

== Early career ==
Frisbie was born on November 30, 1894, in Virden, Illinois. He attended Illinois College in Jacksonville, Illinois, and graduated with a bachelor's degree in chemistry in 1917. Frisbie enlisted in the Marine Corps in June 1917 and quickly reached the rank of sergeant. He was subsequently appointed drill instructor at a training center within Marine Barracks Parris Island, South Carolina, and was decorated with the Marine Corps Good Conduct Medal for his service there.

In August 1918, Frisbie was assigned to the Officer Candidates School at Marine Barracks Quantico, Virginia. He graduated from the officer's course on December 15, 1918, and was commissioned second lieutenant on the same date. His first assignment as an officer was with 15th Marine Regiment, which was sent to suppress rebels in Dominican Republic at the end of February 1919.

During his time in Dominican Republic, Frisbie was transferred to the staff of the 2nd Provisional Marine Brigade, where he was appointed aide to the commanding general, Brigadier General Logan Feland. He returned to the United States in July 1921 and subsequently was appointed officer in charge of the Marine Corps Recruiting Station in Cincinnati, Ohio. While serving there, he was promoted to the rank of first lieutenant on October 21, 1922.

Frisbie was transferred to the Marine detachment aboard submarine tender USS Savannah in June 1924 and participated in the cruise to the Gulf of Mexico and later to Hawaii. In April 1925, his detachment was transferred to another submarine tender, USS Camden, and he served with this ship within East Coast of the United States. Frisbie served with USS Camden until May 1926, when he was transferred back to Marine Barracks Quantico, Virginia. He subsequently served there on the staff of the commanding general of Marine Corps Expeditionary Force and participated in the Fleet exercises at Guantanamo Bay, Cuba. After return from Cuba, Frisbie served at Quantico Base as assistant to the athletic officer.

He was subsequently assigned again to the 2nd Provisional Marine Brigade and sailed for Nicaragua, where he fought the rebel forces of Augusto César Sandino. For his service during the combat around the village of Santa María, he was decorated with the Nicaraguan Presidential Medal of Merit with Star and Diploma. Frisbie returned to the United States in March 1930 and was assigned to the Marine barracks within Naval Air Station Pensacola, Florida. After two years of service there, he attended the Company Officers's course at Marine Corps School at Quantico Base in June 1932.

After his graduation, Frisbie was transferred to the Marine Corps Base San Diego, California, and after a brief period of service, he was assigned to Marine detachment aboard the cruiser USS Louisville. While serving there, he was promoted to the rank of captain and transferred to the battleship USS Colorado.

Frisbie was back at Marine Base San Diego in June 1935, and, due to his experiences at sea, he was appointed commander of the Sea School Detachment within the San Diego base. He was later appointed base adjutant under the command of Major General Douglas C. McDougal. Frisbie was transferred to the Paymaster Department within Headquarters Marine Corps in Washington, D.C., in January 1938. Promotion to major became effective in March 1938, and Frisbie was appointed post paymaster at Marine Barracks Parris Island, South Carolina, at the same time.

== World War II ==
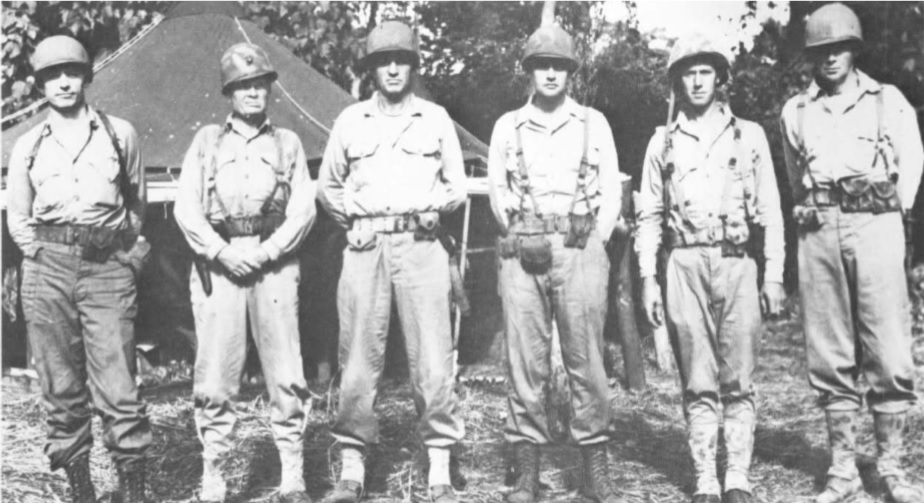
Senior officers of 7th Marines at New Britain, January 1944. From left to right: LTC Conoley (C.O., 2nd Battalion), LTC Chesty Puller (Regimental X.O.), COL Frisbie (Regimental C.O.), LTC Buse Jr. (C.O., 3rd Battalion), LTC Weber (C.O., 1st Battalion) and CPT John E. Buckley (Commanding Regimental Weapons Company).

In April 1941, Major Frisbie was assigned to the 1st Marine Division located at Marine Barracks New River, North Carolina under the command of Major General Holland Smith. He was subsequently appointed commanding officer of the 3rd Battalion, 7th Marine Regiment. During his service in this capacity, Frisbie was promoted to the rank of lieutenant colonel in July 1941. Following the Japanese Attack on Pearl Harbor, 1st Marine Division was deployed to the South Pacific, and Frisbie himself was appointed regimental executive officer in February 1942.

Frisbie served in this capacity with distinction during the Guadalcanal Campaign, and for his efforts and gallantry in action during the defense combat in Lunga Area in late 1942, Frisbie was decorated with the Silver Star. He remained in this capacity until June 22, 1943, when he relieved Colonel Amor L. Sims as commanding officer of the 7th Marine Regiment. His regiment was sent to Australia for rest and refit after heavy fighting at Solomon Islands.

Frisbie commanded the regiment during the next few months of intensive training and preparation for new deployment. During his time in Australia, he was promoted to the rank of colonel in October 1943. Weeks later, he led his regiment during the bloody Battle of Cape Gloucester in New Britain. Colonel Frisbie commanded the initial landing and securing of the beachhead and later defeated Japanese 141st Infantry Regiment. For his actions during the battle, he was decorated with the Navy Cross.

He was relieved by Colonel Herman H. Hanneken on 20 February 1944 and sent back to the United States and assigned to Headquarters Marine Corps. Following one month of duties there, he was transferred to San Diego, where he was appointed commanding officer of the Training Camp within Camp Pendleton.

== Later career ==
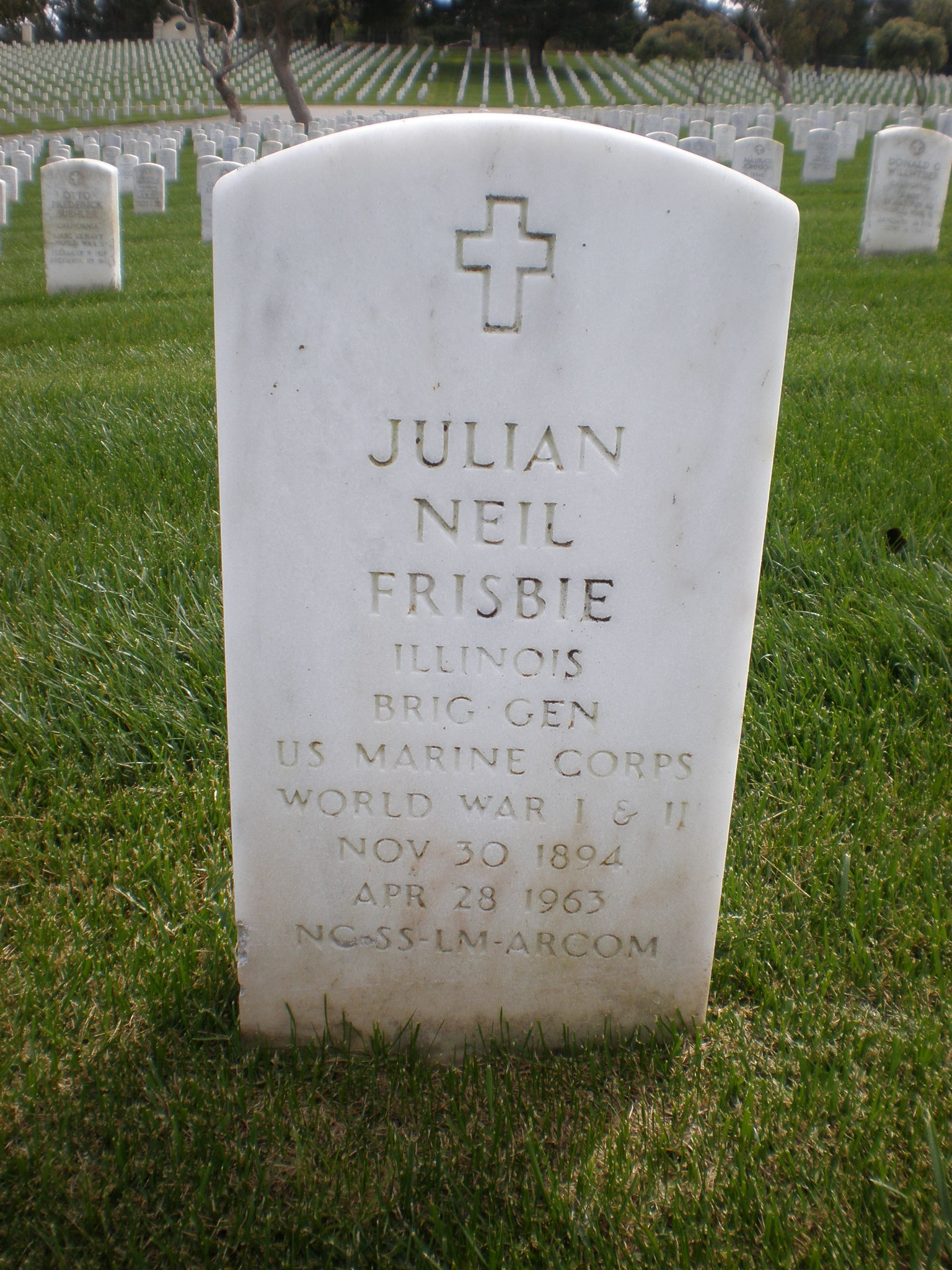
The Gravestone of Frisbie at Golden Gate National Cemetery in San Bruno, California.

Colonel Frisbie was assigned back to his well-known 1st Marine Division in June 1945. He was appointed commanding officer of the 5th Marine Regiment on June 25 and led his regiment to Tianjin, China. For his part in the occupation of North China, Frisbie was decorated with the Legion of Merit and Commendation Medal by the army and with Order of the Cloud and Banner, 5th Grade by the Government of Republic of China.

He commanded 5th Marines until October 15, 1945, when he was transferred to the staff of 1st Marine Division and appointed its chief of staff. Frisbie returned to 5th Marines on July 16, 1946, and commanded this regiment until the end of May 1947, when it was ordered to Guam and reassigned to 1st Provisional Marine Brigade under the command of Brigadier General Edward A. Craig. Frisbie was subsequently appointed 1st Brigade chief of staff on June 1, 1947.

After spending almost three months in this capacity, Frisbie returned to the United States in August 1947 and was appointed commanding officer of the Portsmouth Naval Disciplinary Barracks. He finally retired from the Marine Corps on November 1, 1948, and was advanced to the rank of brigadier general on the retired list for having been specially commended in combat.

== Civil career ==
Following his retirement from the Marine Corps, Frisbie was appointed warden of the Southern Michigan Prison in Jackson, Michigan. The position very similar to his last one in the Marine Corps. In April 1952, two prisoners from the maximum-security prison wing overpowered a guard and released other inmates in their cell block. They took 10 guards as hostages, and after damaging several prison wings they demanded an end to alleged guard's brutality, a change in the parole system, better living conditions and guarantee of no reprisals and other concessions in the exchange for their surrender. Frisbie led the negotiations and finally helped to secure all hostages and establish order again.

Frisbie died of a heart attack on April 28, 1963, at Oak Knoll Naval Hospital and is buried together with his wife, Antoinette L. Frisbie (1896–1994) at Golden Gate National Cemetery in San Bruno, California.

== Decorations ==
Here is the ribbon bar of Brigadier General Julian N. Frisbie:

1st row	Navy Cross			
2nd row	Silver Star	Legion of Merit	Army Commendation Medal	Navy Presidential Unit Citation with two stars
3rd row	Marine Corps Good Conduct Medal	Marine Corps Expeditionary Medal	World War I Victory Medal	Second Nicaraguan Campaign Medal
4th row	China Service Medal	American Defense Service Medal with Fleet Clasp	American Campaign Medal	Asiatic-Pacific Campaign Medal with four 3/16 inch service stars
5th row	World War II Victory Medal	Navy Occupation Service Medal	Nicaraguan Presidential Medal of Merit with Star and Diploma	Order of the Cloud and Banner, 5th Grade

=== Navy Cross citation ===
The President of the United States of America takes pleasure in presenting the Navy Cross to Colonel Julian N. Frisbie (MCSN: 0-313), United States Marine Corps, for extraordinary heroism and distinguished service while serving as commanding officer of the Seventh Marines (Reinforced), FIRST Marine Division, serving with the SIXTH United States Army, during action against enemy Japanese forces at Cape Gloucester, New Britain, from 26 December 1943 to 16 January 1944. After his regiment had made the initial landing and secured the Division beachhead in the vicinity of Borgen Bay, Colonel Frisbie, maintaining continuous pressure on the enemy, advanced the troops of his command steadily until the assigned sector was entirely secured. Although his Command Post was constantly harassed by Japanese small-arms fire, Colonel Frisbie daily traversed the front lines within the dense and treacherous jungle and, by his brilliant fearless leadership, inspired his command to such valiant effort that virtual annihilation of the 141st Japanese Regiment (Reinforced), was accomplished. Colonel Frisbie's gallant devotion to duty throughout this period was in keeping with the highest traditions of the United States Naval Service.

=== Silver Star citation ===
The President of the United States of America takes pleasure in presenting the Silver Star to Lieutenant Colonel Julian N. Frisbie (MCSN: 0-313), United States Marine Corps, for conspicuous gallantry and intrepidity as executive officer of the Seventh Marines, FIRST Marine Division, in action against enemy Japanese forces at Guadalcanal, Solomon Islands, during the period September to December, 1942. When a large Japanese force attacked the defensive lines of a sector under his command in the Lunga Area, Lieutenant Colonel Frisbie, on the front line of his forces, tirelessly worked to replenish dwindling ammunition supplies in the forward area, obtain necessary artillery support, and direct timely reinforcements. By his determined efforts and heroic disregard for his own personal safety, he enabled his men to repulse repeated enemy attacks during the night and contributed to the virtual annihilation of an entire Japanese regiment. His conduct throughout was in keeping with the highest traditions of the United States Naval Service.

== See also ==
- Battle of Guadalcanal

Military offices
Preceded by John H. Griebel	Commanding Officer, 5th Marine Regiment; June 25, 1945 - October 15, 1945	Succeeded by Robert E. Hill
Preceded by Amor L. Sims	Commanding Officer, 7th Marine Regiment; 22 June 1943 – 20 February 1944	Succeeded by Herman H. Hanneken
