= Lawrence F. Snowden =

United States Marine Corps general

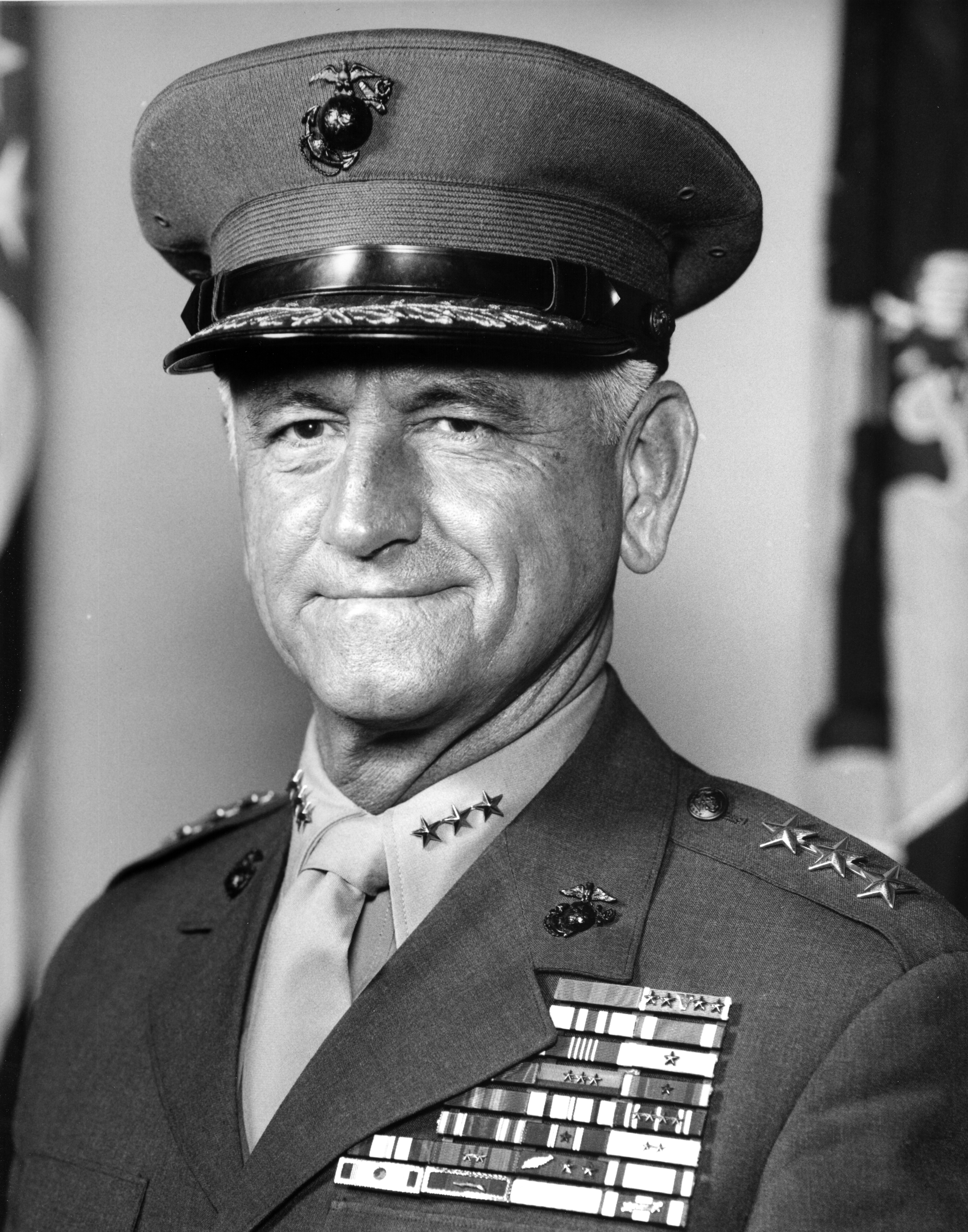
- Snowden as a Lieutenant General in 1978
- Born: Lawrence Fontaine Snoddy, Jr. April 14, 1921; Charlottesville, Virginia, U.S.
- Died: February 18, 2017 (aged 95); Tallahassee, Florida, U.S.
- Military career
- Allegiance: United States of America
- Branch: United States Marine Corps
- Service years: 1942–1979
- Rank: Lieutenant general
- Service number: 0-11636
- Commands: Chief of Staff, HQMC; 7th Marine Regiment; 3rd Battalion, 1st Marines
- Conflicts: World War II: Battle of Kwajalein; Battle of Saipan; Battle of Tinian; Battle of Iwo Jima; Korean War: Battle of the Samichon River; Vietnam War: Operation Golden Fleece
- Awards: Distinguished Service Medal (2); Legion of Merit (5); Commendation Medal (3); Purple Heart (2)

Lawrence Fontaine Snowden (April 14, 1921 – February 18, 2017) was a lieutenant general in the United States Marine Corps. In 1995, he founded the annual Reunion of Honor, a program honoring those who lost their lives on both sides of the Battle of Iwo Jima.

== Early life and education ==
Lawrence F. Snowden was born April 14, 1921, in Charlottesville, Virginia, and graduated from the University of Virginia in 1942 with a Bachelor of Science degree in Commerce. He also earned a master's degree in Personnel Administration from Northwestern University in 1950.

== Career ==
Snowden enlisted in the Marine Corps Reserve in February 1942. He was called to active duty that May, attended Officer Candidates School and was commissioned a second lieutenant on July 18, 1942. He was promoted to first lieutenant in March 1943 and to captain in October 1944.

From February 1944 until March 1945, Snowden was a company commander with the 23rd Marines during the capture of Roi-Namur during the Battle of Kwajalein, the capture of Saipan and the capture of Tinian. During the assault on Iwo Jima, he commanded Company F, 2nd Battalion, 23rd Marine Regiment, 4th Marine Division. During the battle, he was wounded and medically evacuated. In May 1945, he joined the 3rd Marine Division on Guam, serving with the 3rd Marine and 9th Marine Regiments until December 1945.

In February 1946, he attended the Administrative School and was then assigned to Headquarters Marine Corps, where he served on the staff of G-4, Plans and Policies Division. From August 1950 until March 1953, he served as a member of the Testing and Evaluation Unit until March 1953. During this assignment, in January 1951, he was promoted to the rank of major.

Major Snowden was ordered to South Korea in April 1953, assigned to the 7th Marine Regiment, and served there until April 1954. For his service in Korea, he was awarded the Legion of Merit with Combat "V." After returning to the United States, he served as officer in charge, Marine Corps Recruiting Station, New York, from May 1954 until June 1956, during which time, in January 1955, he was promoted to lieutenant colonel. He then served for two years on the staff of the commander in chief. In September 1958, he entered the Senior School at Quantico and, upon graduation, was assigned to Headquarters Marine Corps as an action officer for the Marine Corps participation in Joint Chiefs of Staff matters.

In August 1962, Snowden became the commanding officer, 3rd Battalion, 1st Marines and later commanded Battalion Landing Team 3/1 aboard the USS Iwo Jima for deployment to the Caribbean during the Cuban crisis in October 1962. From May 1963 until June 1964, he served with the 1st Marine Division at Camp Pendleton, California, as deputy G-4, logistics officer and later as assistant chief of staff, G-4. He was promoted to colonel in February 1964. In July 1964, he was assigned as deputy assistant chief of staff, G-4, Fleet Marine Force, Pacific in Hawaii. Ordered to South Vietnam in August 1966, he saw duty as a commanding officer, 7th Marines, and as operations officer, III Marine Amphibious Force. He was awarded gold stars in lieu of a second and third Legion of Merit for his service in Vietnam.

After returning from Vietnam, Colonel Snowden attended the Industrial College of the Armed Forces. Graduating in June 1968, he was then assigned as assistant director of personnel at Headquarters Marine Corps. On August 20, 1968, he was promoted to brigadier general. From September to December 1968, General Snowden attended the Advanced Management Course of the Graduate School of Business at Harvard University prior to being assigned duty in the Office of the chief of staff as director of Management Analysis Group, which in February 1970, was re-designated the Systems Support Group. He served additionally, from March to September 1969, as the Inspector General of the Marine Corps. For his service as the organizer and first director of the Systems Support Group, he was awarded a gold star in lieu of a fourth Legion of Merit. Assigned to Quantico in June 1970, he served for almost two years as director, Development Center, Marine Corps Development and Education Command, earning a gold star in lieu of a fifth Legion of Merit. On April 1, 1972, he was promoted to major general.

In June 1972, Major General Snowden was ordered to Tokyo where he served for three years as chief of staff, United States Forces Japan. For his contributions to Japan's security interests, he was awarded the Second Order of the Sacred Treasure by the Emperor of Japan. He was also awarded the Distinguished Service Medal for his service. He was promoted to lieutenant general on August 6, 1975.

Lieutenant General Snowden assumed the assignment of chief of staff, Headquarters Marine Corps, on May 21, 1977, and served in that capacity until his retirement on May 31, 1979. For his service at HQMC, he was awarded a second Distinguished Service Medal.

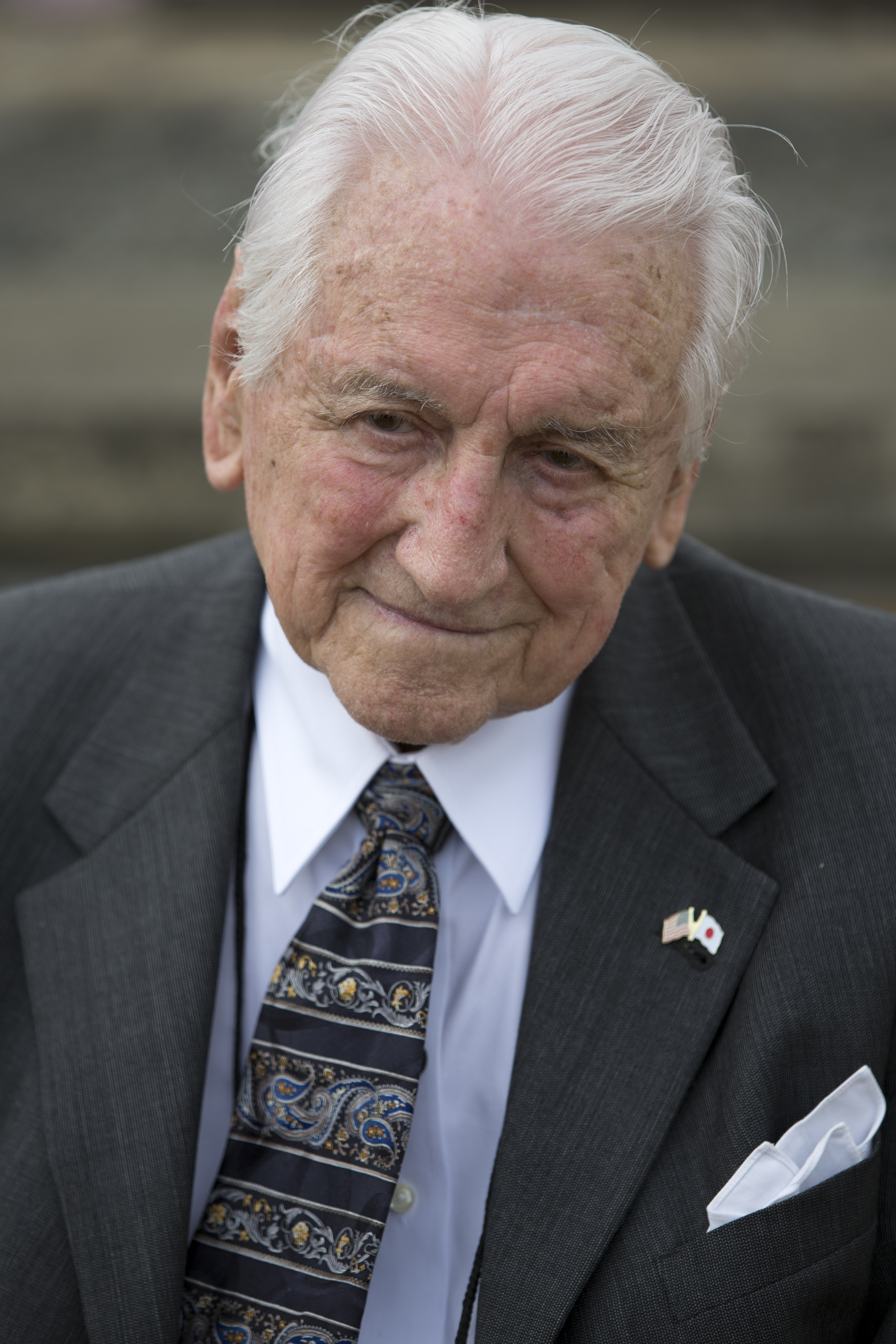
Snowden in 2010

In 1995, on the 50th anniversary of the Battle of Iwo Jima, Snowden founded the annual Reunion of Honor, a program honoring the sacrifices veterans from both sides made during the battle. The ceremony is held annually in both Japan and the United States.

== Honors and awards ==
His military decorations include the Navy Distinguished Service Medal with gold star, Legion of Merit with 'V' for Valor device and four gold stars, Purple Heart with one gold star, Joint Service Commendation Medal, Navy and Marine Corps Commendation Medal, Army Commendation Medal, the Combat Action Ribbon and the Second Order of the Sacred Treasure.

In 1974, Snowden was recognized with the Distinguished Eagle Scout Award by the Boy Scouts of America. Snowden had achieved the rank of Eagle Scout in 1937.

In 2015, he was inducted into the Florida Veterans Hall of Fame.

In March 2016, Snowden was awarded the Department of Defense Medal for Distinguished Public Service and the Navy Distinguished Public Service Award. The awards were presented to him by then Commandant of the Marine Corps Robert Neller.

In 2016, he published his memoir, Snowden's Story: One Marine's Indebtedness to the Corps, recounting important events in his life that developed his character and philosophy.

In January 2017, Snowden was named the Tallahassee Democrat's annual "Person of the Year" for 2016.

In April 2017, his memorial service was attended by United States Secretary of Defense James Mattis, as well as the commandant of the Marine Corps Gen. Robert Neller, who presented the traditional folded flag to Snowden's family members in attendance.

=== Decorations ===
Below is the ribbon bar of Lieutenant General Snowden:

1st Row	Navy Distinguished Service Medal with one 5/16" Gold Star	Legion of Merit with Combat "V" and four 5/16" Gold Stars		Joint Service Commendation Medal
2nd Row	Navy Commendation Medal	Army Commendation Medal	Purple Heart with one 5/16" Gold Star	Combat Action Ribbon
3rd Row	Navy Presidential Unit Citation with three stars	Navy Unit Commendation with one star	Navy Meritorious Unit Commendation	Department of Defense Medal for Distinguished Public Service
4th Row	Navy Meritorious Public Service Award	American Campaign Medal	Asiatic-Pacific Campaign Medal with four 3/16 inch silver service stars	World War II Victory Medal
5th Row	National Defense Service Medal with one star	Korean Service Medal with two 3/16 inch service stars	Armed Forces Expeditionary Medal	Vietnam Service Medal with two 3/16 inch service stars
6th Row	Vietnam Gallantry Cross with Palm and two stars	Vietnam Armed Forces Honor Medal, 1st Class	Japanese Order of the Sacred Treasure, 2nd Class	Republic of Korea Presidential Unit Citation
7th Row	Vietnam Gallantry Cross Unit Citation	United Nations Korea Medal	Vietnam Campaign Medal	Korean War Service Medal
