= 7th Marine Regiment =

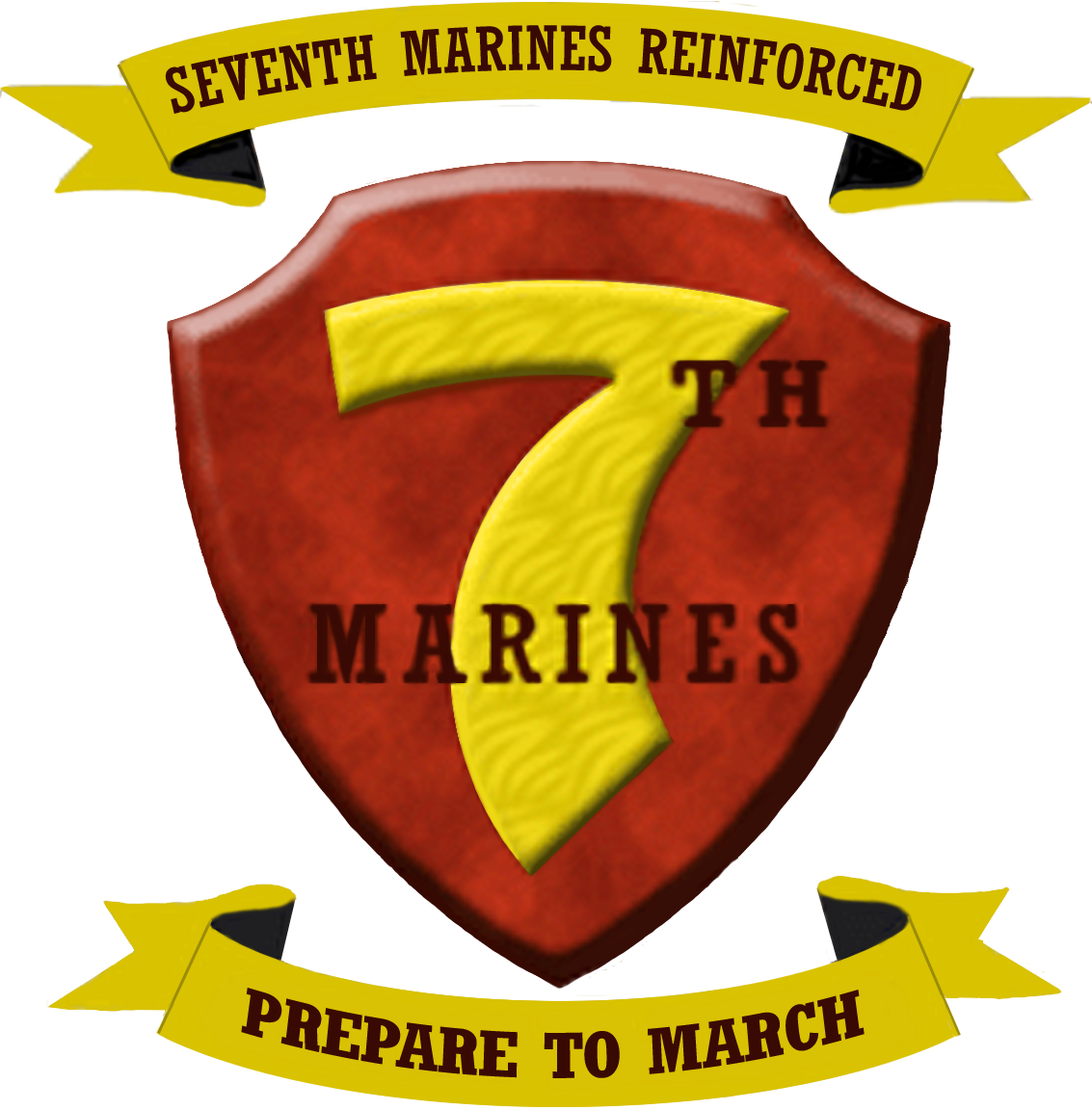
- 7th Marines insignia
- Active: 1917–1919, 1933—34; 1941–1947; 1950–present
- Country: United States
- Branch: United States Marine Corps
- Type: Infantry regiment
- Part of: 1st Marine Division; 1st Marine Expeditionary Force
- Garrison/HQ: MCAGCC Twentynine Palms
- Nicknames: "Magnificent Seventh" "Task Force Ripper" (Persian Gulf War)
- Motto: Prepare to March
- Engagements: World War II; Guadalcanal campaign; Battle of Cape Gloucester; Mariana and Palau Islands campaign; Battle of Peleliu; Volcano and Ryukyu Islands campaign; Battle of Okinawa; Korean War; Battle of Inchon; Second Battle of Seoul; Battle of Chosin Reservoir; Battle of Hwacheon; Battle of the Punchbowl; Battle of Bunker Hill (1952); First Battle of the Hook; Battle for Outpost Vegas; Battle of the Samichon River; Vietnam War; Operation Desert Storm; War on terror; Operation Iraqi Freedom; Operation Enduring Freedom; Operation Inherent Resolve

Commanders
- Current commander: Colonel Andrew Terrell
- Notable commanders: Chesty Puller; Herman H. Hanneken; Amor L. Sims; Julian N. Frisbie; Edward W. Snedeker; Homer Litzenberg; Herman Nickerson Jr. Jack P. Juhan; James Mattis; Lawrence F. Snowden; Oscar F. Peatross

The 7th Marine Regiment is an infantry regiment of the United States Marine Corps based at Marine Corps Air Ground Combat Center Twentynine Palms, California. Nicknamed the "Magnificent Seventh", the regiment falls under the command of the 1st Marine Division and the I Marine Expeditionary Force.

== Mission ==
Conduct mechanized, combined-arms operations and other expeditionary operations in order to support theater engagement plans and contingency operations. The regiment will be prepared to deploy within 48-hours of the receipt of an execute order as either the ground combat element for the 1st Marine Expeditionary Brigade (1st MEB) or as a major subordinate element of the 1st Marine Division. As directed, the regiment will prepare infantry battalions for deployment to the Pacific Command (PACOM AOR) in order to support III Marine Expeditionary Force (III MEF) operations and training

== Organization ==
- 1st Battalion, 7th Marines (1/7)
- 2nd Battalion, 7th Marines (2/7)
- 3rd Battalion, 7th Marines (3/7)
- 3rd Battalion, 4th Marines (3/4) – (assigned to the 7th Marine Regiment for the purpose of facilitating 4th Marines as a "host" regimental headquarters for battalions on unit deployment program assignments to 3rd Marine Division on Okinawa.)

== History ==
=== Early years ===
The 7th Marine Regiment was formed in Philadelphia, Pennsylvania on 14 August 1917. From August 1917 through August 1919, the 7th Marine Regiment served in Cuba. Returning to Philadelphia in August 1919 the regiment was decommissioned on 6 September 1919.

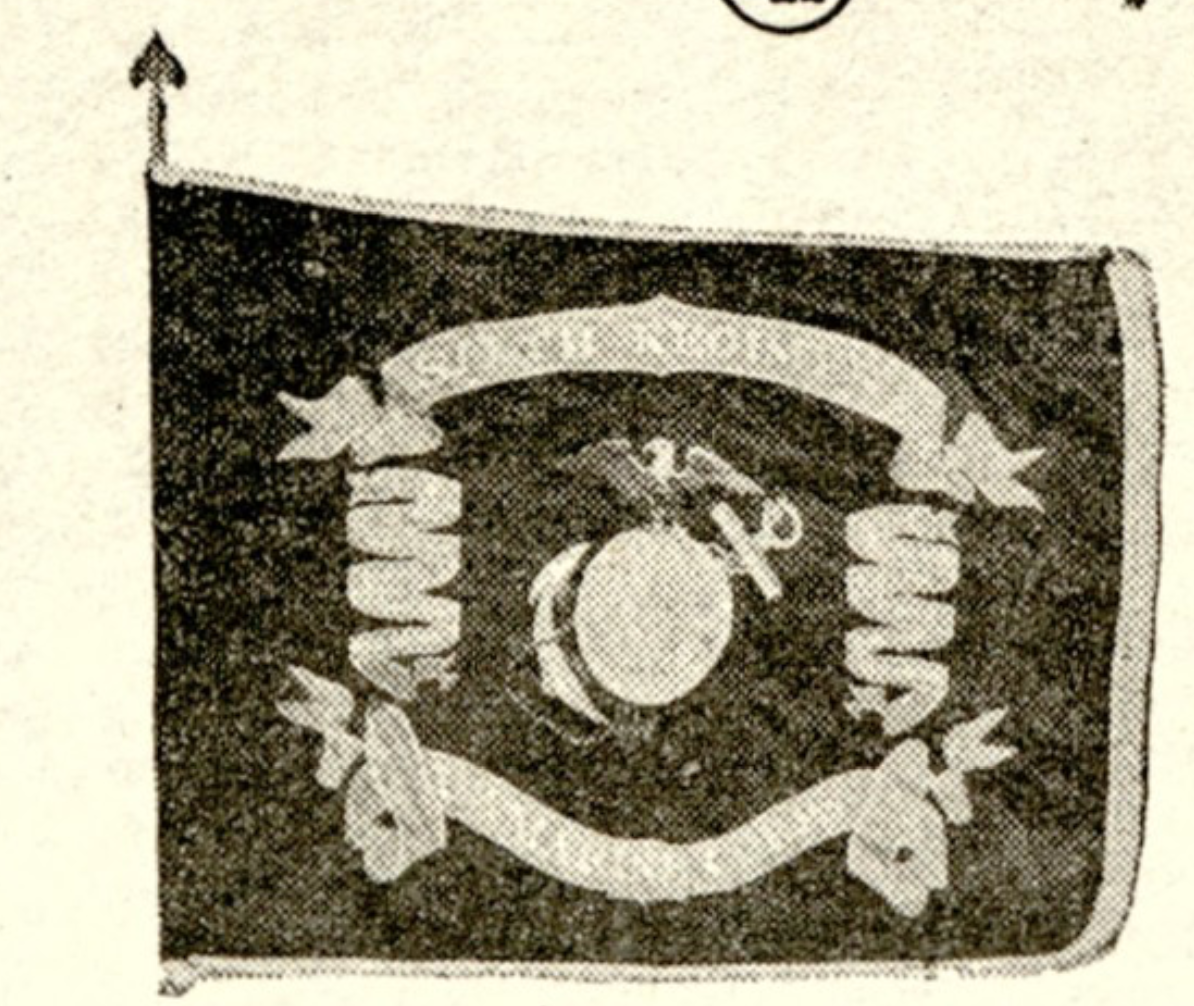
Regimental flag from 1933

The regiment was reactivated on 6 September 1933 at Marine Corps Base Quantico, Virginia with two battalions and was again alerted for service in Cuba but did not deploy. At the end of the crisis, the battalions of the 7th Marines were redesignated and the regiment was once again decommissioned on 17 January 1934.

=== World War II ===
On 1 January 1941, the 7th Marine Regiment was re-activated at Guantanamo Bay, Cuba. The regiment moved to what is today Marine Corps Base Camp Lejeune, North Carolina. In the spring of 1942 the 7th along with 1/11 were detached to form the 3rd Marine Brigade for duty in Samoa. On 18 September 1942 the regiment, now reassigned to the 1st Marine Division, landed in the Solomon Islands on Guadalcanal. For four long months the regiment relentlessly attacked the Japanese defenders and repulsed banzai charges and suicidal attacks. Colonel Amor L. Sims led the regiment during the whole Guadalcanal campaign and his men annihilated over 6,000 Japanese in 42 separate engagements.

Arriving in Australia in January 1943, the vast majority of the regiment suffered from malaria, wounds or fatigue.

Again and again the regiment was called upon to storm the Japanese-held islands in the Pacific. The Seventh Marine Regiment fought in such places as Eastern New Guinea, New Britain, "Bloody Peleliu" and the island fortress of Okinawa. 7th Marines saw intense fighting on the island of Okinawa under Colonel Edward W. Snedeker where they sustained 700 Marines killed or wounded in the fighting to take Dakeshi Ridge and another 500 killed or wounded in the fighting near Wana Ridge.

After the surrender of Japan, 7th Marines took part in Operation Beleaguer in China from 30 September 1945 through 5 January 1947. The mission was to repatriate the Japanese military that remained in China after V-J day. They returned to MCB Camp Pendleton, California in January 1947 and were reassigned to the 1st Marine Division. The regiment was deactivated on 6 March 1947 as part of the Marine Corps' draw down of forces after the war. 7th Marines however was quickly reactivated on 1 October 1947 but only as a shell of its former self as it consisted of only four companies. Company "C" deployed to China from 2 May through 23 June 1949 to safeguard the withdrawal of Americans and was the last element of Fleet Marine Force to depart China.

=== Korean War ===
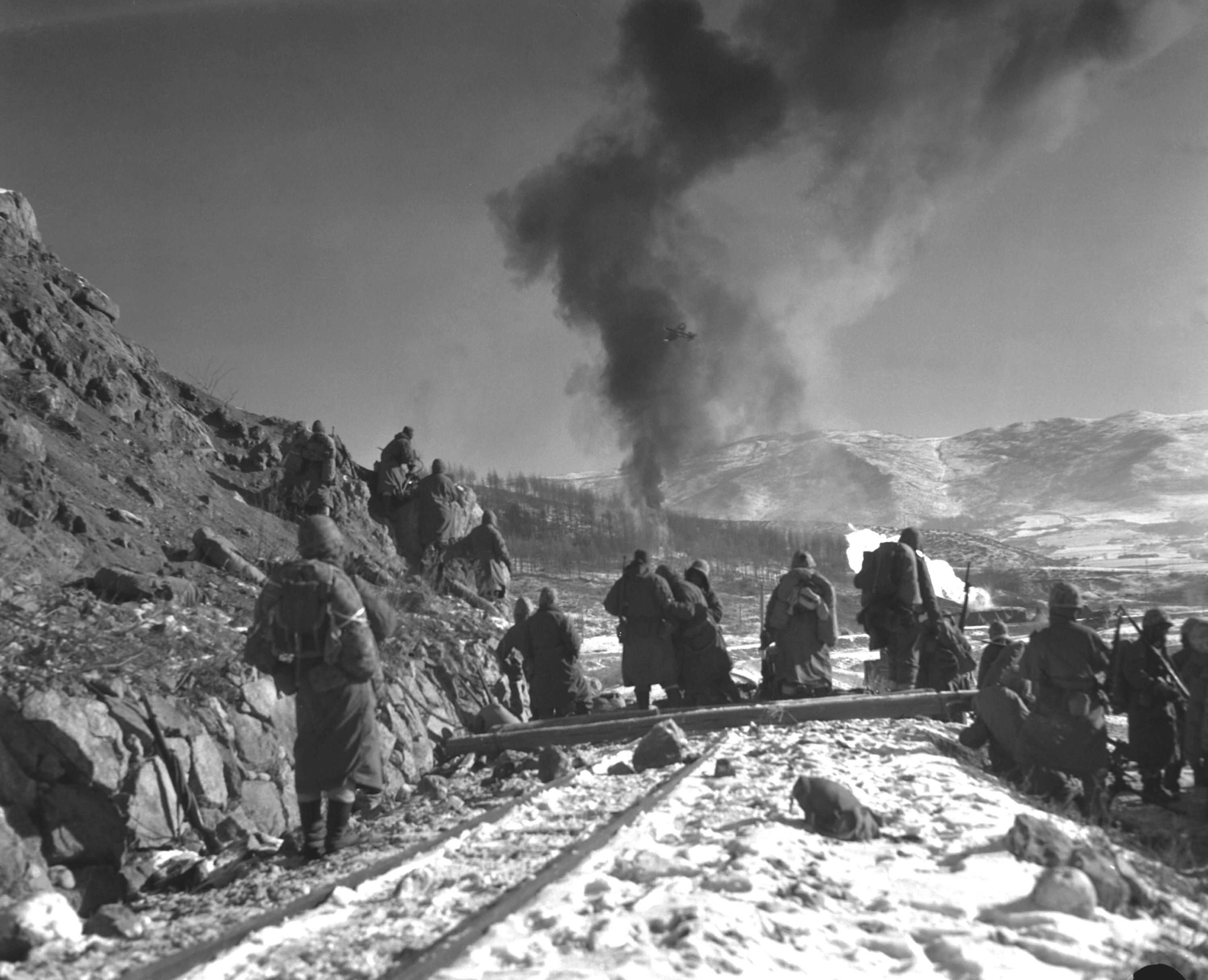
Marines watch F4U Corsairs drop napalm as I Company, 3rd Battalion, 7th Marines move in to attack Chinese positions in North Korea.

==== Seoul ====
On 17 August 1950, after the outbreak of the Korean War, the 7th Marines was reactivated as part of the 1st Marine Division. On 21 September 1950 the regiment landed at Inchon and took part in the recapture of Seoul. On 7 October 1950, after 22 days of fighting, 7th Marines, situated north of the Han River was relieved by units of the US & ROK Armies and retired to a staging area near Incheon.

==== Chosin Reservoir ====
After reembarking on amphibious shipping and sailing to the east coast of the peninsula, the regiment came ashore at Wonsan on 26 Oct. Based on X Corps tasking, 1st Marine Division ordered 7th Marines to advanced north along the Hamhung-Chosin Reservoir road to the northern tip of the reservoir. In addition, be prepared to advance further north, right up to the northern border of Korea. From 29–31 Oct 7th Marines was transported north via rail and truck movements pto Hamhung where the regiment prepared to spearhead the division's advance north. Before the regiment began to move north on 1 Nov, it had already begun to receive reports from adjacent ROK AND US Army units that Chinese forces were operating in the area. Because the nearest US Army unit to the west was nearly 60 miles away, the regiments left flank was exposed during its entire movement north. The regiment's first major encounter with Chinese Forces occurred in the vicinity of Sudong on 2–4 Nov when two Chinese battalions attempted to encircle its position. Although the MSR was cut for a period of time, the regiment defeated the enemy forces in area with more than 100 Marines wounded, the 7th continued north.

The regiment occupied Koto-ri on 10 Nov. After two days regrouping, began the advance further north, having been ordered to seize Hagaru-ri and be prepared for follow on operations to seize Yudam-ni. The first elements of 7th Marines reached Yudam-ni, on the western side of the Chosin Reservoir on 25 Nov.

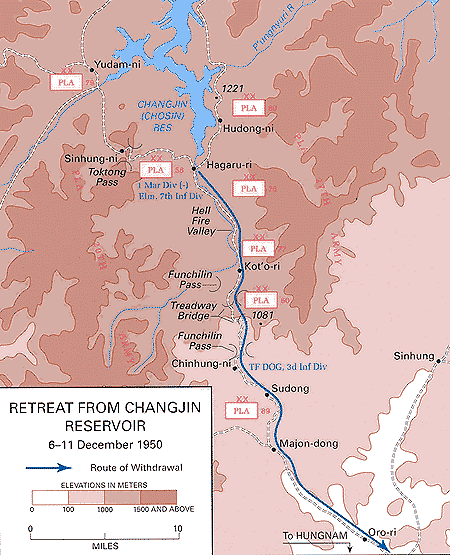
Map of the Retreat from the Changjin (Chosin) Reservoir

On the night of 27 Nov, the PVA's 79th and 89th Divisions surrounded the 5th, 7th and 11th Marine Regiments positions at Yudam-ni. 5th and 7th Marines were able to hold on while inflicting heavy casualties on the Chinese forces. Acting on the orders of the Corps Commander, Major General Edward Almond and 1st Marine Division Command General Oliver P. Smith, the commanders of the 5th and 7th Marines Lieutenant Colonel Raymond L. Murray and Colonel Homer L. Litzenberg, respectively, issued a joint order on 30 Nov to their Marines to break out from Yudam-ni, and to reach Hagaru-ri. 5th & 7th Marines moving south on 1 December and reaching the perimeter at Hagaru-ri on 3 December.

After a short rest, the breakout began on 6 Dec, with the 7th Marines as the vanguard of the retreating column, while the 5th Marines covered the rear. 7th Marines pushed aside the PVA 76th Division south of Hagaru-ri, and continued along the MSR. The regiment opened the road between Hagaru-ri and Koto-ri by capturing the high ground surrounding the road. But as soon as the Marines pulled out, the 77th Division returned to the peaks and attacked the column. The entire regiment was inside the perimeter of Koto-ri by 1700 on 7 Dec. 7th Marines, with remnants of Regimental Combat Team 31 attached, continued to attack south seizing the approaches to the Funchilin Pass on 8–9 Dec. PVA forces had destroyed the bridge at the Funchilin Pass delaying the retreat until Marine and Army engineers constructed a temporary bridge. Upon its completion on 9 Dec, 7th Marines continued south with the rest of the 1st Marine Division arriving at Hungnam by 11 Dec.

Between 11 and 12 Dec, 7th Marines embarked upon amphibious shipping finally sailing from Hungnam Harbor on 15 Dec. Over the next few days, 7th Marines along with the rest of the 1st Marine Division disembarked at Pusan and established their command post 40 miles west of there near Masan.

==== Remainder of the Korean War ====
By mid-January, elements of the regiment had been deployed north into the vicinity of Pohang to interdict North Korean infiltrators in the area. After a significant battle of 25 January the area was secured. In mid-February, 7th Marines and he rest of the 1st Marine Division were deployed north to Chungju and took part in Operation Killer and served as the Division reserve for Operation Ripper which eventually led to the recapture of Seoul in March. The regiment remained heavily engaged in the UN offensives in the vicinity of Seoul from March through June 1951 when UN forces had seized favorable position in the vicinity of the 38th parallel.

On 27 August, 7th Marines and a regiment from the Republic of Korea Marine Corps relieved US Army and Korean units near an area known as the "Punchbowl." Three days later the regiment attacked north as part of the Battle of the Punchbowl. The regiment remained decisively engaged in heavy combat until being relieved on 12 September 1951. For the remainder of the year and until March 1952 the regiment found itself dug and defending heavily fortified positions in fighting similar to the trench warfare of World War I.

Twenty Marines from the regiment were awarded the Medal of Honor for their action during the Korean War.The 7th Marine Regiment finally departed South Korea on 10 March 1955, sailing from Inchon and arriving at MCB Camp Pendleton two weeks later.

=== Vietnam War ===
In fall of 1962, substantial parts of the regiment embarked for the Caribbean and possible action in Cuba, aimed at forcing the removal of Soviet nuclear missiles pointed at the United States. As the Cuban Missile Crisis subsided, The Seventh Marines returned to Camp Pendleton, California.

In 1965, the regiment was deployed to South Vietnam. While in service in Vietnam the 7th Marine regiment participated in the following military operations: Operation Starlite, Operation Piranha, Operation Harvest Moon, Operation Mallard, operations Texas and Indiana, Operation Golden Fleece 7-1, Operation Rio Blanco, Operation Shark, Operation Boone, Operation Duval, Operation Desoto, Operation Foster, Tet Offensive, Operation Allen Brook, Operation Mameluke Thrust, Operation Daring Endeavor, Operation Linn River, Operation Meade River, Operation Oklahoma Hills, Operation Taylor Common, Phase I of Operation Pipestone Canyon, the defense of Que Son, Operation Pickens Forest and Operation Imperial Lake. The last elements of 7th Marines departed South Vietnam on 13 October 1970.

=== Gulf War ===
In August 1990, shortly after shifting the home of the regimental colors from Camp Pendelton to the Marine Corps Air Ground Combat Center Twentynine Palms, California, the Marines and sailors of the regiment deployed to Saudi Arabia. They were part of the attack into Kuwait and eventual victory. In August 1991, as a result of the unique organizational changes that occurred in Seventh Marines, and with the addition of 3rd LAR Battalion, 3rd Tank Battalion and Delta Company, 3rd Assault Amphibian Battalion, Seventh Marine Regiment became Regimental Combat Team Seven (RCT-7).

In December 1992, RCT-7 deployed on Operation Restore Hope to relieve famine and return order to Somalia, remaining there for five months.

On 13 August 1993, on the eve of the regiment's 76th anniversary, the regiment formally marked the return to its original designation by changing its name from Regimental Combat Team 7 to 7th Marines (Reinforced).

In August 1996, organizational changes once again designated 3rd LAR Battalion (Formerly LAI Bn) and 1st Tank Battalion as separate battalions in direct support of the 7th Marine's MPF Mission. Also in direct support is Delta Company 3rd AA Battalion who returned to 3rd Assault Amphibian Battalion.

=== Global war on terrorism ===
In January 2003, the 7th Marines deployed to Kuwait as part of Operation Iraqi Freedom. On 21 March, the regiment crossed the line of departure into Iraq as it moved to seize and cut off Iraqi units around Basrah. During the course of the next few weeks, the regiment continued the offensive to capture Baghdad and collapse the regime of Saddam Hussein. During much of the attack north, the regiment led the 1st Marine Division in the deepest attack in Marine Corps history. The regiment again deployed to Iraq in February 2004 where they were based at Al Asad Airbase and were responsible for security and stabilization operations in the western desert regions of Al Anbar Province. The regiment's third Iraq deployment came in 2006 where they were again operating throughout Al Anbar and based at Al Asad.

1st Battalion, 3rd Marines and other supporting units from Hawaii were attached to the 7th Marine Regiment in 2004 and 2005 during Operation Phantom Fury to assist with the invasion of Fallujah.

The regiment deployed in support of Operation Enduring Freedom as part of the International Security Assistance Force (ISAF) in Helmand Province, Afghanistan from September 2009 – September 2010. They were based at Camp Dwyer.

The regiment returned to Afghanistan in September 2012 in support of Operation Enduring Freedom and remained there until September 2013. They were based at Camp Leatherneck.

=== Special Purpose Marine Air-Ground Task Force, Crisis Response, Central Command, April 2015 – present ===
In April 2015, 7th Marines took command of the Special Purpose Marine Air-Ground Task Force from 5th Marines.

Since late-2014, the infantry battalions of 7th Marines (1/7, 2/7, 3/7, & 3/4 after re-activation) have served as the Ground Combat Element for the SP-MAGTF and served in that capacity for the remainder of the decade.

== Notable former members ==
=== Medal of honor recipients ===
- "Manila John" Basilone, Gunnery Sergeant, WWII
- William E. Barber, Korean War
- Wayne Caron, HM3 attached to Co. K, 3rd battalion 7th Marines, Vietnam
- Raymond Davis, Korean War
- Jason Dunham, Iraq War
- Herman H. Hanneken, commanding officer, Guadalcanal campaign, WWII
- Mitchell Paige, WWII
- Jay Vargas, Vietnam War
- Roy M. Wheat, Lance Cpl., Co. K, 3rd battalion 7th Marines, Vietnam
- Arthur J. Jackson, Private First Class, 3rd Battalion 7th Marines, Battle of Peleliu, WWII
- John D. New, Private First Class, 2nd Battalion 7th Marines, Battle of Peleliu, WWII
- Wesley Phelps, Private First Class, 3rd Battalion 7th Marines, Battle of Peleliu, WWII
- Charles H. Roan, Private First Class, 2nd Battalion 7th Marines, Battle of Peleliu, WWII

=== Other notables ===
- Henry W. Buse Jr., Silver Star, commanding officer, 3rd Battalion, Cape Gloucester operation, WWII
- Odell M. Conoley, Navy Cross, commanding officer, 2nd Battalion, Cape Gloucester operation, WWII
- Julian N. Frisbie, Navy Cross, commanding officer, Cape Gloucester operation, WWII
- Jack P. Juhan, commanding officer, 1953, Korean War.
- Homer Litzenberg, Navy Cross, commanding officer, Battle of Chosin Reservoir, Korean War.
- James Mattis, United States Secretary of Defense, commanding general, 2004–2007, Iraq War
- Herman Nickerson Jr., Army Distinguished Service Cross, commanding officer, Battle of the Punchbowl, Korean War
- Oscar F. Peatross, Navy Cross, commanding officer, 1964–1966, Vietnam War
- Lewis "Chesty" Puller, five Navy Crosses
- Amor L. Sims, two Silver Stars, commanding officer, Guadalcanal campaign, WWII
- Edward W. Snedeker, Navy Cross, commanding officer, Battle of Okinawa, WWII
- Lawrence F. Snowden, commanding officer, 1966–1967, Vietnam War
- Todd Burnett, NCOIC of Truck Company detachment, Gulf War
- Master Gunnery Sergeant Charles Baker, Regimental Operations Chief "RIPPER-3C" (2017–2018)
- Master Gunnery Sergeant Jeremiah "Jay-Jay" Johnson, most collective time spent within 7th Marine Regiment (2nd BN 7th MAR 2001-2004, 1st BN 7th MAR 2006-2010 OIF, RCT-7 2012-2013 OEF, 7th MAR REG HQ 2018-2019 SW Border Mission, 1st BN 7th MAR 2019-2020 OIR, 1st BN 7th MAR 2022-2023, 7th MAR REG HQ "RIPPER-3C" 2023-2025).

== Unit awards ==
A unit citation or commendation is an award bestowed upon an organization for the action cited. Members of the unit who participated in said actions are allowed to wear on their uniforms the awarded unit citation. The unit is authorized to fly the appropriate streamer on its organizational flag. The 7th Marine Regiment has been presented with the following awards:

Streamer	Award
	Presidential Unit Citation Streamer with one Silver and four Bronze Stars
	Joint Meritorious Unit Award Streamer
	Navy Unit Commendation Streamer with three Bronze Stars
	Meritorious Unit Commendation Streamer with one Bronze Star
	World War I Victory Streamer with "West Indies" Clasp
	American Defense Service Streamer with one Bronze Star
	Asiatic-Pacific Campaign Streamer with one Silver Star
	World War II Victory Streamer
	Navy Occupation Service Streamer with "ASIA"
	China Service Streamer
	National Defense Service Streamer with three Bronze Stars
	Korean Service Streamer with one Silver and four Bronze Stars
	Armed Forces Expeditionary Streamer with one Bronze Star
	Vietnam Service Streamer with two Silver and three Bronze Stars
	Southwest Asia Service Streamer with two Bronze Stars
	Afghanistan Campaign Streamer with one Bronze Star
	Iraq Campaign Streamer with three Bronze Stars
	Global War on Terrorism Expeditionary Streamer
	Global War on Terrorism Service Streamer
	Korea Presidential Unit Citation Streamer
	Vietnam Gallantry Cross with Palm Streamer
	Vietnam Meritorious Unit Citation Civil Actions Streamer

== See also ==
- History of the United States Marine Corps
- List of United States Marine Corps regiments
- Organization of the United States Marine Corps
