= Amor L. Sims =

United States brigadier general

Amor LeRoy Sims
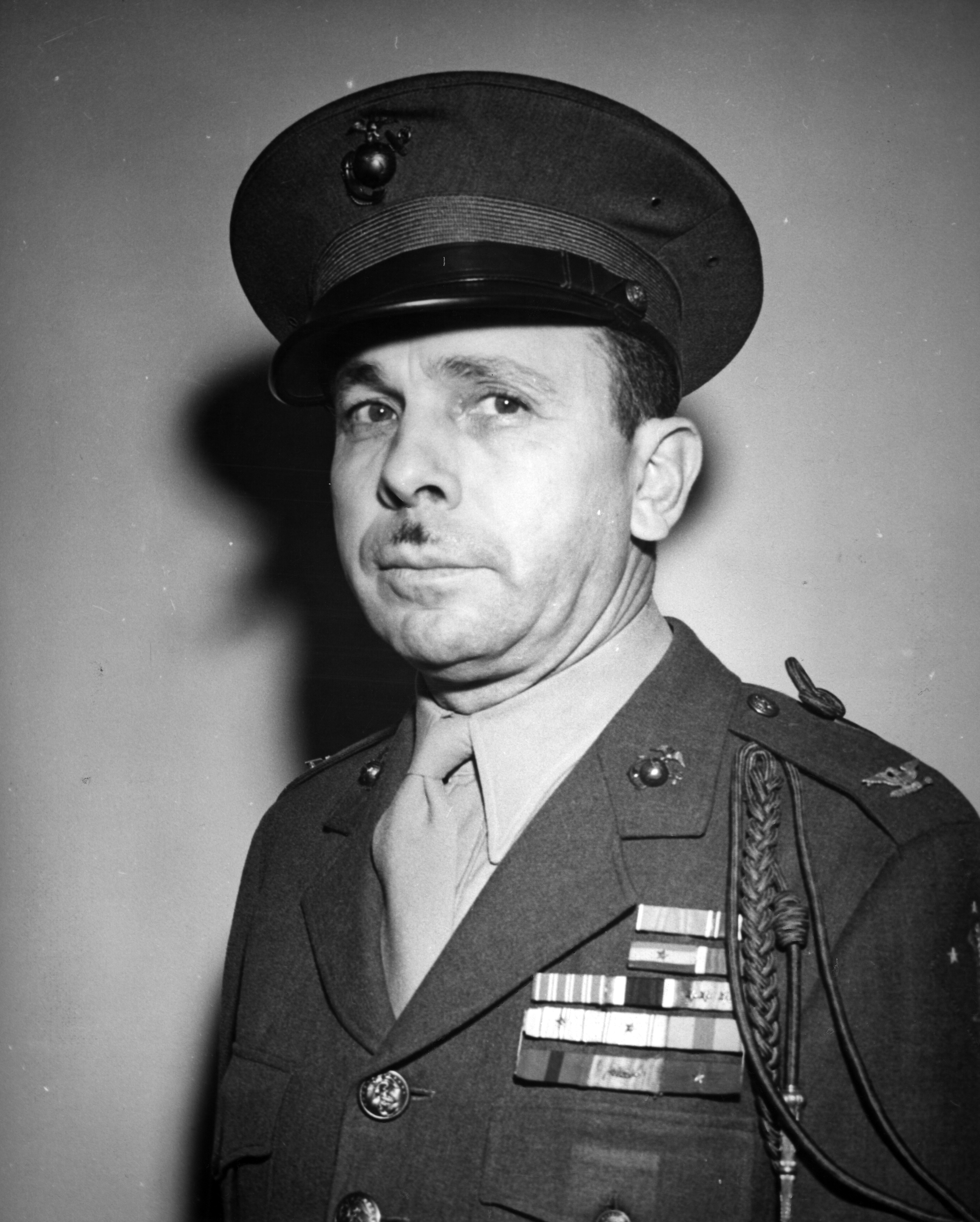
- Colonel Amor LeRoy Sims, USMC
- Born: May 29, 1896; Groveport, Ohio, US
- Died: November 30, 1978 (aged 82); Norfolk, Virginia, US
- Burial place: Arlington National Cemetery
- Military career
- Allegiance: United States of America
- Branch: United States Marine Corps
- Service years: 1917–1949
- Rank: Brigadier general
- Nickname: "The Iron Duke"
- Service number: 0-899
- Commands: 7th Marine Regiment; CoS of 1st Marine Division; 1st Battalion, 7th Marines
- Conflicts: World War I: Battle of Belleau Wood; Battle of Soissons; Battle of Blanc Mont Ridge; Meuse-Argonne Offensive; Banana Wars: Dominican Campaign; Nicaraguan Campaign; World War II: Guadalcanal Campaign; Actions along the Matanikau; Battle for Henderson Field; New Britain campaign; Battle of Cape Gloucester
- Awards: Silver Star (2); Legion of Merit (2); Purple Heart
- Other work: Chief of Police, Norfolk, Virginia

Amor LeRoy Sims (May 29, 1896 – November 30, 1978) was a highly decorated officer of the United States Marine Corps with the rank of brigadier general, who is most noted as commanding officer of 7th Marine Regiment during World War II. He also served as chief of the Norfolk Police Department from 1949 to 1952.

== Early years ==
Sims was born on May 29, 1896, in Groveport, Ohio, as the son of carpenter Harry Harrison Sims (1871–1948) and his wife Rose Catherine Saylor Sims (1870–1938). Following high school, Amor entered Ohio State University, but left after two years due to the United States' entry into World War I in April 1917. He enlisted in the United States Marine Corps as private and was then assigned to the newly activated 17th Company, 1st Battalion, 5th Marine Regiment at Philadelphia Navy Yard and embarked for France. During his service with the 17th Company, Sims served with many distinguished officers, who reached general officer rank in their later careers, including Robert Blake, LeRoy P. Hunt, Leonard E. Rea or Roswell Winans.

He arrived to Saint-Nazaire in early July of that year and spent the rest of the year with training with the French elite mountain infantry, Chasseurs Alpins, near Gondecourt in northern France. During that period, Sims rose to the rank of sergeant and earned the Marine Corps Good Conduct Medal.

In mid-March 1918, Sims and his battalion were ordered to the frontline trenches in the Toulon Sector, just southeast of Verdun. It was a relatively quiet period and they spent their time repairing of existing trenches and dugouts, digging new trenches, and stringing and repairing barbed wire entanglements. The 5th Marines departed Toulon Sector in mid-May 1918 and after a brief period of training at the Gizors training area, they were finally ordered to the front north of Marne River near Château-Thierry on June 2.

Sims participated in the famous Battle of Belleau Wood and distinguished himself while under enemy fire on June 6, 1918, during the Attack on Hill 142. One of fellow marine, Sgt. Paul J. Robinett, had been badly wounded in the chest and lay in an exposed position swept by machine gun, rifle and artillery fire. Sims and two fellow marines volunteered for the rescue mission and moved him to a shelter. For this act of valor, Sims was decorated with the Silver Star.

He later took part in the Battle of Soissons in July 1918, but was badly wounded by enemy fire and spent two months in field hospital. For his experiences and skills, Sims received a battlefield promotion and was promoted to the rank of second lieutenant in the Marine Corps Reserve. He later joined 66th Company as platoon leader and took part in the Battle of Blanc Mont Ridge in October 1918 and Meuse-Argonne Offensive in November of that year. Sims was also decorated with the Croix de Guerre 1914–1918 with Palm and Fourragère by the Government of France.

== Interwar period ==
Following the Armistice, Sims was attached to the headquarters of 4th Marine Brigade under Brigadier General Wendell C. Neville and participated in the March to the Rhineland and its occupation. He was stationed in Coblenz and received temporary promotion to first lieutenant in August 1919. Upon his return stateside soon after, Sims was reverted to the rank of second lieutenant and integrated into the regular Marine Corps.

He subsequently sailed with 2nd Provisional Marine Brigade for his first expeditionary duty to Santo Domingo and participated in the maintaining of order during the presidential elections. Sims was promoted to the permanent rank of first lieutenant in March 1921 and returned to the United States in February 1922 for duty at Marine Barracks Parris Island, South Carolina.

While there, he commanded the Naval Prison Detachment until mid-1925 and then sailed for Guantánamo Bay, Cuba for duty as post quartermaster, Marine Barracks, Guantanamo. Sims later served as Post Executive officer with that command and departed for United States in August 1927 in order to attend the Company Officer's Course at Marine Corps Schools, Quantico. Following the graduation, he was placed in command of the Marine detachment at Receiving Station, Philadelphia Navy Yard and also act as assistant brig warden.

In February 1929, Sims was attached to the 50th Company, 2nd Battalion, 11th Marines and sailed for expeditionary duty to Nicaragua. He was detached to the Guardia Nacional in August of that year and served as an instructor with Guardia in the Department of Rivas. Sims was promoted to captain in October 1930 and appointed commander, 9th Company in Bluefields, where he served until July 1931, when he was ordered back to the United States. For his service in Nicaragua, Sims was decorated with Nicaraguan Presidential Medal of Merit with Diploma.

He then rejoined his former post at Philadelphia and remained in that capacity until June 1934, when he was transferred to Marine Corps Base Quantico as post athletic and amusement officer. Sims was sent as an instructor to the Basic School at Philadelphia Navy Yard in June 1935 and participated in the training of newly commissioned officers until May 1938. While in this capacity, he was promoted to major in summer 1936.

Sims then served as Division Marine Officer, Battleship Division 1 under Rear Admiral Russell Willson at Pearl Harbor, Hawaii first aboard the battleship USS Maryland and the USS Arizona. He was transferred to Marine Barracks Parris Island in July 1940 and served as commanding officer of Post Troops until he was temporarily attached to the 5th Marines, 1st Marine Brigade at Guantanamo Bay during the Fleet Exercise.

== World War II ==
While at Guantanamo, Sims was appointed executive officer of the newly activated 7th Marine Regiment in January 1941 and subsequently assumed command of 1st Battalion of his regiment. He participated in landing exercises at Guantanamo and at Culebra, Puerto Rico, until early spring when the regiment was ordered to the United States.

Sims was promoted to lieutenant colonel in April 1941 and continued with the training of his battalion at Parris Island, South Carolina until October of that year, when he was reappointed as regimental executive officer. Following the Japanese attack on Pearl Harbor on December 7, 1941, the regiment went on immediate alert for a possible overseas deployment, which took place in April–May 1942.

=== Guadalcanal ===
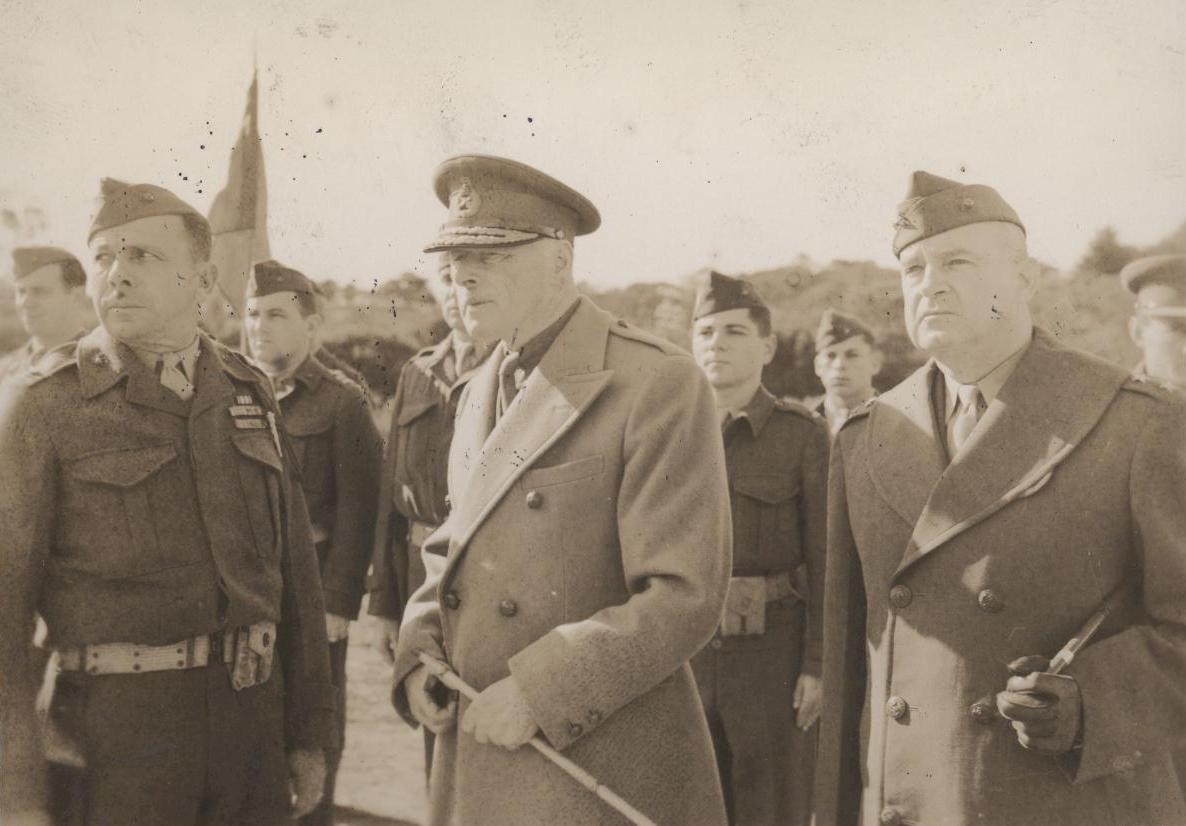
Sims (left), unidentified Australian general and Major General Alexander A. Vandegrift during the 7th Marines Review in Melbourne, Australia

The 7th Marines were stationed in Apia, Samoa as the part of newly created 3rd Marine Brigade under Brigadier General Charles D. Barrett and participated in the intensive jungle training until the late August 1942. The regiment then sailed for Guadalcanal, where it was attached to the 1st Marine Division under Major General Alexander A. Vandegrift. Sims went ashore on September 18, 1942, and replaced regimental commander, Colonel James W. Webb, who was relieved by Vandegrift two days later. Sims was promoted to the temporary rank of colonel for his new assignment.

Sims led the regiment during the Actions along the Matanikau during September–October 1942 and then during the Battle for Henderson Field at the end of October. In mid-November 1942, the 1st and 2d Battalions of his regiment were involved in a number of sharp encounters with enemy units around Koli Point, which is about 5 miles east of Lunga Point. Although the personnel of his command were physically exhausted from previous hard fighting, Sims led his regiment into action against a large force of recently landed enemy troops on the north coast of Guadalcanal. Engaging the Japanese in a grueling series of hand-to-hand combats extending through a period of ten days, he succeeded with his men in driving them back across the Malimbiu and Metapons Rivers and eventually annihilating them in the vicinity of Tetere Village. Sims was subsequently decorated with his second Silver Star for leadership of his regiment during the annihilation of troops at Tetere.

The 7th Marine Regiment was subsequently pulled back to the Lunga Point defensive area, where they carried out the routine patrols for the next several weeks to eliminate those Japanese soldiers who still remained behind in the areas seized by the Americans. During the whole Guadalcanal Campaign, "The Iron Duke" Sims, as his men called him, and his regiment annihilated over 6,000 Japanese in 42 separate engagements. Sims later recalled: "I would stack this regiment against any other group of fighting men in the world, for shooting, fighting, accuracy of fire, knowledge of weapons, and the will to fight. Give me a week and I would stack them against any outfit on the parade ground."

The Relief on the 7th Marines took place in January 1943 and the entire regiment sailed from Guadalcanal for Australia. A week later, Sims and his regiment embarked at Port Phillip off Melbourne. They were subsequently sent to the camp at Mount Martha for rest and refit. Sims also received the Legion of Merit with Combat "V" for his service on Guadalcanal.

=== New Britain ===
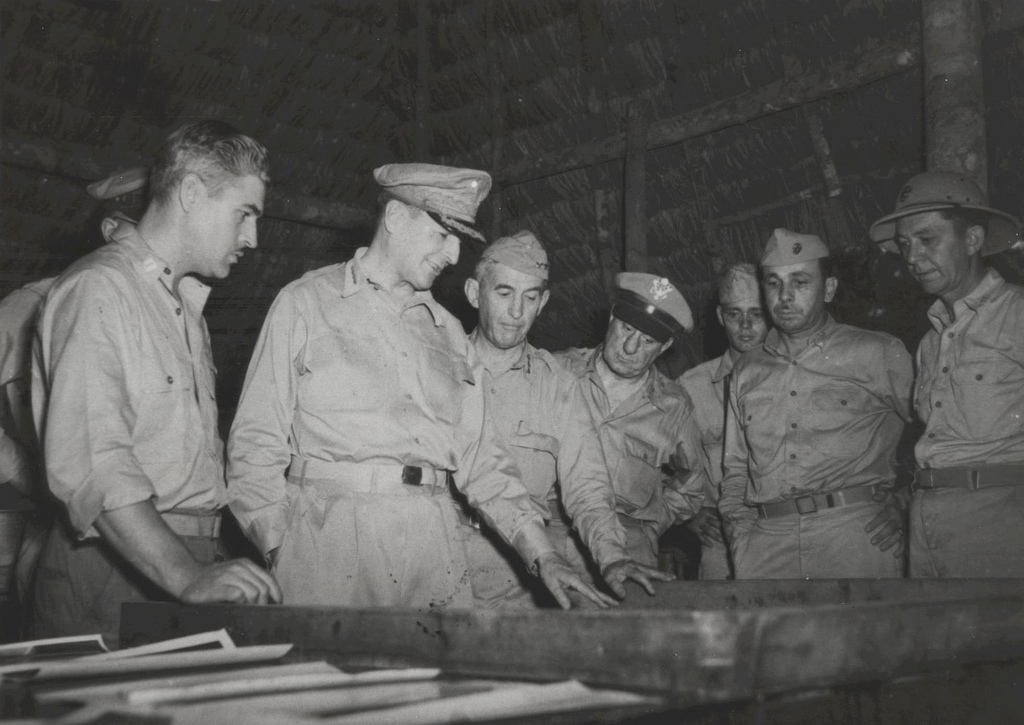
Sims (second from right) looks on General Douglas MacArthur studying a map of Cape Gloucester.

Sims held the command of the regiment until the end of June 1943 and then succeeded Colonel Gerald C. Thomas as Chief of staff of 1st Marine Division. While in this capacity, he served under Major General William H. Rupertus and participated in the planning of Cape Gloucester Operation.

The Operation was launched on December 26, 1943, and lasted until January 16, 1944, and during the course of the battle the division had 310 killed and 1,083 wounded. Sims served in that capacity until the beginning of February 1944, when he was succeeded by Colonel Oliver P. Smith. For his service at New Britain, Sims was decorated with second Legion of Merit.

He was subsequently ordered back to the United States and ordered to the Army and Navy Staff College in Washington, D.C., for instruction. Sims graduated in March 1945 and sailed back to the Pacific area for duty as commanding officer of the 1st Field Service Group, Service Command, Fleet Marine Force, Pacific under Major General Earl C. Long. In this capacity, Sims was co-responsible for the supply, salvage, evacuation, construction, personnel management, quartering and sanitation needs of all FMFPac units and others marine units in its area.

== Postwar career ==
Following the War, Sims travelled to both China and Japan setting up supply procedures for the 6th and 2nd Marine Divisions. He remained in that capacity until August 1946, when he was appointed chief of staff, Service Command. He served in this capacity on Hawaii until August 1948, when he was ordered back to the United States.

Sims he was subsequently appointed commanding officer, Marine Barracks at Naval Station Norfolk with additional duty as District Marine Officer, 5th Naval District and held this commands until his retirement on June 30, 1949, after 32 years of active service. He was then advanced to the rank of brigadier general on the retired list for having been specially commended in combat.

Upon his retirement from the Marine Corps, Sims settled in Norfolk, Virginia, but his retirement did not last long. He was offered appointment of the chief of the Norfolk Police Department, which he accepted. Norfolk city manager C.A. Harrell hired him, because he felt that discipline among police officers was very poor and a retired Marine Corps general could put it right. Norfolk Police Department also had a troubles with many officers, who were charged with conspiracy in gambling and prostitution operations.

Sims was succeeded as chief of police by Norfolk Police Department veteran and Police Medal of Honour recipient Edgar Leroy Cason in 1952 and lived in Norfolk until his death on November 30, 1978. He is buried at Arlington National Cemetery, Virginia, together with his wife Martha Farmer Sims (1892–1979). The couple had together one son, John Boland Sims (1923–2015), who also served with the Marine Corps and retired as colonel.

== Decorations ==
Here is the ribbon bar of Brigadier General Amor LeRoy Sims:

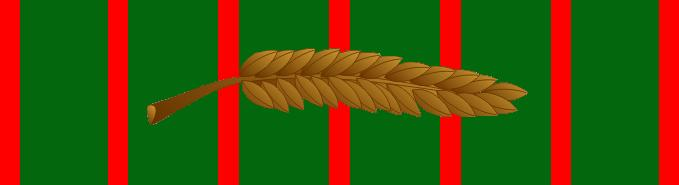

| 1st row | Silver Star with one 5/16" Gold Star | | Legion of Merit with Combat "V" and one 5/16" Gold Star | Purple Heart |
| 2nd row | Navy Presidential Unit Citation with one star | Marine Corps Good Conduct Medal | Marine Corps Expeditionary Medal | World War I Victory Medal with four battle clasps |
| 3rd row | Army of Occupation of Germany Medal | Second Nicaraguan Campaign Medal | American Defense Service Medal with Fleet Clasp | Asiatic-Pacific Campaign Medal with three 3/16 inch service stars |
| 4th row | American Campaign Medal | World War II Victory Medal | French Croix de Guerre 1914–1918 with Palm | Nicaraguan Presidential Medal of Merit with Star and Diploma |

== See also ==
- Guadalcanal Campaign

Military offices
| Preceded by James W. Webb | Commanding Officer of the 7th Marine Regiment; 20 September 1942 – 21 June 1943 | Succeeded by Julian N. Frisbie |
