= Herman H. Hanneken =

United States Marine Corps general and Medal of Honor recipient

Herman Henry Hanneken
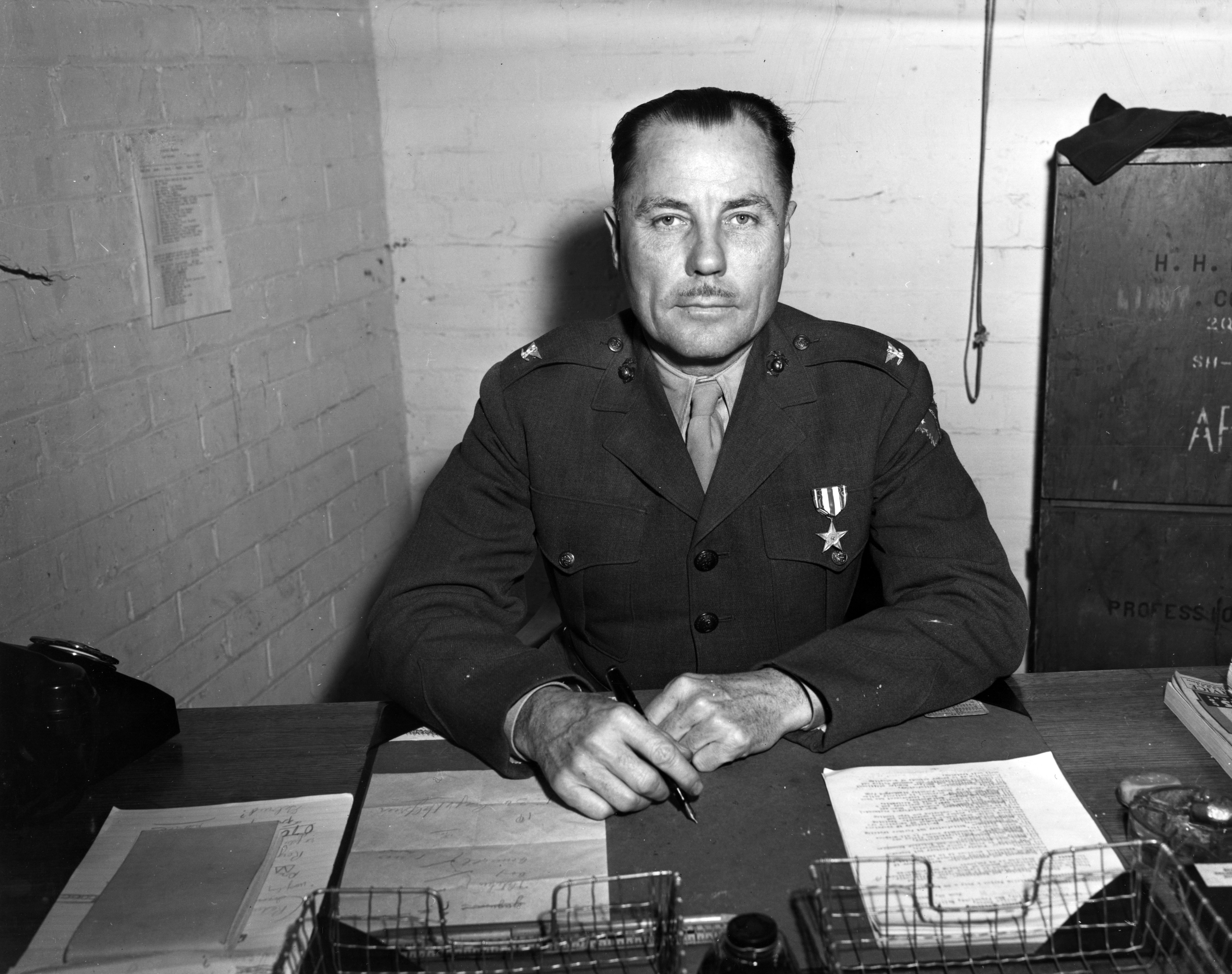
- Brigadier General Herman H. Hanneken, Medal of Honor recipient
- Born: June 23, 1893; St. Louis, Missouri, U.S.
- Died: August 23, 1986 (aged 93); La Jolla, California, U.S.
- Burial place: Fort Rosecrans National Cemetery, San Diego, California
- Military career
- Allegiance: United States
- Branch: United States Marine Corps
- Service years: 1914–1948
- Rank: Brigadier general
- Commands: 7th Marines; 2nd Battalion, 7th Marines
- Conflicts: World War I Banana Wars • Occupation of Haiti • Occupation of Nicaragua; World War II • Battle of Guadalcanal • Operation Cartwheel • Battle of Peleliu
- Awards: Medal of Honor; Navy Cross (2); Silver Star; Legion of Merit; Bronze Star Medal

Herman Henry Hanneken (June 23, 1893 – August 23, 1986) was a United States Marine Corps officer and a recipient of the U.S. military's highest decoration, the Medal of Honor.

Beginning his career as an enlisted man, Hanneken served in the Banana Wars of the 1910s and 1920s. During the United States occupation of Haiti, he assassinated the resistance leader Charlemagne Péralte, for which he was awarded the Medal of Honor. Subsequently, granted a commission, Hanneken served in Haiti for several more months and was awarded a Navy Cross for killing another rebel leader. He received a second Navy Cross for his actions during the occupation of Nicaragua in the late 1920s.

After a decade of stateside duty, he served in the Pacific Theater of World War II. During this conflict, he was awarded the Silver Star, the Legion of Merit, and the Bronze Star. He retired in 1948, after a thirty-four-year career, and was promoted in retirement to brigadier general.

== Early years and career ==
Herman Henry Hanneken was born on June 23, 1893, in St. Louis, Missouri. He attended the Henrick Preparatory School in that city.

He enlisted in the Marine Corps as a private in July 1914, and served the following five years in the enlisted ranks, rising to the rank of sergeant.

== Occupation of Haiti ==
The United States invaded Haiti in 1915 and occupied the country for 19 years. In the years following the initial invasion, rebel forces under Charlemagne Péralte conducted an armed resistance to the occupation. On the night of October 31–November 1, 1919, Hanneken assassinated the resistance leader, Péralte. Hanneken was disguised and was led into the rebels camp in Northern Haiti by Jean-Baptiste Conze, one of Péralte's officers who betrayed the Haitian leader. In the short skirmish that ensued, Hanneken killed Péralte and about 1,200 of his followers were killed, captured, or dispersed. Hanneken subsequently circulated a photograph of Péralte's half-naked body tied to a door. However, the attempt to intimidate backfired and instead evoked sympathy for Péralte. Hanneken was awarded the Medal of Honor for "extraordinary heroism" and "conspicuous gallantry and intrepidity in actual conflict with the enemy" and, in December 1919, commissioned as a second lieutenant.

In another raid just five months after the death of Charlemagne, he shot and killed Osiris Joseph, another Haitian rebel leader who succeeded Charlemagne. He was awarded the Navy Cross for this act.

Upon appointment as a second lieutenant he was assigned to train the Haitian police force, the Gendarmerie. He was ordered to return to the United States in April 1920, and following his arrival at the Marine Barracks, Quantico, Virginia, he was assigned to a special course at the Marine Corps Schools.

== 1920s service and occupation of Nicaragua ==
As a member of the 6th Regiment, First Lieutenant Hanneken sailed for Brazil to participate in the Brazilian Exposition. The unit returned to Quantico in the latter part of 1922, and several months later, he was transferred to the Marine Detachment, USS Antares, where he assumed duties as commanding officer.

In January 1925, he was transferred to the Marine Barracks, Naval Air Station Lakehurst, New Jersey, and in April 1927, was detached to the Marine barracks at the Philadelphia Navy Yard.

Again ordered to foreign shore duty in December 1928, he arrived in Corinto, Nicaragua in January of the following year. Upon his arrival in Nicaragua he was assigned to duty with the 2nd Brigade of Marines. The United States had invaded this Central American country in 1912 and had been occupying it since. A month after his arrival Hanneken captured another leader of the rebel forces resisting the invasion by the United States. He was awarded his second Navy Cross for "bringing in" General José María Jirón Ruano, the Guatemalan Chief of Staff of the Nicaraguan General Augusto César Sandino.

== Service in the 1930s ==
In July 1930, Hanneken returned to Quantico to attend the Company Officers' Course at the Marine Corps Schools. Upon graduation in January of the next year, he was transferred to the Marine Corps Base at San Diego, California, and later to the Naval Base, at San Pedro, California. His next assignment found him at the Marine Barracks, Mare Island, California, in August 1936, where during his tour of duty he was appointed a major.

Major Hanneken was ordered to Quantico in June 1938, and two months later reported for a course of instruction at that base in the Senior Course, Marine Corps Schools.

From June 1939 to December 1940, he was commanding officer, Marine Barracks, Naval Ammunition Depot, Hingham, Massachusetts. He was next ordered to New York to assume command of the Marine detachment aboard the USS Harry Lee with additional duties as Transport Quartermaster.

== World War II and later life ==
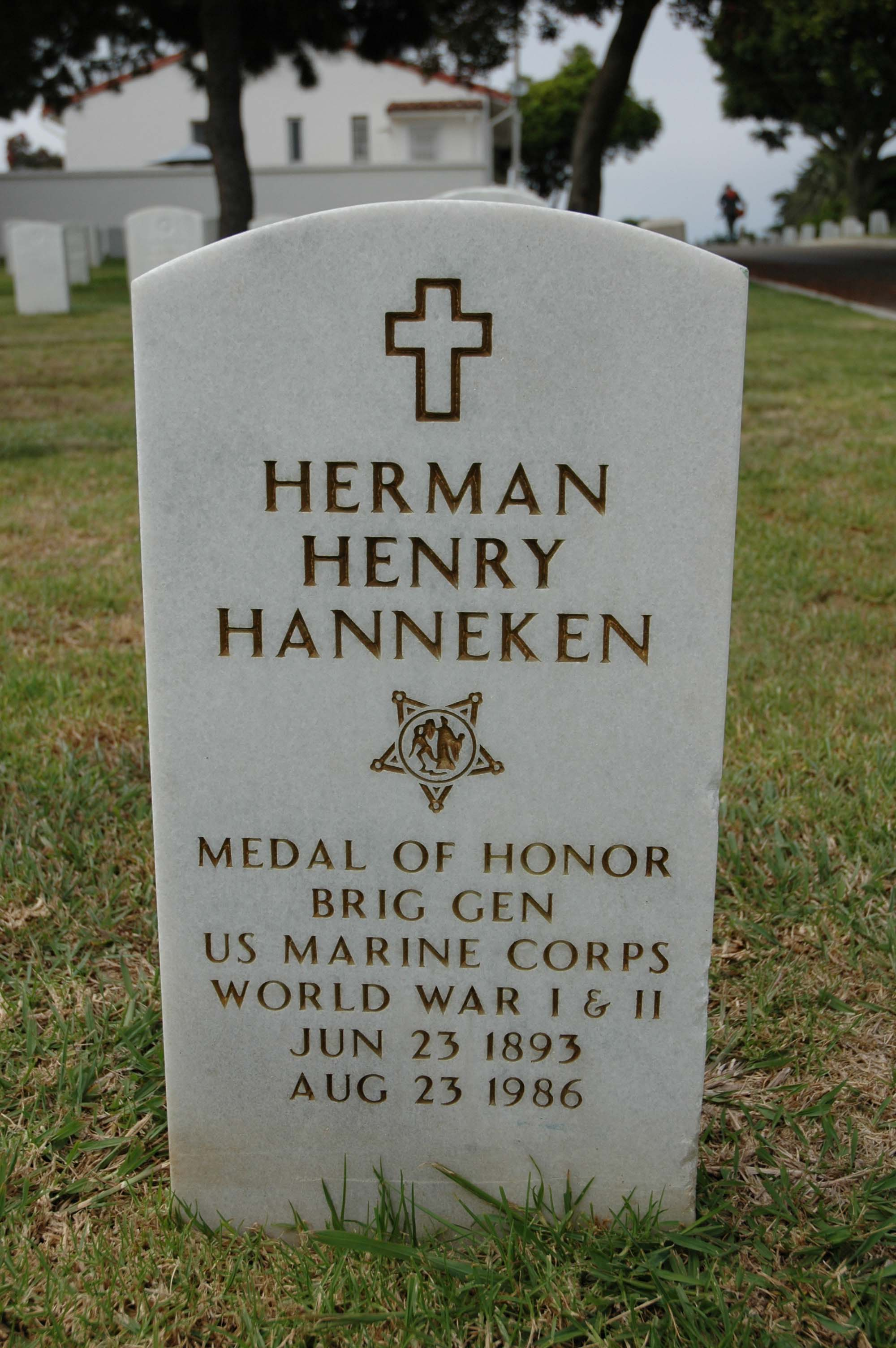
Hanneken's grave at Fort Rosecrans National Cemetery

Hanneken served with the 1st Marine Division from June 1941 until November 1944, when he returned to the United States to command the 2nd Infantry Training Regiment and the Headquarters Battalion, at Camp Pendleton, Oceanside, California.

While with the famed 1st Marine Division his duties were varied. While commander of the 2nd Battalion of 7th Marine Regiment during the Guadalcanal campaign he was awarded the Silver Star for conspicuous gallantry and intrepidity in action against the enemy. Hanneken relieved Colonel Julian N. Frisbie as commanding officer of the 7th Marines and led this regiment during the Peleliu action, where he received the Legion of Merit for meritorious conduct in action, and during the Cape Gloucester operation he was decorated with the Bronze Star.

In September 1945, he was assigned as commanding officer of the Staging Regiment at the Marine Training and Replacement Command, San Diego Area, prior to his transfer to the Troop Training Unit, Amphibious Forces, Pacific Fleet.

It was as Chief of Staff of that organization that he was transferred to the retired list for Marine Corps officers. He retired on July 1, 1948, concluding a 34-year career in the Marine Corps. He was advanced to his final rank of brigadier general upon his retirement for having been specially commended for service in actual combat.

Brigadier General Hanneken died on August 23, 1986, at the Veterans Hospital in LaJolla, California, and was buried with honors four days later at the Fort Rosecrans National Cemetery, San Diego, California. He was 93 years old.

== Military awards ==
Hanneken's military awards:

Medal of Honor		Navy Cross with Gold Star	Silver Star
Legion of Merit	Bronze Star Medal	Navy Presidential Unit Citation with 2 bronze stars	Navy Unit Commendation
Marine Corps Good Conduct Medal	Marine Corps Expeditionary Medal with 2 bronze stars	Mexican Service Medal	Haitian Campaign Medal (1917)
World War I Victory Medal	Nicaraguan Campaign Medal (1933)	American Defense Service Medal	American Campaign Medal
Asiatic-Pacific Campaign Medal with 3 bronze stars	World War II Victory Medal	Haitian Military Medal with 2 gold stars	Nicaraguan Medal of Merit

=== Medal of Honor citation ===
HANNEKEN, Herman Henry
2nd Lieutenant, U.S. Marine Corps
G. O. Navy Department, No. 536
June 10, 1920

Citation:

For extraordinary heroism and conspicuous gallantry and intrepidity in actual conflict with the enemy near GRANDE RIVIERE, Republic of Haiti, on the night of October 31st-November 1st, 1919, resulting in the death of Charlemagne Peralte, the supreme bandit chief in the Republic of Haiti, and the killing and capture and dispersal of about 1,200 of his outlaw followers. Second Lieutenant Hanneken not only distinguished himself by his excellent judgement and leadership, but unhesitatingly exposed himself to great personal danger, and the slightest error would have forfeited not only his life but the lives of the detachments of Gendarmerie under his command. The successful termination of his mission will undoubtedly prove of untold value to the Republic of Haiti.

=== First Navy Cross citation ===
Citation:

The President of the United States of America takes pleasure in presenting the Navy Cross to First Lieutenant Herman Henry Hanneken (MCSN: 0-392), United States Marine Corps, for extraordinary heroism displayed on the night of March 31–1 April 1920, by advancing into the camp of Osiris Joseph, a notorious bandit leader, while serving with the First Provisional Brigade of Marines (Gendarmerie d'Haiti). With admirable disregard of danger, Lieutenant Hanneken, leading a small detail, advanced to within about fifteen feet of Osiris Joseph, who was surrounded by his followers, shot and killed him, thereby ridding the country of a bandit who had long terrorized Northern Haiti. In addition to the courage displayed, the resourcefulness shown, and the careful planning necessary to accomplish his mission are worthy of the highest praise.

=== Second Navy Cross citation ===
Citation:

The President of the United States of America takes pleasure in presenting a Gold Star in lieu of a Second Award of the Navy Cross to First Lieutenant Herman Henry Hanneken (MCSN: 0-392), United States Marine Corps, for extraordinary achievement, zeal untiring and most successful efforts during active service in the Northern Area of the Republic of Nicaragua from 11 December 1928 until 30 June 1929. In command of a combined Marine and Nicaraguan Voluntario combat patrol, First Lieutenant Hanneken had many successful contacts with the bandits during which he distinguished himself by his gallantry. His courage and ability are exceptional and his operations against bandits were of great value in the suppression of banditry in this area.

=== Silver Star citation ===
Citation:

The President of the United States of America takes pleasure in presenting the Silver Star to Lieutenant Colonel Herman Henry Hanneken (MCSN: 0-392), United States Marine Corps, for conspicuous gallantry and intrepidity as Commanding Officer of the Second Battalion, Seventh Marines, FIRST Marine Division during action against enemy Japanese forces on Guadalcanal, Solomon Islands on 2 and 3 November 1942. After Lieutenant Colonel Hanneken had brought his battalion into a position on the beach east of Metapona River, an out-numbering hostile force affected a landing near his flank and succeeded in establishing a beachhead for future operations. Although extremely handicapped by an untenable position, the battalion, in a separate fight against tremendous odds inflicted heavy casualties upon the Japanese landing force until Lieutenant Colonel Hanneken withdrew to a more advantageous position and launched a successful attack. His courageous leadership and cool judgment under fire were in keeping with the highest traditions of the United States Naval Service.

== See also ==
- List of Medal of Honor recipients
